= Kiss Does... Rave =

Compilation album by Various artists
- Released: 30 April 2007
- Genre: Electronica
- Length: 156:11 (CD); 116:50 (USB flash drive)
- Label: Wonderland

Kiss Does... Rave is a compilation album released by the Kiss Network on 30 April 2007. It was released on both a two-CD album and on a 1GB USB flash drive – it was the first album in the UK to be released in USB format, and was sold exclusively through HMV stores and on Kiss and HMV's websites. Steve Parkinson, Kiss's managing director, described releasing the album on USB as "another example of Kiss being ahead of the game, knowing its audience and engaging with them in ways that will inspire and entertain".

The first disc of the CD version of the album comprised 19 rave tracks from the 1990s; the second disc contained 18 new rave songs from the 2000s. The USB version held 26 tracks in 256kpbs WMA format. NME described Kiss Does... Rave as being "the first album to draw the line between original and nu rave".

== Track listings ==
Mix 1
No.	Title	Artist	Length
1.	"Let Me Be Your Fantasy"	Baby D	2:57
2.	"Playing With Knives"	Bizarre Inc.	2:33
3.	"Sound of Eden"	Shades of Rhythm	2:57
4.	"Activ-8"	Altern 8	4:45
5.	"Go"	Moby	3:24
6.	"LFO"	LFO	4:23
7.	"Take Me Away (Pinned Up mix)"	True Faith featuring Bridget Grace	6:37
8.	"Far Out"	Sonz of a Loop da Loop Era	4:34
9.	"Keep the Fire Burning"	The House Crew	2:57
10.	"The Bouncer"	Kicks Like a Mule	5:22
11.	"£20 to Get In"	Shut Up and Dance	2:04
12.	"We Are I.E."	Lennie De Ice	4:10
13.	"Bombscare"	2 Bad Mice	4:20
14.	"On a Ragga Tip 2007"	SL2	4:59
15.	"Compnded"	Edge 1	4:18
16.	"Lock Up"	Zero B	3:57
17.	"DJ's Unite, Vol 1"	DJ's Unite	3:33
18.	"This Sound Is for the Underground"	Krome & Time	5:06
19.	"Out of Space"	The Prodigy	5:19
Total length:			78:15

Mix 2
No.	Title	Artist	Length
1.	"Bouncer"	Klaxons	2:12
2.	"Gravity's Rainbow"	Kicks Like a Mule	3:00
3.	"Standing in the Way of Control (Soulwax Nite version)"	Gossip	5:22
4.	"Thou Shalt Always Kill (Knifehand Chop mix)"	dan le sac vs Scroobius Pip	3:38
5.	"Banquet (Boys Noize mix)"	Bloc Party	6:09
6.	"No More Eating (Hadouken remix)"	Plan B	3:48
7.	"The Bomb (Phones Collateral Damage mix)"	New Young Pony Club	4:52
8.	"Shoot the Runner (Shakes remix)"	Kasabian	5:16
9.	"The Beat"	Simian Mobile Disco	3:18
10.	"Pop the Glock"	Uffie	3:28
11.	"Paris Four Hundred (Etienne De Crecy mix)"	Mylo	3:50
12.	"Tony the Beat (Rex the Dog mix)"	The Sounds	3:15
13.	"You're Gonna Want Me"	Tiga	4:32
14.	"Plastic Dreams (Switch remix)"	Jaydee	4:51
15.	"Podium (Max Graham mix)"	Trisco	6:00
16.	"Work on You (original)"	MSTRKRFT	6:00
17.	"Jealous Girls (New Young Pony club mix)"	Gossip	3:38
18.	"Your Love"	Friendly Fires	4:47
Total length:			77:56

USB flash drive
No.	Title	Artist	Length
1.	"Activ-8"	Altern 8	4:45
2.	"Go"	Moby	3:24
3.	"LFO"	LFO	4:23
4.	"Take Me Away (Pinned Up mix)"	True Faith featuring Bridget Grace	6:37
5.	"Far Out"	Sonz of a Loop da Loop Era	4:34
6.	"Bouncer"	Kicks Like a Mule	5:22
7.	"£20 to Get In"	Shut Up and Dance	2:04
8.	"We Are I.E."	Lennie De Ice	4:10
9.	"Bombscare"	2 Bad Mice	4:20
10.	"On a Ragga Tip 2007"	SL2	4:59
11.	"Compnded"	Edge 1	4:18
12.	"DJ's Unite, Vol 1"	DJ's Unite	3:33
13.	"This Sound Is for the Underground"	Krome & Time	5:06
14.	"Gravity's Rainbow"	Kicks Like a Mule	3:00
15.	"Standing in the Way of Control (Soulwax Nite version)"	Gossip	5:22
16.	"Thou Shalt Always Kill (Knifehand Chop mix)"	dan le sac vs Scroobius Pip	3:38
17.	"Banquet (Boys Noize mix)"	Bloc Party	6:09
18.	"The Bomb (Phones Collateral Damage mix)"	New Young Pony Club	4:52
19.	"The Beat"	Simian Mobile Disco	3:18
20.	"Pop the Glock"	Uffie	3:28
21.	"You're Gonna Want Me"	Tiga	4:32
22.	"Plastic Dreams (Switch remix)"	Jaydee	4:51
23.	"Podium (Max Graham mix)"	Trisco	6:00
24.	"Work on You (original)"	MSTRKRFT	6:00
25.	"Jealous Girls (New Young Pony club mix)"	Gossip	3:38
26.	"Your Love"	Friendly Fires	4:47
Total length:			116:50
