= XL Recordings Chapters =

XL Recordings Chapters is a musical compilation series which showcased tracks from the XL Recordings record label. Also, other notable breakbeat hardcore, house and techno tracks, XL's output at the time, were featured from other labels.

XL released these compilations (5 chapters plus 2 others) between 1990 and 1995. The label released, "Chapter VI" in November 2015 showcasing the latest crop of artists with XL Recordings.

XL acts on the chapters series included :

- Empirion
- Jonny L
- Liquid
- Nu-Matic
- The Prodigy
- SL2

Other non-XL acts included :

- Brooklyn Funk Essentials
- The House Crew
- Kicks Like a Mule
- Praga Khan
- Project One
- Shut Up and Dance
- Underworld
- Winx

== The Chapters ==
- The First Chapter – 1990
  - 1. Flowmasters – Let It Take Control
  - 2. 2 In Rhythm – We Want Funk
  - 3. Brooklyn Funk Essentials – We Got To Come Together
  - 4. Looney Tunes – Just As Long As I Got You –
  - 5. Centrefield Assignment – Mi Casa
  - 6. Ellis D – I Will Survive
  - 7. Subliminal Aura – Ease The Pressure
  - 8. Moody Boyz – Jammin'
  - 9. Hardcore – I Like John
  - 10. Space Opera – Space 3001
  - 11. Fantasy UFO – Fantasy
  - 12. Liaison D – He Chilled Out
  - 13. Looney Tunes – Inject The Beat
  - 14. Freedom Authority – Expressions

- The Second Chapter – Hardcore European Dance Music – 1991
  - 1. T99 – Anasthasia (The Scientist remix)
  - 2. Channel X – Rave The Rhythm
  - 3. Holy Noise – The Noise
  - 4. John and Julie – Circles (G.T.O's Europa mix)
  - 5. Set Up System – Fairy Dust
  - 6. External Group – Gravity
  - 7. Cubic 22 – Night In Motion
  - 8. Digital Boy – Gimme A Fat Beat (Frank de Wulf remix)
  - 9. Frequency – Where Is Your Evidence
  - 10.The Prodigy – Charly
  - 11. Incubus – The Spirit
  - 12.Praga Khan – Rave Alarm

- The Third Chapter – Breakbeat House – 1992
  - 1. Liquid – Sweet Harmony
  - 2. Shut Up And Dance – The Green Man (Rum and Black Mix)
  - 3. Tronik House – Uptempo (Reese Mix)
  - 4. SL2 – On a Ragga Tip
  - 5. Project One – Smokin
  - 6. The House Crew – Keep The Fires Burning
  - 7. The Prodigy – Everybody In The Place (Fairground Mix)
  - 8. Nu-Matic – Hard Times
  - 9. First Project – Right Before
  - 10. Kicks Like a Mule – "The Bouncer" (Housequake Mix)
  - 11. SL2 – DJs Take Control (DJ Seduction Remix)
  - 12. Mark One – Hoovers and Spraycans

- 4th Chapter – 1993
  - 1. Underworld – Rez
  - 2. Illuminate (XVX.1) – Tremona Del Terra
  - 3. Jonny L – Ooh Like It (Original Sin Edit)
  - 4. Liquid – Free
  - 5. Me And Jack – Viva House
  - 6. Delta Lady – Anything You Want
  - 7. The Prodigy – One Love (Original Mix)
  - 8. Sourmash – Pilgrimage To Paradise
  - 9. Jonny L – Transonic
  - 10. The Prodigy – Weather Experience
  - 11. Wiggle – Africa
  - 12. Dome Patrol – The Cutting Edge

- 5th Chapter – The Heavyweight Selection – 1995
  - 1 Liquid – Niagara
  - 2 Winx – Don't Laugh (Josh Wink Raw Mix)
  - 3 Tall Paul – Rok Da House
  - 4 Subliminal Cuts – Le Voie Le Soleil (Way Out West Summer Of Love Remix)
  - 5 Head-On – I Want Your Love (JX Mix)
  - 6 Yum Yum – 3 Minute Warning (Scope Mix)
  - 7 Movin' Melodies – La Luna (To The Beat Of The Drum)
  - 8 Pleasant Chemistry – (Let's Have Some) Sax (Sax Or Snares Mix)
  - 9 The Prodigy – The Speedway (Theme From Fastlane) (Secret Knowledge Trouser Rouser)
  - 10 Empirion – Narcotic Influence

- Remix Chapter – Hardcore European Music – 1992 (Japan AVEX Trax)
  - 1. T99 – Anasthasia (The Scientist remix)
  - 2. The Prodigy – Charly
  - 3. SL2 – On A Ragga Tip
  - 4. Praga Khan – Rave Alarm
  - 5. Cubic 22 – Night In Motion
  - 6. SL2 – DJ'S Take Control
  - 7. The Prodigy – Fire (Sunrise Version)
  - 8. Liquid – Sweet Harmony
  - 9. Nu Matic – Spring In My Step
  - 10. Liquid – Liquid Is Liquid
  - 11. DJ's Unite – DJ's Unite
  - 12. The Prodigy – Everybody In The Place

- The American Chapter 1993
  - 1. Looney Tunes – Just as Long as I Got You – Looney Tunes
  - 2. Flowmasters – Let It Take Control
  - 3. John and Julie – Circles
  - 4. Awesome 3 – Don't Go
  - 5. Liquid – Sweet Harmony
  - 6. The Prodigy – Charly
  - 7. Cubic 22 – Night in Motion
  - 8. T99 – Anasthasia
  - 9. Dub War – Dance Conspiracy
  - 10. Dome Patrol – Cutting Edge
  - 11. SL2 – On a Ragga Tip
  - 12. Jonny L – Ooh, I Like It

- Chapter VI 2015
  - 1. Special Request – Amnesia
  - 2. Novelist x Mumdance – 1 Sec
  - 3. rLr – I Am Paint (Centre Of The Earth Dub)
  - 4. Zomby – Slime
  - 5. GILA – Handz On A Hardbody
  - 6. MssingNo – Inta
  - 7. KAYTRANADA – 195
  - 8. Homepark – Forever Walking
  - 9. Hugo Massien – All Night
  - 10. Powell – Insomniac
