= Rave 92 =

Compilation album by various artists
- Released: 16 November 1992
- Recorded: 1990–92
- Genres: Breakbeat hardcore; electronic dance music
- Length: 79:46
- Label: Cookie Jar Records
- Compiler: Mark Arthurworrey

Cookie Jar Records Rave chronology
The Rave Gener8tor II (1992)	Rave 92 (1992)

Rave 92 is a DJ mixed compilation album compiled by Mark Arthurworrey and released on Cookie Jar Records, containing popular rave singles that had become popular in the United Kingdom in 1992. The compilation, the fifth and final rave compilation compiled by Arthurworrey and released on the label, aims to collect some of the year's biggest rave hits, although, as has been pointed out, Rave 92 also intends to "bridge across the gap between chart rave and the more obscure hardcore tracks." Released in November 1992, Rave 92 was well-received and a commercial success, reaching number 3 on the UK Compilation Chart. Several latter-day electronic producers, including Phaeleh, have cited hearing Rave 92 for the first time as the point they became interested in electronic music.

== Background ==
By late 1992, just as raves in the United Kingdom were becoming increasingly notorious, numerous rave music singles had seen crossover success, transcending from their underground rave status into becoming chart hits. Free parties had also gained ground in 1992. Many of rave's most successful singles were in the breakbeat hardcore genre, a genre that combines breakbeats, four-on-the-floor rhythms, a fast tempo alongside other features such as piano and "hoover" sounds. As the sound gained popularity commercially, numerous compilation albums were released to document the scene's most commercially successful records, including Telstar's Rave Alert (1992) and Virgin Records' The Ultimate Rave (1992) and The Mega Rave (1993). Rave 92 was issued by Polygram's subsidiser label Cookie Jar Records Ltd. in attempt to document, as the title proclaims, the most "massive rave hits of the year."

Rave 92 was compiled by Mark Arthurworrey, who had worked throughout the 1980s and 1990s as a writer, remixer and compilation compiler. He had compiled rave compilations before for other independent labels, including Smash Hits Rave! (Dover Records, 1990) and Just Seventeen Get Kicking (Dover Records/Chrysalis, 1990). His first rave compilation for Cookie Jar Records was Hardcore Uproar, released in 1991 in association Dino Entertainment. In 1991−92, Arthurworrey compiled a series of rave compilations for Cookie Jar Records, including Steamin! Hardcore 92 (1991), Technostate (1992), The Rave Gener8tor (1992), and The Rave Gener8tor II (1992). Rave 92 was intended to "round up" the year for this series of compilations, although Arthurworrey would continue to compile dance compilations for the label until the release of Ragga Groove in 1994.

== Content ==
"Rave '92 doubles up tracks by the Orb, the Prodigy and 2 Unlimited – sound investment choices all – but do Messiah put forward a convincing album-purchase argument? Perhaps if 20,000 Hardcore Members had been included as well… The non-repetition rule is there for a reason, but if the tracks are good enough it doesn't matter. 'Temple of Dreams' is a great side opener that more than deserves a place here."

— Kat Stevens on Rave 92's usage of artist repetition.

Rave 92 aims to collect "massive rave hits" of 1992, and features slight transitions between songs in the style of a DJ mix; the CD edition features 24 tracks, whereas the LP and cassette versions features 32 tracks and is a double album. According to Kat Stevens of Freaky Trigger, Rave 92 intends to "bridge across the gap between chart rave and the more obscure hardcore tracks."

The compilation makes use of artist repetition, as the Prodigy, techno act Messiah and Eurodance act 2 Unlimited all appear twice on the album. One critic wrote that Rave 92 disregards "one of the cardinal rules of mixtapes: 'thou shalt never have more than one track by the same artist.' Can doubling up on compilations ever be justified?" The critic answered the question: "If you're new to an artist, having more than one track to go on obviously gives you a greater confidence in the artist's quality (or lack of), and maybe even grounds for spending your pocket money on the album and the unknown bounty that lies within it."

=== Songs ===
The compilation opens with "Fire" by the Prodigy, who became the most commercially successful act on the album by some distance. Kat Stevens of FreakyTrigger said that: "The opening song of any compilation is vital to its success and coherence. It must draw in the casual listener that might not otherwise consider investing the mix (perhaps opting for one containing 'Sesame's Treet' instead), but also give an honest representation of the rest of the tracks to avoid resentment (and the inevitable trip to Music & Video Exchange). 'Fire' is an excellent overture: nonsensical samples, euphoric hands-in-the-air breakdowns, infectious drum beats, a strong ragga influence and plenty of oblique drugs references. [...] But it also outlines Rave '92's intent to bridge across the gap between chart rave and the more obscure hardcore tracks." She said it was "a fine choice of artist to cut and paste into full-on rave euphoria madness, and a fine flagship to start the compilation."

Although not strictly a rave song, House of Pain's "Jump Around" follows; one journalist wrote that its appearance on the album was "to sell units" but also felt that the song is perhaps "symbolic of the rave end-times," noting "[a] drop in quality of happy drugs in the nineties saw ravers increasingly turning to coke, booze and speed for their kicks, all of which increased the general air of aggression and paranoia." The fifth song, Messiah's cover of "I Feel Love" marks a changing point in the album in that it is a "hardcore proper" song, unlike the first four songs which, according to Kat Stevens, "could reasonably be labelled as 'pop'." It is sequenced after Bizarre Inc's "I'm Gonna Get You", and the mixing between the two songs is logical, given the similarity between the "string-heavy-warbling" that closes "I'm Gonna Get You" and the opening bars of "I Feel Love".

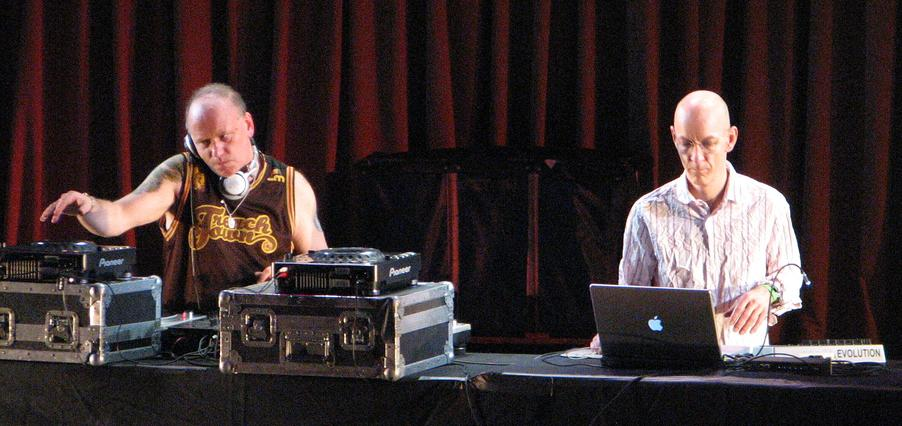
The Orb feature on Rave 92 with "Assassin" and "Blue Room".

After the techno-dominated sixth track, "Something Good" by Utah Saints, another notable segue occurs with Mello Core's "Good Feeling", which, by contrast, is an atmospheric track defined by ethereal strings, conspicuous hi-hats and a soothing female voice singing of "the pleasurable effects of substance abuse." Tracks 16 and 17 on the CD, Kicks Like a Mule's "The Bouncer" and Ratpack's "Searchin' for My Rizla", are both "grounded in everyday settings – mild frustration over misplacing small items, feeling a bit dizzy, epic clubbing fail, slumping in front of kids’ telly when you get home at 5am." The following song, 2 Unlimited's "Twilight Zone" heralds a change in tone with its introduction "awooga" warning sirens.

The CD's 22nd track, Blue Pearl's "(Can You) Feel the Passion", is the first point on Rave 92 since Bizarre Inc's "I'm Gonna Get You" to feature a "shameless", poppy, hooky diva house chorus, featuring a techno beat overlaid with harsh industrial riffs. The song is also said to counterpoint the earlier inclusion of Rage's "Run to You"; according to Stevens, "If Rage's 'Run to You' was filled with tame but uncomfortable references to knobbing within a loving relationship, then Blue Pearl's contribution to Rave ’92 is a steaming pile of mortification."

== Release and legacy ==
Rave 92 was released by Cookie Jar Records on 16 November 1992; it was the label's fifth rave compilation and fifth charting release overall, as well as the last of 1992. It was a commercial success, reaching number 3 on the UK Compilation Chart on the week ending 29 November, and stayed on the chart for 11 weeks. It remains the best-selling compilation that Cookie Jar Records released. The artwork for the album was provided by design agency Offbeat Design.

Rave 92 has gone on to be credited by several producers as marking the point they became interested in electronic music; in a 2012 interview with Resident Advisor, "genre-spanning" UK production duo Dusky credited the album as an influence; Nick Harriman of the duo said "it's a really commercial compilation but that was how I initially got into dance music. I used to get my pocket money and go up to Our Price once a month and buy tapes." Speaking of The Orb's songs "Assassin" and "Blue Room," he said "they have this crazy psychedelic percussion that's so textural. I used to really like the psychedelic stuff a lot more, I used to go to these raves at the Drome called Mindscapes and they used to play a lot of stuff in a similar vein to The Orb." Todd L. Burns of Resident Advisor, unfamiliar with the compilation, said it "seems like a pretty mass market type of thing." Nick told another publication: "One of my earliest memories of electronic music is when I was eight. At the time, I had a tape called Rave 92, it had loads of big commercial dance tracks from the time but also included The Orb's 'Blue Room', which had a massive effect on me. It really drew me in and inspired me to learn more about electronic music."

Other artists who cited Rave 92 as marking a shift in their taste in music include drum and bass producer Kit, citing it alongside the Prodigy's Experience, Rebuild Music founder and UK hardcore producer DJ Thumpa, Viper Recordings artist Insideinfo, Correspondent artist Man Power, promoter and disc jockey Jonna, who was introduced to the Prodigy by the album, and electronic producer Phaeleh, who said that Rave 92 and Nirvana's Nevermind were "the first two albums [he] genuinely got excited by."

in 2007, Kat Stevens of Freaky Trigger said that Rave 92 is her "favourite compilation ever", having grown up on a cassette copy of the album, and from 2007 to 2009 she wrote a long review of the album for the website where she reviewed each track as an individual article. She said "this album has played such an important part in my life, and is as good a representation of my post-adolescent personality as any: loud, silly, obnoxious, embarrassing and talking too quickly, but every so often getting all wide-eyed and marvelling at how awesome the world is like a big old hippy." Drowned in Sound reviewer Andy Thomas cited Rave 92 as a comparison point for Stanton Warriors' 2001 mix album The Stanton Sessions, which he described as containing "some heady Rave 92 kickbacks."

== Track listing ==
1. The Prodigy – "Fire" – 3:22
2. House of Pain – "Jump Around" – 3:38
3. The Shamen – "Ebeneezer Goode" – 3:40
4. Bizarre Inc – "I'm Gonna Get You" – 3:04
5. Messiah feat. Precious Wilson – "I Feel Love" – 3:55
6. Utah Saints – "Something Good" – 3:24
7. Mello Core – "Good Feeling" – 3:04
8. 2 Unlimited – "The Magic Friend" – 2:59
9. The Orb – "Assassin" (Radio 7 - Edit) – 3:24
10. Rage – "Run to You" – 3:15
11. SL2 – "On a Ragga Tip" – 3:34
12. Liquid – "Sweet Harmony" – 3:26
13. Urban Hype – "A Trip to Trumpton" – 3:31
14. Messiah – "Temple of Dreams" – 2:41
15. The Prodigy – "Everybody in the Place" – 3:37
16. Kicks Like a Mule – "The Bouncer" – 3:11
17. Ratpack – "Searchin' for My Rizla" – 2:49
18. 2 Unlimited – "Twilight Zone" – 3:12
19. Shut Up & Dance– "Ravin' I'm Ravin'" – 3:23
20. Praga Khan – Injected with a Poison" – 3:46
21. Opus III – "It's a Fine Day" – 3:14
22. Blue Pearl – "(Can You) Feel the Passion" – 3:11
23. Ambassadors of Funk feat. M.C. Mario – "Supermarioland" – 3:07
24. The Orb – "Blue Room" (Radio 7 - Edit) – 3:29

== Personnel ==
- Offbeat Design – artwork
- Mark Arthurworrey – compiling

== Charts ==
Chart (1992)	Peak position
UK Compilation Chart	3
