= 2024 in British music =

This is a summary of the year 2024 in British music.

== Events ==
=== January ===
- 1 January – BBC One sees in the New Year with the concert Rick Astley Rocks New Year's Eve. Rick Astley is joined by various guests, including Rylan Clark with whom he performs a rendition of the Dead of Alive track "You Spin Me Round (Like a Record)".
- 3 January – Data from the British Phonographic Industry shows that female artists enjoyed a record year in the UK Singles Chart, with female artists or groups topping the charts for 31 of 52 weeks, the most since the charts began in 1952.
- 5 January – Indie rock band The Last Dinner Party are named the BBC Sound of 2024.
- 6 January – Music researcher Colin Jagger launches an appeal to find the whereabouts of the original score of Gilbert and Sullivan's Utopia Limited, which was sold in 1915 and is believed to be lost.
- 7 January – At the 75th Creative Arts Emmy Awards in Los Angeles, Foy Vance and Ed Sheeran win the Primetime Emmy Award for Outstanding Original Music and Lyrics for "A Beautiful Game", written for the final episode of the TV series Ted Lasso.
- 8 January – Roger Daltrey announces he will step down as curator of the annual Teenage Cancer Trust gigs held at the Royal Albert Hall following the 2024 events.
- 10 January – Stevie Spring is appointed Chair of the PRS for Music Board, succeeding Stephen Davidson, who will relinquish the role officially at the organisations' AGM.
- 11 January – Royal Mail issues a set of 15 stamps featuring the Spice Girls to celebrate their 30th anniversary, the first time a set of UK stamps have been dedicated to a female pop group.
- 22 January – Birmingham Royal Ballet announces simultaneously the departure of Koen Kessels as its music director on 30 June 2024, and the appointment of Paul Murphy as its next music director, effective 1 July 2024.
- 24 January
  - Research published by the Music Venues Trust highlights the number of live music venues closing due to financial pressure, with 125 abandoning live music in 2023, half of those closing completely.
  - Raye is nominated for seven Brit Awards, setting a new record for the most nominations received by a single artist.
- 29 January
  - Nicki Minaj, 21 Savage, J Hus and Doja Cat are confirmed as headline acts for the 2024 Wireless Festival, scheduled to take place from 12–14 July.
  - Equity announces an interim agreement with English National Opera that forestalls previously declared intentions of industrial action.
- 30 January – A report published by the House of Commons Women and Equalities Committee highlights misogyny in the music industry.
- 31 January
  - The rock band Nothing but Thieves play an exclusive gig for Radio X listeners at London's O2 Forum Kentish Town.
  - Adele announces plans to hold a series of concerts at a specially built stadium in Munich in August, something she describes as "a bit random, but still fabulous!".

=== February ===
- 3 February – Seventeen grassroots music venues across Wales experiencing financial difficulties are offered £718,000 in Welsh Government funding to help keep them open.
- 8 February – Kings Place announces the appointment of Sam McShane as its next artistic director, effective 20 May 2024.
- 11 February – Oasis are nominated for the Rock & Roll Hall of Fame alongside other artists including Sinéad O'Connor, Cher and Mariah Carey.
- 15 February – The BBC reverses its plan to axe its in-house BBC Singers choir, with a new partnership between the ensemble and the Voces8 Foundation for future sustainability of the ensemble.
- 16 February – Orchestra members, chorus members, and music staff of English National Opera (ENO) call off their previously intended industrial action for February, after agreement in principle by ENO management to revise their original plans for redundancy and re-engagement of the musicians.
- 22 February – The London Philharmonic Choir announces that Neville Creed is to retire as its artistic director at the close of the 2024–2025 season, and subsequently to take the title of chorus director emeritus.
- 23 February – Rapper Wiley, whose real name is Richard Cowie, is stripped of his MBE after sharing abusive and antisemitic social media posts.
- 26 February – The Royal Mint unveils a collectable coin featuring George Michael.
- 29 February – Manchester's Co-op Live arena, due to open in April, is chosen as the venue for the 2024 MTV Europe Music Awards on 10 November.

=== March ===
- 1 March
  - Swing Fever, an album of big band standards recorded by Jools Holland and Rod Stewart, reaches number one in the UK album chart, giving Holland his first number one album.
  - Release of "Dizzy", Olly Alexander's UK entry for the 2024 Eurovision Song Contest.
  - The annual Cân i Gymru (Song for Wales) contest is held in Swansea, and is won by Sara Davies with the song "Ti".
- 2 March – The 2024 Brit Awards are take place at London's O2 Arena. Raye is the biggest winner of the night, winning six of the seven awards she was nominated for, and beating previous records set by Blue, Adele and Harry Styles at a single awards ceremony.
- 4 March
  - The BBC Concert Orchestra announces the appointment of Matthew Swann as its next Director, effective 27 March 2024.
  - The Home Office grants visas to the Afghan Youth Orchestra, after public protest at the Home Office's prior refusal of their visa applications just before the start of their scheduled UK tour.
- 5 March
  - The Royal Philharmonic Orchestra announces the appointment of Sarah Bardwell as its next managing director.
  - Naxos Music Group and Klaus Heymann announce their acquisition of Chandos Records.
  - The Royal Philharmonic Society announces the recipients of its 2024 RPS Awards:
    - Chamber-Scale Composition: Laurence Osborn – TOMB!
    - Conductor: François-Xavier Roth
    - Ensemble: BBC Singers
    - Gamechanger: Sara Lee and the Irene Taylor Trust
    - Impact: Call of the Mountains – Clare Johnston and Drake Music Scotland
    - Inspiration: Derwent Brass
    - Instrumentalist: Jasdeep Singh Degun – sitar
    - Large-Scale Composition: Kaija Saariaho – Innocence
    - Opera and Music Theatre: Chornobyldorf – Huddersfield Contemporary Music Festival
    - Series and Events: Manchester Classical
    - Singer: Nicky Spence
    - Storytelling: Quartet – Leah Broad
    - Young Artist: Lotte Betts-Dean
- 6 March – The National Opera Studio announces the appointment of Eric Melear as its next artistic director, effective July 2024.
- 7 March – Blur drummer Dave Rowntree is selected as the Labour Party candidate for Mid Sussex.
- 10 March – The UK Country Airplay chart, the first ever genre-specific radio chart in the United Kingdom, debuts its inaugural list, with "Creek Will Rise" by Conner Smith claiming the title of first number one single.
- 14 March – Dua Lipa, Coldplay, SZA and Shania Twain are confirmed as headline acts at Glastonbury 2024.
- 18 March – The Bournemouth Symphony Orchestra announces the appointment of Mark Wigglesworth as its next chief conductor, effective with the 2024–2025 season, with an initial contract of four years.
- 19 March
  - Acts are announced for BBC Radio 1's Big Weekend, including Raye, Rag'n'Bone Man, Charli XCX and Aitch.
  - St John's College, Cambridge, announces that it is discontinuing the St John's Voices, a mixed choir created in 2013 to give sopranos an opportunity to sing in the college chapel.

=== April ===
- 5 April – Britten Pears Arts announces the appointment of Andrew Comben as its next chief executive officer, effective September 2024.
- 12 April –
  - Oasis re-release their debut single "Supersonic" to coincide with its 30th anniversary. The single included a live recording of the song made at Limelight in Belfast in September 1994.
  - James McCartney and Sean Ono Lennon release their single "Primrose Hill".
- 15 April – The Three Choirs Festival announces that Alexis Paterson is to stand down as its chief executive after the 2024 season.
- 16 April – The Welsh National Opera announces it is cutting back on performances because of cuts in funding from the Arts Council of Wales and the Arts Council of England.
- 18 April – Coach resale tickets for Glastonbury 2024 go on sale, and sell out in 18 minutes.
- 19 April – The Brixton Academy reopens for the first time since its licence was suspended after a crowd crush in which two people died in December 2022.
- 20 April –
  - Co-op Live, the UK's largest indoor arena seating 23,500 and costing £365m to build, opens in Manchester. The venue is forced to apologise, however, after cancelling some tickets to a test gig with Rick Astley and offers ticketholders affected tickets to another concert. A series of problems mean the venue's official opening is postponed until 1 May.
  - All five members of the Spice Girls reunite to celebrate member Victoria Beckham's 50th birthday.
- 21 April – The final wave of resale tickets for Glastonbury 2024 sell out within 22 minutes of their release.
- 23 April – The inaugural Northern Music Awards are held in Manchester.
- 25 April – Details of the 2024 BBC Proms are announced, with concerts including disco and appearances by Florence and the Machine and Sam Smith.
- 26 April – Taylor Swift's album The Tortured Poets Department tops the UK Album Chart, and achieves the highest first-week sales in seven years, with sales of 270,000 units.
- 30 April
  - The Royal Opera House, Covent Garden formally announces a name change for the company to the Royal Ballet and Opera.
  - 19-year-old music student Patrick Bennett is reported to have becomes the UK's youngest composer after composing music for the second series of BBC One police drama Granite Harbour.

=== May ===
- 1 May – Manchester's Co-op Live venue postpones its opening for a third time. A Boogie Wit Da Hoodie, the artist scheduled to perform, switches his concert to 4 May at the rival Manchester Arena.
- 2 May – Take That and Keane are among bands and artists to move gigs from the troubled Co-op Live arena amid ongoing technical issues at the venue.
- 3 May – The Royal Philharmonic Society announces the appointment of Angela Dixon as its new chair, effective 22 May 2024.
- 9 May
  - The BBC announces the artists for the BBC Radio 3 New Generation Artists scheme during the period of 2024–2026:
    - Julius Asal (piano)
    - Hana Chang (violin)
    - Sterling Elliott (cello)
    - Elizaveta Ivanova (flute)
    - Kleio Quartet (string quartet)
    - Santiago Sánchez (tenor)
    - Emma Rawicz (jazz saxophone)
  - Spotify says music by UK artists generated £750m in royalties on its platform during 2023.
- 10 May – The Co-op Live arena says it is ready to open after completing safety checks, with Elbow scheduled to perform as the opening act on 14 May.
- 11 May – Olly Alexander represents the UK at the 2024 Eurovision Song Contest with his song "Dizzy", coming 18th out of 25.
- 14 May – Manchester's Co-op Live venue finally opens after being beset by problems that delayed its launch.
- 17 May –
  - Sir Paul McCartney has become the first billionaire British musician according to the 2024 Sunday Times Rich List.
  - Girls Aloud embark on their concert tour The Girls Aloud Show, which the group called "a celebration of their music", as well as a tribute to deceased member Sarah Harding, who died from breast cancer in 2021.
- 21 May
  - English National Opera announces the appointment of Jenny Mollica as its next chief executive officer (CEO), with immediate effect.
  - Glastonbury Festival reveals two new music venues, the Wishing Well and Scissors, which will make their debut at the 2024 Glastonbury Festival.
- 22 May – Organisers of the Challenge Festival, scheduled to take place at Bingley on 25 and 26 May, cancel the event, citing "unrealistic demands" being made on them.
- 24 May – The three-day BBC Radio 1's Big Weekend music festival gets underway in Luton, Bedfordshire, headlined by Chase & Status, Coldplay, Vampire Weekend, and Raye.
- 29 May – English Touring Opera announces that it is to relocate its headquarters to Sheffield, with the process commencing in the autumn of 2024.

=== June ===
- 2 June – The two-day Mighty Hoopla music festival gets underway in Brockwell Park, south east London, headlined by Jessie Ware, En Vogue and Nelly Furtado.
- 6 June – It is announced that the Birmingham Royal Ballet will perform on the Pyramid Stage at the 2024 Glastonbury Festival on 30 June.
- 11 June –
  - The alternative indie pop group Easy Life changes its name to Hard Life following a legal threat from the owners of EasyJet.
  - A 1974 Gibson Les Paul Custom guitar heard in Kate Bush's 1978 song "Wuthering Heights" sells at auction for £21,500.
- 14 June – Among those from the world of music to be recognised in the 2024 Birthday Honours are composer John Rutter and administrator Roger Wright (CBE), as well as singer Liz Mitchell and Duran Duran's Simon Le Bon, who both become MBEs.
- 26 June – The BBC announces presenter changes at Radio 3 effective April 2025, including:
  - The scheduled retirement of Sean Rafferty from In Tune
  - The naming of Petroc Trelawny as the new co-presenter of In Tune in place of Rafferty
  - The naming of Tom McKinney as the new presenter of the weekday Breakfast programme.
- 28 June – Dua Lipa plays the Pyramid Stage on the Friday night of Glastonbury 2024.
- 29 June –
  - Cyndi Lauper returns to Glastonbury, but her set is beset with sound problems that leaves the audience unable to hear her properly.
  - Coldplay make their record fifth Glastonbury appearance, as the Saturday night headline act. The set includes a surprise guest appearance by the actor Michael J. Fox.
- 30 June – SZA appears as the Sunday night headline act at Glastonbury, but the performance is troubled by poor sound quality and audience appeal.

=== July ===
- 11 July
  - Virgin Radio UK is named as the official radio station for CarFest, Latitude Festival and Hardwick Festival.
  - Welsh National Opera announces the appointments of Adele Thomas and Sarah Crabtree as joint holders of the posts of general director and chief executive officer, effective January 2025.
  - Scottish Ensemble announces that Jenny Jamison is to stand down as its chief executive.
- 16 July – The BBC announces the appointment of Jonathan Manners as director of the BBC Singers.
- 23 July – The Northern Chamber Orchestra announces the appointments of Zöe Beyers as its next music director and of Sarah Brandwood-Spencer as its new associate director.

=== August ===
- 9 August – A small number of people are injured following a crowd surge at the Boardmasters Festival in Newquay.
- 15 August – Ed Sheeran joins Taylor Swift on stage in London as a surprise guest as she begins the final part of the European leg of her Eras Tour.
- 24 August – HRH King Charles III announces the appointment of Errollyn Wallen as the next Master of the King's Music.
- 26 August – BBC Radio 1 celebrates the 25th anniversary of the Live Lounge with the top 25 performances from the series as voted for by its presenters. In top place is Amy Winehouse's 2007 cover of "Valerie", a song originally recorded by the Zutons.
- 27 August – Oasis announce that they will reform for performances in the UK and Ireland in July and August 2025, stating: "The guns have fallen silent. The stars have aligned. The great wait is over. Come see. It will not be televised."
- 29 August – At the 2024 BBC Proms, Anja Bihlmaier conducts the annual Proms appearance by Glyndebourne Festival Opera, of Georges Bizet's Carmen, the first female conductor ever to conduct the annual Glyndebourne Festival Opera Prom.
- 31 August – Tickets for Oasis's 2025 reunion concert tour go on general sale, and sell out within a matter of hours.

=== September ===
- 2 September – Several hundred people are reported to have made official complaints about the way tickets for the Oasis reunion tour were advertised, while the UK government says it will look into the issue of "dynamic pricing".
- 5 September –
  - The Competition and Markets Authority (CMA) launches an investigation into the sale of Oasis tickets, following the band's announcement on 27 August and the use of "dynamic pricing".
  - Indie band English Teacher win the 2024 Mercury Prize for their debut album This Could Be Texas.
- 9 September – Sir John Eliot Gardiner announces the formation of a new orchestra and choir, the Constellation Orchestra and the Constellation Choir, under his leadership.
- 12 September – Wigmore Hall announces the prize recipients of its 2024 Wigmore Hall/Bollinger International Song Competition:
  - 1st Prize: Anja Mittermüller, mezzo-soprano (the youngest-ever winner of the competition at age 20)
  - 2nd Prize: Santiago Sánchez, tenor
  - 3rd Prize: Jonathan Eyers, baritone
  - Pianist's Prize: Jong Sun Woo
  - Special Finalist Prize: Mathilde Orscheidt, mezzo-soprano
- 14 September – The Last Night of the Proms takes place at the Royal Albert Hall, featuring American soprano Angel Blue.
- 17 September – Supergrass announce a reunion tour for 2025 to celebrate the 30th anniversary of the release of their debut album, I Should Coco.
- 18 September – The Royal Liverpool Philharmonic announces that Michael Eakin is to stand down as its chief executive in March 2025.
- 21 September – The 2024 Leeds International Piano Competition announces its prize recipients:
  - First Prize and the Dame Fanny Waterman Gold Medal: Jaeden Izik-Dzurko
  - Second Prize and the Marion Thorpe Silver Medal: Junyan Chen
  - Third Prize and the Lady Roslyn Lyons Bronze Medal: Khanh Nhi Luong
  - Fourth Prize: Kai-Min Chang
  - Fifth Prize: Julian Trevelyan
- 30 September – Oasis announces an American leg of its reunion tour, and that it will ditch dynamic pricing after it caused "an unacceptable experience" for UK fans trying to buy tickets.

=== October ===
- 3 October – It is announced that Newcastle will host the MOBO Awards for the first time in 2025.
- 8 October – Welsh rapper Lemfreck wins the 2024 Welsh Music Prize for his album Blood, Sweat and Fears.
- 11 October – Coldplay's 10th album, Moon Music, enters the UK Albums Chart at number one with sales of 237,000, and having outsold the combined total of albums in the rest of the top 40.
- 19–20 October – A series of vigils are held in the UK and elsewhere in the world for One Direction singer Liam Payne, who died in a fall from a hotel in Buenos Aires on 16 October.
- 20 October
  - The BBC announces Ryan Wang as the winner of the BBC Young Musician 2024 competition.
  - Ozzy Osbourne is inducted into the Rock and Roll Hall of Fame as a solo artist.
- 25 October – All five of One Direction's albums re-enter the UK Albums Chart following the death of Liam Payne.

=== November ===
- 5 November – Scottish Ensemble announces the appointment of James Hardie as its chief executive, effective January 2025.
- 6 November – Girls Aloud announce plans to release a new version of their cover of "I'll Stand by You" for Children in Need, with the lead vocals sung entirely by the late Sarah Harding, who died in 2021.
- 14 November – Myles Smith wins the 2024 BBC Introducing Artist of the Year Award.
- 21 November – The English National Opera announces its plans to relocate to Manchester, with the process to be completed by 2029.
- 23 November – Adele plays the 100th and final concert of her residency at Las Vegas's Caesars Palace.
- 24 November – Bassist Ursula Harrison is named BBC Young Jazz Musician 2024.
- 25 November – Sir Elton John tells ABC's Good Morning America he has been unable to finish his new album because of poor eyesight following an eye infection in July.
- 26 November – Rod Stewart is confirmed as being among the line up for Glastonbury 2025, and will play the Sunday teatime legends slot.
- 28 November – The Leeds International Piano Competition announces that Adam Gatehouse is to stand down as its artistic director in the spring of 2025.
- 29 November – The JG Windows music store in Newcastle's Central Arcade, described as the "cornerstone" of North East England's musical heritage for more than 100 years, has "closed permanently", its directors announce.
- 30 November – The Proclaimers perform at a memorial service for former first minister of Scotland Alex Salmond, held at Edinburgh's St Giles' Cathedral.

=== December ===
- 6 December
  - The Royal Mint unveils a collector's edition £5 coin featuring Sir Paul McCartney.
  - Sean Rafferty presents his final broadcast of In Tune on BBC Radio 3.
- 9 December – Crispin Hunt is elected new President of the PRS Members’ Council, succeeding Michelle Escoffery from 1 January 2025.
- 19 December – Sir Paul McCartney reunites with his former Beatles bandmate Sir Ringo Starr during a gig at London's O2 Arena.
- 20 December – Wham!'s "Last Christmas" becomes Christmas number one for the second consecutive year, beating songs by Mariah Carey, Gracie Abrams, Tom Grennan and Ariana Grande.
- 30 December – 2025 New Year Honours: Presenter and musician Myleene Klass is among those from the world of music to be recognised in the New Year Honours after receiving an MBE.
- 31 December – BBC One is scheduled to see in the New Year with Sophie Ellis-Bextor, who will perform and host a "New Year Disco".

== Bands formed ==
- XO

== Bands disbanded ==
- Atomic Kitten
- Average White Band
- Black Lace
- Black Midi
- UFO
- John Mayall & the Bluesbreakers
- Steve Harley & Cockney Rebel
- Sundara Karma
- Dario G

== Bands reformed ==
- Babyshambles
- Cardiacs
- Girls@Play
- Fairground Attraction
- Fast Food Rockers
- The Maccabees
- Moose Blood
- Oasis
- Rizzle Kicks
- Sex Pistols

== Classical works ==
- Thomas Adès – Aquifer
- Julian Anderson
  - String Quartet No. 4
  - Nothing At All (text adapted by Paul Griffiths from Hagoromo by Zeami Motokiyo)
- Richard Ayres
  - No. 57 (K's Strange Day)
  - No. 58 (Bruckner)
- Charlotte Bray – A Dark Doorway
- Anna Clyne
  - ATLAS (for piano and orchestra)
  - The Gorgeous Nothings (texts by Emily Dickinson)
- Amy Crankshaw – November moon readings
- Nathan James Dearden – Messages
- Jonathan Dove
  - Togetherness (for string quartet)
  - Odyssey (text by Alasdair Middleton)
- Iain Farrington – Extra Time
- Delyth Field – Shoegaze Capsule
- Michael Finnissy – Was frag Ich nach der Welt
- Helen Grime (music) and Zoe Gilbert (text) – Folk
- Gavin Higgins – Horn Concerto
- Simon Holt – Serra-Sierra
- Sir Stephen Hough –
  - Piano Concerto ('World of Yesterday')
  - Piano Quintet
- Dani Howard
  - Ascent
  - Three, Four AND...
- Stephen Johnson – Unquiet Sleepers
- Daniel Kidane – Aloud (violin concerto)
- Sir James MacMillan
  - Concerto for Orchestra (Ghosts)
  - Love Bade me Welcome (text by George Herbert)
- Luke Mombrea – Black Gold
- Jasmine Morris – Ca'
- Ben Nobuto – Hallelujah Sim.
- Electra Perivolaris – A Wave of Voices
- Mark Simpson (clarinetist) – Hold Your Heart in Your Teeth (viola concerto)
- Freya Waley-Cohen – Spell Book
- Errollyn Wallen – String Quintet
- Huw Watkins – Horn Concerto
- Dame Judith Weir – Planet
- Ryan Wigglesworth – Glasmelodien (after Mozart's Adagio in C, K.356)
- Roderick Williams (music) and Rommi Smith (texts) – Not Yet Here

== Charts and sales ==
=== Number-one singles ===
The singles chart includes a proportion for streaming.

Key
†	Best performing single of the year

Chart date (week ending)	Song	Artist(s)	Chart sales	References
4 January	"Last Christmas"	Wham!	96,653	
11 January	"Stick Season" †	Noah Kahan	59,000	
18 January	"Stick Season" †	Noah Kahan	65,834	
25 January	"Stick Season" †	Noah Kahan	72,235	
1 February	"Stick Season" †	Noah Kahan	82,424	
8 February	"Stick Season" †	Noah Kahan	76,191	
15 February	"Stick Season" †	Noah Kahan	71,175	
22 February	"Stick Season" †	Noah Kahan	70,862	
29 February	"Texas Hold 'Em"	Beyoncé	59,272	
7 March	"Texas Hold 'Em"	Beyoncé	73,280	
14 March	"Texas Hold 'Em"	Beyoncé	62,113	
21 March	"Texas Hold 'Em"	Beyoncé	53,005	
28 March	"Beautiful Things"	Benson Boone	54,642	
4 April	"Beautiful Things"	Benson Boone	57,067	
11 April	"Texas Hold 'Em"	Beyoncé	58,576	
18 April	"Too Sweet"	Hozier	61,030	
25 April	"Too Sweet"	Hozier	71,822	
2 May	"Fortnight"	Taylor Swift featuring Post Malone	93,451	
9 May	"Espresso"	Sabrina Carpenter	79,627	
16 May	"Espresso"	Sabrina Carpenter	76,506	
23 May	"Espresso"	Sabrina Carpenter	75,649	
30 May	"Espresso"	Sabrina Carpenter	72,898	
6 June	"Espresso"	Sabrina Carpenter	66,935	
13 June	"Houdini"	Eminem	104,803	
20 June	"Houdini"	Eminem	85,724	
27 June	"Please Please Please"	Sabrina Carpenter	88,962	
4 July	"Please Please Please"	Sabrina Carpenter	75,868	
11 July	"Please Please Please"	Sabrina Carpenter	61,495	
18 July	"Espresso"	Sabrina Carpenter	54,074	
25 July	"Espresso"	Sabrina Carpenter	51,679	
1 August	"Please Please Please"	Sabrina Carpenter	49,414	
8 August	"Please Please Please"	Sabrina Carpenter	46,019	
15 August	"Guess"	Charli XCX featuring Billie Eilish	56,709	
22 August	"Backbone"	Chase & Status and Stormzy	58,554	
29 August	"Backbone"	Chase & Status and Stormzy	49,017	
5 September	"Taste"	Sabrina Carpenter	67,477	
12 September	"Taste"	Sabrina Carpenter	68,496	
19 September	"Taste"	Sabrina Carpenter	57,988	
26 September	"Taste"	Sabrina Carpenter	58,352	
3 October	"Taste"	Sabrina Carpenter	53,149	
10 October	"Taste"	Sabrina Carpenter	52,878	
17 October	"Taste"	Sabrina Carpenter	51,717	
24 October	"Taste"	Sabrina Carpenter	47,263	
31 October	"Taste"	Sabrina Carpenter	43,913	
7 November	"Sailor Song"	Gigi Perez	39,001	
14 November	"That's So True"	Gracie Abrams	40,798	
21 November	"That's So True"	Gracie Abrams	54,549	
28 November	"That's So True"	Gracie Abrams	50,727	
5 December	"That's So True"	Gracie Abrams	49,848	
12 December	"That's So True"	Gracie Abrams	48,176	
19 December	"Last Christmas"	Wham!	46,188	
26 December	"Last Christmas"	Wham!	59,426	

=== Number-one albums ===
The albums chart includes a proportion for streaming.

Key
†	Best performing album of the year

Chart date (week ending)	Album	Artist(s)	Chart sales	References
4 January	Christmas	Michael Bublé	22,020	
11 January	Broken by Desire to Be Heavenly Sent	Lewis Capaldi	8,513	
18 January	A Matter of Time	Shed Seven	17,556	
25 January	Rolling Stone	D-Block Europe	18,397	
1 February	Saviors	Green Day	31,361	
8 February	Bitter Sweet Love	James Arthur	16,901	
15 February	Prelude to Ecstasy	The Last Dinner Party	32,846	
22 February	Stick Season	Noah Kahan	21,145	
29 February	Tangk	Idles	20,230	
7 March	Swing Fever	Rod Stewart and Jools Holland	23,950	
14 March	Liam Gallagher John Squire	Liam Gallagher and John Squire	39,395	
21 March	Eternal Sunshine	Ariana Grande	38,207	
28 March	Eternal Sunshine	Ariana Grande	16,292	
4 April	Audio Vertigo	Elbow	17,658	
11 April	Cowboy Carter	Beyoncé	39,990	
18 April	All Quiet on the Eastern Esplanade	The Libertines	21,706	
25 April	Yummy	James	18,542	
2 May	The Tortured Poets Department †	Taylor Swift	270,091	
9 May	The Tortured Poets Department †	Taylor Swift	49,698	
16 May	Radical Optimism	Dua Lipa	46,298	
23 May	The Tortured Poets Department †	Taylor Swift	29,740	
30 May	Hit Me Hard and Soft	Billie Eilish	67,111	
6 June	The Tortured Poets Department †	Taylor Swift	40,636	
13 June	The Tortured Poets Department †	Taylor Swift	24,495	
20 June	The Tortured Poets Department †	Taylor Swift	35,941	
27 June	The Tortured Poets Department †	Taylor Swift	17,648	
4 July	The Secret of Us	Gracie Abrams	22,883	
11 July	The Tortured Poets Department †	Taylor Swift	14,017	
18 July	Happenings	Kasabian	19,752	
25 July	The Death of Slim Shady (Coup de Grâce)	Eminem	45,063	
1 August	The Death of Slim Shady (Coup de Grâce)	Eminem	18,230	
8 August	The Death of Slim Shady (Coup de Grâce)	Eminem	10,757	
15 August	The Rise and Fall of a Midwest Princess	Chappell Roan	18,863	
22 August	This Is How Tomorrow Moves	Beabadoobee	17,202	
29 August	F-1 Trillion	Post Malone	19,223	
5 September	Short n' Sweet	Sabrina Carpenter	89,658	
12 September	Definitely Maybe	Oasis	52,376	
19 September	Luck and Strange	David Gilmour	29,363	
26 September	The Forest Is the Path	Snow Patrol	29,307	
3 October	Gary	Blossoms	21,884	
10 October	Liquid Gold	Shed Seven	25,622	
17 October	Moon Music	Coldplay	236,796	
24 October	Brat	Charli XCX	35,949	
31 October	Tension II	Kylie Minogue	35,235	
7 November	Chromakopia	Tyler, the Creator	25,079	
14 November	Songs of a Lost World	The Cure	51,362	
21 November	Together at Home	Michael Ball and Alfie Boe	13,522	
28 November	From Zero	Linkin Park	37,826	
5 December	GNX	Kendrick Lamar	25,771	
12 December	The Tortured Poets Department †	Taylor Swift	23,047	
19 December	The Tortured Poets Department †	Taylor Swift	23,259	
26 December	Short n' Sweet	Sabrina Carpenter	15,220	

=== Number-one compilation albums ===
The albums chart includes a proportion for streaming.

Chart date (week ending)	Album	Chart sales	References
4 January	Now Christmas	4,557	
11 January	Barbie the Album	3,236	
18 January	Wonka	2,760	
25 January	Now Yearbook Extra 1988	2,821	
1 February	Now 12" 80s: 1982 Part 1	2,850	
8 February	The Greatest Showman	2,695	
15 February	Hazbin Hotel	7,941	
22 February	Hazbin Hotel	7,346	
29 February	Hazbin Hotel	6,801	
7 March	Hazbin Hotel	6,235	
14 March	Hazbin Hotel	5,535	
21 March	Hazbin Hotel	4,978	
28 March	Now Jukebox Classics	5,376	
4 April	Hazbin Hotel	3,999	
11 April	Hazbin Hotel	3,708	
18 April	Now 117	10,351	
25 April	Now 117	3,820	
2 May	Now 117	2,817	
9 May	The Greatest Showman	2,766	
16 May	Now Yearbook 1974	5,030	
23 May	Eurovision Song Contest 2024	11,589	
30 May	Eurovision Song Contest 2024	5,738	
6 June	Eurovision Song Contest 2024	3,692	
13 June	Now Rock Anthems	3,593	
20 June	Now Yearbook Extra 1974	3,014	
27 June	The Greatest Showman	2,425	
4 July	The Greatest Showman	2,278	
11 July	Now Yearbook 1993	3,468	
18 July	The Greatest Showman	2,340	
25 July	Now 40 Years Part 2	3,362	
1 August	Twisters: The Album	3,118	
8 August	Now 118	10,008	
15 August	Now 118	4,071	
22 August	The Greatest Showman	2,754	
29 August	The Greatest Showman	2,721	
5 September	The Greatest Showman	2,701	
12 September	Now Yearbook 1987	5,137	
19 September	Now 80s 2024	3,589	
26 September	The Greatest Showman	2,432	
3 October	The Greatest Showman	2,446	
10 October	The Greatest Showman	2,514	
17 October	The Greatest Showman	2,551	
24 October	Saltburn	3,966	
31 October	The Greatest Showman	2,481	
7 November	Sunset Blvd – The Album	2,624	
14 November	Now Yearbook 1977	5,748	
21 November	The Greatest Showman	2,658	
28 November	Now 119	9,759	
5 December	Wicked: The Soundtrack	20,874	
12 December	Wicked: The Soundtrack	18,462	
19 December	Wicked: The Soundtrack	16,305	
26 December	Wicked: The Soundtrack	16,504	

== Year-end charts ==
=== Top singles of the year ===
This chart was published by the Official Charts Company on December 27, 2024

No.	Title	Artist(s)	Peak position	Combined
1	"Stick Season"	Noah Kahan	1	1,990,000
2	"Beautiful Things"	Benson Boone	1	1,790,000
3	"Espresso"	Sabrina Carpenter	1	1,750,000
4	"Lose Control"	Teddy Swims	2	
5	"Too Sweet"	Hozier	1	
6	"A Bar Song (Tipsy)"	Shaboozey	3	
7	"Birds of a Feather"	Billie Eilish	2	
8	"Good Luck, Babe!"	Chappell Roan	2	
9	"Austin"	Dasha	5	
10	"Please Please Please"	Sabrina Carpenter	1	
11	"Cruel Summer"	Taylor Swift	5 (Note: Reached number 2 in 2023)	
12	"Stargazing"	Myles Smith	4	
13	"Prada"	Cassö, Raye and D-Block Europe	3 (Note: Reached number 2 in 2023)	
14	"Texas Hold 'Em"	Beyoncé	1	
15	"I Had Some Help"	Post Malone featuring Morgan Wallen	2	
16	"Murder on the Dancefloor"	Sophie Ellis-Bextor	2 (Note: Originally peaked at number 2 in 2001)	
17	"I Like the Way You Kiss Me"	Artemas	3	
18	"Greedy"	Tate McRae	4 (Note: Reached number 3 in 2023)	
19	"Fortnight"	Taylor Swift featuring Post Malone	1	
20	"Scared to Start"	Michael Marcagi	9	
21	"Taste"	Sabrina Carpenter	1	
22	"Mr Brightside"	The Killers	31 (Note: Reached number 10 in 2004)	
23	"End of Beginning"	Djo	4	
24	"We Can't Be Friends (Wait For Your Love)"	Ariana Grande	2	
25	"Unwritten"	Natasha Bedingfield	12 (Note: Reached number 6 in 2004)	
26	"Houdini"	Eminem	1	
27	"Belong Together"	Mark Ambor	11	
28	"Lovin on Me"	Jack Harlow	2 (Note: Reached number 1 in 2023)	
29	"Million Dollar Baby"	Tommy Richman	3	
30	"Last Christmas"	Wham!	1	
31	"Slow It Down"	Benson Boone	14	
32	"The Door"	Teddy Swims	5	
33	"Hot to Go!"	Chappell Roan	4	
34	"Kisses"	Bl3ss and CamrinWatsin featuring bbyclose	5	
35	"Alibi"	Ella Henderson and Rudimental	10	
36	"Riptide"	Vance Joy	49 (Note: Reached number 10 in 2014)	
37	"Die With a Smile"	Lady Gaga and Bruno Mars	2	
38	"I Can Do It With a Broken Heart"	Taylor Swift	8	
39	"I Remember Everything"	Zach Bryan featuring Kacey Musgraves	14	
40	"Everywhere"	Fleetwood Mac	70 (Note: Reached number 4 in 1988)	

=== Best-selling albums ===
This chart was published by the Official Charts Company on December 31, 2024

No.	Title	Artist	Peak position	Combined
1	The Tortured Poets Department	Taylor Swift	1	783,800
2	The Highlights	The Weeknd	2	
3	Short n' Sweet	Sabrina Carpenter	1	
4	Stick Season	Noah Kahan	1	
5	Hit Me Hard and Soft	Billie Eilish	1	
6	The Rise and Fall of a Midwest Princess	Chappell Roan	1	
7	50 Years – Don't Stop	Fleetwood Mac	7 (Note: Reached number 5 in 2018)	
8	Brat	Charli XCX	1	
9	Moon Music	Coldplay	1	
10	Guts	Olivia Rodrigo	2 (Note: Reached number 1 in 2023)	
11	Time Flies... 1994-2009	Oasis	3 (Note: Reached number 1 in 2010)	
12	Diamonds	Elton John	4 (Note: Reached number 2 in 2023)	
13	Curtain Call: The Hits	Eminem	5 (Note: Reached number 1 in 2005)	
14	ABBA Gold	ABBA	4 (Note: Reached number 1 in 1992)	
15	1989 (Taylor's Version)	Taylor Swift	2 (Note: Reached number 1 in 2023)	
16	The Essential Michael Jackson	Michael Jackson	14 (Note: Reached number 1 in 2009)	
17	Lover	Taylor Swift	7 (Note: Reached number 1 in 2019)	
18	Sour	Olivia Rodrigo	10 (Note: Reached number 1 in 2021)	
19	Folklore	Taylor Swift	9 (Note: Reached number 1 in 2020)	
20	Definitely Maybe	Oasis	1	
21	AM	Arctic Monkeys	16 (Note: Reached number 1 in 2013)	
22	Midnights	Taylor Swift	6 (Note: Reached number 1 in 2022)	
23	Rumours	Fleetwood Mac	9 (Note: Reached number 1 in 1978)	
24	(What's the Story) Morning Glory?	Oasis	4 (Note: Reached number 1 in 1995)	
25	Greatest Hits	Queen	17 (Note: Reached number 1 in 1981)	
26	SOS	SZA	15 (Note: Reached number 2 in 2022)	
27	Reputation	Taylor Swift	12 (Note: Reached number 1 in 2017)	
28	The Diamond Collection	Post Malone	17 (Note: Reached number 14 in 2023)	
29	Eternal Sunshine	Ariana Grande	1	
30	Legend	Bob Marley and the Wailers	6 (Note: Reached number 1 in 1984)	
31	Papercuts (Singles Collection 2000-2023)	Linkin Park	4	
32	The Death of Slim Shady (Coup de Grâce)	Eminem	1	
33	Curtain Call 2	Eminem	24 (Note: Reached number 3 in 2022)	
34	I've Tried Everything but Therapy (Part 1)	Teddy Swims	12	
35	Singles	Maroon 5	28	
36	Born to Die	Lana Del Rey	24 (Note: Reached number 1 in 2012)	
37	÷	Ed Sheeran	27 (Note: Reached number 1 in 2017)	
38	Twenty Five	George Michael	22 (Note: Reached number 1 in 2006)	
39	Nursery Rhymes by Cocomelon	Cocomelon	28	
40	Radical Optimism	Dua Lipa	1	

== Deaths ==
- 4 January
  - Glynis Johns, 100, South African-born British actress and singer (Mary Poppins, A Little Night Music).
  - David Soul, 80, American-born actor (Starsky & Hutch) and singer ("Don't Give Up on Us").
- 5 January – Del Palmer, 71, English singer-songwriter, bass guitarist, and sound engineer.
- 7 January – Tony Clarkin, 77, English guitarist and songwriter (Magnum).
- 11 January – Annie Nightingale, 83, English radio DJ and television broadcaster
- 12 January – David Lumsdaine, Australian composer resident in the UK, 92
- 16 January – Laurie Johnson, 96, English composer and bandleader.
- 18 January – Ivan Moody, 59, classical composer and musicologist.
- 2 February
  - Steve Brown, 66, British composer, lyricist and record producer, pulmonary fibrosis.
  - Derrick McIntyre, 66, English bassist (Jamiroquai), worked with (Emeli Sande), (Will Young), (Beverley Knight).
- 4 February – Mallorca Lee, 51, Scottish DJ, producer, (Ultra-Sonic), (Public Domain).
- 12 February
  - Stewart Robertson, classical conductor, 75
  - Steve Wright, 69, English radio DJ, television presenter.
- 14 February – Patrick Ireland, classical violist and founding violist of the Allegri String Quartet, 100
- 15 February – Ian Amey, 79, English musician and singer (Dave Dee, Dozy, Beaky, Mick & Tich).
- 22 February – John Lowe, 81, English pianist (The Quarrymen).
- 10 March – Karl Wallinger, 66, Welsh musician (The Waterboys, World Party) and songwriter ("Ship of Fools").
- 12 March – James Whitbourn, 60, British composer and conductor.
- 13 March
  - Dick Allix, 78, British drummer (Vanity Fare) and darts official.
  - John Blunt, British drummer (The Searchers). (death announced on this date)
- 14 March – Angela McCluskey, 64, Scottish singer (Wild Colonials) and songwriter ("Breathe").
- 17 March – Steve Harley, 73, English musician (Steve Harley & Cockney Rebel), songwriter ("Make Me Smile (Come Up and See Me)", "Mr. Soft") and producer, cancer.
- 25 March – Chris Cross, 71, English bassist (Ultravox)
- 29 March – Gerry Conway, 76, English drummer and percussionist (Jethro Tull, Fairport Convention, Cat Stevens).
- 7 April – Chryssie Lytton Cobbold, Baroness Cobbold, 83, British aristocrat and organiser of the Knebworth Festival.
- 11 April – Robin Field, 88, Lakeland composer
- 20 April – Sir Andrew Davis, 80, English conductor.
- 21 April – MC Duke, British rapper.
- 23 April – Fergie MacDonald, 86, Scottish accordionist.
- 24 April – Mike Pinder, 82, English Hall of Fame musician (The Moody Blues) and songwriter ("The Best Way to Travel", "A Simple Game").
- 1 May – Richard Tandy, 76, English Hall of Fame musician (Electric Light Orchestra, The Move).
- 15 May – John Hawken, 84, English keyboardist (The Nashville Teens, Renaissance, Strawbs).
- 18 May – Frank Ifield, 86, English-Australian singer, musician
- 2 June – Colin Gibb, 70, English guitarist, singer (Black Lace)
- 7 June – Rose-Marie, 68, Northern Irish singer and television personality.
- 10 June – Michael Graubart, 93, Austrian-born English conductor, composer and academic
- 11 June – Gaps Hendrickson, British musician and vocalist (The Selecter). (death reported on this date)
- 17 June – Paul Spencer, 53, English musician (Dario G).
- 19 June – James Loughran, 92, Scottish conductor.
- 30 June – Peter Collins, 73, English record producer (Power Windows, Operation: Mindcrime, These Days). (death announced on this date)
- 6 July – Joe Egan, 77, Scottish singer (Stealers Wheel) and songwriter ("Stuck in the Middle with You", "Star").
- 16 July – April Cantelo, 96, English soprano.
- 17 July – Heather Wood, 79, English folk singer (The Young Tradition). (death announced on this date)
- 22 July – John Mayall, 90, English musician, songwriter, producer (John Mayall & the Bluesbreakers).
- 25 July – Benjamin Luxon, English classical baritone, 87
- 31 July – DJ Randall, 54, British DJ and record producer.
- 9 August – Carl Bevan, 51, Welsh rock drummer (60 Ft. Dolls) and painter. (death announced on this date)
- 16 August – Charles Blackwell, 84, English arranger, record producer and songwriter. (death announced on this date)
- 20 August – Christopher Pollard, classical music magazine editor, 67
- 21 August – Russell Stone, 77–78, English singer (R&J Stone).
- 26 August – Alexander Goehr, 92, classical composer and academic.
- 27 August – Richard Macphail, 73, English musician (Anon), road manager (Genesis) and businessman.
- 30 August – Danielle Moore, 52, English musician (Crazy P).
- 5 September –
  - Derek Boshier, 87, English pop artist.
  - Herbie Flowers, 86, English musician (Blue Mink, T. Rex, Sky).
  - Martin France, 60, British jazz drummer.
- 8 September –
  - Zoot Money, 82, English vocalist and keyboardist (Eric Burdon and The Animals, Zoot Money's Big Roll Band).
  - Ben Thapa, 42, English opera singer (G4).
- 12 September – Robin Guy, 54, British drummer (Sham 69, All About Eve).
- 17 September – Kenny Hyslop, 73, Scottish drummer (Slik, Zones, Simple Minds). (death announced on this date)
- 29 September
  - Martin Lee, 77, English singer (Brotherhood of Man) and songwriter ("Save Your Kisses for Me", "Angelo"), heart failure.
  - Rohan de Saram, 85, British-born Sri Lankan cellist.
- 10 October – Mary Mogil, choral conductor, singer, pedagogue, and voice trainer, 83
- 11 October – John Barstow, pianist and teacher, 87
- 12 October – Jackmaster, 38, Scottish DJ.
- 16 October – Liam Payne, 31, English pop singer (One Direction).
- 21 October – Paul Di'Anno, 66, English heavy metal singer (Iron Maiden) and songwriter ("Running Free"). (death announced on this date)
- 12 November – Barrie Gavin, film and television director, 89
- 14 November
  - Dennis Bryon, 75, Welsh drummer (Amen Corner, Bee Gees).
  - Peter Sinfield, 80, English lyricist ("21st Century Schizoid Man", "I Believe in Father Christmas"), musician (King Crimson), and record producer.
- 18 November – J. Saul Kane, 55, English DJ and musician. (death announced on this date)
- 21 November – Laura Samuel, orchestra leader (BBC Scottish Symphony Orchestra) and founding member of the Belcea Quartet, 48
- 1 December – Samantha Lawrence, 55, British hip-hop artist (Wee Papa Girl Rappers).
- 4 December – Christopher Wright, composer, 70, pneumonia
- 10 December – Lennie De Ice, 54, British musician ("We Are I.E."). (death announced on this date)
- 18 December – Steve Lewinson, 60, British bass guitarist (Simply Red).
- 31 December – Johnnie Walker, 79, English radio DJ and broadcaster.

== See also ==
- 2024 in British radio
- 2024 in British television
- 2024 in the United Kingdom
- List of British films of 2024
