= Helter Skelter (rave music promoter) =

Music festival in the United Kingdom

- Genre: Happy Hardcore; drum and bass; techno
- Location: United Kingdom
- Years active: 1989-2009
- Founders: David Pratley
- Attendance: 18,000

Helter Skelter was one of the longest running dance music promoters in the UK, which began organising megaraves in the early 1990s. Its largest-ever rave was "Energy 97 – The Carnival of Dance" in Northamptonshire which attracted 18,000 revellers, playing happy hardcore, drum and bass, and techno. By New Year's Eve 1999, its popularity had declined, as garage music clubs became more mainstream. It regularly held events at Sanctuary Music Arena in Milton Keynes until its closure.

== History ==
The Helter Skelter organisation was founded in September 1989 in the midst of the acid house party era by David Pratley and his wife Penny. They were inspired by the early M25 motorway orbital raves. Helter Skelter's first event was an illegal outdoor rave but subsequent nights were held in nightclubs.

Helter Skelter then began hosting events at the 3,000-capacity Sanctuary Music Arena in Milton Keynes. The Milton Keynes events underwent an expansion in the mid-1990s, using the roller rink adjacent to The Sanctuary, expanding the capacity to 8,000.

The popularity of double-arena parties led Helter Skelter to organise Energy '97 – The Carnival of Dance. The festival took place at Turweston Aerodrome in Northamptonshire (now the site of the Gatecrasher Summer Sound System festivals). The festival attracted 18,000 revellers, an all-time high. Ten huge marquees played genres of dance music including hardcore, drum and bass, and techno, and hosted 85 UK artists, DJs and MCs.

Helter Skelter held a Millennium Jam on New Year's Eve, 1999. By then, the number of ravers had decreased, as garage house music started to become more popular.

After a hiatus, Helter Skelter returned with an event at the 4,500-capacity venue Bowlers in Trafford, Manchester, in association with the Northern dance music organisation, Compulsion. Helter Skelter also returned to the Sanctuary Music Arena, but with a new music policy. Pratley collaborated with the event management team from Club Sidewinder and introduced specialist drum and bass events, branded as Accelerated Culture, which hosted arenas at festivals including Global Gathering.

Following the closure of the Sanctuary Music Arena in 2004, Helter Skelter returned to the Plaza in Milton Keynes on New Year's Eve. It continued with the Accelerated Culture brand in Birmingham and brought drum and bass and old school hardcore to a predominantly house music-orientated Ibiza.

In 2005, Helter Skelter and the Ministry of Sound released a compilation CD, Hardcore Classics, mixed by Billy Daniel Bunter and Slipmatt, which peaked at number 2 in the UK Compilation Chart. Further compilations followed: United In Hardcore (2006), a versus mix with Raindance in Hardcore (2007) and Billy Daniel Bunter and Slipmatt, Helter Skelter & Raindance Present The Sound Of Hardcore (2009).

== See also ==
- Sanctuary Music Arena
- List of electronic music festivals
