= Aynhoe Park =

Country house and estate in England

Coordinates: 51.9933°N 1.2531°W

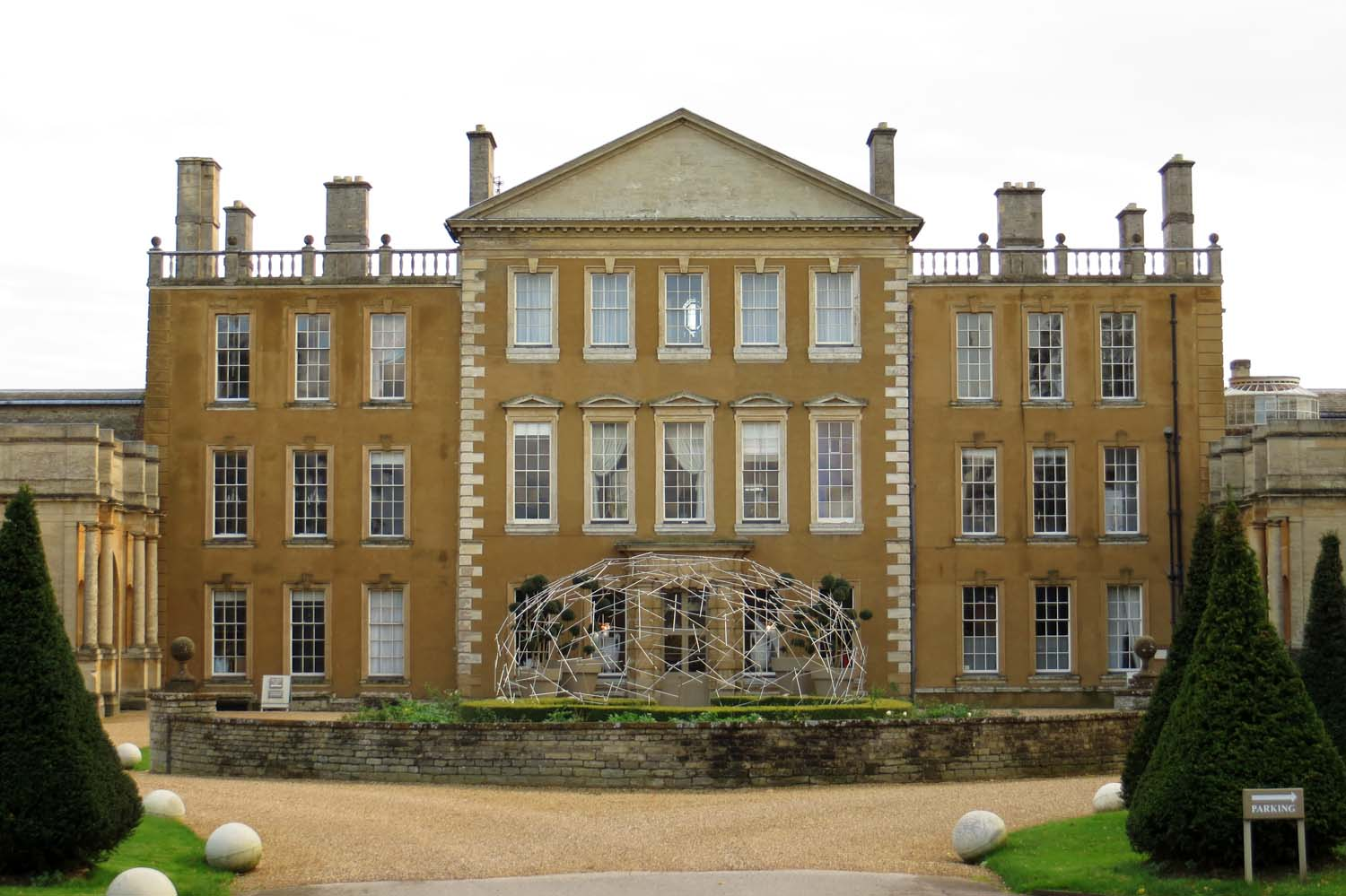
Aynhoe Park

Aynhoe Park (alternately known as Aynho Park) is a 17th-century country estate consisting of land and buildings that were rebuilt after the English Civil War on the southern edge of the stone-built village of Aynho, Northamptonshire, England. It overlooks the Cherwell valley that divides Northamptonshire from Oxfordshire. The core buildings represent four architectural periods: Jacobean, Carolean and both the early 18th and 19th centuries.

Up to 1954, it was the family home of the Cartwright family. Since then, it was used for fifty years as a retirement apartment complex.

Since 2020 the estate has been owned by RH as the site of their retail and hospitality experience "RH England, The Gallery at Aynho Park", and the location of a white deer farm producing high-end venison.

It has been listed Grade I on the National Heritage List for England since September 1953. Its wider grounds form part of a Grade II listed 'Park and Garden'.

== History ==
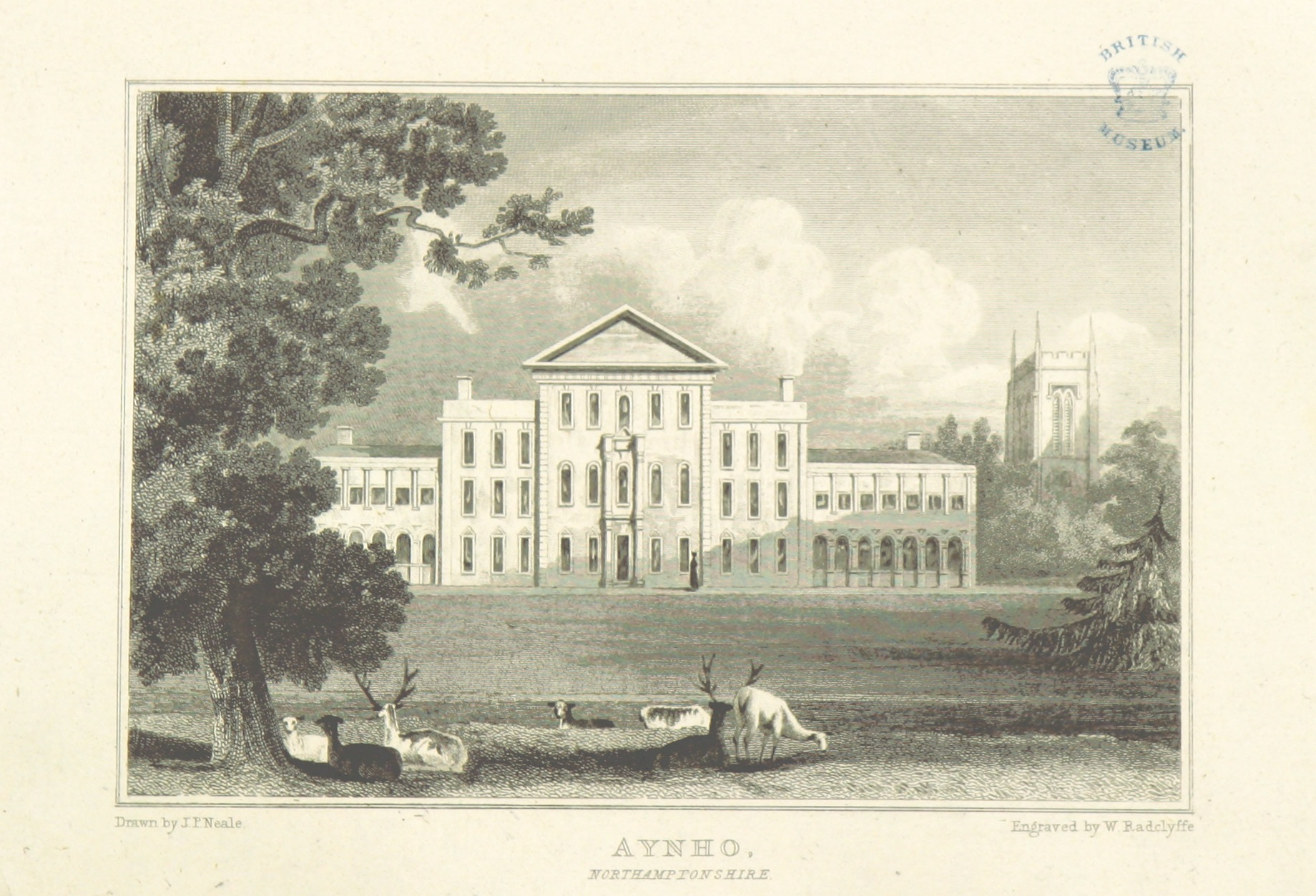
View of Aynhow Park, published 1818

The estate was purchased in the 17th century by John Cartwright, but the house he built in 1615 was seriously damaged during the Civil War by Royalist forces following the Battle of Naseby. It was rebuilt after the Civil War to the design of Edward Marshall, master mason in Charles II's Office of Works. In 1707, Thomas Cartwright employed Thomas Archer to enlarge the Jacobean building. At the beginning of the 19th century, the house was embellished by Sir John Soane.

Aynhoe Park is a pedimented main block with lower service blocks on each side forming a courtyard. The arrangement dates from the early 18th century when Thomas Archer was commissioned to enlarge the Jacobean house. Archer, who had visited Italy, added unusual late-Baroque detailing, such as the concave surrounds to the central doorways of the service blocks. The middle of the garden front remained largely unchanged since it was built in the 1660s.

The interiors, created by Archer with the exception of the main staircase, have been remodelled. Aynhoe Park has, however, retained the rooms designed by Soane. He was instructed to prepare designs for a thorough remodelling of the interior in 1795—drawings for this work can be seen in the Sir John Soane's Museum in London; but these interiors were never built. Soane did redesign the reception rooms along the garden front in a modest style in 1800–5 and, with the exception of the French Drawing Room, these interiors have survived and illustrate the architect's exploitation of curved surfaces. Soane also created the top-lit staircase with its iron balustrade in the south wing and the "triumphal arches" which link the main block to the service wings. There is an exhibition of Soane's work at the estate, a collaboration between RH and the museum.

The surroundings represent an early formal garden with landscape park. Gardens were laid out by Mr Guilliam 1701–14, and the park laid out 1760–63 by Capability Brown.

Although still owned by the Cartwright family, the estate was leased at the time of the 1861 census to the Australian pastoral pioneer and politician William Forlonge and during the twentieth century was home to Richard Fairfax William Cartwright, JP. The estate was the subject of a series of articles in Country Life magazine by Gordon Nares in July 1953. Cartwright and his only son and heir were killed in a car crash in 1954 (there was also one daughter).

== Modern era ==
Aynhoe Park was acquired by the Country Houses Association in the 1950s, an organisation focused on finding alternative uses for former stately homes too large to be used as a single dwelling. Under the CHA's ownership the main block and service wings at the estate were converted into multiple retirement apartments, and were used as such until the CHA went into liquidation in 2004.

The estate was acquired by event promoter James Perkins in 2006 and the estate was remodelled to make it economically viable through commercial activities. The service wings were initially converted to office use (use class B1), and the retirement apartments in the main block were converted to a venue for catered weddings, parties, displays and conferences, with 41 en suite bedrooms providing overnight accommodation for guests. The venue also offered spa facilities including a pool, a catering kitchen, and licensed bars on the ground floor and in the cellar of the main block. The venue proved to be a popular venue for celebrity weddings; and musician Noel Gallagher held his 50th birthday party at the venue. A retail shop was also added in the main block that was used for Perkins' art and antique business, and car parking facilities were expanded for 90+ cars for guests. An acclaimed sustainable white deer farm was re-established and remains in operation at the estate, selling more than 100 deer per year by 2019, and continuing to do so today.

The service wings were converted into seven self-contained apartments (use class C3) under a planning permission granted in 2013, and three further brand new dwellings were being constructed on the grounds of the estate by 2020. In 2019, Perkins successfully applied for planning permission to regularise the existing use of the estate as an events venue with integrated hospitality and accommodation, and as a retail space, with separate owner's living quarters in the lower floors of the west wing (where he and his family had lived and continued to live until they left the property). A sui generis planning designation was granted.

The entire estate was sold in mid-2020 to the US furniture group RH, who stated their intention to rebrand the estate RH England, The Gallery at Aynho Park and to continue to use it for hospitality and retail. Perkins remained at the estate under a short-term lease, leaving after having disposed of his art collection at the estate in a high-profile auction in January 2021. RH England, The Gallery at Aynho Park opened in June 2023, with three restaurants and three 'secondary' hospitality experiences.
