= Top Buzz =

UK musical group

- Origin: London, United Kingdom
- Genres: House, breakbeat hardcore; jungle
- Years active: 1988–2023
- Label: Basement
- Past members: Mad P; Mikee B; Jason Kaye

Top Buzz were a British breakbeat hardcore and jungle DJ/MC crew.

== History ==
Top Buzz were originally formed in 1988 by MC Patrick Jarrett ("Mad P"), DJ Mikee B and DJ Jason Kaye. All three are from Tottenham and Enfield in north London.

They were one of the first groups to popularise the term jungle techno, meaning to encompass both jungle and techno influences as it began to emerge from the hardcore sound from 1991. They released Livin' in Darkness on Basement Records in 1992. They were headline performers at Amnesia House, Fantazia, Universe, Dreamscape and Obsession events, amongst others.

A distinct feature was the ragga MCing of MC Patrick, strongly influenced by Jamaican dancehall. Patrick often referred to the team as "Two Blacks and a Bubble", a reference to their ethnic origins, with 'bubble' referring to Bubble and Squeak, the Cockney rhyming slang for Greek (Kaye is of Greek Cypriot descent).

Mikee B moved on to become part of UK garage outfit Dreem Teem, with a slot on BBC Radio 1 until May 2005.

Jason Kaye went on to become a DJ, producer and promoter of UK garage. He founded the underground UK record label Social Circles and, with Terry Turbo, the 'Garage Nation' series of events.

Patrick Jarrett trained as a chef, a profession he has continued to practise. Jarrett is the son of Cynthia Jarrett, who died in the Broadwater Farm Estate riots in London in 1985.

Mad P and Kaye continued to perform as Top Buzz until Kaye's death on 11 March 2023.

== Selected discography ==
=== Selected singles/EPs ===
- Livin' in Darkness/Violas Delight (Basement, 1992)
- Livin' in Darkness 93/Maintain Her (Basement, 1993)
- Livin a Dream/The Wok (Basement, 1994)

=== Selected mixes ===
- Dreamscape Vol. 02 - The Vision (Dreamscape, 1997)
