= DJ Randall =

British DJ and record producer (1970–2024)

- Born: Randall McNeil; 2 April 1970
- Origin: East London, England
- Died: 31 July 2024 (aged 54)
- Genres: Breakbeat hardcore; jungle; drum and bass
- Occupations: DJ; record producer
- Years active: 1989–2024
- Labels: Reinforced Records; Mac II Recordings

Randall McNeil (2 April 1970 – 31 July 2024), better known as DJ Randall, was a British jungle and drum and bass DJ and record producer.

== Biography ==
Randall was introduced to DJ scratching and mixing in the late 1980s. He first encountered acid house music at the 1987 Notting Hill Carnival which led to him buying records and listening to other DJs. His first playing out was at the 'Delirium' warehouse parties in Stratford, East London. This also led to his first appearance on pirate radio on Centreforce in 1989.

His big break would come when appearing at the rave 'Living Dream' held in Leyton. Although he was already booked to play, the non-appearance of Colin Faver meant that Randall played a 2 and a half hour set.

He quickly rose to become one of the most prominent DJs of the breakbeat hardcore scene. He was a co-owner of the De Underground record shop and label based in Forest Gate (instrumental in releasing the track "We Are I.E." by Lennie De Ice), alongside fellow DJs Cool Hand Flex and Mike De Underground, and producer Uncle 22.

Randall would become a regular at nights such as Orange at the Rocket, Dreamscape, but it was his residency at AWOL that he is most remembered. During this time, he started to first produce and release records on De Underground as well as Reinforced Records.

In 1994, Randall produced the track "Sound Control" with Andy C, released on RAM Records. He also regularly hosted the jungle show on Kiss 100.

In 1997, he founded the Mac II record label, and was still performing up until his death on 31 July 2024, at the age of 54.
