= Sanctuary Music Arena =

Former dance venue in Milton Keynes

- The front of the Sanctuary Music Arena
- Interactive map of Sanctuary Music Arena
- Location: Milton Keynes, England
- Owner: Tony Rosenberg
- Capacity: 3,500 Sanctuary; 3,000 Fastrack; 2,500 Rollers
- Events: Dance music, live music

Construction
- Opened: December 1991
- Closed: July 2004

The Sanctuary Music Arena was a 22,000 sq ft, 3,500 capacity music venue in Denbigh North, Milton Keynes in the UK, and most well known for its connection to the rave scene.

The success of the first Dreamscape events led to the building being re-purposed to a dedicated music venue, and hosting promoters such as Helter Skelter, Gatecrasher, Slammin Vinyl, and Garage Nation, until its eventual closure in 2004.

== Origins ==
The site was originally intended for industrial use, as part of the wider Bletchley plan in the 1950s that saw the development of the adjacent Denbigh West industrial area. Designed in 1989 by Dryden-Johnson Architects, the unit was built speculatively in 1990 to host Indoor Cricket but failed to find a tenant for that purpose.

It was first used as a music venue by ESP Promotions to host their inaugural Dreamscape raves from December 1991, when the late Murray Beetson had reached an agreement with the landlord for short-term event hire.

== Dreamscape ==
Dreamscape
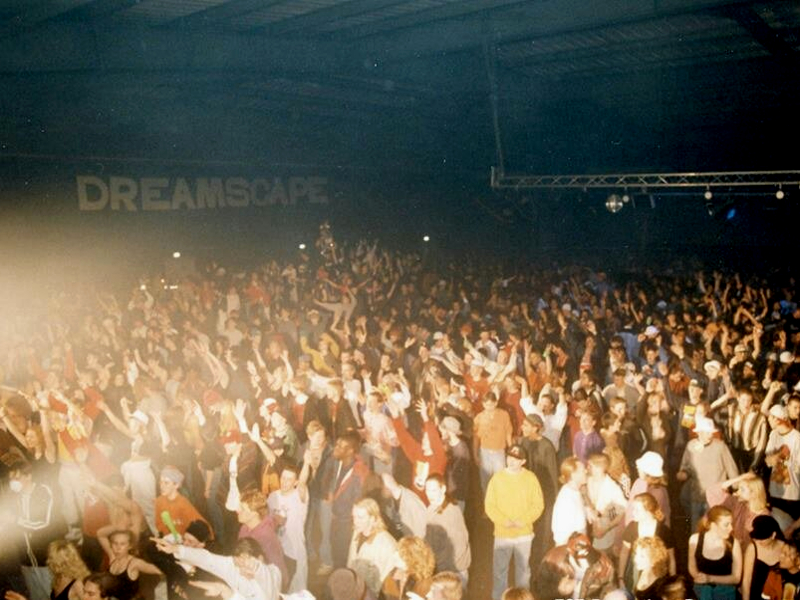
- Dreamscape rave at the Sanctuary, 1994
- Genre: Breakbeat hardcore; happy hardcore; drum and bass
- Years active: 1991-1998
- Founders: Murray Beetson (ESP Promotions)

Beetson had been looking for a larger venue after the success of his ESP Promotions nights at the Roadmender in Northampton and Milwaukees nightclub in Bedfordshire.

As the building was never designed for this purpose, there were a number of licensing conditions to be met before the go ahead was given by the local authorities, one of which was the installation of additional fire exits – at ESP's expense – to cope with the planned 4,000 capacity. Due to the success of the four Dreamscape parties held at the venue from December 1991 to May 1992 (each party selling out in advance), entrepreneur Tony Rosenberg purchased the site and had it re-purposed into a dedicated music venue.

After closing in the autumn of 1992 for the redevelopment work to take place, the venue reopened in December as The Sanctuary Music Arena and included dedicated bar facilities, with an ancient Rome theme running throughout, as well as adding a second smaller dance arena upstairs. Due to the redesign and additional features, the licensed capacity of the venue was reduced to 3,500 people.

Between 1991 and 1998, thirty Dreamscape nights were organised, many at the Sanctuary, but it also led to a club tour across the UK visiting venues including The Edge in Coventry.

ESP Promotions also released two Dreamscape mix CD compilations, Dreamscape Vol. 1 - Extra Sensory Perception (mixed by Slipmatt, DJ Sy, and DJ Randall) and Dreamscape Vol.2 - The Vision (mixed by DJ Vibes, Mickey Finn, and Top Buzz).

Beetson died 17 March 1996 in a car accident.

== Wider popularity ==
With the success of Dreamscape, the venue became pivotal in the development of numerous underground electronic dance music genres and scenes, and played host to the UK's biggest promoters of the time such as Helter Skelter, Slammin Vinyl, Garage Nation, Sidewinder, Gatecrasher, Cream, and Godskitchen. The venue attracted a national audience to its 12-hour all night events.

As well as rave events, several high-profile live music acts appeared at The Sanctuary, including The Cult, The Prodigy, Brand New Heavies, Gary Numan, and Paul Weller.

Starting with the Dreamscape New Year's Eve 1994 event, promoters would occasionally use the adjacent "Rollers UK" roller skating rink as an extra dance arena in conjunction with The Sanctuary. Later still (early 2000s), event promoters Slammin' Vinyl also made use of the "Fastrack" go-karting arena (the third and final unit on the site), creating a 9,000 capacity multi-arena dance venue, one of the largest of its kind in the country.

== Regulation ==
The close association of rave with drug culture resulted in the public entertainment licence of The Sanctuary being challenged several times and some local opposition. Generally the local council were supportive as were Thames Valley Police, with Rosenberg introducing harm minimisation and health and safety precautions alongside policing of the sale of illegal substances within the venue.

In 1997, through a police challenge to The Sanctuary licence, the owner sought the assistance of the then MP for Milton Keynes South Dr. Phyllis Starkey, bringing to the attention of the MP the issues of licensing and in particular, the need for regulated door and event security ("bouncers"). This subsequently led to Dr. Starkey's Private Members Bill to Parliament in 1998 which although unsuccessful, eventually persuaded the Government to introduce the Private Security Industry Act 2001, leading to the formation of the Security Industry Authority in 2003.

== Closure and legacy ==
Due to plans to redevelop the area, the Sanctuary finally closed its doors on 10 July 2004 with rave promoter Slammin Vinyl hosting the final event. The Sanctuary (and surrounding buildings) were subsequently demolished to make way for a new IKEA store.

In September 2008, a flashmob event was organised on social networking resulting in a five-minute "rave" within the store.

The Sanctuary was the subject of a January 2022 exhibition at the MK Gallery, celebrating 30 years of the venue.

== See also ==
- Helter Skelter (rave music promoter)
- Fantazia (rave music promoter)
- List of electronic dance music venues
