= De Underground Records =

London record shop, studio and record label

De Underground Records was a record shop, studio, and record label located at 18 Sebert Road, Forest Gate, London, operating from 1991 until 1996.

The shop and its associated labels, including In Touch Records, I.E. Records, Reel to Reel, Ruff Groove, U No Dat, Oddball, Pure Energy, and the home brand De Underground Records released many seminal tracks including Lennie De Ice's seminal track "We Are I.E." in 1991. Co-owned by Michael Aymer (Mike De Underground), his brother Peter Aymer (the DJ Cool Hand Flex), Desmond Fearon (the producer Uncle 22), and Randall McNeil (DJ Randall), the shop was a hub for emerging sounds and artists.

== Legacy ==
In May 2021, Newham Council erected a blue plaque where the shop and label had its premises, in recognition of its contributions to "the development of UK hardcore, jungle and drum and bass music".

The Crate Digging: The Influence of De Underground Records initiative, a project initiated by Rendezvous Projects for Newham Heritage Month 2021, was launched to document and preserve the history of De Underground Records, focusing on its impact on jungle and drum and bass music. This effort aimed to make the shop and studio's undocumented history accessible to the public for education and cultural preservation.
