= John Makepeace =

British furniture designer and maker (born 1939)

John Makepeace OBE FCSD (born John Makepeace Smith; 6 July 1939) is a British furniture designer and maker. Makepeace was born in Solihull, Warwickshire. He bought Parnham House, Dorset in 1976 and founded the Parnham Trust and the School for Craftsmen in Wood (opened 19 September 1977, later to become Parnham College) to provide integrated courses in design, making and management for aspiring furniture-makers, alongside but separately from his own furniture workshops. Makepeace ceased running the Trust in 2000 when it moved to the new campus at Hooke Park under a new director who handed the premises over to the Architectural Association, the international school of architecture, for their practical modules. Makepeace sold Parnham House in 2001 to Michael and Emma Treichl, who carried out extensive renovations, before the fire in 2017 and Michael's suicide. Makepeace works predominantly for private clients, but previously designed furniture for the retail market including Habitat, Heals and Liberty's.

== Early life ==
Makepeace was born John Makepeace Smith in Solihull, Warwickshire on 6 July 1939. He is the child of Harold Alfred Smith and Gladys Marjorie Smith. Though his surname was Smith, on 27 November 1963, he would go on to change take up the surname "Makepeace", the same as his maternal grandmother's maiden name. Makepeace was first introduced to woodworking when he was eleven years old when he first visited a furniture maker. During his teenage years, he discovered his love for the craft when he met different cabinetmakers in Copenhagen.

== Career ==
Makepeace's woodworking career began when he started to work as a design consultant for the all India Handicraft Board. He began to also receive recognition when he became a member of the Crafts Council and the Red Rose Guild in the UK and a Trustee of the V&A, London. Seeing the value of education furniture designers/makers, he bought Parnham House, Dorset in 1976, to create the Parnham Trust and the School for Craftsmen in Wood. This was opened on 19 September 1977, though would later become Parnham College. One of his early students here was Viscount Linley, nephew of Queen Elizabeth II of the United Kingdom. Makepeace would run the Trust until 2000, when it moved to Hooke Park under a new director.

== Published works ==
Year Published	Book	Author(s)
1980	The Art of Making Furniture	John Makepeace
1989	Encyclopedia of Wood	John Makepeace
1994	Conservation by Design	John Makepeace
