= James Perkins (businessman) =

British businessman

- Born: James Edward Perkins; April 1969 (age 57)
- Occupation: Businessman
- Spouse: Sophie Perkins
- Children: 3
- Website: james-perkins.co.uk

James Edward Perkins is a British businessman. He was a co-founder of rave organiser Fantazia, and for 14 years the owner of Aynhoe Park, a 17th-century country estate in Aynho, Northamptonshire, before it was bought by the American company RH. He is the current owner of Parnham House.

== Career ==
Perkins grew up in Cheltenham. His mother was an antique dealer from whom he acquired an interest in collecting. He later also became involved in the antique trade in the West Country. He started organizing parties from the age of 15 in Cheltenham, later he hosted black-tie balls in the Cotswolds and then large-scale raves. He was a co-founder of the Fantazia brand in 1991, which organised a series of rave music events in the 1990s, including what was then the largest rave in the world at Castle Donington in 1992 with 25,000 in attendance. The company later expanded into a record label.

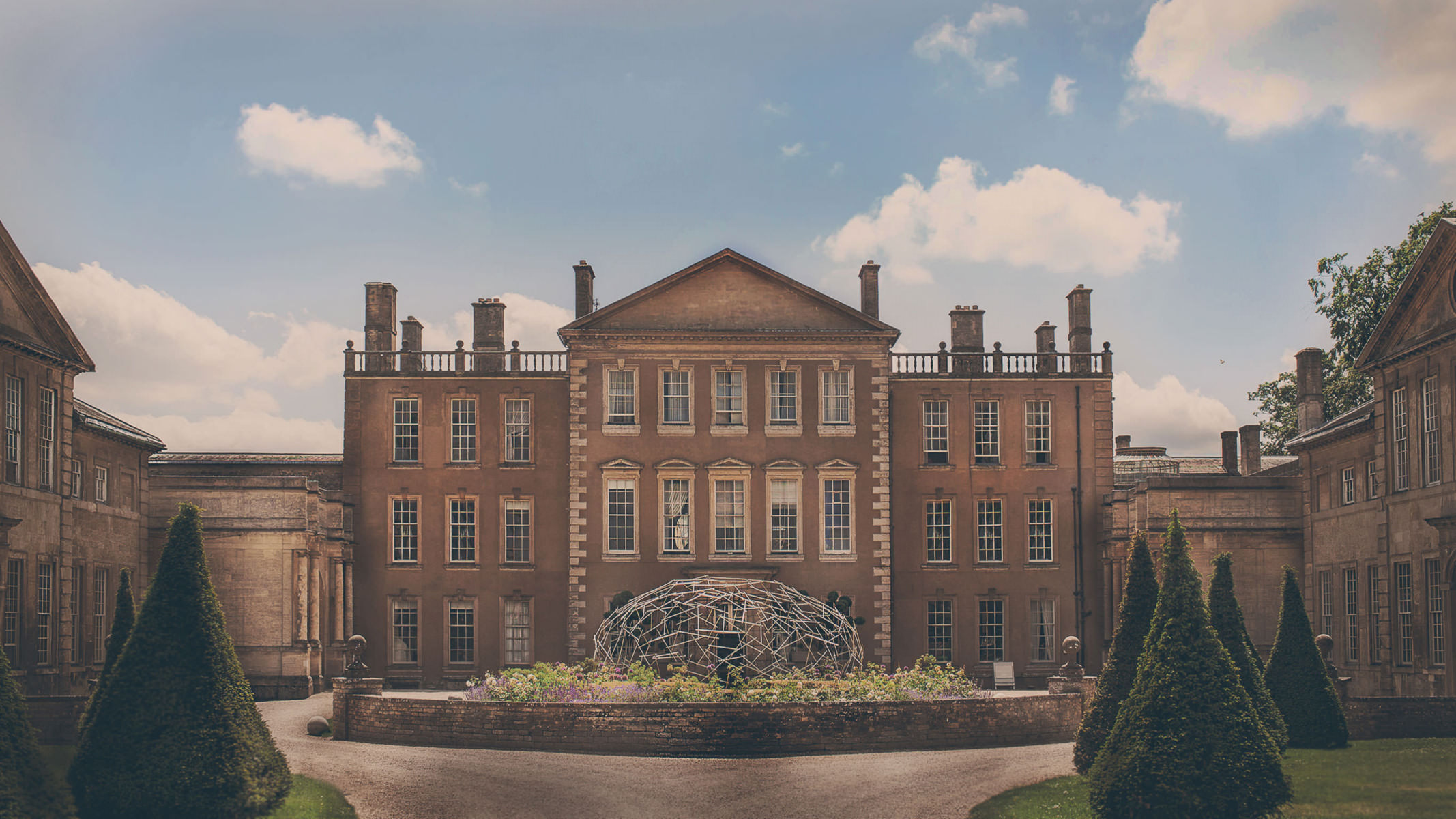
Aynhoe Park

Perkins then became a property developer. He engaged in renovation works on historic buildings such as Dowdeswell Court near Cheltenham, Howsham Hall in north Yorkshire, Gosfield Hall near Braintree, Essex and the Round Tower in Cirencester. In 2006, he bought Aynhoe Park, which he turned into a party and events venue. Perkins decorated the house with sculptures and artworks, unusual objects and curiosities, including his collections of taxidermy and plaster casts (he holds one of the largest private collection of plaster casts in the world), and it became a noted wedding and party venue for celebrities. He started the "A Modern Grand Tour" brand, which offers his collections, furniture and various objects for sale, including his own artwork.

He bought the fire-damaged Parnham Park in Dorset in 2020, where he now lives. The house is being restored and has been open to the public since 2021.

== Personal life ==
He is married to Sophie, and they have three children.
