= Parnham House =

Grade I listed house in Dorset

Coordinates: 50.7987858°N 2.742879°W

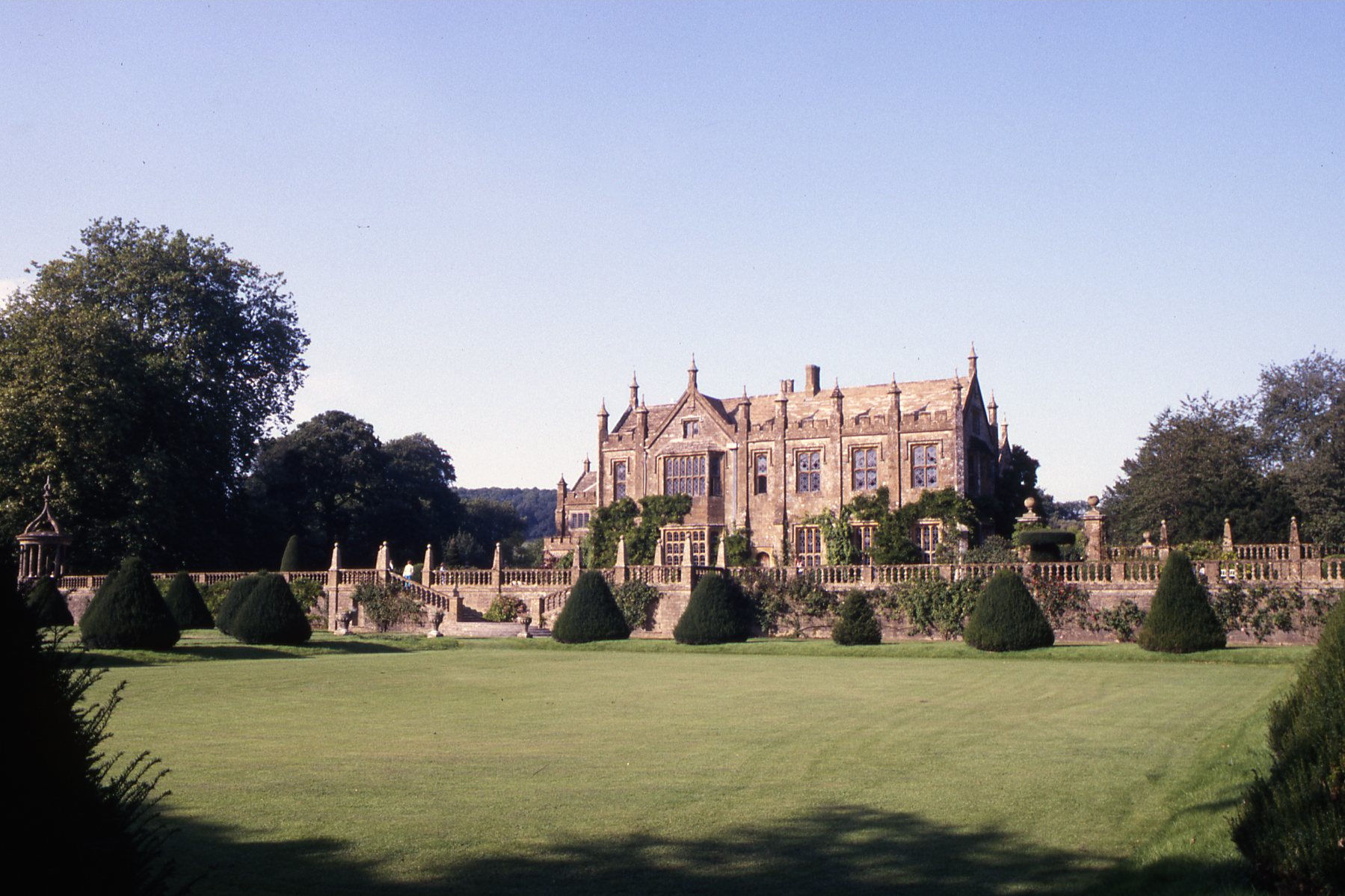
- Parnham House in 1988, before fire damage

- Location within Dorset
- Type: Stately home

History
- Built: 1552 (original); 1810 (renovation)

Site notes
- Architect: John Nash
- Website: parnhampark.co.uk

Listed Building – Grade I
- Official name: Parnham House
- Designated: 12 June 1953
- Reference no.: 1221178

Parnham House is a sixteenth-century Grade I listed house located in Parnham Park about 1 mile (1.6 km) from Beaminster in Dorset, England. Historic England describes the house as "exceptionally important". In April 2017 the house was badly damaged by fire.

== History ==
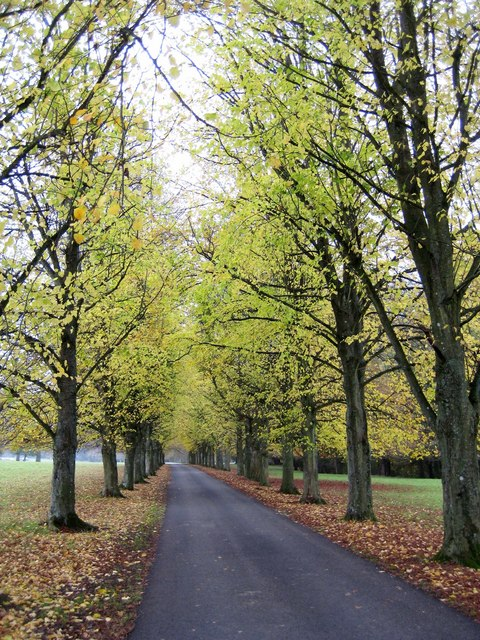
The drive leading up to Parnham House.

The original house on the site was built in the 1400s and completely rebuilt in 1552 for Robert Strode and his wife, Elizabeth Gerad. It is one of Dorset's oldest stately homes, and the 16th-century hall and kitchen wing remained until 2017. The house covers an area of 37,000 square feet (0.85 acres). The house belonged to the Strodes for more than 200 years. During the English Civil War Sir John Strode's widow, Lady Ann Strode, mother of junior Lord John Strode, was killed while trying to protect the house from Roundheads under the authority of Thomas Fairfax. In 1810 the house was remodelled by John Nash. His renovations included winding staircases and stone-mullioned windows.

After his death in the Royal Flying Corps during the 1915 Second Battle of Ypres William Barnard Rhodes-Moorhouse was buried in the grounds of Parnham House, the house he and his wife had bought just a few years previously to be their family home. Rhodes-Moorhouse was the first airman to receive the Victoria Cross. His son, William Henry Rhodes-Moorhouse, a pilot in the Royal Air Force, was killed in the Battle of Britain and is buried near his father.

In the 1920s the house was used as a country club and it was used by the American army during the Second World War.

After the War the house was used as a country club and nursing home. The house was purchased by John Makepeace for £90,000 in 1976, and he used it for his School for Craftsmanship in Wood, which focused on teaching woodworking and business skills. Fred Baier was a teacher at the school. The grounds at the southern end of the house were landscaped in 1978 under a job creation scheme, to mark a visit to the school by the Duke of Edinburgh. In 2001 Makepeace sold the house to an Austrian hedge fund manager.

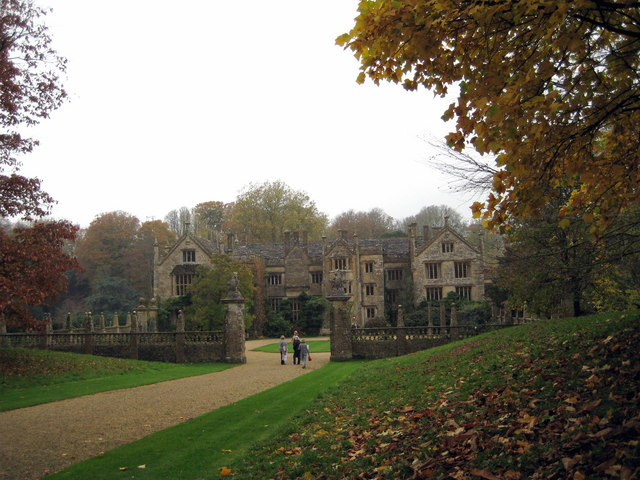
Entrance to Parnham House in 2008

The house became a Grade I listed building on the National Heritage List for England in 1953. Its gardens were landscaped by Inigo Thomas, and were Grade II* listed on the Register of Historic Parks and Gardens in 1986. In addition to the main house, the lodge, ice house, and kitchen garden walls are Grade II listed, and the front courtyard, south terrace walls and gazebos, and stable block are listed Grade II*. The house has been used as the venue for the annual Eat Dorset Food Fair.

In April 2017 the house was badly damaged by fire, the cause of which is still undetermined. The entire interior and contents were lost. The house's owner, Michael Treichl, was arrested on suspicion of arson. In June 2017 Treichl was found dead in Switzerland, and the police investigation was concluded in October 2017 with no other suspects. In 2018 Historic England said that the house was "at risk of collapse". In 2018 the house was put up for sale for £3 million.

The house was sold in 2020 for £2.5 million to James Perkins to be developed as "a base for 'adventure' stays and visits". In September 2021, the house was given an events licence. The money raised was expected to be used towards the house's renovation, which is estimated to cost around £40 million. On 5 August 2022, plans for the site's restoration were approved by the authorities.

== In popular culture ==
Parnham House was used for an episode of The Goodies which features a giant version of the character Dougal from The Magic Roundabout.

== See also ==
- Grade I listed buildings in Dorset
