= Raindance (rave music promoter) =

British rave event organisers

Coordinates: 51°31′22″N 0°4′41″E

- Genre: Rave music; breakbeat hardcore; happy hardcore; jungle
- Locations: London, United Kingdom
- Years active: 1989–present
- Website: raindancerave.org

Raindance are a British rave music promoter. They were one of the best known rave organisers in the late 1980s and early 1990s.

== History ==
The first Raindance event was held at a circus tent on 16 September 1989 at Jenkins Lane, Beckton in east London. It was organised by Paul Nelson (brother of DJ Slipmatt), Lou Lewis, and Ray Spence, with the sound system supplied by Paul Raindance who continues to promote the parties to this day. DJs including Slipmatt, Carl Cox, LTJ Bukem, Mr C, and John Digweed are all said to have had their careers promoted by Raindance. Raindance has also hosted acts such as Shades of Rhythm, N-Joi and The Prodigy.

Raindance organised parties across the UK between 1989 and 1993, however by 1993 the breakbeat hardcore music scene began to split, and pressure from the authorities leading upto the Criminal Justice Act led Raindance to take a break from holding large events. In 1995, Raindance returned with an event at Bagley's in King's Cross and events at venues such as the Pleasure Rooms, the Sanctuary, The Rocket, and Camden Palace.

In 1999, Raindance started to host raves at The Drome, an unused car park underneath London Bridge railway station, which became the club seOne. This would become Raindance's new home for ten years with multiple rooms catering for breakbeat hardcore, jungle, happy hardcore, and classic acid house/house music.

In recent years, Raindance has held regular events at Heaven and Fabric.

== See also ==
- List of electronic music festivals
- Sunrise & Back to the Future
