= XL Recordings =

British record label

- Industry: Music & Entertainment
- Genre: Various
- Founded: 1989; 37 years ago
- Founder: Tim Palmer, Nick Halkes
- Headquarters: London, England, United Kingdom; New York, United States (satellite)
- Key people: Richard Russell (CEO)
- Parent: Beggars Group
- Website: xlrecordings.com

XL Recordings is a British independent record label founded in 1989 by Tim Palmer and Nick Halkes. It has been run and co-owned by Richard Russell since 1996. It forms part of the Beggars Group.

It releases an average of six albums a year. The label releases albums worldwide and operates across a range of genres.

== History ==
=== 1980s and 1990s ===
Originally launched in 1989 to release rave and dance music, the label began as an imprint of Beggars Banquet's more commercial dance label Citybeat, which was known for records by acts such as Freeez, Rob Base & EZ Rock, Starlight, Dream Frequency and the Ultramagnetic MCs. However, with the success of acts such as the Prodigy and SL2, XL superseded Citybeat in its lineup.

During the early 1990s, XL releases were dance-oriented, ranging from Belgian techno (T99's "Anasthasia") to breakbeat hardcore (SL2's "On a Ragga Tip") to drum and bass (Jonny L's "I'm Leavin'"). This period of XL's history has been recorded on the XL Recordings Chapters compilation series. In 1993, Halkes left XL to form the EMI-owned commercial dance label Positiva, and subsequently his own independent commercial dance label Incentive. After Palmer retired in 1996, Russell took over the business.

Russell later broadened the label's musical horizons, whilst maintaining a credo of working with artists he saw as original and inventive. In 1994, the label released the Prodigy's second album, Music for the Jilted Generation which debuted atop the UK Albums Chart, and in 1997 it released the group's third album, The Fat of the Land which entered atop the British and American charts and went on to be number one in 26 countries.

=== 2000s ===
In June 2000, Badly Drawn Boy's released The Hour of Bewilderbeast, which won the 2000 Mercury Music Prize. LemonJelly.ky was also released and received critical acclaim. The next year, the White Stripes' third album White Blood Cells was released together with reissues of the band's previous albums, The White Stripes and De Stijl. In 2003, XL Recordings won the Music Week A&R award, and also released the White Stripes' fourth album Elephant which was their first UK number one album and eventually reached double platinum certification in Britain. That same year, XL released Dizzee Rascal's first solo album, Boy in da Corner for which Dizzee was awarded the Mercury Prize for the best album of 2003.

In March 2005, M.I.A.'s debut album Arular was released after several months' delay. Thom Yorke, from Radiohead, released his first solo record, The Eraser, on the label in July 2006. In October 2007, Radiohead completed negotiations to sign with XL for physical release of their seventh studio album, In Rainbows. Radiohead subsequently went on to release through XL, and have so far released everything since their eighth studio album The King of Limbs on the label. As director of XL Recordings, Richard Russell was included in a 2007 Evening Standard list of the most influential people in London, and in August of that year M.I.A.'s second album Kala was released—Rolling Stone named it the ninth best album of the decade.

In March 2008, XL added Friendly Fires and the Horrors. In 2009, the label won the "Music Week" Best Independent Label award; Adele won the awards for Best New Artist and Best Female Pop Vocal Performance at the 51st Annual Grammy Awards, and at the same ceremony Radiohead won Best Alternative Album for In Rainbows as well as Best Boxed or Special Edition Album. Also in 2009, the xx's debut album xx was released on XL Recordings partner label Young, and in September, Giggs was signed.

=== 2010s ===
On 11 January 2010, XL Recordings released Vampire Weekend's second album Contra, the band's first album to top the US Billboard 200 chart. Gil Scott-Heron's thirteenth studio album I'm New Here was released in February; it was Scott-Heron's first release of original material in sixteen years and would ultimately be his last studio album before his death the following May. Recording sessions for the album took place between 2007 and 2009 and production was handled by XL Recordings-owner Richard Russell.

In July, XL signed Jai Paul, who was shortlisted for BBC's Sound of 2011, and in September the xx's eponymous debut album won the Barclaycard Mercury Prize, acquiring best British and Irish album of the year.

On 24 January 2011, XL Recordings released the album 21 by Adele. In February the (then) 19-year-old OFWGKTA member Tyler, the Creator was signed for a one-album deal for his debut studio album and commercial debut Goblin. Singer Gil Scott-Heron died in May and his final recordings, I'm New Here (produced by Richard Russell), and the remix album, We're New Here made with Jamie xx were released on XL Recordings. The label also released new albums by Radiohead, Friendly Fires, and the Horrors and singles by Jai Paul and Portishead, as well as the Adele Blu-ray/DVD, Live at the Royal Albert Hall.

On 24 April 2012, XL released Blunderbuss, the debut solo record by Jack White. It entered the UK album charts at number one, displacing 21 by Adele. In 2012, XL Recordings was named 'Label of the Year' at the Music Week Awards in London. XL also won awards for 'Best A&R' and 'Best Artist Campaign'. Label head, Richard Russell, became the youngest ever recipient of the lifetime achievement 'Strat Award'.

Sales of Adele's 21 helped increase XL Recordings' bank balance from £3 million to £32 million over 12 months. As of March 2011, XL Recordings had released three albums that had sold over a million copies in the UK: The Prodigy's The Fat of the Land, Adele's 19, and Adele's 21.

In April 2016, Radiohead's Parlophone albums transferred to XL Recordings. A month later, on 8 May, the band released their ninth studio album, A Moon Shaped Pool, through XL to critical acclaim.

== XL Studio ==
In early 2008, Russell transformed the rear garage of the label's Ladbroke Grove headquarters into a small, in-house recording and mixing studio called XL Studio. It served as a makeshift studio space for the label's various artists and his own projects until producer Rodaidh McDonald was assigned in September of that year to manage and properly equip it in preparation for The xx to record their self-titled debut album. According to McDonald, "before Richard brought me in to be Studio Manager, it was just a bit of a free-for-all. Artists could come in and rehearse, demo or write here and things like that ... but it was good idea and we decided we should be stepping it up and making records here." Russell and McDonald were inspired by the success of modest studios such as Hitsville U.S.A. and wanted to create an economic, non-commercial space.

Set up specifically with The xx in mind, XL Studio features little outboard gear and is equipped with a Neotek Élan custom 24-channel mixing console, Yamaha NS10 studio monitors, and instruments that include an upright piano, Roland Juno-60, Moog Prodigy, Vox Continental organ, and Sequential Circuits Pro-One synthesizer. Russell and McDonald augmented the studio to twice its original size after The xx's album, which was done in what became the studio's control room; they incorporated an adjacent office as the studio's live room for musicians.

In 2016, Walters-Storyk Design Group (WSDG) completed the construction of a new recording studio in the basement of the XL Recordings offices in New York City.

== Roster ==
=== XL Recordings ===
As of 2026, XL Recordings is home to a range of artists including:

- Arca
- BadBadNotGood
- Blawan
- Burial
- CASISDEAD
- Charlotte Day Wilson
- Danny L Harle
- DJ Python
- Everything Is Recorded / Richard Russell
- Fontaines D.C.
- Ibeyi
- Jim Legxacy
- Joy Orbison
- Kenny Beats
- King Krule / Archy Marshall
- Makaya McCraven
- Overmono
- Nourished by Time
- Jai Paul
- KeiyaA
- Peggy Gou
- Jack Peñate
- Radiohead
- Ratatat
- Rostam
- Sigur Rós
- Smerz
- Special Request
- The Smile
- Standing on the Corner
- Thom Yorke
- Yaeji
- 300SkullsAndCounting
- Jenny Sparks

=== XL Recordings alumni ===
- Adele
- Atoms for Peace
- Azealia Banks
- The Avalanches
- Basement Jaxx
- Badly Drawn Boy
- Be Your Own Pet
- Beck
- Bobby Womack
- Blue Roses / Laura Groves
- Capitol K
- Dizzee Rascal
- Discovery
- East India Youth
- Electric Six
- Eyedress
- Fontaines DC
- Friendly Fires
- Giggs
- Gil Scott-Heron
- Golden Silvers
- Gotan Project
- Holly Miranda
- The Horrors
- House of Pain
- Iceage
- Jack White
- Jungle
- Karen Elson
- Kaytranada
- Kirin J Callinan
- Kwes
- Leila
- Lemon Jelly
- Liquid
- Magistrates
- M.I.A.
- Monsta Boy
- Nines
- Novelist
- Nu-Birth
- Peaches
- Ratking
- The Prodigy
- QT
- RJD2
- Roy Davis Jr. feat. Peven Everett
- Shamir
- SL2
- Super Furry Animals
- Sunless '97
- The Cool Kids
- Theoretical Girl
- Titus Andronicus
- The Streets
- Tyler, the Creator
- Various Production
- Vampire Weekend
- The White Stripes
- Wiki
- Wiley
- Willis Earl Beal
- Zomby
- Zongamin

=== Young roster ===
- Daniela Lalita
- Ethan P. Flynn
- FKA twigs
- Jamie xx
- John Glacier
- John Talabot
- Kamasi Washington
- Koreless
- Mechatok
- Oliver Sim
- Romy
- Sampha
- The xx
- Treanne

=== Paul Institute ===
- A. K. Paul
- Fabiana Palladino
- HIRA
- Pen Pals
- REINEN
- Ruthven
- Prince85

== See also ==
=== Affiliated labels/imprints ===
- Paul Institute
- Young

=== Formerly affiliated labels/imprints ===
- Kaya Kaya Records
- Terrible
- Locked On

=== Inactive affiliated labels/imprints ===
- Abeano
- Concept In Dance
- HXC Recordings
- Merok Records
- New Gen
- Ore Music
- Platinum Projects
- Rex Records
- Salvia

=== Other ===
- List of electronic music record labels
- List of independent UK record labels
- List of record labels
