= The Bouncer (song) =

Single by Kicks Like a Mule
- Released: 1992
- Genre: Breakbeat hardcore
- Label: Tribal Bass Records
- Songwriter(s): Nick Halkes, Richard Russell
- Producer(s): Nick Halkes, Richard Russell

Kicks Like a Mule singles chronology
| "The Bouncer" (1992) | "Number One" (1992) |

"The Bouncer" is a song by British electronic dance music duo Kicks Like a Mule. It was released as a single in 1992, and was a success, peaking at No. 7 on the UK Singles Chart. It features vocal samples of an archetypal club bouncer saying "Your name's not down, you're not coming in", "Not tonight, you're not on the list" and "Listen mate, I told you once, I told you twice, you're not on the list, alright?".

A keyboard riff sample is taken from the 1990 song "Moribund" by Frank De Wulf. In 2006, English indie rock band Klaxons covered "The Bouncer" for their Xan Valleys EP. Kicks Like a Mule returned the favour the following year by covering Klaxon's "Gravity's Rainbow". In 2008, English electronic musician Zomby sampled the vocal sample "your name's not down, you're not coming in" in the song "Hench" from his album Where Were U in '92?. The vocal samples also appear on the track "UK Border Patrol" from the album Organ by an English EDM musician Dimension, and the song "Movin' On Up (Coco's Song, Love Beats Rhymes)" by American rapper Azealia Banks.

== Track listing ==
UK 12" single
A. "The Bouncer" (Original Mix)
B1. "The Bouncer" (Housequake Mix)
B2. "The Bouncer" (Raw Mix)
