= Slipmatt =

British electronic music producer and DJ

- Born: Matthew Nelson; 22 April 1967 (age 59); Loughton, Essex, England
- Genres: House breakbeat hardcore
- Years active: 1988–present

Matthew Nelson (born 22 April 1967 in Loughton, Essex, England), better known as DJ Slipmatt, is a British electronic music producer and DJ. He was one half of breakbeat hardcore group SL2, who had a 1992 UK hit with "On a Ragga Tip".

== Biography ==
In 1988, while working as an electrician and courier, Nelson obtained his first turntables and started playing hip-hop and house. He then founded a pirate radio station named "Raw FM" in London's East End, and in 1989 began his professional DJ career as DJ for the Raindance rave event. His first music production was in 1989 where Slipmatt collaborated with DJ Lime forming SL2. The single, "Do That Dance", was released in that same year. This was followed by the number 11 UK chart hit "DJs Take Control" / "Way in My Brain". The follow-up single, "On a Ragga Tip", reached number 2 on the UK Singles Chart in April 1992. As a result of their chart success, the band were propelled into the media spotlight and made appearances on Top of the Pops and other television shows. SL2's chart success continued with a remix of "Way in My Brain", which made the top twenty in the UK chart.

Amidst the chart success, Slipmatt cemented his name on the rave DJ circuit and was a regular at major Fantazia and Dreamscape events. In 1993, Nelson set up a new project, the SMD series (Slip Matt's Dubs). The first release, SMD#1, sold over 10,000 copies, with a further three instalments following in the series. A compilation album collected these recordings.

1994 saw the release of "Breaking Free" and "Hear Me" on Slipmatt and Lime's own Awesome Records imprint, the former being embraced by jungle and rave DJs alike. The tracks were later remixed by DJ SS (Formation Records) and DJ Seduction (Impact Records) respectively. By 1995, Slipmatt's DJ sets had veered strongly towards the tougher hardcore genre and Nelson set up Universal Records to represent this burgeoning style. Releases from Force & Styles (as A Sense of Summer), DJ Sy & Unknown, DJ Demo and others followed. The tracks "Breaking Free" and "Hear Me" were again remixed, this time by Ramos & Sunset Regime.

As Slipmatt, he has compiled and mixed several albums, including United Dance Anthems 1 & 2 and Moondance True Rave Anthems. Slipmatt's remixes include many remixes for Ministry of Sound and various well known and established record labels.

Since 1994, Nelson presented his own radio shows on Kiss 100 as well as numerous other stations over the years. Nelson has played in the US, Australia, Thailand, and around Europe. He has DJ'd at Ibiza's Space, Es Paradise, Eden, Summum, and most of the San Antonio West End clubs.

In 2003, Slipmatt's track, "Space", peaked at #41 on the UK Singles Chart.

Slipmatt has DJ'd at Fantazia, Raindance, Moondance, Dreamscape, Pleasuredome, Hardcore Heaven, Dance Concept, Helter Skelter, One Nation, United Dance, Uprising, Dizstruxshon, Alderney Bunker Parties, World Dance, Slammin Vinyl, Glastonbury, Bestival, O2 London & thousands of raves over the years.
