= Tom McKinney (broadcaster) =

British broadcaster and musician

- Born: 1979 (age 46–47)
- Education: Royal Northern College of Music; University of Manchester
- Occupations: Radio presenter; Guitarist

Tom McKinney (born 1979) is a British broadcaster and musician, who presents Breakfast, the weekday breakfast programme, on BBC Radio 3, and in addition is involved with musical concerts and performances.

== Early life and education ==
McKinney was born and raised in Stoke-on-Trent. His parents had strong interests in music, with his mother being a very avid fan of the music of Black Sabbath and his father being part of a punk rock band.

He holds an undergraduate degree from the Royal Northern College of Music in Manchester, where he studied classical guitar under Craig Ogden. He then studied Musicology at postgraduate level at the University of Manchester.

== Musical career ==
McKinney became a professional classical guitarist after finishing university. He has been involved in the very first performances of music by Louis Andriessen, Julia Wolfe and other composers.

In 2010, McKinney featured in The Last Time I Died, an album composed by Ailís Ní Ríain.

McKinney is President of the Penkhull Festival; he was born in Penkhull.

McKinney teaches at the Royal Northern College of Music, where he was once a student. He is Professor of Guitar at the RNCM, where he gives one-to-one tuition to students. He has performed in Germany and Belgium as a musician, as well as at locations across the UK. He has also performed at the BBC Proms and in 2019 was particularly popular in terms of his performance of new music.

He organises the Sheffield Crucible Theatre's Music in the Round's chamber music concerts. He hosted the Royal Philharmonic Society Awards 2025. As of 2019, he was an audition consultant at the organisation Live Music Now!

== Broadcasting career ==
In 2012 McKinney's presenting for BBC Radio 3 largely consisted of live concerts, but from 2013 he began presenting Breakfast occasionally. He began presenting Hear and Now on the station in 2015. In 2017 he presented a number of different programmes on the station, including the weekday programme Afternoon Concert. In 2018 he was a not infrequent presenter of Afternoon Concert. In the 2010s he was also a reviewer of new releases on the station's Record Review programme. From 2019 McKinney presented very frequently on BBC Radio 3, particularly on Afternoon Concert. In 2022, McKinney was the only man from the north of England presenting on BBC Radio 3.

In 2024 he was announced as one of the presenters of Classical Live, the new weekday afternoon programme on BBC Radio 3 presented and produced in Salford. In that year, he was one of the most popular presenters at BBC Radio 3.

He now presents Breakfast on weekdays from the BBC's Salford studios in MediaCity UK; the location was new to the programme. He moved to weekdays on Breakfast from the Sunday Breakfast slot in late 2024 or early 2025 and was replaced on Sunday Breakfast by Mark Forrest.

== Personal life ==
McKinney is an avid fan of birds and his love of birds led to him starting to appear on BBC Radio 3.

As of April 2025, McKinney lived in Glossop, Derbyshire.
