= Lennie De Ice =

British musician (1970–2024)

- Also known as: Body Snatcher; Lick Down Crew
- Born: Lenworth Green; 14 May 1970; East London, England
- Died: 10 December 2024 (aged 54)
- Genres: Breakbeat hardcore; jungle
- Labels: Reel 2 Reel Productions; I.E.; Armshouse Crew
- Formerly of: CIS Production; Dub Hustlers; Madd-Ice

Lenworth Green (May 14, 1970 – December 10, 2024), better known as Lennie De Ice, was a British musician credited with pioneering jungle music with his 1991 track, "We Are I.E." His other aliases include Body Snatcher and Lick Down Crew. De Ice was a member of music groups CIS Production, Dub Hustlers and Madd-Ice.

== Early life and education ==
Born in East London in 1970, Green attended school in Walthamstow and was inspired by hip-hop and electro groups Mantronix, Jonzun Crew and rapper Afrika Bambaataa.

== Music career ==
In 1987, he began DJing rare groove and hip-hop with friend DJ ET, however, it was at the club The Dungeons on Lea Bridge Road, East London, where Green was introduced to acid house after attending a rave on Carpenters Road in Stratford. Green was particularly inspired by British musician A Guy Called Gerald after hearing him play at The Dungeons.

Green first began making the beats for "We Are I.E." in December 1988. "We Are I.E." first became popular through the influence of British drum & bass selector DJ Randall who loved the tune and premiered the dubplate (playing it twice) at a Living Dream rave at Eastway Cycle track, Leyton. "We Are I.E." was part of a four-track EP from label Reel 2 Reel Productions that originated from De Underground Records of Forest Gate, East London. It was De Underground's Desmond Fearon (who produced as Uncle 22) who showed Green how to use Cubase audio sequencing software.

He also ran his own labels, Armshouse Crew and Do or Die.

Green died in December 2024, at the age of 54.

== Discography ==
- "We Are I.E." (I.e. Records, 1991)
- "Count the Action EP" (Armshouse Crew, 1993)
- "Carnival 93" (with Timmi Magic) (Armshouse Crew, 1993)
- "Well Terrible" (Do or Die, 1994)
