= SL2 (musical group) =

English musical group

- Also known as: Slipmatt & Lime, THC
- Origin: London, England
- Genres: Breakbeat hardcore
- Years active: 1985–1993, 1998–present
- Labels: XL Recordings, American Recordings, B-Ware
- Members: Matt "Slipmatt" Nelson; John "Lime" Fernandez; Jay-J (vocals, rap)
- Past members: Jo Millet; Kelly Overett; Devious D Ronan Fitzgerald

SL2 is an English breakbeat hardcore group from London, England. They also recorded, remixed or produced under the names Slipmatt & Lime and T.H.C.

== Background ==
Starting out as a group of three, SL2 was originally a coming together of DJs Matt "Slipmatt" Nelson and John "Lime" Fernandez, and rap vocalist Jason "Jay-J" James. The SL2 name came from the founders' initials: Slipmatt (S) and Lime (L), and the fact that they were a duo, hence "SL2".

=== Underground ===
As youngsters in 1980s Britain, they were into hip-hop, before having their heads turned by the growing rave scene.

Their big break came in 1989 through Slipmatt's older brother, Paul Nelson, who was running the party-promoting organisation Raindance; they became the enterprise's resident DJs, playing parties all over the United Kingdom.

A year into touring with Raindance, SL2 released their debut single, "Do That Dance", through B-Ware Records. Subsequently, SL2 set up their own Awesome Records label, through which they first released another single, "DJs Take Control". The record sold 3500 copies, attracting the attention of new dance label XL Recordings.

=== Mainstream ===
XL Recordings catapulted SL2 into the mainstream charts by re-releasing "DJs Take Control" which became a number 11 hit in the UK Singles Chart. More success followed accompanied by two female rave/breakbeat dancers, Jo Millett (who later produced her own music) and Kelly Overett (who would later go on to be a member of the Italian Eurodance act Cappella). The latter two appeared with Nelson, Fernandez and James in live shows and their videos.

"On a Ragga Tip" was released in 1992 through XL Recordings, and became their biggest hit to date, spending 11 weeks in the UK chart. It peaked at number two, and was their first song to chart across Europe. With the new hit "Way in My Brain" charting later that year, disagreements within the group saw SL2 split up by the end of 1993.The outfit sampled the bassline and vocal refrain for their track "Way in My Brain" from Wayne Smith (musician)’s breakthrough digital reggae discomix tune, Sleng Teng.

=== Reformation ===
In 1997, a remix of their biggest hit, "On a Ragga Tip" re-entered the chart, leading Slipmatt and Lime to reconvene. Although no new material was ever released, they still continue to DJ on a semi-regular basis. "On a Ragga Tip", was used in the opening ceremony, of the 2014 Commonwealth Games.

On 21 July 2015, The SL2 EP was released containing digitally remastered recordings of "On a Ragga Tip", "Way in My Brain", "DJs Take Control" and "The Noise".

== Cover versions ==
South African band Dr Victor and the Rasta Rebels covered "On a Ragga Tip".

In 2015, the British electronic/house duo, My Digital Enemy, released an EDM remake of "On a Ragga Tip" which sampled the SL2 original version.

== Discography ==
=== Singles and EPs ===
Year	Single	Peak chart positions			
Year	Single	UK	BEL	IRE	NED
1989	"Do That Dance"/"It Ain't Nothing"	—	—	—	—
1991	"The Noise"/"Bassquake"	—	—	—	—
1991	"DJs Take Control"/"Way in My Brain"	11	—	—	—
1992	"On a Ragga Tip"	2	42	3	2
1992	"Way in My Brain (Remix)"/"Drumbeats"	26	—	23	27
1997	"On a Ragga Tip '97 (Remix)"	31	—	—	—
2003	On a Ragga Tip (EP)	97	—	—	—
2015	The SL2 EP	—	—	—	—
