= On a Ragga Tip =

1992 single by SL2

Single by SL2
- Released: 6 April 1992
- Genre: Breakbeat hardcore
- Length: 5:11
- Label: XL
- Songwriters: Matthew "Slipmatt" Nelson; John "Lime" Fernandez
- Producers: Matthew "Slipmatt" Nelson; John "Lime" Fernandez

SL2 singles chronology
"DJ's Take Control" / "Way in My Brain" (1991)	"On a Ragga Tip" (1992)	"Way in My Brain" (remix)/ "Drumbeats" (1992)

"On a Ragga Tip" is a song by British breakbeat hardcore group SL2, released as a single in April 1992. The song contains samples of Jah Screechy's "Walk and Skank" and Kid 'n Play's "Gittin' Funky (UK Remix)".

The song was a success, peaking at No. 2 in the United Kingdom and the Netherlands, No. 3 in Ireland and No. 42 in Belgium. It remains the group's biggest and best-known song. In 1997, a remix of the song was released and reached No. 31 in the UK.

In 2015, the original SL2 version was used in a McDonald's television commercial in the UK, and in 2019, it was used in a Virgin Media commercial

== Critical reception ==
Andy Beevers from Music Week named "On A Ragga Tip" Pick of the Week in the category of Dance, stating that "this track continues the reggae-hardcore theme of 'Way in My Brain', the hugely popular flipside to their massive 'DJs Take Control' hit. Built around Jah Screechy's extremely catchy 'Walk and Skank', 'On a Ragga Tip' is destined for great things."

== Track listing ==
- UK 12-inch single

A1. "On a Ragga Tip" (original mix) – 5:11
A2. "Pleasure" (original mix) – 4:05
AA1. "Changing Trax" (original mix) – 5:00
AA2. "Bassquake" (Plus 8 Mix) – 4:26

== Charts ==
=== Weekly charts ===
Chart (1992)	Peak position
Belgium (Ultratop 50 Flanders)	42
Europe (Eurochart Hot 100)	6
Europe (European Dance Radio)	8
Ireland (IRMA)	3
Netherlands (Dutch Top 40)	3
Netherlands (Single Top 100)	2
UK Singles (OCC)	2
UK Dance (Music Week)	1
UK Club Chart (Music Week)	11

Chart (1997)	Peak position
Europe (Eurochart Hot 100)	48
Scotland Singles (OCC)	36
UK Singles (OCC)	31
UK Dance (OCC)	2

=== Year-end charts ===
Chart (1992)	Position
Europe (Eurochart Hot 100)	92
Netherlands (Dutch Top 40)	17
Netherlands (Single Top 100)	16
UK Singles (OCC)	20

== Certifications ==
Region	Certification	Certified units/sales
United Kingdom (BPI)	Silver	200,000^{^}
^{^} Shipments figures based on certification alone.

== Other versions and sampling ==
In 1992, South African singer Dr Victor interpolated the vocals and hook of "On a Ragga Tip", with added verses and instrumentation, in the song "Badayo".

In 1994, Bali Brahmbhatt and Alka Yagnik interpolated the song in "Amma Dekh Tera Munda" from the Bollywood film Stuntman.

In 2015, British electronic/house duo My Digital Enemy released an EDM remake of "On a Ragga Tip" which sampled the original SL2 version.
