= We Are I.E. =

Single by Lennie De Ice
- Released: 1991
- Recorded: 1989
- Genre: Breakbeat hardcore; jungle
- Length: 7:41
- Label: Reel 2 Reel Productions, I.E. Records
- Songwriter: Lenworth Green
- Producer: Lenworth Green

"We Are I.E." is a song by British breakbeat hardcore producer Lennie De Ice. It was first recorded in 1989, but not released until 1991 when it appeared on a four-track EP from Reel 2 Reel Productions, one of a number of labels (and associated artists) that originated from the De Underground record shop based in Forest Gate, East London. It is often credited as one of, if not the first, tracks to lay down the foundations for jungle music.

The track contains several samples, the most prominent being the Amen break and the vocal "We are i.e." from the Algerian song "N'Sel Fik" by Chaba Fadela and Cheb Sahraoui, as well as the "let me hear you scream" vocal from "The Bugger Groove" by the Buggers, a backspin sound from Simon Harris's "Beats, Breaks & Scratches", the riff from 808 State's "Fire Cracker", and finally a Western-style gunshot sound.

The track has had a number of remixes and revivals, with subsequent jungle remixes released in 1993 and 1994, and the track being increasingly played at 45 RPM (the original EP was mastered at 33 RPM) in later drum and bass and UK garage DJ sets. It inspired producers R.I.P. Productions to release a speed garage version in 1997 titled "The Chant (We R)". In 1999, Distinctive Records released new house and hard house remixes which reached No. 61 on the UK Singles Chart, No. 4 on the UK Dance Singles Chart and No. 12 on the UK Independent Singles Chart in April of that year. It was re-released again in 2022 by the British house music label Hooj Choons featuring new remixes including by Horsepower Productions).

== Impact and legacy ==
In a 2015 interview, drum and bass pioneer DJ Grooverider stated of the song: "We Are i.e." changed the game. After that, people started to talk about jungle".

Breakbeat hardcore duo 2 Bad Mice compiled a list of "the 10 best rave tracks" for Dummy Mag in 2016 including "We Are I.E.", saying: "A stone cold classic, and anybody that ever heard this dropping down at Rage would never forget it. Cited by many as the first ever jungle tune, and it's pretty hard to argue with that."

In a March 2017 article for The Vinyl Factory, artist Luca Lozano said of the track: "Whenever the birth of jungle is debated, usually some smart alec offers this track up as a starting point. Many people herald it as the first jungle track ever. Whether that is true or not is a matter for another discussion, but what we can talk about here is the relentless amen, the bleeps, the dubbed out "stepper" bass line and the incredibly suitable 'Lemme hear you scream' vocal sample."

DJ Billy 'Daniel' Bunter included "We Are I.E." in his 2018 list of "7 utterly crucial rave and hardcore classics", saying: "Another huge catalyst for jungle and hardcore. The simplicity of it – there's this reggae-esque bassline, very mid-'80s reggae, then there's this rattling Amen break, and then the chant: "We are IE". There are hardly any elements to it, but it makes up such an amazing record. Everyone would always save their main track for the A-side, but this was the second track on the B-side, not even the main feature. But it still became one of the most seminal records of the era."
