= Kicks Like a Mule =

British electronic music duo

Kicks Like a Mule is a British electronic music duo consisting of Richard Russell and Nick Halkes. Their first single, "The Bouncer", peaked at No. 7 in the UK Singles Chart when it was released in 1992. Although both Halkes and Russell worked at the XL Recordings label at the time of the single's release (XL being run by Russell to this day), it was released on Rebel MC’s independent Tribal Bass label. It featured a repeated vocal sample of an archetypal club bouncer saying "Your name's not down, you're not coming in" and "Not tonight, you're not on the list."

Kicks Like a Mule were also responsible for the remix of Awesome 3's "Don’t Go", and produced the song "Pass the Rizla" by London Posse which was featured on the London Underground EP on XL Records in 1993. This was also featured on the 2001 reissue of London Posse's album Gangster Chronicle. Their second single, "Number One" was also released on the Tribal Bass label.

As 'Lifelike', Russell and Halkes also recorded the song "Like Life", which was released on FFRR Records. Although this was meant to be the first fruits of an album project, the album never materialised.

In 2006, homage was paid to Kicks Like a Mule in the form of a cover of "The Bouncer" by Klaxons, with Kicks Like a Mule returning the favour by covering the Klaxon's "Gravity's Rainbow".

In 2008, live DJ sets at Epidemik, Bestival, Bangface and Break! followed with remixes of the likes of M.I.A. (featured on Kitsune Maison Vol. 5), Axwell, The Gossip, DJ Mehdi and more.

Most recently, under the revised artist name K.L.A.M., the act have both remixed and supported The Prodigy on part of their arena tour and also remixed Kid Sister for Fools Gold and DJed at Bestival in 2010.

== Discography ==
- 1992: "The Bouncer" - UK #7
- 1992: "Number One" (featuring Longsy D)
- 2007: "Gravity's Rainbow"
- 2010: Funky 4 EP
