= Fantazia (rave music promoter) =

Former live music promotion company

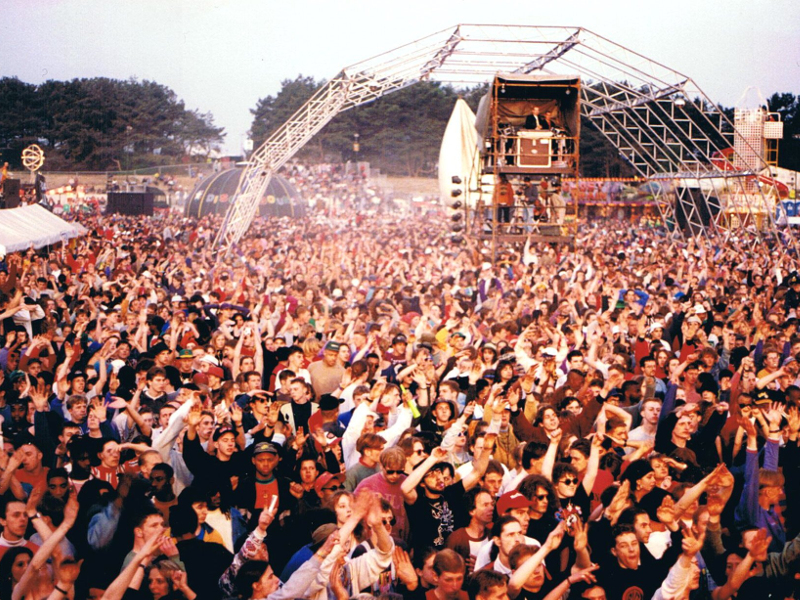
- Fantazia Summertime rave, May 1992
- Genre: Breakbeat hardcore; house music
- Years active: 1991-1997
- Founders: James Perkins; Gideon Dawson; Chris Griffin

Fantazia was a rave music promoter and organiser based in the United Kingdom. It was founded in 1991 by James Perkins, Gideon Dawson & Chris Griffin, and held a number of seminal raves at the height of the breakbeat hardcore scene in the early 1990s.

Fantazia first held a rave at Coventry's Eclipse nightclub, but would soon become best known for its large outdoor events.

- Fantazia New Year Eve (31 December 1991 – 1 January 1992) at Westpoint Exhibition Centre, near Exeter (10,000 people).
- Second Sight (21 - 22 February 1992) at Westpoint Centre, Exeter (8,000 people).
- Summertime (15 - 16 May 1992) at Matchams Park Stadium, Bournemouth (16,000 people).
- One Step Beyond (25 - 26 July 1992) at Donington Park (28,000 people).
- The Showcase (27 - 28 November 1992) at The Royal Bath & West Show ground, Shepton Mallet.
- Fantazia New Years Eve (31 December 1992 – 1 January 1993) at Littlecote House (near Hungerford, Berks) (16,000 people).
- Fantazia 2nd Birthday Celebration (23 April 1993) at The Sanctuary, Milton Keynes (6,000 people)
- The Big Bang (27 November 1993) at SECC Centre, Glasgow (12,000 people)

By 1993, Fantazia hosted club night tours across the UK. Its biggest event that year was The Big Bang at Glasgow's SECC Centre in November, which set a record at the time as the largest ever indoor rave.

In addition to raves, Fantazia also released a number of compilation albums, including "The First Taste" (1992), "Twice As Nice" (1993), and then moving into house compilations with the "House Collection" series (1994–1997).

In October 1997, Fantazia returned with Fantazia: The Return of a Legend, at the G-Mex in Manchester.

On 14 April 2019 Gideon Dawson was found dead in his Cheltenham home after suffering an overdose of cocaine and prescription drugs.

== See also ==
- List of electronic music festivals
- Dreamscape
- Breakbeat hardcore
