= The Eclipse (club) =

Nightclub in Coventry, England

Coordinates: 52.40978°N 1.50176°W

- Interactive map of The Eclipse
- Address: Lower Ford Street; Coventry; England
- Owner: Stuart Reid
- Capacity: 1,600

Construction
- Opened: October 1990
- Closed: February 1994 (as the Edge)

The Eclipse (later The Edge) was a nightclub in Coventry, England, and the first legal all-night club in the UK.

The Eclipse was a former Granada Bingo Hall, when local entrepreneurs Stuart Reid and Barry Edwards would put on the first allnighter in October 1990. The 1,600 capacity club was split over three floors.

The resident DJs were Mick Park and Mick Wilson (aka Parks & Wilson), The opening night line-up included: Evil Eddie Richards, Fabio, Sasha, and MC Tunes, who moaned about the sound system and walked off stage saying, "Get the sound sorted out, we'll be back soon", but he didn't return. It is said that the venue gave The Prodigy one of their first gigs for a fee of £60. The venue would also host nights from promoters such as Dance Planet and Amnesia House.

In April 1992 the club featured on the late-night ITV show The Hitman and Her.

In September 1992, the venue became The Edge. It finally closed in February 1994.

Virgin Records would release a two volume retrospective compilation The Eclipse Presents Dance 'Til Dawn in 1996 - one mixed by Stu Allan and the other Slipmatt.

After The Edge closed, the building was bought by Coventry University and repurposed as a student union entertainment venue and called The Planet. The building was eventually demolished to make way for a car park. The Eclipse was revived in 2025, launching a new website and merchendise. Along with selling T-Shirts and a poster showcasing a collection of flyers created to promote the club, The Eclipse also released remastered versions of the classic DJ Sets.

== See also ==
- List of electronic dance music venues
