= Breakbeat hardcore =

Subgenre of breakbeat and UK rave music

- Stylistic origins: Breakbeat; house; new beat; Belgian techno; acid house; hip-hop; hip house
- Cultural origins: Late 1980s – early 1990s, United Kingdom
- Derivative forms: Darkcore; jungle; drum and bass; 4-beat; happy hardcore; big beat

Breakbeat hardcore (also referred to as hardcore rave, oldskool hardcore or simply hardcore) is a music genre that spawned from the UK rave scene during the early 1990s. It combines four-on-the-floor rhythms with breakbeats usually sampled from hip-hop. In addition to the inclusion of breakbeats, the genre also features shuffled drum machine patterns, hoover, and other noises originating from new beat and Belgian techno, sounds from acid house and bleep techno, and often upbeat house piano riffs and vocals.

== History ==
=== Early 1990s: origins ===
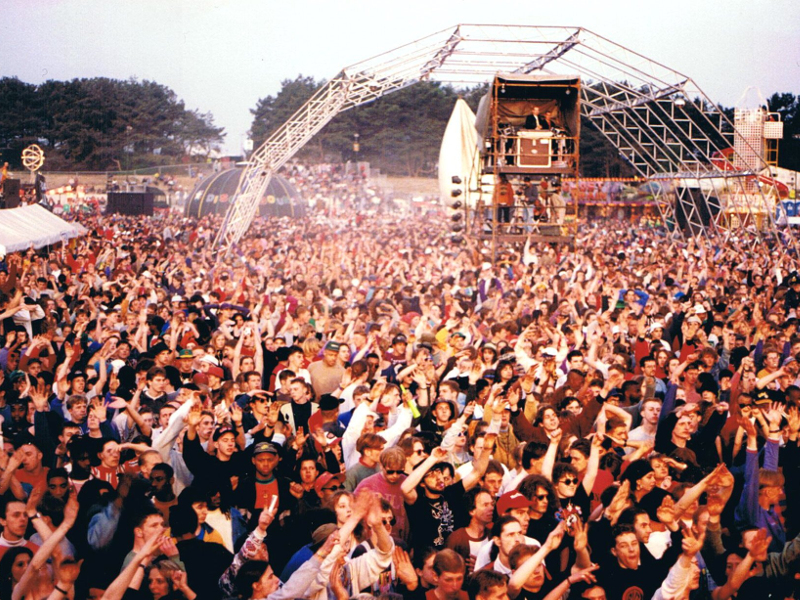
Fantazia Summertime rave, May 1992

The rave scene expanded rapidly in the early 1990s, both at clubs up and down the country including Labrynth, Shelley's Laserdome, The Eclipse, and Sanctuary Music Arena, and large raves in Warehouses and in the open air attracting 10–25,000 whether put on legally from promoters such as Fantazia, Dreamscape, and Raindance, or unlicensed by free party sound systems such as Spiral Tribe. These events featured the popular rave DJs such as Fabio and Grooverider, Carl Cox, Top Buzz, and Slipmatt, as well as live PAs from rave acts including Shades of Rhythm and Bizarre Inc. Breakbeat hardcore drew its melting pot of sound from a vast array of influences – from new beat and Belgian techno that had for a short period been prominent in the UK rave scene, to house and acid house, and furthermore drawing on hip-hop and reggae culture.

Amongst the influences from within the rave scene itself upon which this strain of hardcore drew were such acts as Manix, The Hypnotist, Ravesignal, and T99. From outside of the rave scene, the sped-up breakbeats of UK rap acts such as Hardnoise, MC Duke, Demon Boyz, and Hijack were highly influential, with some of these including Duke, The Criminal Minds, and Liam Howlett (of Cut 2 Kill and who would go on to form the Prodigy), making the transition into hardcore. Pioneering the fusion of sounds from acid house, hip-hop, and reggae were late 1980s UK hip house veterans like Double Trouble and Rebel MC, Blapps Posse, and Shut Up and Dance, becoming pivotal contributors to hardcore and its derivative genres like jungle.

The huge increase in producers was also driven by the increasing availability of cheap home computer-based studio setups, particularly Cubase for the Atari ST.

=== Mid-1990s: fragmentation ===
By late 1992, breakbeat hardcore started to fragment into a number of subsequent genres: darkcore (piano rolls giving way to dark-themed samples and stabs), hardcore jungle (where reggae basslines and samples became prominent), and happy hardcore (retaining piano rolls and more uplifting vocals).

=== 2000s: revival ===
In the 2000s, the style experienced a revival as part of the nu-rave scene in hardcore breaks. Hardcore breaks is inspired by the sound and characteristics of breakbeat hardcore, while being fused with modern production techniques that distinguish the genre from the classic hardcore breakbeat sound. The music is composed of looped, edited and processed breakbeat samples, intense bassline sounds, melodic piano lines, staccato synthesizer riffs, and various vocal samples (mostly taken from old house records). The speed of this genre typically fell between the range of 145–155 bpm, while the speed may variate on live sets. Originally being produced by a small group of artists with the vision of carrying on where oldskool hardcore left off before the jungle and happy hardcore split using new production techniques and technology, its appeal has now expanded to include artists from the original breakbeat hardcore scene creating new productions. By the late 2000s, hardcore breaks tend to be produced and played at a bit faster tempos, often between 160–180 bpm. Therefore, it is often played at UK hardcore, freeform hardcore and drum and bass events.

== See also ==
- Darkcore
- Jungle
- Happy hardcore
