= Belgian hardcore techno =

Music genre

- Stylistic origins: New beat; hard beat; skizzo; techno; EBM; acid house; rave music
- Cultural origins: Early 1990s, Belgium
- Typical instruments: Synthesizer; drum machine; sequencer
- Derivative forms: Hardcore techno; gabber; breakbeat hardcore; hard NRG

Belgian hardcore techno (also referred to as Belgian techno or rave techno) is an early style of hardcore techno that emerged from new beat as EBM and techno influences became more prevalent in this genre. This particular style has been described as an "apocalyptic, almost Wagnerian, bombastic techno", due to its use of dramatic orchestral stabs and menacing synth tones that set it apart from earlier forms of electronic dance music. It flourished in Belgium and influenced the sound of early hardcore from Netherlands, Germany, Italy, UK and North America during the early-1990s, as a part of the rave movement during that period.

Belgian hardcore is related to both European techno and hardcore techno, being generally considered an early form of the latter. The genre is referred to by several other names, such as "Belgian rave" and "bretter tekkno".

The immediate predecessors of Belgian hardcore were two short-lived new beat subgenres called "hard beat" and "skizzo".

== History ==
Originally a slow form of electronic dance music, Belgian new beat evolved into a native form of hardcore techno during the early 1990s with the introduction of techno records played at their intended speeds or slightly accelerated. This brutal new hardcore style spread throughout Europe's rave circuit and reached the pop charts. The Belgian hardcore sound also influenced part of the UK and US rave scenes.

The genre was spearheaded by Belgian producers from the new beat scene, like Frank de Wulf, Olivier Abbeloos, Maurice Engelen, Oliver Adams and Nikki Van Lierop. This style of music was also pioneered by Dutch projects like Human Resource, L.A. Style and Holy Noise. Outside mainland Europe, a small group of producers adopted the style in the UK. The main labels that developed this style in the UK were Kickin’ Records, Vinyl Solution, Rabbit City, Edge and Rising High. Producer Caspar Pound of Rising High Records, known by its stage name "The Hypnotist", was a vocal supporter of this style of hardcore techno.

The most notable achievement of this style of hardcore in the pop charts is L.A. Style's single "James Brown Is Dead" reaching the Billboard's Hot 100 Airplay chart. Notable acts like The Immortals, 2 Unlimited, 2 Fabiola and AB Logic achieved relative success blending the style with dance-pop. After a brief period of expansion during the mid 90s, the style lost popularity, while modern hardcore techno (gabber), trance, happy hardcore and jungle music took place as the leading genres within the rave circuit.

== Characteristics ==
Being rooted in the sounds of new beat, EBM and techno, Belgian hardcore has been characterized as a "distinctively Belgian brand of industrial-tinged techno where melody was displaced by noise". In fact, R&S label owner Renaat Vandepapeliere considered that the Belgian sound was result of the mixture of industrial music, new beat, techno and acid house.

It is a mainly a four on the floor style of dance music, harder and faster than its new beat and techno predecessors, but slower (between 120 and 140 BPM) than gabber and modern hardcore techno. In comparison to these styles, it also lacks the highly distorted drum kick. It also differs from breakbeat hardcore in that it does not focus on the breakbeat drum pattern or lacks it altogether. Many of the songs in this style take cue from the KLF's 1988 instrumental anthem "What Time Is Love?", with similar fanfares, blended with rock-like patterns similar to Rhythm Device's 1989 hard beat song "Acid Rock". The heavy use of synth "stabs" (short, one-hit samples of orchestra hits or synth chords), is considered one of the main characteristics of this style, a feature that was pioneered by Belgian producers and set this style apart from previous styles of house and techno, paving the way for the emergence of breakbeat hardcore and gabber.

Music journalist Simon Reynolds has written detailed accounts on Belgian hardcore techno, covering bands like Second Phase, T99, L.A. Style and Human Resource. Many iconic synth sounds or "stabs" of the early rave scene were popularized by these and other producers during the early 1990s, like the "mentasm" or "hoover" and the "Anasthasia" stabs. Brooklyn's DJ-producer Joey Beltram musical contribution to the Belgian label R&S Records was a cornerstone of the iconic Belgian rave sounds and anthems that emerged in this period. These synth sounds and other sound-effects like alarms, sirens and church bells were widely used in the genre, creating a sense of emergency and insurgency through music.

Many of the iconic rave sounds that emerged initially within Belgian hardcore, would later be adopted by genres like breakbeat hardcore, jungle, darkcore, techstep, gabber, hard house, hard NRG, happy hardcore, hardstyle and fidget house.

== Notable record labels ==
- R&S Records
- Byte Records
- Hithouse
- Big Time International
- Who's That Beat?
- Music Man Records
- Antler-Subway
- Rave 55
- USA Import Music
- Go Bang! Records
- Beat Box International
- DiKi Records
- Kaos Dance Records
- Complete Kaos
- Dance Device
- Mid-Town Records
- ESP Records
- Buzz
- Freaky Records
- Decadance Records
- Mackenzie Records

== See also ==
- New beat - The Belgian late 1980s genre and scene from which Belgian hardcore came from.
- Breakbeat hardcore - A closely related genre from the UK rave scene of the same period.
- Hardcore techno - The broader music genre that includes Belgian hardcore.
- The Sound of Belgium - a documentary that covers the Belgian perspective on subjects including EBM, new beat and hardcore techno.
- Energy Flash - a book by English music journalist Simon Reynolds. Chapter four has a detailed account of this genre, its sound, history and impact.
