= Styles of house music =

== A ==
Acid house

Emphasizes a repetitive, hypnotic and trance-like style, often with samples or spoken lines instead of lyrics. It has core electronic "squelch" sounds that were developed around the mid-1980s, particularly by DJs from Chicago who experimented with the Roland TB-303 electronic synthesizer-sequencer.

Afro house

Afro house is the South African subgenre of house music that started as a niche underground genre involving elements of kwaito, tribal house, deep house, and soulful house music.

Afro tech

Afro tech is a subgenre of house music which originates and is predominantly made in South Africa. It is a combination of classic techno sounds, led by African percussion and various indigenous African instruments.

Amapiano

Amapiano is a popular style of house originating in Gauteng, South Africa in mid to late 2010s. Amapiano is a sophisticated hybrid of deep house, jazz and lounge music characterized by synths, airy pads, wide (log drum) basslines, and deep low pitched kicks.

Ambient house

Ambient house is a subgenre of house music that first emerged in the late 1980s, combining elements of acid house and ambient music.

== B ==
Balearic beat

Also known as Balearic house, initially was an eclectic blend of DJ-led dance music that emerged in the mid-1980s. It later became the name of a more specific style of electronic dance music that was popular into the mid-1990s. Balearic beat was named for its association with European nightclubs and beach raves on Ibiza, a tourist destination in the Balearic islands. Some dance music compilations referred to it as "the sound of Ibiza", even though many other, more aggressive and upbeat forms of dance music could be heard on the island.

Ballroom

Also known as Vogue, is a style of house music emerging in the late 1980s from the gay, transgender and drag ballroom culture. Known for being played at drag balls, the music favors hard-hitting rhythms over melodies, with MCs (commentators) sometimes providing rapping or other vocal tracks. This is not to be confused with the Garage House, Diva House or Euro House being played at the time, which place more emphasis on soulful melodies and anthemic builds. The music itself is often a component to modelling dancing, such as vogue, or to drag competitions. Some notable examples include "The Ha Dance" by Masters at Work or "Cunty" by Kevin Aviance.

Baltimore club

Baltimore club is a style of house music closely related to the "booty bass" of ghetto house and Miami bass. It is characterized by a heavy use of looped vocal samples similar to ghetto house but with breakbeat drum patterns at around 130 bpm. These samples are often of popular hip hop and contemporary R&B songs or of pop culture references such as themes from television shows. It often features horns and call-and-response vocals similar to Go-Go. It originated in Baltimore in the late 1980s.

Bass house

Bass house is a style of house that appeared in the early-mid 2010s. The genre combines elements of riddim and UK bass, and often plays with heavy distortion. Early bass house filled the entire frequency spectrum, during the drop, with a single bass pattern. The tempo is most often set around 128 bpm.

Big room house

Big room house songs straddle Dutch house, often incorporating drops built around minimalist, percussion drops, regular beats, sub-bass layered kicks, simple melodies and synth-driven breakdowns.

Bloghouse

Bloghouse or blog house (also known as bloghaus) is a loosely defined microgenre and musical scene that draws from various styles of electronic dance and indie music. Originally emerging in the early 2000s and peaking in popularity between 2006-2008. The term refers to the way artists distributed their music via music blogs and early social media platforms such as Myspace, with the music often associated with various styles of house music such as French electro (electro house variant, influenced by electroclash and nu-disco), fidget house, French house, tech house, nu rave, and other European electronic-associated disco and rock music trends of that time. The sound is most often inspired by and derived from New York's electroclash scene, and characterized by a mix of disco elements, buzzy electro house distortions, electro-rock energetic and French touch's gleaming synths within listed styles.

Brazilian bass

Brazilian bass is a subgenre of house music that originated as a derivation of mainstream deep house of early 2010s, fused with tech house elements and some minimalistic influences from bass house. The tempo typically range from 120 to 125 bpm. The genre is characterized by distinguishable deep punchy basslines, often making use of low-pitched and filtering effects. The genre was created in Brasília around the mid-2010s, but its national and international repercussion only happened in 2016 with DJ Alok.

== C ==
Classic house

The original form of house music, originated in the mid and late 1980s. The name is usually associated with Chicago house or garage house.

Chicago house

The first style of house music from 1980s' Chicago. Simple basslines, four to the floor percussion, hi hats, and synths. Influenced by disco, post-disco, soul, funk, and hip hop.

Chicago hard house

Chicago hard house was developed by DJs such as Bad Boy Bill, DJ Lynnwood, and DJ Irene, Richard "Humpty" Vission, mixing elements of Chicago house, funky house and hard house. Similar to gabber or hardcore techno from the Netherlands, this was associated with the "rebel", underground club subculture of the time. These three producers introduced new production approaches and sounds in late 20th century became more prominent and widely used during first decade of the 21st century.

Complextro

Complextro is typified by glitchy, intricate basslines and textures created by sharply cutting between instruments in quick succession.

== D ==
Deep house

A (slightly) slower variant of house (around 120 BPM) with greater influences from soul, jazz, and funk.

Diva house

Diva house or handbag house is an anthemic subgenre of house music that became most popular in gay clubs during the second half of the 1980s.

Dutch house

A style of electro house music from the Netherlands, originating around 2006. Tracks are typically made up of complex percussion and drumbeats, dramatic buildups and short riffs of high-pitched synths.

== E ==
Electro house

A subgenre of house music that has had influence from '80s music. Though its origins are hazy – different sources claim influence from '80s-electro, electroclash, pop, synthpop, or tech house – it has since become a hard form of house music.

== F ==
Fidget house

A subgenre of electro house that involves a very erratic, bouncing, skitchy, grimy, funky, squeaking melody, usually consisting of very short and high pitched notes, often produced by altering the pitch of percussion instruments, based around a repetitive bass line, and hypnotic beat.

French house

A late 1990s house sound developed in France. Inspired by the '70s and '80s funk and disco sounds. Mostly features a typical sound "filter" effect and lower bpm.

Funky house

Funky house as it sounds today first started to develop during the late 1990s. It can again be sub-divided into many other types of house music. French house, Italian house, disco house, Latin house and many other types of house have all contributed greatly to what is today known as funky house. It is recognizable by its often very catchy bassline, swooshes, swirls and other synthesized sounds which give the music a bouncy tempo. It often relies heavily on black female vocals or disco samples and has a recognizable tiered structure in which every track has more than one build-up which usually reaches a climax before the process is repeated with the next track.

Future funk

Future funk is a sample-based development of Nu-disco which formed out of the Vaporwave scene and genre in the early 2010s. It tends to be more energetic than vaporwave, incorporating elements of French house, synth funk, and utilising vaporwave editing techniques.

Future house

A style originating in the mid-2010s, often described as a fusion of UK garage and deep house with other elements and techniques from EDM, popularized in late 2014 into 2015, often blends deep/metallic/sax hooks with heavy drops somewhat like the ones found in future garage.

Future rave

Future rave is a subgenre of house music, combining trance music and progressive house with a futuristic techno sound. The term was coined by producers David Guetta and MORTEN in 2019, and became popular worldwide by the early 2020s.

== G ==
Garage house

One of the first house genres with origins set in New York and New Jersey. It was named after the Paradise Garage nightclub in New York that operated from 1977 to 1987 under the influential resident DJ Larry Levan. Garage house developed alongside Chicago house and the result was house music sharing its similarities, influencing each other. Garage house is generally piano oriented, a sound deriving from soul and disco, with a heavy emphasis on vocals, preferably female. One contrast from Chicago house was that the vocals in garage house drew stronger influences from gospel.

Ghetto house

Features minimal 808 and 909 drum machine-driven tracks and sometimes sexually explicit lyrics.

Ghettotech

It combines elements of Chicago's ghetto house with electro, Detroit techno, Miami bass and UK garage. It features four-on-the-floor rhythms and is usually faster than most other dance music genres, at roughly 145 to 160 BPM.

Gqom

A style of house music originating in Durban, South Africa.

== H ==
Hard NRG

By 1996–97, there was a steady flow of UK based hard house that threw away the fun and uplifting parts to incorporate the "Hoover" & other gritty, menacing sounding elements at a slightly higher tempo than the conventional hard house and thus, the style effectively became known as "Nu-NRG" when Blu Peter coined the phrase in a magazine interview.

Hip house

Hip house is a musical genre that mixes elements of house music and hip hop. The style rose to prominence during the late 1980s in Chicago and New York.

== I ==
Italo house

Slick production techniques, catchy melodies, rousing piano lines and American vocal styling typifies the Italian ("Italo") house sound. A modulating Giorgio Moroder style bassline is also characteristic of this style.

== J ==
Jazz house

Jazz house is a style of house music closely related to deep house, which can be described as an attempt to translate the atmosphere of jazz music into an electronic setting. Larry Heard is called to be the first to layer his productions with jazz-based chords and atmospheres. The compositions are mostly based on jazz samples, but also does not preclude the use of live musical instruments sometimes, while when the jazz techniques and instrumentation begins to dominate over the house structure, then such music is classified as nu-jazz.

Jersey club

Jersey club is Newark's equivalent of Baltimore club. It also roots from bounce and Newark's earlier house scene, Jersey club is a staccato, bass-heavy style of dance music featuring breakbeats, rapid tempos around 130–140 bpm, and heavily chopped samples often from hip hop or pop music.

Juke house

Juke house or Chicago juke characteristically uses beat-skipping kick drums, pounding rapidly (and at times very sparsely) in syncopation with crackling snares, claps, and other sounds reminiscent of old drum machines.

Jackin house

House music that is meant to be a callback to the 1980s, with old-time samples being featured, plus funk-like basslines usually constituted of frequency modulating analog waveforms, a large use of repetition, and is meant to overall be a fun type of music to listen to.

== K ==
Kwaito

Kwaito is a music genre that emerged in Johannesburg, South Africa, during the 1990s. It is a variant of house music featuring the use of African sounds and samples.

== L ==
Latin house

Borrows heavily from Latin dance music such as salsa, Brazilian beats, Latin jazz etc. It is most popular on the East Coast of the United States, especially in Miami and the New York City metropolitan area. Another variant of Latin house, which began in the mid-1990s, was derived in the Los Angeles metropolitan area and is based on more Mexican-centric styles of music such as mariachi. Artists include Proyecto Uno (best known for "El tiburón").

Lo-fi house

Lo-fi house emerged in the mid-2010s as a variant of outsider house, combining rough sounds with a melancholic, ironic aesthetic influenced by vaporwave. Producers in this genre craft tracks reminiscent of 1990s deep house recorded on cassette, featuring muffled drums, fuzzy synths, and a gauzy atmosphere. The style is known by its unique blend of raw elements and nostalgic tones.

== M ==
Melodic house

Melodic house is a house music subgenre that has a heady, melodic, arpeggiator-heavy sound. The genre has close ties with melodic techno with the differences that mostly characterize the difference between house and techno. Both genres derived from progressive house which is itself derived from trance music, while melodic house also draws its roots in the early 2010s deep house scene and thus remains more beat-oriented, retaining house structure. Melodic techno has a more atmospheric and hypnotic sound, with emphasis on arpeggiated minor melodies closely tying it with progressive trance. The tempo of the genres stays around 120 bpm, while melodic techno could be slightly faster sometimes, but usually not higher than 130 bpm.

Microhouse

Microhouse or minimal house is a derivative of tech house and minimal techno with sparse composition and production.

Moombahton

Fusion of Dutch house and reggaeton at 108–112 bpm, largely coined by Dave Nada and Dillon Francis.

== N ==
New Jersey sound

New Jersey sound or Jersey sound is a genre of house music originating in Newark, New Jersey during the early 1980s. It was a type of deep and garage house with an emphasis on soulful vocals influenced by Newark's gospel legacy.

Nu-disco

Nu-disco or sometimes disco house (though this title can also refer to funky house and to a style of French house), is a genre which came about in 2002 as a renewed interest in 1970s and early 1980s disco, Italo disco, Euro disco and P-Funk.

== O ==
Outsider house

Outsider house (also referred to as outsider dance) is a genre of electronic music combining elements of house music, techno and noise music. The music is often rough-sounding and "lo-fi".

Organic house

Organic house is a mellow and groovy subgenre of house music that emphasizes on acoustic instruments and natural sounds. The genre was made as a way to express a "deeper, more meditative, and occasionally slower shades of house music", often combining elements of Deep House, Melodic House, Electronica, and Afro House.

== P ==
Progressive house

Progressive house is typified by accelerating peaks and troughs throughout a track's duration and are, in general, less obvious than in hard house. Layering different sounds on top of each other and slowly bringing them in and out of the mix is a key idea behind the progressive movement. It is often related to trance music, in particular progressive trance from which the differences from progressive house are often considered nominal.

== R ==
Rally house

A subgenre of house music which started in about 2023 with a four on the floor beat, piano or synth stabs and spoken vocal samples. Though the term 'Rally House' may have been cemented by prod. DTM's 2024 track of the same name, photos of rally cars are present on the album art of older releases, such as PXRKX's 2023 track MARLBORO CLUB. The subgenre is also meant to be evocative of retro gaming and may include bitcrushing, CRT humming, (on album covers) designs similar to branding found on video game packaging or (in video edits) footage of Playstation-era racing video games.

== S ==
Scouse house

A style of UK hard house which first emerged around 1999. Unlike other hard house genres, it features an upbeat, energetic sound and heavily focuses on the 'pipe' sample as an offbeat bassline, which usually represents a 'donk' sound.

Slap house

A subgenre of house that derived of deep house during the late 2010s. The genre usually plays around 120 bpm. Slap house is closely related to Brazilian bass, but has less bombastic sound design, more melodic and contains radio-friendly elements, comparing to club-oriented Brazilian bass. The name arose due to the bouncy baselines being reminiscent of disco bassists playing their instruments with a technique called slap bass. The songs of this new genre have more present and strong beats and even more elaborate melodies than their Brazilian version. Also, the songs are lacking in clap at the beginning.

Soulful house

Soulful house is a genre characterised by smooth and soulful vocals, relaxed atmosphere and melodic structure, as well as by influences from soul, jazz and funk. Tracks are distinguished by slower tempos (122 to 127 bpm), keyboards that give a deep sound, similar to the one from chill-out and lounge. House rhythms are often accompanied by instruments such as piano, guitar, bass guitar, double bass. Therefore, producers often collaborate with vocalists and live musicians. The tracks often feature solos by typical jazz wind instruments, such as saxophone or trumpet. Soulful house is a dance music genre due to its house beat and rhythm, but can also be heard as background music in restaurants and shops as well as on high fashion shows due to its relaxed, easy-going rhythm and refined sounds. Sometimes the genre perceived as a dance version of genres such as nu jazz and lounge.

== T ==
Tech house

Tech house derived from the word "Techno" Often made with tempo ranging from 120 to 130 bpm. Mainly consisting of fusion between house music with elements of techno in its arrangement and instrumentation. The number of elements are kept to a minimum mainly focusing on the kick drum, sub bass and bass. The bass is distorted in order to achieve the authenticity of techno while it is mostly played off-beat to create the distinction of house music.

Tribal house

Popularized by remixer/DJ Steve Lawler in UK, and Junior Vasquez in New York, it is characterized by much percussion and world music rhythms.

Tropical house

Tropical house, often abbreviated as trop house, is a fairly new house music subgenre. It is characterized by a summer feeling, incorporating instruments such as saxophones, steel drums, electro synths, and marimbas. The vibe is generally lighter and more relaxed compared to other genres such as deep house.

Trouse

Trouse is a style of house music combining elements of uplifting trance, festival progressive house and electro house. It was popularised in the early 2010s by artists like Swedish House Mafia and Avicii.

== U ==
UK hard house

A style of house music dating back to the early '90s, hard house is defined by its aggressive sounds and distorted beats. One of the most recognizable of these is the Hoover sound, invented by Joey Beltram. Dominant labels in the 1990s were Tidy Trax, Nukleuz Records and Tripoli Trax.

== Related genres ==
These genres have origins partly in house music, and may have 'house' in the title, but they belong to other genres of electronic music.

Bassline house

Emphasizes bass, similar to dubstep and grime, with most songs around 135 to 142 bpm. It originated from speed garage in Sheffield around 2002.

Dembow

Dembow is a musical rhythm that originated in Jamaica, it is somewhat reminiscent of reggaeton and dancehall music, but with a more constant rhythm and faster than reggaeton.

Dream trance

Dream trance or dream house, an oriented instrumental melody with relaxing beats.

Dubstep

Dubstep originated in South London in the late 1990s. It is generally characterised by sparse, syncopated rhythmic patterns with prominent sub-bass frequencies. The style emerged as an offshoot of UK garage.

Folk house (folktronica)

Folk house is development of folktronica. It's a fusion of folk music and deep house, popularized in Sweden in the late 2010s.

Electro swing

Electro swing or swing house is a genre of electronic dance music that fuses 1920s–1940s jazz styles including swing music and big band with 2000s styles including house, electro, hip hop, drum & bass and dubstep.

Footwork

The genre evolved from the earlier, rapid rhythms of juke and ghetto house. It may draw from styles such as drum and bass, utilizing double-time clave triplets, syncopated toms and prominent sub-bass.

Hardbass

A style of house music which originated from Russia during the late '90s, drawing inspiration from UK hard house, bouncy techno, Scouse house, powerstomp and hardstyle. Hardbass is characterized by its fast tempo (usually 150–160 BPM), donks, distinctive basslines (commonly known as "hard bounce"), distorted sounds, heavy kicks and occasional rapping. One of the most popular hardbass tracks is DJ Snat's "Choose Your Power" from 2003.

New beat

A rather brief phenomenon, new beat emerged in Belgium during the late 1980s as a midtempo variation of techno and acid house. It played an important role in the development of early techno in Western Europe.

Witch house

Witch house (also known as drag or haunted house) is an occult-themed dark electronic music microgenre and visual aesthetic that emerged in the late 2000s and early 2010s.

== See also ==
- List of electronic music genres
- List of house music artists
