= James Blake (album) =

Studio album by James Blake
- Released: 7 February 2011
- Recorded: 2009–2010
- Genres: Electro-soul; post-dubstep; blue-eyed soul; electro-R&B; experimental
- Length: 38:00
- Labels: ATLAS; A&M; Polydor
- Producer: James Blake

James Blake chronology
Klavierwerke (2010)	James Blake (2011)	Enough Thunder (2011)

Singles from James Blake
- 1. "Limit to Your Love" Released: 25 November 2010; 2. "The Wilhelm Scream" Released: 3 March 2011; 3. "Lindisfarne"/"Unluck" Released: 16 June 2011

Deluxe Edition

Singles from James Blake (Deluxe Edition)
- 1. "Fall Creek Boys Choir" Released: 29 August 2011; 2. "A Case of You" Released: 19 December 2011

James Blake is the debut studio album by English singer-songwriter James Blake. It was released in both the United Kingdom and the United States on his own label, ATLAS, supported by A&M Records, on 7 February 2011. The release was supported with the release of its first single, "Limit to Your Love", on 28 November 2010.

The album was released to widespread critical acclaim, and was nominated for the 2011 Mercury Prize. A deluxe edition was released on 10 October 2011 with different artwork and bundled with a second disc, Blake's then-new EP Enough Thunder, which was also released separately.

== Background ==
James Blake builds on the material released by Blake as three EPs in 2010: The Bells Sketch, CMYK and Klavierwerke. All three EPs have differing musical styles. Mike Powell of online music magazine Pitchfork noted it was "amazing" that so much material could be released in such a short period of time. However, despite the amount of music released by Blake in 2010, most of the material on his debut album is completely new.

In interviews about the album, Blake cited fellow Londoners the xx as an influence, telling Clash's Robin Murray their success with debut xx "made it a lot easier for me". He added that the band's acclaim meant listeners "are gonna be a lot less shocked by [this album]".

Blake, speaking to Jo Youle and Mark Savage of the BBC, said that a lot of the vocals on the album were by him, despite relying more heavily on samples in previous work. "There are times when it might seem there's a sample being used, but I've just sampled myself. That's what makes this record special compared to everything [else] I've done."

Before the album's release, Blake was named in both BBC's "Sound of 2011" shortlist, and came second to Jessie J in the running for the BRIT Awards' Critics' Choice Award.

== Composition ==
Grayson Currin of Pitchfork noted that the album is "composed of tender torch songs, elegiac drifters, and soulful melodies, Blake's first puts him in the rare company of fellow singers-- Thom Yorke, Karin Dreijer, Antony Hegarty, Justin Vernon, Dan Bejar-- who've recently bent their own lavish voices, not samples, to make interesting pop music shaped with electronics". Blake has evidently done this with many tracks on the album.

The album begins with "Unluck", a post-dubstep song with multi-layered vocals (processed through the use of Auto-Tune and vocoders) and distorted synths. The second track, "The Wilhelm Scream" is a cover version of "Where to Turn" by his father, James Litherland. "The Wilhelm Scream" is built around soft synth tones and booming percussion which gradually increases in volume to create a slightly claustrophobic sound.

The third track, "I Never Learnt to Share" is a post-dubstep song with elements of electronic rock and soul music, beginning with repetitive a cappella vocals, then adding in electric guitars and lush keyboards. The song has a unique bass drop three minutes and forty seconds into the song. This is then followed by the two-part "Lindisfarne". "Lindisfarne I" is entirely a cappella, while "Lindisfarne II" takes these vocals (with some new lines added) and pairs them with acoustic guitar and light percussion. Both parts of the song extensively use vocoders and Auto-Tune.

The album's sixth track, "Limit to Your Love", is a minimalist dubstep cover of the song of the same name by Feist. The song uses only Blake's singing, piano, percussion, and a wobble bassline. This is followed by "Give Me My Month", a short piano ballad, also a minimalist piece.

In the album's eighth track, "To Care (Like You)", Blake pitch shifts, cuts-up, and layers his own vocals and combines them with quiet keyboards and a bass-heavy and very percussive beat. "Why Don't You Call Me" opens with only voice and piano, "played with the studied delicacy of a classical student". Blake then splices up the piano chords and vocals to create unique breaks.

In "I Mind", Blake creates a wobble bass out of "incomprehensible vocal loops", Latin-American rhythms and distorted bass noises. As with the last track, "Why Don't You Call Me", it begins solely with piano and vocals. The album concludes with "Measurements", in which critics noted that Blake's layered vocals sound like a black gospel choir. Popmatters also noted that the song contains elements of synth-pop.

The deluxe edition of the album, in addition to being packaged with the Enough Thunder EP, adds two new tracks originally exclusive to the vinyl version (and added in the same places as they were on the vinyl album). "Tep and the Logic" is added as track 1 and "You Know Your Youth" is added as track 13. The two are IDM songs with chopped up vocals and light keyboards and piano.

The songs "Why Don't You Call Me" and "You Know Your Youth" include samples of a cover of Joni Mitchell's "A Case of You" performed and recorded by Blake himself. Another recording of this cover appears on the Enough Thunder EP, which was packaged with the deluxe edition of the album as well as being released separately, but the recording sampled on these tracks remains unreleased.

== Critical reception ==
Professional ratings
Aggregate scores
Source	Rating
AnyDecentMusic?	8.1/10
Metacritic	81/100
Review scores
Source	Rating
AllMusic	3/5 stars
The A.V. Club	A
The Daily Telegraph	4/5 stars
Entertainment Weekly	B+
The Guardian	4/5 stars
NME	6/10
Pitchfork	9.0/10
Q	4/5 stars
Rolling Stone	3.5/5 stars
Spin	8/10

James Blake received critical acclaim from critics. At Metacritic, which assigns a normalized rating out of 100 to reviews from mainstream critics, the album received an average score of 81, based on 38 reviews, which indicates "universal acclaim". Writing for Spin, journalist Philip Sherburne described the album as "singular and striking," stating that "using lo-fi digital techniques to play up rough edges and raw emotion, Blake’s rare talent is to make music so naked seem unshakable." Chris Martins of The A.V. Club characterized it as "dubstep’s crossover moment, rolling back the hostile skronk and centering on a croon that rivals Antony Hegarty for lovelorn beauty." Pitchfork's Grayson Currin described its songs as "gorgeous, indelible tunes that are as generous in content as they are restrained in delivery," while stating that "Blake's musicianship and sonics are equally striking." For The Guardian, Alexis Petridis wrote that "even at its most impenetrable, the album leaves you in a state of charmed confusion: you frequently have no idea what's going to happen next," adding that "you struggle to imagine it being made at any point in time before now."

Matthew Cole of Slant Magazine wrote that "the combination of traditionalist songwriting and avant-garde sonics is what makes James Blake such a compelling listen," while nonetheless noting that "too often Blake either mistakes his process, which is admittedly fascinating, for an end in itself, or worse, uses his sonic abstractionism to cover over a song’s lack of interesting ideas." In a less optimistic review, Alex Denney of NME opined that "ultimately Blake isn’t yet the singer-songwriter to pull this album off," writing that "the blazing production talent behind [Blake's early releases] CMYK and "Air And Lack Thereof" is sadly absent at times, and the album generally works best where Blake is able to match his interest in traditional songwriting with a more textured approach." AllMusic critic Andy Kellman described the record as consisting of tracks "more like exercises in sound manipulation and reduction than songs. The approach is no fault, but Blake pares it down to such an extent that the material occasionally sounds not just tentative but feeble, fatigued, even".

=== Accolades ===
Pitchfork ranked the album as the 12th best album of 2011 on its list of "The Top 50 Albums of 2011" while Mojo placed the album at number 17 and Uncut placed the album at number 21. In Review Online ranked the album number six on their list of "The Top 15 Albums of 2011." Pitchfork would later place the album at number 52 on their list of the Top 100 albums of the decade so far (2010–2014), with readers ranking the album at 197 on the 200 best albums between 1996 and 2021.

== Track listing ==
All tracks written and produced by James Blake, except where noted.

No.	Title	Length
1.	"Unluck"	3:00
2.	"The Wilhelm Scream" (written by James Litherland and Blake)	4:37
3.	"I Never Learnt to Share"	4:51
4.	"Lindisfarne I"	2:42
5.	"Lindisfarne II" (written and produced by Blake and Rob McAndrews)	3:01
6.	"Limit to Your Love" (written by Feist and Jason "Gonzales" Charles Beck)	4:36
7.	"Give Me My Month"	1:56
8.	"To Care (Like You)"	3:52
9.	"Why Don't You Call Me"	1:35
10.	"I Mind"	3:31
11.	"Measurements"	4:19
Total length:		38:00

Deluxe Edition CD1 (and also Vinyl Edition)
No.	Title	Length
1.	"Tep and the Logic"	2:42
2.	"Unluck"	3:00
3.	"The Wilhelm Scream"	4:37
4.	"I Never Learnt to Share"	4:51
5.	"Lindisfarne I"	2:42
6.	"Lindisfarne II" (written and produced by Blake and McAndrews)	3:01
7.	"Limit to Your Love" (written by Feist and Gonzales)	4:36
8.	"Give Me My Month"	1:56
9.	"To Care (Like You)"	3:52
10.	"Why Don't You Call Me"	1:35
11.	"I Mind"	3:31
12.	"Measurements"	4:22
13.	"You Know Your Youth"	2:22
Total length:		43:07

Deluxe Edition CD2: Enough Thunder EP*
No.	Title	Length
1.	"Once We All Agree"	4:23
2.	"We Might Feel Unsound"	4:00
3.	"Fall Creek Boys Choir" (with Bon Iver; written and produced by Blake and Justin Vernon)	4:33
4.	"A Case of You" (written by Joni Mitchell and produced by Miti Adhikari)	2:57
5.	"Not Long Now"	5:23
6.	"Enough Thunder"	4:15
Total length:		25:31

Notes

- The Enough Thunder EP was also released separately.
- "Why Don't You Call Me" and "You Know Your Youth" contain samples of James Blake's cover of "A Case of You", originally by Joni Mitchell.

== Personnel ==
- James Blake – writing (all tracks except "Limit to Your Love"), performance, production, recording (all tracks)
- Rob McAndrews – writing, performance, production, recording ("Lindisfarne II")
- Dan Foat – management, A&R
- Matt Colton – mastering
- Erika Wall – cover photograph
- Alexander Brown – design

== Charts ==
=== Weekly charts ===
Chart (2011)	Peak position
Australian Albums (ARIA)	32
Austrian Albums (Ö3 Austria)	15
Belgian Albums (Ultratop Flanders)	1
Belgian Albums (Ultratop Wallonia)	24
Danish Albums (Hitlisten)	2
Dutch Albums (Album Top 100)	6
French Albums (SNEP)	152
German Albums (Offizielle Top 100)	27
Irish Albums (IRMA)	11
Italian Albums (FIMI)	81
New Zealand Albums (RMNZ)	38
Norwegian Albums (VG-lista)	5
Scottish Albums (Official Charts)	22
Spanish Albums (Promusicae)	89
Swedish Albums (Sverigetopplistan)	33
Swiss Albums (Schweizer Hitparade)	9
UK Albums (Official Charts)	9
US Billboard 200	123
US Top Dance Albums (Billboard)	4
US Heatseekers Albums (Billboard)	1

Chart (2026)	Peak position
UK Dance Albums (Official Charts)	7

=== Year-end charts ===
Chart (2011)	Position
Belgian Albums (Ultratop Flanders)	39
Danish Albums (Hitlisten)	49
US Top Dance/Electronic Albums (Billboard)	18

== Certifications ==
Region	Certification	Certified units/sales
Denmark (IFPI Danmark)	Gold	10,000^{^}
United Kingdom (BPI)	Silver	60,000^{^}
United States	—	65,000
Summaries
Worldwide	—	500,000
^{^} Shipments figures based on certification alone.

== Release history ==
Region	Date	Format	Label
Ireland	7 February 2011	Digital download	Polydor
United Kingdom	7 February 2011	Digital download	Polydor
