= Qui...? =

1988 single by Brussels Sound Revolution

- Single cover

Single by Brussels Sound Revolution
- Released: 1989
- Genre: New beat
- Length: 3:19
- Label: Sound Of Belgium (Belgium); Surf (France)
- Songwriter: Paul Delnoy
- Producer: Godzilla

"Qui…?" (Translation: "Who…?") is a 1989 Belgian novelty song hit by the new beat band Brussels Sound Revolution. It features samples of the speech Belgian former Prime Minister Paul Vanden Boeynants gave after he had been kidnapped by the gang of Patrick Haemers that same year. It was a hit on both sides of the Belgian language border. In Flanders, Belgium it reached the 28th place in the Radio 2 hitparade at the time for one week.

== History ==
Brussels Sound Revolution was a project by Paul Delnoy, the former bass player of the bands Marine, Snowy Red and La Muerte, and producer Jacky Maurer. The group released one single, Qui...? based on the kidnapping of Paul Vanden Boeynants on January 14, 1989. After a month, on February 13, the kidnappers, Patrick Haemers, Philippe Lacroix, Kapllan Murat, Marc Van Dam and Denise Tyack were arrested and Vanden Boeynants was freed without severe harm. He organized a press conference where he explained what happened during his kidnapping, mentioning that he was angry when his trademark pipe had been stolen, leading to the question: Qui m'a enlevé ma pipe? (Who has taken my pipe?). Denoy and Maurer felt it would be funny to sample parts of Vanden Boeynants' speech and make a song about it in the style of the internationally popular new beat genre. They named their group Brussels Sound Revolution, which shared the same initials as the Brigade Spéciales de Recherche, the police corps who arrested the criminals. The song was called Qui...?, after the recurring refrain. It became a hit in Belgium, received its own music video and sold over 50.000 copies. Vanden Boeynants let the song be, but still asked publicity rights through his lawyer.

Brussels Sound Revolution also recorded a song called C'est Moi, which sampled parts of Patrick Haemers' press conference speech, but this was no success.

== Music video ==
The song received a music video in which a look-a-like of Vanden Boeynants with a bandaged head, sunglasses, pipe clenched between his lips and dressed in a raincoat dances along to the beat. The video also features point-of-view shots of a pipe travelling through the city. In one scene the kidnapping itself is spoofed with toy characters arriving by toy car, beating up another toy character and taking him along with them in the vehicle.

== Similar versions ==
A group named Boucherie Le Touquet, named after Vanden Boeynants' butcher shop, also released a single in 1989 based on samples from the same press conference: Ferme ta gueule (Shut your face), but this wasn’t a success.
