= Limit to Your Love =

Single by James Blake

from the album James Blake
- Released: 25 November 2010
- Recorded: 2010
- Length: 4:37
- Label: R&S
- Songwriters: Leslie Feist; Chilly Gonzales
- Producer: James Blake

James Blake singles chronology
"CMYK" (2009)	"Limit to Your Love" (2010)	"The Wilhelm Scream" (2011)

"The Limit to Your Love" is a song by Canadian musician Feist from her third studio album, The Reminder. It is written by Leslie Feist and Chilly Gonzales (Jason Charles Beck).

English musician James Blake recorded a version as "Limit to Your Love" on his self-titled debut studio album. As a single it was released in the United Kingdom on 25 November 2010, where it debuted on the UK Singles Chart at number 47 and peaked at number 39.

== Track listing ==
Digital download
No.	Title	Length
1.	"Limit to Your Love"	4:37

== Chart performance ==
"Limit to Your Love" debuted on the UK Singles Chart on 12 December 2010 at number 47, falling 10 places to number 57 the following week. On its third week in the chart, the single fell a further 27 places to number 84; climbing 3 places the following week. Having fallen out of the top 100, "Limit to Your Love" re-entered the charts at number 39 on 9 January 2011; following Blake's runner-up position in the Sound of 2011 poll. The single spent one week in the top 40 before falling to number 47 on its sixth week in the chart.

The single also debuted on various charts across Europe during January 2011, including on the Dutch Top 40, where it debuted at number 18 on 8 January; before climbing to a peak of number 7 the following week. "Limit to Your Love" also reached peaks of number 5 and number 42 in Belgium on the Flanders Tip and Wallonia Tip charts respectively. On 24 December 2010, the single debuted at number 3 in Denmark; spending a total of five consecutive weeks within the country's top 40.

== Charts and certifications ==
=== Weekly charts ===
Chart (2010–11)	Peak position
Austria (Ö3 Austria Top 40)	63
Belgium (Ultratop 50 Flanders)	5
Belgium (Ultratop 50 Wallonia)	42
Denmark (Tracklisten)	3
Italy (FIMI)	99
Netherlands (Dutch Top 40)	15
Netherlands (Single Top 100)	7
UK Singles (OCC)	39

=== Year-end charts ===
Chart (2011)	Position
Belgium (Ultratop Flanders)	62

=== Certifications ===
Country (Provider)	Certification	Sales
Denmark (IFPI Denmark)	Gold	15,000

== Release history ==
Region	Date	Format	Label
United Kingdom	25 November 2010	Digital download	R&S
