= Klavierwerke (EP) =

EP by James Blake
- Released: 27 September 2010
- Recorded: 2010
- Genres: Post-dubstep; UK bass; downtempo
- Length: 16:41
- Label: R&S
- Producer: James Blake

James Blake chronology
CMYK (2010)	Klavierwerke (2010)	James Blake (2011)

Klavierwerke is the third solo EP by English singer-songwriter James Blake, who plays all the instruments and produced the record. It was released on R&S Records on 27 September 2010. The word "Klavierwerke" is German for "piano works", as the album is mostly built on piano.

== Composition ==
James Blake changed his style on the EP from gospel and R&B influenced dubstep on CMYK to more piano-based music. According to Blake, the EP is "more personal" than CMYK, and its lyrics are more focused on emotion. The EP has been described as "sadder and more intimate" than his previous releases, and as similar to Mount Kimbie's songs. The title track features some vocal static due to it being recorded on a laptop microphone. The static contrasts with the clear hand claps and bass notes. The next track, "Tell Her Safe" has Blake singing over percussion, with additional light pops and clicks, and a muffled refrain. The song "I Only Know (What I Know Now)" features "twisted" vocals that the BBC likened to the work of Radiohead. "Don't You Think I Do", the final track, has "scattershot keys" and "cascading static" and contains some synthesizer.

== Reception ==
Professional ratings
Review scores
Source	Rating
Pitchfork	8.1/10
Resident Advisor	4.0/5

The album received positive reviews from music critics. In a favourable review, Mike Diver of the BBC wrote "every click beneath another click, every swoosh or sweep from computer keys through programmes and into production, is a fascinating facet of a whole that never once seems unduly overpopulated by elements that others might pronounce with greater emphasis." Joe Colly of Pitchfork named "I Only Know (What I Know Now)" one of the "EP's finest moments" and gave the album a score of 8.1 out of 10.

Resident Advisor gave the album 4 stars out of 5 and stated that "Blake's ingenious move is to seemingly dance around the truth, leaving the listener to figure things out." In 2010, Pitchfork placed the EP and two other Blake EPs, The Bells Sketch and CMYK, collectively at number 8 on its list "The Top 50 Albums of 2010".

== Track listing ==
All tracks are written by James Blake.

No.	Title	Length
1.	"Klavierwerke"	5:06
2.	"Tell Her Safe"	3:15
3.	"I Only Know (What I Know Now)"	5:17
4.	"Don't You Think I Do"	3:05

== Personnel ==
- James Blake – writing, production
- Matt Colton – mastering
- Erika Wall – photograph
- Will Bankhead – design
