= Classics (Joey Beltram album) =

Compilation album by Joey Beltram
- Released: 1996
- Genre: Techno
- Label: R&S
- Producer: Joey Beltram; Mundo Muzique

Classics is a compilation album by Joey Beltram. It was released in 1996 by R&S Records.

== Production and music ==
The album's tracks were initially recorded by Beltram when he was releasing material through R&S Records.

== Release ==
Classics was released in 1996 through R&S Records.

== Reception ==
Professional ratings
Review scores
Source	Rating
AllMusic	4.5/5 stars
Select	4/5

In a contemporary review, Select gave the album a four out of five rating, calling it "Lusher and more human than the ultra-minimal machine music he does now, these tracks from '90–'92 remain exemplary demonstrations of tension generated by restraint." The review noted that tracks like "Psychobase" anticipate tracks from the Chemical Brothers and that "Fuck You All MF" "pre-dates the official investiture of jungle by years."

AllMusic gave the album a four and a half out of five star rating, noting that the album "leaves off some crucial cuts by dint of label affiliation, much of Beltram's most significant early work first appeared on R&S, making this CD/LP a perfect introduction to his influential sound."

== Track listing ==
All track written, produced and performed by Joey Beltram except where noted

No.	Title	Writer(s)	Artist	Length
1.	"Energy Flash"			5:53
2.	"Jazz 303"			4:52
3.	"Subsonic Trance"			3:30
4.	"Psycho Bass"			5:01
5.	"My Sound"			4:05
6.	"The Melody"			4:45
7.	"Sub-Bass Experience"			4:57
8.	"The Reflex"			4:54
9.	"Mind to Mind"	Joey Beltram; Mundo Muzique	Second Phase	5:37
10.	"Mentasm"	Beltram; Mundo Muzique	Second Phase	4:27
11.	"Joey's Riot"		Mental Mayhem	4:29
12.	"The Trance"		Open Mind	4:41
13.	"Groove Attack"		Disorder	3:14
Total length:				1:00:25

== Credits ==
Credits adapted from Classics liner notes.

- Joey Beltram – writer, producer
- Mundo Muzique – writer, producer (tracks 9, 10)
- i-luv.mi.tdr – design
- mcp04:tdr – photography
