= BSR =

BSR may refer to:

- Backslash-R, a class of options in Perl Compatible Regular Expressions
- Basrah International Airport, IATA code
- Vasai Road railway station, Mumbai, India, station code
- Birmingham Sound Reproducers or BSR McDonald, a former UK audio manufacturer
- Bit Scan Reverse, find first set x86 instruction
- Bootstrap Router in Protocol Independent Multicast
- Brain stimulation reward
- The British School at Rome
- Brown Student/Community Radio, Providence, RI, US
- Brussels Sound Revolution, a Belgian new beat band, best known for the single Qui? (1989).
- Building Safety Regulator a part of the Health and Safety Executive of the UK Government responsible for building safety in England
- Beijing Subway Rolling Stock Equipment, a rolling stock manufacturer based in Beijing, China
- BUCS Super Rugby, a university rugby union competition in the United Kingdom
