= Blond:ish =

Canadian DJ, producer, and activist

BLOND:ISH
- Born: October 16, 1988 (age 38); Stoney Creek, Ontario, Canada
- Origin: Montreal, Quebec, Canada
- Genres: Melodic house; Afro house; Organic house; Melodic techno; Deep house; Tech house
- Years active: 2008–present
- Labels: Kompakt; Defected; Insomniac Records; Get Physical Music; Abracadabra Music; Rebirth; Spinnin' Deep
- Past members: Anstascia D’Elene Corniere
- Website: blondish.world

Vivie-ann Bakos, born October 16, 1988, known professionally as BLOND:ISH, is a Canadian DJ, producer, and environmental activist. Known for high-energy music, she is an artist whose work focuses on inspiring change, with a stated mission to help one billion people live their best lives. She founded the nonprofit charity Bye Bye Plastic to eliminate single-use plastics from music venues and events. She is the founder of the Abracadabra event series and record label, headline resident at Pacha Ibiza, and co-founder of the nonprofit Bye Bye Plastic Foundation.

== Early life and education ==
Bakos was born in Stoney Creek, Ontario and moved to Montreal, where she studied computer science at McGill University.

== Origin ==
In 2007, Bakos formed BLOND:ISH with Anstascia D’Elene Corniere at the Winter Music Conference. The act began performing in 2008 while running and DJing a residency called Blond:ish at the Cherry Nightclub in Montreal. In 2010, BLOND:ISH moved from Montreal to London to focus more on music production and become immersed in the London music scene. While in London, they worked with veteran engineer and producer Ian Mckenzie, further refining their sound and expanding their production skills.

== Recording history ==
In 2012, BLOND:ISH released the Lonely Days EP on Noir Music. After the release of Lonely Days, the act was signed by Kompakt label boss Michael Mayer, who released the next EP, Lovers in Limbo, that same year.

In 2013, the act joined Get Physical Music, where they released their Strange Attractions EP with Thomas Gandey. As a result of their success, BLOND:ISH was commissioned to produce remixes for Depeche Mode, Pete Tong, Maya Jane Coles, Kate Simko, and WhoMadeWho.

From 2013 to 2014, the duo recorded two more Kompakt EPs, Inward Visions and Wunderkammer, from a makeshift studio near the Mayan temples in Tulum with McKenzie. From 2011 to 2023, McKenzie worked closely with BLOND:ISH as a production engineer and songwriter, contributing to various studio projects and supporting key stages of their creative development.

In 2015, BLOND:ISH released the first album, Welcome to the Present, under Kompakt.

On 16 April 2016, the act premiered their debut Essential Mix on BBC Radio 1, which they recorded in a makeshift studio in Tulum, Mexico. BLOND:ISH have released music on labels like Get Physical, Kompakt, Leftroom, and Noir. The act have also played at Burning Man.

In 2019, Corniere split from BLOND:ISH, while Bakos continued the project with Ian Mckenzie.

The single "Waves" was a Juno Award nominee for Underground Dance Single of the Year at the Juno Awards of 2022. They received a second nomination in the same category at the Juno Awards of 2023 for "Aye Aye". "Call My Name" was awarded the Underground Dance Single of the Year at the Juno Awards of 2024.

On 14 February 2025 the sophomore album Never Walk Alone was released. The album marks the first physical release for BLOND:ISH. The vinyl release features a unique component called BioVinyl, a recyclable material comparable to conventional vinyl pressing. The BioVinyl release furthers the work of charity Bye Bye Plastic, to address the use of fossil fuels in the production of vinyl records.

== Performances ==
BLOND:ISH has played festivals and events like Flying Circus, SXMusic Festival, Symbiosis Gathering, the BPM Festival, ENTER., Mysteryland, Ultra Music Festival, and Wisdom of the Glove, Echoes from Agartha, Cercle .

On 1 February 2022, it was announced that BLOND:ISH would perform at the 2022 SXM Festival on the Caribbean island of Saint Martin/Sint Maarten in March 2022.

In 2024 BLOND:ISH performed at the Yuma Tent at Coachella, Rock in Rio, and Tomorrowland festival.

On 3 December 2024, it was announced that BLOND:ISH would perform at Electric Forest in June 2025.

== Abracadabra ==
In 2017, BLOND:ISH launched her record label, brand, and event series ABRACADABRA. Under the ABRACADABRA brand they have held brand events in Miami and New York. The label hosted an ABRACADABRA stage at Tomorrowland in 2018, taking over the LEAF stage for both Saturdays of the festival. In 2020, the label launched the ABRACADABRA TV channel on Twitch to stream live music performances during the COVID-19 lockdown.

In 2025, Abracadabra held an 11-week headline residency at Pacha Ibiza, running every Wednesday from May through July. Billboard described the residency as "a landmark moment" for the venue. The residency returned for a second season in 2026. Events have also been held in Miami, New York City, Los Angeles, Tulum, Paris, Buenos Aires, and Mykonos.

== Bye Bye Plastic Foundation ==
Bakos co-founded the Bye Bye Plastic Foundation with Camille Guitteau in January 2020, along with its #PlasticFreeParty movement to promote sustainability in the music industry. The charity aims to eliminate single-use plastics from the music industry by 2025 by promoting eco-riders for artists and providing resources for promoters to encourage sustainable practices.

The organization's Eco-Rider, a sustainability clause for touring artists' performance contracts, has been adopted by more than 1,500 DJs, preventing over 325,000 single-use plastic bottles from circulation. In September 2025, Bye Bye Plastic launched the Zero Plastic Club: NYC initiative during Climate Week NYC, with the goal of eliminating 42 tons of annual plastic waste from New York's nightlife industry.

== Discography ==
=== Albums ===
Year	Title	Label	Reviews
2015	Welcome to the Present	Kompakt	
2025	Never Walk Alone	Insomniac Records	

=== Singles and EPs ===
Year	Title	Label	Reviews
2011	"Truth in Me" (feat. Ted Alexander)	Noir Music	
2012	Lonely Days EP	Noir Music	
2012	Lovers in Limbo EP	Kompakt	
2012	"In My Head"	Get Physical Music	
2013	"Island Eyes" (feat. Balcazar & Sordo)	Hot Waves	
2013	"Town Joker"	Get Physical Music	
2013	Strange Attractions EP (feat. Thomas Gandey)	Get Physical Music	
2013	Inward Visions EP	Kompakt	Resident Advisor
2014	Wunderkammer EP	Kompakt	Resident Advisor
2014	Wizard of Love EP (feat. Shawni)	Rebirth	
2015	Endless Games	Kompakt	
2021	"Waves" (featuring Grace Tither)	Spinnin' Records	
2022	"Hold Tight"	Spinnin Records	
2022	"Tra Tra"	Insomniac Records	
2022	"Sete"	Insomniac Records	
2023	"Call My Name"	Original	
2024	"Can't Let You Go" (feat. Bantu)"	Insomniac Records	
2024	"Shout It Out"	Insomniac Records	
2024	"Different Way (feat. Zeeba)"	Insomniac Records	
2024	"Never Walk Alone (feat. Stevie Appleton)"	Insomniac Records	
2024	"Higher" with Black Circle	Insomniac Records	
2024	"The Cure" (with KeeQ feat. Chloe Paige)	Defected	
2025	"Self Love"	Insomniac Records	
2026	"Be Free"	Maison Arts	

=== Remixes ===
Year	Title	Artist	Label	Reviews
2012	All In Vain (BLOND:ISH Remix)	Peter Zohdy, Michael Senna	Two Birds	
2012	Till We Die (BLOND:ISH Remix)	Tomas Barfod feat. Nina Kinert	Get Physical Music	
2012	Flash of Light (BLOND:ISH Remix)	Luca C & Brigante	Southern Fried Records	
2012	Dawn (BLOND:ISH Remix)	Pete Tong feat. S.Y.F.	Defected	
2012	In The Night (BLOND:ISH Remix)	Sivesgaard	Eklektisch	
2013	Go On Then (BLOND:ISH Remix)	Kate Simko	Leftroom	
2013	Everything (BLOND:ISH Remix)	Maya Jane Coles feat. Karin Park	I/AM/ME	
2014	Should Be Higher (BLOND:ISH Remix)	Depeche Mode	Free Track/Columbia Records	
2014	Beautiful Girl (BLOND:ISH Remix)	Junge Junge feat. Kyle Pearce	Get Physical Music	
2015	Ember (BLOND:ISH Remix)	WhoMadeWho	Get Physical Music	
2015	Sputnik (BLOND:ISH Remix)	Public Service Broadcasting	Test Card Recordings	
2019	Samba Sujo (BLOND:ISH Remix)	Born Dirty and Diplo	Higher Ground	
2019	Give Dem (BLOND:ISH Remix)	Kah-Lo and Diplo	Higher Ground	
2023	Sorry	BLOND:ISH, Madonna, Eran Hersh & Darmon	Insomniac Records	
2023	Es un secreto (Hugel Remix)	HUGEL, Dalex	Es un secreto	
2019	Mr. Grammarticalogylisationalism Boss (BLOND:ISH Remix)	Fela Kuti	Abracadabra Music	
2020	I Want to Know What Love Is (BLOND:ISH Sunrise Jungle Rework)	Foreigner	Spinnin' Deep	
2024	Fortnight (BLOND:ISH Remix)	Taylor Swift, Post Malone	Republic Records	
2025	Walking On A Dream (BLOND:ISH Remix)	Empire Of The Sun	Universal Music Australia	
2025	Natural Blues (with Kiko Franco)	Moby	Defected	
2025	Don't Cha (BLOND:ISH Remix)	The Pussycat Dolls		

=== Compilations ===
Year	Title	Label	Reviews
2014	Flying Circus Ibiza Vol. 01 Compiled by Audiofly & BLOND:ISH	Seamless Recordings	
