= Children of Chaos =

Children of Chaos may refer to:

- Children of Chaos (T99 album), 1992
- Children of Chaos (Soulidium album), 2007
