= Peter Renkens =

Belgian singer (1967–2023)

- Renkens in 1989 as member of the Confetti's
- Born: 28 July 1967
- Died: February 2023 (aged 55)
- Occupation: Singer

Peter Renkens (28 July 1967 – 14 February 2023) was a Belgian singer. He was the frontman of Confetti's.

== Music career ==
Renkens was a singer with the Belgian new beat band Confetti's which was founded in 1988. The band consisted of Renkens and four dancers. Their biggest success was The Sound Of C which achieved international acclaim. Renkens was the face of the marketing campaign, which included the single for "The Sound Of C". More commercial hits were made, including "C'Day", "C in China" and "Put 'm up". After a year of touring, during which problems arose within the band, the band disbanded in 1992. Renkens became a member of C-Mobility and later worked as a club dancer in Wuustwezel.

== Personal life ==
Renkens struggled with mental health issues since childhood and these manifested themselves during and after his time with the Confetti's. After he was diagnosed with manic-depressive disorder, he moved to a sheltered housing project where he disappeared into anonymity. During the last years of his life, he lived alone in Deurne. He died in February 2023, at the age of 55.
