= Hard NRG =

Electronic dance music genre

- Stylistic origins: Hi-NRG; Belgian techno; UK hard house; hard dance; hard trance
- Cultural origins: Mid-1990s, United Kingdom
- Typical instruments: DAW; sequencer; synthesizer (hardware); synthesizer (software); drum machine; sampler; MIDI controller; mixing desk

Other topics
- Electronic music; computer music

Hard NRG, nu-NRG, filthy hard house, or more recently just filth, is an electronic dance music genre similar in structure (with regard to sequencing and programming) to UK hard house form, taking influences from German hard trance. The main difference is in the musical/thematic content of each style.

Where UK hard house has uplifting, playfully fun and tough elements, NRG is ominous, dark, aggressive and relentless with its distressed, menacing and gritty sounds on a slightly faster BPM (155–165 average) than UK hard house (150–155 average).

In regard to the mechanics of the scene, many of the labels have made a shift from purely vinyl releases to CD single releases and digital downloads.

Record labels which produce the genre include Vicious Circle, Flashpoint, Tidy Trax, Kaktai, Tonka Trax, Tinrib Digital, Noir Records and Noir Digital.

== History ==
=== 1980s–early 1990s: Roots in UK hard house and EU techno ===
Acid house of the late 1980s was the 'happier' (playful/fun) side of dance music exemplified by Italian piano-house (Italo disco/hi-NRG of the early 1990s) and this began to progress into a scene of its own. Throughout the first half of the 1990s, house music which was more akin to the soulful, disco influenced dance music of the 1980s, continued to flourish. By the mid-1990s, uplifting house music in this vein was in abundance and producers in the UK such as The Sharp Boys were providing their own interpretation of the sound. They upped the BPMs a little, chopped up the disco samples into bite size loops, chucked a load of filters in and created music that was pure dance floor business. This was the sound that provided the basis for the origins of UK hard house. At the time, it was exclusive to the gay scene in the UK and for a while known as "Hand Bag House" or "Hard Bag". Hard house as a style was epitomized in the early days by producers such as Paul Janes, The Tidy Boys, Pete Wardman, Steve Thomas, Ian M, Alan Thompson, Captain Tinrib, DJ Ziad and Tony De Vit. Some of the above-mentioned names were heavily involved in the club night 'Trade', which is widely regarded as the home and birthplace of UK hard house with Tony De Vit as the 'godfather' of UK hard house.

In the early 1990s, producers like Joey Beltram had transposed the sound of U.S. techno to Belgium, and added their own twist to it. This new brand of techno was darker, harder, and generally nastier than anything that had preceded it. The techno that had emerged from Detroit in the US had the seemingly paradoxical quality of somehow being soulful while at the same time being 100% electronic. The Belgian techno sound ripped out this soul, and replaced it with something altogether more sinister. It was this style of music that gave birth to the sound of the "Hoover", a gritty sound produced by the Roland Alpha Juno 2 synthesizer and so called because of its apparent similarity to the noises made by vacuum cleaners.

=== Late 1990s–2000s: From nu-NRG to hard NRG ===
By 1996–97, there was a steady flow of UK-based hard house that threw away the fun and uplifting parts to incorporate the "Hoover" and other gritty, menacing sounding elements at a slightly higher tempo than the conventional hard house and thus, the style effectively became known as "nu-NRG" when Blu Peter coined the phrase in a magazine interview. Doug Osbourne (Sourmash/Razor's Edge/Illuminatae), Gordon Matthewman (DJ Edge/Illuminatae), Jon Bell (Captain Tinrib), Jon Vaughan (Jon The Dentist/Hyperspace), John Truelove (Lectrolux), Quentin Franglen (Baby Doc/Hyperspace), Owen Swinard and Dom Sweeten (OD404), Paul King, Karim, John Newell (RR Fierce), Ben Keen (BK) and Nick Sentience all had a heavy hand in shaping this sound in the UK specifically. Outside the UK, producers such as DJ Misjah (Dyewitness), Ramon Zenker (E-Trax/Phenomania/Exit EEE), Yoji Biomehanika, Commander Tom, Nuclear Hyde etc., all dabbled with the sound from time to time.

The late 1990s and early 2000s saw NRG expand a little further when the sound became even fiercer, darker and much more serious than nu-NRG. DJ Kristian then coined the phrase "hard NRG" while Jon Bell (Captain Tinrib/Dr. Base/Fierce Base), John Newell (RR Fierce/Rim 'N Chop/Fierce Base), Karim Lamouri (Karim/Rim 'N Chop) Chris Payne (Casper) and Barmak Hatamian (The Alien Thing/Max and Amino) were instrumental in the development of hard NRG.

=== 2010s–present ===
At present, nu-NRG and hard NRG is known simply as NRG throughout the scene, as it has become extremely difficult to draw a line of distinction between the two styles.
