= Lakker =

Irish electronic music act

- Origin: Dublin, Ireland
- Genres: Electronic, techno, experimental
- Years active: 2003–present
- Labels: R & S Records
- Members: Dara Smith; Ian McDonnell
- Website: lakker.com

Lakker are an Irish electronic music duo consisting of Dara Smith and Ian McDonnell, both from Dublin, Ireland. Formed in 2003, they have released a number of albums and singles on the independent Belgian electronic label R & S Records merging "IDM, new-school trip-hop, and industrial-strength techno/bass-music hybrids".

Lakker were featured on Mary Anne Hobbs' "6 Music Recommends" on BBC Radio 6 during 2014 and 2017, and on Nick Luscombe's "Late Junction" on BBC Radio 3 in March 2017.

In 2016, in combination with the Netherlands Institute for Sound and Vision, Lakker created "a new conceptual work" which was presented as an album, an interactive digital platform, and a documentary.

== Performances and workshops ==
Lakker perform live, DJ, and present audiovisual shows in Europe and North America. This includes performances at BLOC Festival, Montreal's Mutek Festival, Glade Festival, Rewire Festival, and Sonica in London in 2018. In addition to electronic music festivals, Lakker have presented works on Boiler Room TV in 2014, 2015, and 2016.

In 2015 the duo presented a workshop on Ableton for live performance at Berlin's Krake Festival. And, in 2016 Lakker presented and discussed their "Struggle & Emerge" A/V project at the Europeana Sounds Conference in Vilnius.

== Discography ==
Studio albums

- Ruido (2007)
- Tundra (2015)
- Tundra Remixed (2015)
- Struggle & Emerge (2016)
- Época (2019)
