= Children of Chaos (T99 album) =

Studio album by T99
- Released: 1992
- Recorded: 1991–1992
- Genre: Belgian techno
- Length: 1:03:40
- Label: Who's That Beat?
- Producer: Olivier Abbeloos, Patrick De Meyer

T99 chronology
| Children of Chaos (1992) | Complete Works: The Best Of T99 (2000) |

Children of Chaos is the only album by Belgian electronic duo T99, released in 1992. The follow-up was a compilation entitled Complete Works: The Best Of T99, released only in Japan in 2000. Vocals are performed by Zenon Zevenbergen, Patricia Balrak and Perla Den Boer as well as an unknown actor who appears on "Perspectivo". Album includes singles "Anasthasia", "Gardiac", "Nocturne", "Maximizor".

== Track listing ==
All tracks are written by Patrick De Meyer and Olivier Abbeloos

| No. | Title | Length |
|---|---|---|
| 1. | "Intro" | 0:31 |
| 2. | "Catwalk" | 3:15 |
| 3. | "Anasthasia" | 4:33 |
| 4. | "Maximizor" | 3:46 |
| 5. | "After Beyond" | 5:57 |
| 6. | "Gardiac" | 4:49 |
| 7. | "The Parkers" | 2:16 |
| 8. | "Nocturne" | 5:09 |
| 9. | "Perspectivo" | 0:36 |
| 10. | "The Skydreamer" | 3:59 |
| 11. | "Dogwalk" | 2:57 |
| 12. | "The Equation" | 3:52 |
| 13. | "The Skydreamer Dreams On" | 3:46 |
| 14. | "Anasthasia (House Jam Mix)" | 4:19 |
| 15. | "Catwalk (12" Remix)" | 3:54 |
| 16. | "Revenge Of The Guardian" | 4:50 |
| 17. | "Nocturne (6 O'Clock Mix)" | 4:38 |
| Total length: | | 1:03:40 |

== Trivia ==
- "Perspectivo" is actually a spoken-word art performance, not music.
- Confusingly several of the remixes on the album have alternative names:
1. "Dogwalk" is a remix of "Catwalk"
2. "The Equation" is a remix of "Maximizor" (featuring a new chorus sung by Perla Den Boer as opposed to Patricia Balrak)
3. "The Skydreamer Dreams On" is a remix of "The Skydreamer"
4. "Revenge Of The Gardian" is an instrumental version of "Gardiac"
- "Catwalk (12" Remix)" was remixed by Speedy J.
