= Kapllan Murat =

Belgian criminal of Albanian descent (born 1962)

Kapllan Murat (born Italy, May 25, 1962) is a Belgian criminal of Albanian descent. He is nicknamed "Getaway King" (le roi de l'évasion or ontsnappingskoning), for his multiple successful prison escapes. He was a driver for the notorious Haemers gang, who kidnapped former Belgian Prime Minister Paul Vanden Boeynants in 1989.

== Personal life ==
Together with his parents, who were UN refugees from Albania, Murat came to Belgium. He was already a delinquent in his youth. In 1980, he was imprisoned for a fight, whereby one person was killed, and multiple others were wounded.

Murat graduated as a baker after completing a prison course in 2007.

== Criminal career ==
On May 5, 1993, Murat escaped from the Saint-Gilles prison, with two Haemers gang members, Philippe Lacroix and Basri Bajrami. After a riot had erupted in the prison, they managed to hold four prison guards hostage using handguns and hand grenades. They demanded that a stolen BMW be driven inside the prison-gates, which then would be used as an escape vehicle. They tied one prison guard to the roof of the car, Harry Van Oers, the prison director, and two more prison guards were put in the car as well. The Belgian Gendarmerie could do nothing but watch the convicted men flee the scene in the BMW. More than 200 police officers were used to quell the prison riot afterwards. The hostages were all released that same night. Three days later, Murat was caught by a routine traffic control.

In 2003, Murat was released on parole, after having spent 15 years of his 19 years sentence, even though the justice minister of that time, Marc Verwilghen, had provided a negative advice for this. In 2004, he was jailed again for stealing CDs, but he was released the next day, under dismay by justice minister Verwilghen.

Murat was caught red-handed in 2005, when burgling a store in Londerzeel. He was shot down by a police officer, after Murat pulled a loaded weapon. He is not yet sentenced for this crime.

On July 16, 2006, Murat did not return from a weekend parole. The next day, the police found him hiding in a do-it-yourself store. The police surrounded the store, but Murat was nowhere to be found. The justice minister, Laurette Onkelinx, from the Parti Socialiste, was under heavy criticism from the political opposition parties, because she had signed Kapllan's leave.

Kapllan Murat was arrested on July 28, 2006, in the Belgian city of Dilbeek, accompanied by his girlfriend.

On July 2, 2008, Murat left the prison of Nivelles, after being granted a conditional early release. He said he was "turning a page" and "would not return to criminality". For the next seven and a half years, he is to remain at the disposal of the authorities.
