= Paula Temple =

British techno DJ and producer

Paula Temple is a British techno DJ and producer born in Manchester. She has performed under the name Jaguar Woman and runs the Noise Manifesto label. Her live sets have been described as "blurring the line between DJing and producing," layering in samples, editing and remixing on the fly, a technique that "brings depth and intensity" to her sound and making the sets "unique".

== Biography ==
=== Childhood and musical beginnings ===
Born in Manchester, Paula Temple grew up in Preston. She began producing music as a teenager, working for Action Records, a chain of specialist record shops, until her DJ work enabled her to devote herself to music full-time]. In 2002, Paula Temple published her first EP, The Speck Of The Future on Chris McCormack's Material label, in Sheffield where she lived for four years.

=== Withdrawal from performance ===
Faced with the misogyny of the music industry, Paula Temple withdrew from the scene and did not release any new material between 2003 and 2011. She then devoted herself to the development of electronic machines, in particular developing a MIDI controller with a crossfader, the MXF8, which made it possible to make music with a computer and eight turntables. In 2006, she gave training courses in Ableton music production software throughout the UK

=== Return to music ===
Since 2012, Paula Temple has been living in Berlin and back on the live circuit. In 2013, she released Colonized on R&S Records. In 2014 she released the Deathvox EP and then Oscillate in 2015 on the Modeselektor label.

Paula Temple founded her own label Noise Manifesto in 2015, on which she ensures that 50% of the artists represented are women or trans. On 3 May 2019, after a career spanning more than 15 years, she released her first album on the label, Edge Of Everything. The album, featuring twelve tracks of industrial techno, was described as critical of unscrupulous managers and an archaic vertical hierarchy.

With her label, she produces the collective music project Decon/Recon, where each track is released anonymously.

== Discography ==
=== EP ===
- 2002 : The Speck Of The Future - Materials
- 2013 : Colonized - R&S Records
- 2014 : Deathvox - R&S Records
- 2015 : Oscillate - Modeselektor

=== Album ===
- 2019 : Edge Of Everything - Noise Manifesto
