= Lindisfarne / Unluck =

2011 single by James Blake

Single by James Blake

from the album James Blake
- Released: 16 June 2011
- Recorded: 2010
- Genre: Electronica, experimental, art pop
- Length: 6:54
- Label: Polydor Records
- Songwriter(s): James Blake, Rob McAndrews
- Producer(s): James Blake

James Blake singles chronology
"The Wilhelm Scream" (2011)	"Lindisfarne / Unluck" (2011)	"Order / Pan" (2011)

"Lindisfarne / Unluck" is a double A-side single by English dubstep producer and singer-songwriter James Blake, released as the third single from his self-titled debut album. The single was released as a digital download on the iTunes Store on 16 June 2011 and on 10" vinyl the following day.

== Song information ==
=== Lindisfarne ===
"Lindisfarne" shows elements of folktronica, trip hop, and soul music. It has extensive use of auto-tune, vocoders and multi-layered vocals over acoustic guitar playing.

On the album, the song is split up into 2 parts; "Lindisfarne I" and "Lindisfarne II". On the single, the two are combined into one shortened track, "Lindisfarne (Edit)"

=== Unluck ===
"Unluck" is an electronic song that brings out elements of IDM, trip hop, and post-dubstep. It is in the same form as it is on the album.

== Music video ==
A music video was released for "Lindisfarne (Edit)" to Blake's VEVO page on YouTube. As of 18 September 2019, the music video has 1,166,506 views.

There was no video released for "Unluck".

== Track listing ==
No.	Title	Writer(s)	Length
1.	"Lindisfarne" (Edit)	James Blake, Rob McAndrews	3:51
2.	"Unluck"	J. Blake	3:03
Total length:			6:54

== Personnel ==
Credits adapted from Discogs.

=== Song ===
- James Blake – songwriting, production
- Rob McAndrews – acoustic guitar and songwriting on "Lindisfarne (Edit)"

=== Artwork ===
- Helen Litherland – artwork
- Alexander Brown – design

=== Music video ===
- Martin De Thura – director
