= CMYK (EP) =

EP by James Blake
- Released: 28 May 2010
- Recorded: 2010 in James Blake's home
- Genre: UK bass; post-dubstep; electronic pop
- Length: 15:55
- Label: R&S
- Producer: James Blake

James Blake chronology
The Bells Sketch (2010)	CMYK (2010)	Klavierwerke (2010)

CMYK is the second solo extended play by English singer-songwriter James Blake. It was released in both the United Kingdom and the United States on R&S Records on 28 May 2010. It samples many tracks, mostly from 1990s R&B. The EP received positive reviews from critics.

== Composition ==
The title track samples Kelis' "Caught Out There" and Aaliyah's "Are You That Somebody?". Pitchfork described the track as "modern homage to old ideas" as Blake "[took] two R&B archetypes ... and imagines them in a back and forth." On the track, Blake sings normally and also occasionally uses a vocoder to process his voice. The track is influenced by 1990s rave pop and also contains synthesizers. The following song, "Footnotes" also has Blake using the vocoder, but the song is hymnal and contains "gospel chords". It is a minimalistic track; it uses slight noises to create an "atmospheric" sound.

The next song "I'll Stay" has been described as the "warmest, most accessible track of [CMYK]". It is also hymnal, but it contains a call and response with repeated, high-pitched synthesizers. The final track, "Postpone" has been likened to a "lumbering requiem before transforming into lumbering exultation." It features electronic beats, "hip hop choruses", and "triumphant" horns.

== Reception ==
Professional ratings
Review scores
Source	Rating
Fact	4/5
Pitchfork	8.3/10
Resident Advisor	4.0/5

The EP received generally positive reviews from music critics. Mike Powell of Pitchfork complimented how Blake used the samples in his music, and gave the EP a score of 8.3 out of 10. Fact named "Postpone" as the highlight of CMYK, and called the EP "the most anthemic thing Blake's done to date." In the review, the EP received 4 out of 5 "records", and the reviewer stated that he was "sold [on Blake's music]."

Sam Louis of Resident Advisor gave CMYK 4 out of 5 stars and stated that "Blake underpins nearly everything here with those comfortable blankets, wrapping you up while he makes you consider dancing." He also wrote "[Blake] clearly also knows that a little bit of subtlety can go a long way", and that "[his songs are] just as emotionally affecting, squeezing pathos out a single line from Kelis and warm, deep chords." Pitchfork later named CMYK the eighth best album of the year, along with The Bells Sketch EP and Klavierwerke EP; the website applauded how Blake released so much material in a year. It also included "CMYK" on its list of the 200 Best Songs of the 2010s.

== Track listing ==
All tracks are written by James Blake.

No.	Title	Length
1.	"CMYK"	3:39
2.	"Footnotes"	4:47
3.	"I'll Stay"	3:49
4.	"Postpone"	3:40

== Personnel ==
- James Blake – writing, production
- Matt Colton – mastering

== Charts ==
Chart (2011)	Peak position
UK Physical Singles Chart (Official Charts Company)	49
