= Confetti's =

Belgian new beat band

- Confetti's in 1989

Background information
- Origin: Belgium
- Genres: New beat, house
- Years active: 1988–1991
- Label: USA Import Music
- Members: Geert Tanghe; Sophie
- Past members: Peter Renkens; Marleen; Tania; Hilde; Daniëlla

Confetti's was a Belgian new beat band from the 1980s. Its producers were Serge Ramaekers and Dominique Sas, sometimes credited as The Maxx. On stage, Confetti's was fronted by singer Peter Renkens and female dancers Marleen, Tania, Hilde and Daniëlla. Their most popular songs included "The Sound of C" and "C in China". One year after releasing their last single "Put ‘M Up" in 1990, the original setting of Confetti's withdrew from the spotlight.

At the beginning of 2009, the act was revived as a tribute act under the adapted name 'The Confettis', with the artist who was the inspiration for the group and founder of the new beat dance, namely Geert Tanghe, former European champion mime and robotic dancer. At the time, he had already been asked for the group and had made a persiflage under the name "Serpentins" on various new beat underground acts that had been set up in the 1980s. With this, he had success and the video of his tournée was used several times as inspiration of the first Confetti occupation. He himself was professionally active in the development of a futuristic act, first under the name Man Machine with singles "UFO", "IFO" and "The Best Ever Seen". Later he developed Laserman with singles including "Technology" and "One Two" and toured with this act worldwide.

Geert took the act along with his partner Sophie, collaborating first with USA Import Music and later with La Musique du Beau Monde. In 2014, a remix single of "The Sound of C" was released with a re-use by X-Tof and in 2018, together with original producer Serge Ramaekers, a total remake single was made that was both integrated by the Confettis in every show.

In 2019, the concept had an expansion under the name the Confettis 2.0. Both Geert and Sophie now bring the songs together vocally, and by moving the singer / dancer to the forefront, the act is capable of performing as a party act showcasing the evolution of music from the 1980s to the 1990s with the Confettis as a central theme.

== "The Sound of C" ==
Their first release, "The Sound of C" stands for the Belgian club Confetti's in Brasschaat, near Antwerp. Serge Ramaekers and Dominique Sas were working on a marketing campaign to gain more publicity for the club. One of the barmen at Confetti's (Peter Renkens) became the face of the marketing campaign, which included the single "The Sound of C". To shoot a music video, the band was dropped at the main shopping street in Antwerp De Meir and performed "The Sound of C" in front of hundred citizens passing by. Due to the success of the first single, a live act was put together and Confetti's traveled the world to promote their new beat music. On stage, singer Peter always wore a captain's uniform. The dress code for new beat was black and white clothes combined with bright, colorful, even childish fashion accessories. In 1989, they released their only album, 92… Our First Album. Renkens' uniform was later changed to that of a Canadian Mountie.

== Discography ==
=== Albums ===
- 92…Our First Album (1989)

=== Singles ===
Year	Single	Peak positions				Album
Year	Single	BEL (FLA)	NED	FRA	ES	Album
1988	"The Sound of C"	20	23	6	3	92... Our First Album
1988	"C in China"	8	83	7	—	92... Our First Album
1989	"C Day"	2	8	5	—	92... Our First Album
1989	"Keep Smiling / C Countdown"	15	33	—	—	92... Our First Album
1989	"Circling Stars (Jingle Bells)"	5	91	19	—	Singles only
1990	"Megamix"	11	28	12	—	Singles only
1990	"Put'm Up (Your Hands)"	7	—	26	—	Singles only
"—" denotes releases that did not chart or were not released.
