= Cozmic Jam =

Studio album by Quadrophonia
- Released: 1991
- Length: 44:49
- Label: Universal Music Belgium

Professional ratings
Review scores
Source	Rating
AllMusic	3/5 stars

Cozmic Jam is an album by Dutch/Belgian electronic music collective Quadrophonia.

== Track listing ==
1. "Quadrophonia"
2. "The Man with the Masterplan"
3. "Djoum 1000"
4. "Hardhead"
5. "Cozmic Jam"
6. "Find the Time (Part I)"
7. "Schizofrenia - The Worst Day of My Life"
8. "The Wave of the Future"
9. "Original Statement"
10. "Cozm' and Ovo"
11. "Quadrophonia (Remix)"
12. "The 9 Lives of Pitou"
13. "Find the Time (Part II)"
14. "Theme of Quadrophonia"

== Charts ==
Chart performance for Cozmic Jam
Chart (1991)	Peak position
Australian Albums (ARIA)	93
