= The Sound of Belgium =

- Directed by: Jozef Devillé
- Written by: Jozef Devillé; Pablo Eekman
- Produced by: Steven Dhoedt; Gert van Berckelaer
- Starring: John Flanders (Narrator)
- Cinematography: Jozef Devillé
- Edited by: Jozef Devillé; Gert van Berckelaer
- Production company: Visualantics
- Distributed by: Media+
- Release date: 19 October 2012
- Running time: 85 minutes
- Country: Belgium
- Languages: Dutch; French

The Sound of Belgium is a 2012 Belgian documentary film directed by Jozef Devillé and produced by independent Belgian production company Visualantics.

The film had its world premiere on 19 October 2012 at the Flanders International Film Festival Ghent.

The film is entirely spoken in Dutch and French, but English subtitles are shown. It was featured at the Cork International Film Festival on 8 November 2014 in Cork, Ireland and the IN-EDIT film festival in Greece on 22 February 2015. It was nominated for Best Documentary Film at the 2013 Magritte Awards.

== Synopsis ==
In the 2010 documentary "The Sound of Belgium" a production of Visualantics. Produced by Steven Dhoedt and Gert van Berckelaer and written by Jozef Deville and Pablo Eekman, the movie explores the rich and untold story of Belgian electronic dance music. The movie takes a trip through time from the grand dance halls with Decap organs to the gold days of Popcorn. It covers cold electronic body music and new beat to Belgian house and techno music. The film offers an alternative perspective while showcasing the country's unique popular music. Narrated by John Flanders, the film looks to understand the spirit of a nation, the historical driving force behind its dance movement, its music and the people who danced to it.

== See also ==
- Cinema of Belgium
