= Brussels Sound Revolution =

Belgian band

Brussels Sound Revolution was a Belgian new beat band who had a novelty song hit in their home country with the 45 tours single Qui...? (1989), which featured samples of the speech Belgian former Prime Minister Paul Vanden Boeynants gave after he had been kidnapped by the gang of Patrick Haemers that year.

== History ==
Brussels Sound Revolution was a project by Paul Denoy, the former bass player of the bands Marine, Snowy Red and La Muerte, and producer Jacky Maurer. The group released one single, Qui...? based on the kidnapping of Paul Vanden Boeynants on January 14, 1989. After a month, on February 13, the kidnappers, Patrick Haemers, Philippe Lacroix, Kapllan Murat, Marc Van Dam and Denise Tyack were arrested and Vanden Boeynants was freed without severe harm. He organized a press conference in which he explained what happened during his kidnapping, mentioning that he was angry when his trademark pipe had been stolen, leading to the question: Qui m'a enlevé ma pipe? (Who has taken my pipe?). Denoy and Maurer felt it would be funny to sample parts of Vanden Boeynants' speech and make a song about it in the style of the internationally popular new beat genre. They named their group Brussels Sound Revolution, which shared the same initials as the Brigade Spéciales de Recherche, the police corps who arrested the criminals. The song was called Qui...?, after the recurring refrain. It became a hit in Belgium, received its own music video and sold over 50.000 copies. Vanden Boeynants let the song be, but still asked publicity rights through his lawyer.

Brussels Sound Revolution also recorded a song called C'est Moi, which sampled parts of Patrick Haemers' press conference speech, but this was not a success.

== Discography ==
- Pump Up The Twist (1989) (A remix of various twist songs, such as The Twist, Surfin' Bird and Be-Bop-A-Lula).
- Qui...? (1989)
- La Danse des Canards/ De Vogeltjesdans (1990) (A remix of the Chicken Dance)

== See also ==
- Qui...?
