= Frank De Wulf =

Belgian musician

Frank De Wulf (born 1968) is a Belgian DJ, musician and record label owner. He is considered one of the pioneers of the Belgian new beat and techno scene.

== Life and career ==
Frank De Wulf was born in 1968 as the youngest of three sons. His brothers introduced him to new music and soon he started to create his first tape mixes.

In the 1980s, he had his own radio show, Seventh Heaven Radio. In 1985, he began working for SIS radio.

He also had his first jobs as resident DJ in two clubs in Gent. When New Beat became popular in Belgium around 1988 De Wulf started to produce his own tracks. One of his first hits was the 12" Acid Rock which he released with his project Rhythm Device on Music Man Records. He also released the first of his B-Sides with unfinished beats and samples, which became very popular among DJs.

Together with other musicians he founded projects such as Bass Jumpers, F.O.G., Liaisons D, Dow Jones (later renamed Sounds In Order for legal reasons), and Rhythm Device. As remixer he worked on tracks by Digital Boy, Santa Esmeralda, Jam & Spoon, Erasure, The Orb, The Shamen, Model 500, Biosphere, Ken Ishii and Celvin Rotane.

De Wulf also founded his own record labels Mikki House and Two Thumbs.

At the end of the 1990s De Wulf withdraw from the music business and focused on his visual effects studio GRID.

== Selected discography ==
=== Albums ===
- 1990: Frank De Wulf – The B-Sides Volume One And Two (Music Man Records, compilation)
- 1990: Modular Expansion – Unit 1 & Unit 2 (Music Man Records)
- 1991: Frank De Wulf – The First 3 Years (Mikki House, compilation, DJ mix)

=== Singles and EPs ===
- 1989: In Full Effect – And The World Knows That (Brother Bear Records)
- 1989: Kris Kastaar / Frank De Wulf – KK Mix Volume One / Compression (Music Man Records)
- 1989: Frank De Wulf – D.W.F. Mix (Volume 1) (Music Man Records)
- 1990: Modular Expansion – Unit 1 (Music Man Records)
- 1990: Modular Expansion – Unit 2 (Music Man Records)
- 1990: FX. – Tape Path (Mikki House)
- 1990: Second Chance – Hard Up (Music Man Records)
- 1990: Frank De Wulf / Sherman – D.W.F. Mix 2 / B-Sides Mix (Music Man Records)
- 1990: Frank De Wulf – The B-Sides Volume One (Music Man Records)
- 1990: Frank De Wulf – The B-Sides Remixed (Music Man Records)
- 1990: Frank De Wulf – The B-Sides Volume Two (Music Man Records)
- 1990: Frank De Wulf – The B-Sides Volume Three (Music Man Records)
- 1990: Frank De Wulf – The B-Sides Volume Four (Music Man Records)
- 1991: Crash – Crash (Streetbeats)
- 1992: Frank De Wulf – Beyond The B-Sides (Music Man Records)
- 1992: Modular Expansion – Cubes (Flarenasch )
- 1992: Bhab & Cas – Two Thumbs (Mikki House)
- 1992: Bhab & Cas – Two Thumbs II (Two Thumbs)
- 1992: Two Thumbs – Two Thumbs III (Two Thumbs)
- 1992: Two Thumbs – Two Thumbs IV (Two Thumbs)
- 1992: Frank De Wulf – Wishflower (Mikki House)
- 1993: Arena – Calor (Two Thumbs)
- 1993: In Full Effect – Inside Out (Two Thumbs)
- 1993: Frank De Wulf – People in Motion (Two Thumbs)
- 1993: Frank De Wulf – People in Motion II (Two Thumbs)
- 1994: Frank De Wulf vs. T-Quest – Play (R&S Records)
- 1994: Cerpent – Class One / Class Two (Growth)
- 1995: Cerpent – Pacific (Growth)
- 1995: Frank De Wulf / Hardfloor – Dark Hearts 2 (Harthouse)
- 1995: Frank De Wulf – Drums in a Grip (Harthouse)
- 1995: Sunstone – Pianohell / Deep And Refreshing (Tribal Sun)
- 1995: Sunstone – Pianohell 2 / Midas-beats (Tribal Sun)
- 1995: Sunstone – Skyline / Razorblade (Tribal Sun)
- 1996: Bypass – Zero Return (Bonzai Records)
- 1997: Frank De Wulf – Spinal Tap (Generations)
- 1999: Catella – Drums on a Roll (Music Man Records)
- 2010: Frank De Wulf – The B-Sides Volume Five (B-Sides)
- 2011: Frank De Wulf / DJ HMC – People in Motion / Life Support Systems (Darkroom Dubs)
