= Vondelpark (band) =

English indie pop group

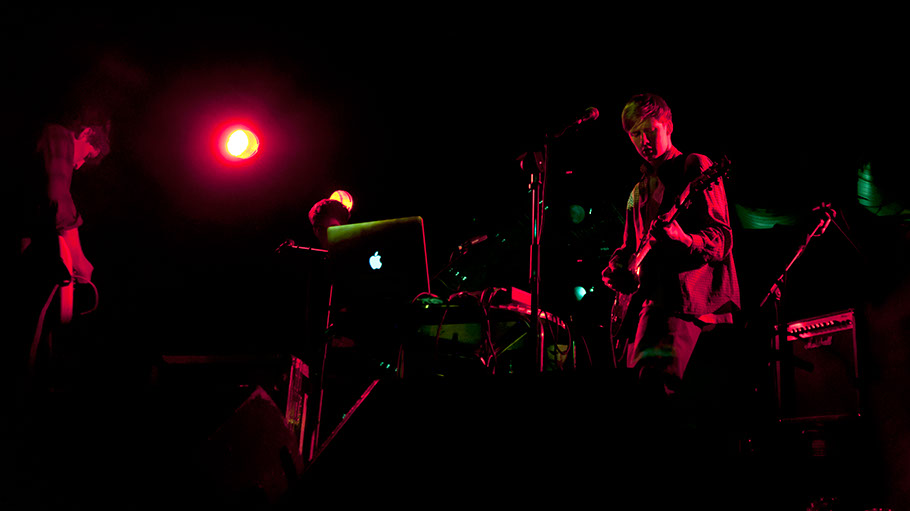
- Vondelpark performing at the Arches, Glasgow in 2011

Background information
- Origin: London, England
- Genres: Indie pop, dream pop, R&B, electronica, ambient, synthpop
- Years active: 2010–2016, 2022
- Label: R&S
- Members: Lewis Rainsbury; Alex Bailey; Matthew Lawrenson
- Website: vondelparkmusic.com

Vondelpark were an English indie pop group, formed in 2010 in London, England. The band consists of Lewis Rainsbury, Alex Bailey and Matthew Lawrenson. The band is named after the public park of the same name.

After signing to R&S Records, the band released their first EP, Sauna in 2010. The band's second EP, NYC Stuff And NYC Bags was released in 2011. This was followed by their third release, Dracula EP in 2012. The band's debut album, Seabed, was released on 1 April 2013 and reached number 18 in the UK Independent Album Breakers Chart.

On 20 January 2016, Vondelpark wrote on Facebook that band was split up. Despite that, on 16 November 2022, the band released a new single titled "Greenish" via Spotify on which all three original members are credited.

== Musical style ==
The band's music includes elements from various genres such as indie pop, dream pop, contemporary R&B, ambient, synthpop, soft rock, dubstep, and UK bass. The band draw inspiration from various musical acts such as Motown artists, Robert Glasper, Arthur Russell, Barry White, Herbie Hancock, and Dexter Wansel. The band was also compared to numerous alternative and R&B acts, such as My Bloody Valentine, The xx, New Order, The Cure, Ariel Pink, Drake and The Weeknd. The band described their musical style as "Radiohead quietstorm."

== Members ==
- Lewis Rainsbury - production, vocals, guitar, bass, programming, electronics, synths (2010–2016)
- Alex Bailey - guitar, bass (2010–2016)
- Matthew Lawrenson - production, keyboards, synths, backing vocals (2010–2016)

== Discography ==
=== Studio albums ===
- Seabed (2013, R&S Records)

=== EPs ===
- Sauna EP (2010, R&S Records)
- NYC Stuff And NYC Bags EP (2011, R&S Records)
- Dracula EP (2012, R&S Records)
- Seabed Remixed (2014, R&S Records)

=== Singles ===
- "Dracula" (2013, R&S Records)
- "California Analog Dream" (2013, R&S Records)
- "Greenish" (2022)
