= The Wilhelm Scream =

Single by James Blake

from the album James Blake
- Released: 3 March 2011
- Recorded: 2010
- Genre: Electronic; post-dubstep
- Length: 4:36
- Label: Polydor
- Songwriters: James Litherland; James Blake
- Producer: James Blake

James Blake singles chronology
"Limit to Your Love" (2010)	"The Wilhelm Scream" (2011)	"Lindisfarne / Unluck" (2011)

"The Wilhelm Scream" is a song by English musician James Blake, released on his self-titled debut studio album. It is a cover of the song "Where to Turn" by Blake's father, James Litherland. The single was released in the United Kingdom on 3 March 2011, and debuted on the UK Singles Chart at number 136. The cover version was retitled after the Wilhelm scream, a sound effect used in numerous movies. The single was used during the end credits of the HBO series Entourage.

== Critical reception ==
Mayer Nissim of Digital Spy gave the song a positive review stating:

As Blake's voice veers between an almost robotic coldness and grasping attempts at connection, the stripped-out backing plays around with space as much as it does notes. They key stuff happens from about two minutes in, as layers build in crashing waves of ambient terror until you find your teeth grinding and eyes welling up... before it all drops out again.

Pitchfork ranked this song 11th in their end of year list.

In January 2012, it was announced that Triple J listeners had voted "The Wilhelm Scream" number 92 in the 2011 Hottest 100. Additionally, the song earned Blake an Ivor Award nomination.

== Track listing ==
Digital download
No.	Title	Length
1.	"The Wilhelm Scream"	4:36
2.	"What Was It You Said About Luck"	2:20
3.	"Half Heat Full (Old Circular)*" (*12" single only)	2:12
4.	"The Wilhelm Scream" (Music video)	4:37

== Charts ==
Chart (2011)	Peak Position
Belgium (Ultratip Bubbling Under Flanders)	14
Belgium (Ultratip Bubbling Under Wallonia)	32
UK Singles (The Official Charts Company)	136

== Release history ==
Region	Date	Format	Label
United Kingdom	3 March 2011	Digital download	Polydor
