= Hoover sound =

Waveform used in electronic music

The famous Dominator "hoover sound" first heard unaltered, then put through a phaser effect and the EG Attack levels altered.

In electronic music, the Hoover sound is a synthesizer sound commonly used in rave techno, hardcore techno, gabber, breakbeat hardcore, trance, hard house and hard NRG. Originally called the "Mentasm", the name that stuck was the one likening the sound to that of a vacuum cleaner (often referred to via the genericized trademark "hoover" in the UK and Ireland).

== The sound ==
The Hoover is a complex waveform that can be created with three oscillators, each spaced an octave apart, a heavy use of pulse-width modulation and a thick chorus effect. The sound is characterised by its thick swirliness that stems from a fast LFO controlling the PWM and the chorus. It was originally created by Eric Persing for the Roland Alpha Juno, although the term 'hoover' was not introduced by him.

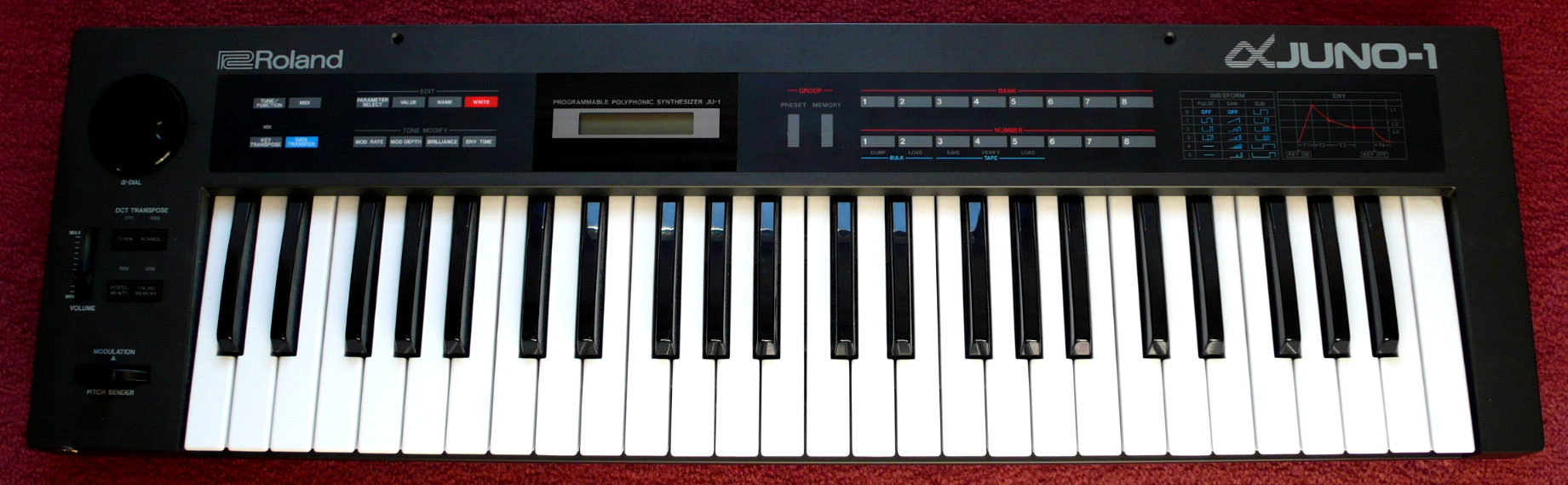
The archetypal 'hoover' synth, Roland Alpha Juno

It is traditionally created with the Roland Alpha Juno-2, Alpha Juno 1, or rack mount version MKS-50 synthesizer using the built-in What the patch. The hoover sound generated on these synthesizers is unique for the use of a "PWM" sawtooth wave, which inserts flat segments of variable width into a sawtooth waveform.

== History and popularization ==
The hoover sound is believed to first have appeared in a commercial production in "Mentasm" by Second Phase (1991), produced in a collaboration between Joey Beltram and Mundo Muzique, and sometimes is referred to as a "mentasm". However, mentasm normally refers to the sound sampled from this tune and re-used. This sound was widely used in Belgian techno tracks of the early 1990s.

Another notable example of a record using a hoover sound is "Dominator" by Dutch techno pioneers Human Resource. This track gained fame in 1991 and became a top 10 hit worldwide. Characteristic for this track was not only the hoover, but also the over-the-top rap: "I'm bigger and bolder and rougher and tougher, in other words, sucker, there is no other... I'm the one and only dominator... Wanna kiss myself!"

The sound has also been used in video games such as Streets of Rage 3, which was composed by Yuzo Koshiro and Motohiro Kawashima, and Robotron X by Aubrey Hodges.

== Works featuring the hoover sound ==
Title	Artist	Year	Source
Acid Pandemonium	Mundo Muzique	1991	
Dominator	Human Resource	1991	
Charly (Alley Cat Mix)	The Prodigy	1991	
Mentasm	Second Phase	1991	
Cactus Rhythm	Plexus	1991	
Inssomniak	DJPC	1991	
Anasthasia	T99	1991	
Tingler	Smart Systems	1991	
Fractal	Brainstorm	1991	
S.H.U.M.	Jessie Deep!	1992	
Fury	Underground Resistance	1992	
Kamikaze	DJ NRG	1993	
Ectoplasm	The Time Frequency	1994	
Are You All Ready?	Tony De Vit	1996	
Thunder	Dom & Roland	1998	
Looking Good	Lisa Lashes	1999	
DJ Gollum & DJ Yanny	Shithead	2000	
What!	Eufex	2000	
Hoover Time	Stimulant DJs	2000	
Warp 1.9	The Bloody Beetroots	2009	
Bad Romance	Lady Gaga	2009	
Birthday Cake	Rihanna	2011	
Doomsday	Nero	2011	
Something New	Girls Aloud	2012	
I Fink U Freeky	Die Antwoord	2012	
Fashion Is My Kryptonite	Bella Thorne and Zendaya	2012	
Phresh Out the Runway	Rihanna	2012	
Hatshepsut	Jlin	2017	
WOOWA	DIA	2019	
Back in the Game	Battle Tapes	2023	
Generator	Justice	2024	
Abracadabra	Lady Gaga	2025	
Pretty Ugly	Zara Larsson	2025	
