= Quadrophonia =

Dutch/Belgian musical group

Quadrophonia were a Dutch/Belgian Techno music collective, formed by Olivier Abbeloos (also known as part of T99) and Lucien Foort in the late 1980s, with several of their tracks performed by Marvin D (Marvin Tholen).

They had two top 40 hits in the United Kingdom. "Quadrophonia", which reached #14 in April 1991, followed by "The Wave of the Future", which charted at number 40 in July of the same year. Three of their other singles were "Find the Time (Part 1)", "Schizofrenia – The Worst Day of My Life" and "The Man with the Masterplan", all three of which were not successful. Later in the year the group released their album, Cozmic Jam. Following their work in 1991 and 1992, Quadrophonia went on to release three more singles in 1993. They were "Intergalactic Crosstalk (Amazonia)", "Moondance" and "Warp Factor One"; as well as a couple of remix singles in 1997 and 1998, called "Quadrophonia '97 (Remixes Part 1)" and "Quadrophonia '98 (Remixes Part 2)". In 2025, Quadrophonia released an album in 2025 that had been made in 1993, just never released, named Warp Factor 1 On Lunar Acid.

Quadrophonia also recorded under the aliases CMOS, Holographic Hallucination, and Warp Factor 1 (as well as Orion on one white label release).

Marvin D ultimately introduced his friend Ray Slijngaard to Phil Wilde and Jean-Paul de Coster, who together with Anita Doth later formed 2 Unlimited.

== Discography ==
=== Studio albums ===
List of albums, with selected details and chart positions
Title	Album details	Peak chart positions
Title	Album details	AUS
Cozmic Jam	Released: 1991; Label: ARS	93
Warp Factor 1 On Lunar Acid	Released: 2025; Label: Nocturbulous	—

=== Charted singles ===
List of charted singles, with selected chart positions
Title	Year	Peak chart positions					Album
Title	Year	NLD	AUS	GER	SWI	UK	Album
"Quadrophonia"	1991	12	73	32	—	14	Cozmic Jam
"The Wave of the Future"	1991	45	83	—	26	40	Cozmic Jam
"Find the Time (Part 1)"	1991	—	—	—	—	41	Cozmic Jam
"The Man with the Mastermixes"	1992	—	145	—	—	—	

=== Other singles ===
- "Schizofrenia – The Worst Day of My Life" (1991)
- "The Man with the Master Mixes" ("The Man With the Masterplan") (1992)
- "Intergalactic Crosstalk (Amazonia)" (1993)
- "Moondance" (1993)
- "Warp Factor One" (1993)
- "Encounters of the Underground" (1993) – released as Holographic Hallucination
- "Dark Tales of X-Perimental Madness" (1993) – released as Holographic Hallucination
- "Hypno" (1994) – released as Holographic Hallucination
- "Care 4 Me" (1994) – released as Warp Factor 1
- "People (Don't Make Me Wait)" (1994) – Released as Warp Factor 1
- "Warp Factor One" (1995) – released as CMOS (note: This is a different single from the previous "Warp Factor One" single the group released under their Quadrophonia name)
- "Quadrophonia '97 (Remixes Part 1)" (1997)
- "Quadrophonia '98 (Remixes Part 2)" (1998)
