= Untold (musician) =

British musician

- Born: Jack Dunning
- Genres: Electronic
- Occupations: Music producer, musician
- Years active: 2008–present
- Members: Jack Dunning

Untold a.k.a. Jack Dunning, is an electronic producer from London. He released his first solo record on Hessle Audio in 2008 and has since released on R&S Records, Soul Jazz, Clone Records and more. He released his debut album 'Black Light Spiral' on his own label, Hemlock Recordings in February 2014.

== History ==
Untold's first solo release was Kingdom on Hessle Audio in March 2008. The release also featured Purify and Test Signal and was described by Resident Advisor as "an excellent debut, and one that is sure to go down well with people who delight in the constantly evolving nature of the genre."

He followed that with Yukon / Walk Through Walls on his own Hemlock imprint which gained a 4/5 review from Resident Advisor . Untold then followed this with Discipline / Bones, also on Hemlock.

These were followed with his first release for Hotflush Recordings, run by the producer Scuba, in March 2009. Entitled Sweat the single also featured the B Side Dante.

He also remixed Ramadanman's 'Revenue' in 2009 for 2nd Drop Records.

Untold then returned to Hessle Audio to release I Can't Stop This Feeling / Anaconda to which XLR8R claimed he "was breathing new life" into Dubstep.

Further releases followed including Flexible on Brainmath Recordings as well as a return to Hotflush for Just For You which also featured a Roska remix.

=== Gonna Work Out Fine EP ===
Untold's most comprehensive release to date was 2009's Gonna Work Out Fine EP released on Hemlock Recordings. Comprising 6 tracks, the EP was released on triple vinyl. Pitchfork praised his ability to balance "fluency with austerity; he knows which details bring depth and which distract."

Track listing:

1. Gonna Work Out Fine
2. Stop What You're Doing
3. Don't Know. Don't Care
4. Palamino
5. No One Likes A Smart-Arse
6. Never Went Away

=== 2010 – 2011 ===
In 2010 Untold released two collaborations. The first, "Beacon", was a joint effort with Hyperdub's LV and was released on Hemlock Recordings featuring a remix from Mount Kimbie. The second was a collaboration with Roska and Untold's debut on the Glasgow-based label Numbers. Featuring the tracks Myth and Long Range, Resident Advisor praised the releases' ability to "take well-worn tropes and flip them on their heads".

Dunning also made 2 other label debuts in 2010, on Soul Jazz and R&S Records respectively. As part of the former's Future Bass compilation, Untold released the double A side Come Follow Me / Fly Girls as the second single from the compilation.

Untold followed this up later in the year by working with the Electronic label R&S Records. Previously home to such artists as Aphex Twin and Model 500, Untold delivered Stereo Freeze / Mass Dreams of the Future to the newly active label.

2011 saw Dunning further cemented his association with the House and Techno scene, teaming up with the Dutch label Clone Records for a release on their Basement Series.

=== Change in a Dynamic Environment ===
Dunning's latest project marks a return to his own Hemlock Recordings for the first time since 2009. Change in a Dynamic Environment is a 3 part EP featuring 3 separate single releases. The first Motion The Dance / Luminous was released in April and the second Caslon / Breathe in June, with the third set to follow in July.

Dunning claims his aim is to "come back and make a statement". Resident Advisor awarded the second part 4.5/5 in their review.

=== Black Light Spiral ===
Black Light Spiral, released in February 2014, is Untold's first album released on Hemlock records. The album received a 7.6 rating on the music website Pitchfork, a rating of 9/10 on music website Spin (Album of the month), 4/5 on FACT magazine, 4/5 from Resident Advisor and 8/10 from XLR8R. Pitchfork commended Dunning for 'pushing his sound in a fresh direction', while SPIN claimed 'There is no album this year with a better handle on how to create and maintain tension".

== Live ==
Untold has toured the world extensively as a DJ. In 2010 he combined numerous European shows with a tours of Australia and Russia, as well as a visit to Puerto Rico as part of the Bacardi Pioneers Project with Norman Jay. In 2012 Untold played on the main stage of Sonar Festival in Barcelona and undertook a US Tour. To coincide with the Black Light Spiral album Untold began to play live in 2014. He undertook live shows at album launch parties at La Machine in Paris, Bloc in London, Dekmantel in Amsterdam and Berghain in Berlin.

== Discography ==
Year	Release	Label
2014	Black Light Spiral	Hemlock Recordings
2013	Targa / Glare	50 Weapons
2012	Change in a Dynamic Environment Part 2: Caslon / Breathe	Hemlock Recordings
2012	Change in a Dynamic Environment Part 1: Motion The Dance / Luminous	Hemlock Recordings
2011	Little Things Like That / Bachelors Delight	Clone Records
2010	Stereo Freeze / Mass Dreams of the Future	R&S Records
2010	Come Follow Me / Fly Girls	Soul Jazz Records
2010	Long Range / Myth (w/ Roska)	Numbers
2010	Beacon (w/ LV)	Hemlock Recordings
2009	Gonna Work Out Fine EP	Hemlock Recordings
2009	Just For You	Hot Flush Recordings
2009	I Can't Stop This Feeling / Anaconda	Hessle Audio
2009	Flexible	Brainmath
2009	Sweat / Dante	Hot Flush Recordings
2009	Revenue (Untold Remix)	2nd Drop Records
2008	Discipline / Bones	Hemlock Recordings
2008	Yukon / Walk Through Walls	Hemlock Recordings
2008	Kingdom / Purify / Test Signal	Hessle Audio

== Remixes ==
- Dels – Gob (2011)
- Zero dB – Bongos, Bleeps & Basslines (2011)
- The XX – Islands (2010)
- Boys Noize – Transmission (2010)
- Ke$ha – Tik Tok (2009)
- Jose James – Blackmagic (2009)
- Modeselektor – Revenue (2009)
- Moderat – Seamonkey (2009)
