= James Brown Is Dead =

1991 single by L.A. Style

Single by L.A. Style

from the album L.A. Style
- Released: 19 August 1991
- Genre: Techno; rave
- Length: 5:38
- Label: Bounce
- Songwriter: Denzil Slemming
- Producer: Wessel van Diepen Denzil Slemming

L.A. Style singles chronology
| "James Brown Is Dead" (1991) | "I'm Raving" (1992) |

Music video
- "James Brown Is Dead" on YouTube

"James Brown Is Dead" is a song by Dutch electronic dance music duo L.A. Style, produced by Wessel van Diepen and Denzil Slemming. It was released in August 1991 as the lead single from their debut album, L.A. Style (1993). The song was a major hit across Europe, reaching number one in Belgium, the Netherlands and Spain. It additionally reached the top 10 in Australia, Germany, Sweden and Switzerland. In the United States, it peaked at number 59 on the Billboard Hot 100.

The song inspired multiple answer songs and is considered a "techno classic" with artists like DJ Irene mixing it into their sets and DJ Boozy Woozy who used samples of Mary J. Blige's "Family Affair" with the main sample of "James Brown Is Dead" to create his song "Party Affair" (2002). In 2001, Wessel van Diepen and Arista Records released "James Brown Is Dead 2001", a new version of the L.A. Style original.

== Critical reception ==
Andy Kastanas from The Charlotte Observer wrote, "This is high energy rave at its frantic beat. Racing forward like a locomotive, it never slows down until you're exhausted. The voice tells you that 'James Brown is dead' while the beat rocks your body from here to eternity." Robert Hilburn from Los Angeles Times commented in his year-end review of 1992, "A good starting point because this record's self-conscious, yet unapologetic celebration of dance-floor minimalism helped give the movement credibility and direction. Released in 1991, but it enjoyed its greatest success this year." Spin's Charles Aaron describes "James Brown Is Dead" as "the first pure techno single ever to chart on Billboard's Top 100."

== Track listing ==
- Europe, CD single (1991)
1. "James Brown Is Dead" (Radio Edit) – 3:32
2. "James Brown Is Dead" – 5:38
3. "James Brown Is Dead" – 5:09
- US, CD single (1992)
1. "James Brown Is Dead (7-inch Version of Original Mix (Without Rap))" – 3:06
2. "James Brown Is Dead (7-inch Version of Original Mix (With Rap))" – 3:30
3. "James Brown Is Dead (Rock Radio Mix)(Vocals – Chris Randall of Sister Machine Gun)" – 3:20
4. "James Brown Is Dead (Crossover Radio Mix)" – 3:57
5. "James Brown Is Dead (Original Mix (Without Rap))" – 5:38
6. "James Brown Is Dead (Original Mix (With Rap))" – 6:04
7. "James Brown Is Dead (Deadly Remix)" – 5:26
8. "James Brown Is Dead (Wide Awake Remix)" – 5:21
9. "James Brown Is Dead (Take Outs)" – 0:55

== Charts ==
=== Weekly charts ===
| Chart (1991–1992) | Peak position |
|---|---|
| Australia (ARIA) | 7 |
| Austria (Ö3 Austria Top 40) | 24 |
| Belgium (Ultratop 50 Flanders) | 1 |
| Europe (Eurochart Hot 100) | 8 |
| Germany (GfK) | 6 |
| Greece (IFPI) | 1 |
| Italy (Musica e dischi) | 2 |
| Netherlands (Dutch Top 40) | 1 |
| Netherlands (Single Top 100) | 1 |
| Portugal (AFP) | 5 |
| Spain (AFYVE) | 1 |
| Sweden (Sverigetopplistan) | 7 |
| Switzerland (Schweizer Hitparade) | 2 |
| UK Dance (Music Week) | 19 |
| UK Club Chart (Record Mirror) | 17 |
| US Billboard Hot 100 | 59 |
| US 12-inch Singles Sales (Billboard) | 14 |
| US Dance Club Play (Billboard) | 4 |

=== Year-end charts ===
| Chart (1991) | Position |
|---|---|
| Belgium (Ultratop 50 Flanders) | 4 |
| Netherlands (Dutch Top 40) | 4 |
| Netherlands (Single Top 100) | 7 |

| Chart (1992) | Position |
|---|---|
| Australia (ARIA) | 61 |
| Europe (Eurochart Hot 100) | 78 |
| Germany (Media Control) | 51 |
| Sweden (Topplistan) | 38 |
| US Maxi-Singles Sales (Billboard) | 50 |

== Certifications ==
| Region | Certification | Certified units/sales |
|---|---|---|
| Netherlands (NVPI) | Gold | 75,000^{^} |
^{^} Shipments figures based on certification alone.

== Release history ==
| Region | Version | Date | Format(s) | Label(s) | Ref. |
|---|---|---|---|---|---|
| Europe | "James Brown Is Dead" | 19 August 1991 | 7-inch vinyl; 12-inch vinyl; CD | Various | |
| Japan | "James Brown Is Dead" | 21 January 1992 | Mini-CD | Mode 99; Avex Trax | |
| Australia | "James Brown Is Dead" | 16 March 1992 | 12-inch vinyl; CD; cassette | Arista | |
| Japan | "James Dad Is Brown" | 23 September 1992 | Mini-CD | Mode 99; Avex Trax | |

== Answer songs ==
- In the wake of "James Brown Is Dead" the song "James Brown Is Still Alive" was released that same year by Holy Noise, a techno group also from the Netherlands. Although the first song's lyrics do actually assert that James Brown (1933–2006), "the hardest working man in showbiz is alive", the Holy Noise song is regarded as an answer to the L.A. Style song.
- In 1992, J.Y. Factory released "James Brown is Dead or Alive!?!?", remixing both James Brown Is Dead and James Brown Is Still Alive, in addition to T99's Anasthasia.
- Also in 1992, Mexican comedian Memo Ríos recorded a Spanish parody called "Pedro Infante murió" ("Pedro Infante Is Dead") referring to the Mexican film actor.

== In popular culture ==
Professional wrestler and mixed martial artist Yoji Anjo has used the song as his entrance music in UWF International.
