= Dominator (Human Resource song) =

Single by Human Resource

from the album Dominating the World
- Released: 1991
- Genre: Techno, breakbeat
- Length: 3:38 (radio mix); 4:34 (Joey Beltram remix)
- Label: 80 Aum Recordings
- Songwriters: Johan van Beek, Robert Mahu
- Producers: Johan van Beek, Robert Mahu

Human Resource singles chronology
"Dominator" (1991)	"The Joke" (1991)

"Dominator" is a song by the Dutch electronic music group Human Resource. It is the group's debut single released in 1991 which later appeared on their full-length album Dominating the World. The single reached No. 36 on the UK singles chart and No. 6 on both the Dutch Single Top 100 and Belgian Ultratop 50 charts.

== Remixes ==
There were over 50 remixes with American DJ Joey Beltram's being the most popular in clubs and raves in its year of release. His version includes the characteristic hoover sound, taken from his earlier single "Mentasm". "Dominator (Joey Beltram Remix)" was included on The Pitchfork 500. The latest version of the track is the collaboration between Danny Bond and Human Resource released in August 2023 on Patrick Topping's Trick label.

== Cultural references ==
Lyrics from "Dominator" were quoted in Scooter's 2001 single "Posse (I Need You on the Floor)". It was reported that Lady Gaga's 2009 single "Bad Romance" sampled the song without permission or recognition but no further legal action was taken. It was also sampled in the Boy Sim song "Break Your Heart", Rihanna's "Birthday Cake", "Dominator" by clipping., and also in an unreleased Charli XCX song titled "Supernova".

== Charts ==
=== Weekly charts ===
Chart (1991)	Peak position
Belgium (Ultratop 50 Flanders)	6
Netherlands (Dutch Top 40)	10
Netherlands (Single Top 100)	6
UK Singles (OCC)	36

=== Year-end charts ===
Chart (1991)	Position
Belgium (Ultratop Flanders)	39
Netherlands (Dutch Top 40)	84
Netherlands (Single Top 100)	51
