= L.A. Style (album) =

Studio album by L.A. Style
- Released: 1993
- Recorded: The Netherlands & Belgium
- Length: 41:16
- Label: Arista
- Producer: Ray Decadance, FX (Frans Merkx), Wessel van Diepen, Michiel van der Kuy & Fonny de Wulf

Professional ratings
Review scores
Source	Rating
AllMusic	1.5/5 stars
Entertainment Weekly	B+

L.A. Style is the debut album by the group of the same name and produced by Wessel van Diepen, Michiel Van Der Kuy, Frans Merkx, Alfons "Fonny" de Wulf) and Ray Decadence. It was released in 1993 on Arista.

The album made Billboard charts history when in 1992 their single "James Brown Is Dead" became the first electronic dance song to appear in Billboard's weekly pop rankings.

The album marked the first appearance of trip hop vocalist Nicolette as a featured and lead artist. Nicolette & FX appears on the single "I'm Raving" with the rest of the album rapped by lead artist FX a.k.a. Frans Merkx.

== Track listing ==
1. "James Brown Is Dead" (Denzil Slemming) – 5:38
2. "Balloony" (Foco & Frans Merkx) – 4:30
3. "Jesus on Channel 4" (Frans Merkx),(Gus Roan, Koen Tillie) – 3:48
4. "I'm Raving" (Maxx Mondino, Nicolette Okoh, Slemming) & (Frans Merkx)(Frans Merkx) – 5:16
5. "It's Your Life, Baby" (King Arthur, K.C. Level, MC EZ-F / FX (Frans Merkx], Mondino, Slemming) – 3:46
6. "L.A. Style Theme" (Slemming) – 3:46
7. "Twilight Zone" (Slemming) – 3:20
8. "Toys (Use It)" (King Arthur, Mondino, Slemming)&[FX]Frans Merkx)– 3:23
9. "Everybody Dance" (Oliver Adams, Foco, Frans Merkx) – 4:21
10. "American Dream" (Slemming) – 3:13

== Charts ==
Album

Year	Chart	Peak position
1993	Billboard Top Heatseekers	21

Singles

Year	Song	Chart	Peak position
1991	"James Brown Is Dead"	Hot Dance Music/Club Play	4
1991	"James Brown Is Dead"	Hot Dance Music/Maxi-Singles Sales	14
1992	"James Brown Is Dead"	Billboard Hot 100	59
1993	"I'm Raving"	Hot Dance Music/Maxi-Singles Sales	9
