= Black Light Spiral =

Studio album by Untold
- Released: February 2014
- Label: Hemlock Records

Black Light Spiral is the debut album from Jack Dunning, aka Untold, released on his own label Hemlock records.

== Composition ==
Black Light Spiral is an unconventional record compositionally focused more on harsh horror atmospheres than consistent dance rhythms, summarized Larry Fitzmaurice: "the rhythms are wrapped in spikes, the melodies are built out of transistor-radio noise and abused vocal samples, and the empty space surrounding everything possesses a seasick unsteadiness." Crack Magazine described the entire LP as "one amorphous blur of mescaline loops and decayed rhythms, held together by the restless ghost of the UK's illustrious rave past."

== Critical reception ==
Professional ratings
Review scores
Source	Rating
Crack Magazine	18/20
Fact	4/5
Pitchfork	7.6/10
Resident Advisor	4/5
Spin	9/10
XLR8R	8/10

Crack Magazine praised Black Light Spiral for continuing Untold's "alchemic ability to distill storied influences into something that sounds like nothing you've ever heard before is still unparalleled." On the other hand, Fitzmaurice, while appreciating it as "a beguiling artistic statement of an album in a genre where finding success in the LP format isn't always a given," felt its abstractness may turn off fans of previous Untold material that had more "directly engaging qualities." Resident Advisor reviewer Andrew Ryce concluded that "the best aspect of the album is also the worst: it's alienating in a way that might actually alienate you, and keep you from revisiting."

== Track listing ==
1. 5 Wheels
2. Drop It On the One
3. Sing a Love Song
4. Doubles
5. Wet Wool
6. Strange Dreams
7. Hobthrust
8. Ion
