= L.A. Style =

Dutch/Belgian/British techno-rap dance music group

L.A. STYLE
- FX & Bibi

Background information
- Origin: Netherlands / Belgium / England
- Genres: Techno, new beat, Eurodance
- Years active: 1991–1996
- Label: Arista, Avex Japan

L.A. STYLE was a British-Belgian-Dutch collaboration techno dance music group, consisting of founder, producer and radio DJ Wessel van Diepen (who later also created Nakatomi and the successful Vengaboys), composer Denzil Slemming (a.k.a. Michiel Van Der Kuy of Laserdance fame) and FX a.k.a. Frans Merkx (of Infobeat), as well as Foco (Alfons "Fonny" de Wulf) and Ray Decadance (surname Muylle) of the Belgian project Rofo (credited with FX as writers and producers of "Balloony"). L.A. Style was most notable for their 1991 single "James Brown Is Dead" and their 1992 single "I'm Raving", both of which appeared on Billboard's Hot 100 Airplay chart, making them the first EDM group to venture near the top 50 of the main Billboard singles chart.

== Career ==
The group was fronted by rapper/singer/songwriter & producer FX, also known as The BFD (real name Frans Merkx). Wessel van Diepen and Fonny de Wulf were also known for their skills by bringing a different sound to dance and mixing that with the talents of the lead artist FX. FX is considered one of the first to set the trend of combining Euro pop with Rap in an effort to bring the masses a different flavor of dance techno. FX had numerous hits with Infobeat, which was hugely successful with lead singer Irma Derby, most notably with the singles "We Got the Funk" and "Are U Ready". After joining L.A. Style, he followed up the huge success of the international hit "James Brown Is Dead" with the smash hit "I'm Raving". L.A. Style appeared on MTV's The Grind and toured extensively all over North America, Japan, and Europe with massive success. FX and Wessel van Diepen mixed rap, rock, and techno, setting the trend for other groups to similarly mix those styles.

L. A. Style released a self-titled album as well as other singles, but despite massive success overseas as well as dance club play, L.A. Style's moment faded after the departure of the lead artist FX, after which they quickly faded and dispersed in 1996. Following his work in L.A. Style, Wessel van Diepen has continued to be a popular radio DJ in the Netherlands, and FX has been traveling the world working. As FX said, "I've worked with many great artists and even found great artists like Irma Derby, and if something comes along that excites me, then I will be back in the studio."

== Discography ==
=== Albums ===
- L.A. Style (1993)

=== Singles ===
List of singles, with selected chart positions
Title	Year	Peak chart positions			Album
Title	Year	NLD	AUS	US	Album
"James Brown Is Dead"	1991	1	7	59	L.A. Style
"I'm Raving"	1992	13	65	50	L.A. Style
"Balloony"	1993	—	—	—	L.A. Style
"We Got the Funk" Infobeat	1989	—	—	—	Non-album singles
"Are U Ready" Infobeat	1991	—	—	—	Non-album singles
"Got to Move"	1994	—	—	—	Non-album singles
"Magic Trip"	1995	—	—	—	Non-album singles
