= Human Resource (band) =

Dutch electronic music group

- Also known as: Human Resource 44 M, Human Nature, HR
- Origin: Ridderkerk, Netherlands
- Genres: Techno, hardcore techno, hardstyle, hard techno, gabber
- Years active: 1990–1999, 2004–present
- Labels: 2B Free Records, K.N.O.R. Records, 80 Aum Records, EDM
- Members: Guido Pernet; Maurice Steenbergen
- Past members: Kirk Patrick; Jasper Drexhage; Johan van Beek; Larenzo Nash; Robert Mahu; Marvin D Sander Scheurwater; Zenon Zevenbergen

Human Resource is a Dutch electronic music group established in 1990.

== History ==
The first members of the group were mixer Robert Mahu and keyboardist Johan Van Beek. They were later joined by keyboardists Jasper Drexhage and Guido Pernet (also MC) and finally by rapper and former professional basketball player Larenzo Nash. They came from the Ridderkerk area. In 1991 they released their biggest hit, "Dominator", famous for being remixed by Joey Beltram and including one of the first uses of Hoover sound. A remixed version appeared on The Pitchfork 500. It was allegedly sampled on Lady Gaga's single Bad Romance in 2009 without royalties or permission and lawfully sampled on Rihanna's "Birthday Cake".

In 1992, Van Beek left without being permanently replaced. Soon after rapper Marvin D became a band member but left in 1995. After Drexhage's departure over dissatisfaction with their new hardcore sound he was replaced by Sander Scheurwater. Human Resource disbanded at the end of 1990s.

Guido Pernet formed the band once again, this time with Zenon Zevenbergen, former MC for gabber producer Patrick van Kerckhoven and vocalist of T99, and Maurice Steenbergen of Rotterdam Termination Source. Zevenbergen left soon after the tour in 2005. The same year they introduced the new gabber music festival named Dominator.

== Discography ==
=== Albums ===
- 1991: Dominating the World (2B Free Records) #60 NETH
- 1993: Kicking Noise of Rotterdam (2B Free Records)

=== Singles ===
- 1991: "Dominator" (80 Aum Records) - #6 NETH, #6 BEL, #36 UK
- 1992: "The Joke" (2B Free Records) #40 NETH
- 1992: "Me the Power!" (2B Free Records)
- 1992: "Rave-O-lution" (2B Free Records)
- 1993: "Beyond the Edge" (2B Free Records)
- 1994: "Fuck Them" (K.N.O.R. Records)
- 1996: "Dominator '96" (K.N.O.R. Records)
- 1996: "In the Hall of the Mountain King" (K.N.O.R. Records)
- 2016: "Dominator" (Note: A remix of the original 1991 Dominator) Armin van Buuren vs. Human Resource (Armada Music)
- 2022: "Fuck Them" with Bingo Players (Spinnin' Records)
- 2025: "Dominator" (Note: A remix of the original 1991 Dominator) with Boys Noize (Armada Music)
