= Holy Noise =

Dutch musical group

Holy Noise was an electronic dance music group from the early 1990s best known for the 1991 song "James Brown is Still Alive". Its membership consisted of Paul Elstak, Rob Fabrie, Elidio Gomes, Richard van Naamen, all of whom were from Rotterdam, Netherlands and Peter Slaghuis from Rijswijk, Netherlands.
