= The Bells Sketch =

EP by James Blake
- Released: 8 March 2010
- Genre: Post-dubstep
- Length: 14:37
- Label: Hessle Audio (HES011)
- Producer: James Blake

James Blake chronology
"Air & Lack Thereof" (single) (2009)	The Bells Sketch (2010)	CMYK (2010)

The Bells Sketch is the debut EP of English singer-songwriter James Blake. It was released on 8 March 2010 by Hessle Audio. The EP was very positively reviewed.

== Composition ==
The songs on The Bells Sketch have a speed of around 72 beats per minute, which is considered slow for dance music. The title track of the EP features "playful" vocals, "erratic jazz piano basslines", and synthesizers. The song's vocals are a mix of samples and Blake's own voice. It opens with a violin-like sound, after which Blake starts singing. After each phrase, a "video-game noise" covers up the vocals. Halfway through the track, Blake's voice is drowned out by bass.

The next track, "Buzzard and Kestrel", starts with a mixture of muffled vocals and dog whistle melodies. The song stays this way for half its duration, until a cowbell is played. The song then fades out as it ends. It is influenced by lounge piano and Outkast snare patterns, and features some synthesizer. The album's final track, "Give a Man a Rod", is driven by claps sounding like drums, and vocals akin to Flying Lotus. A version without a drop was released in 2011, entitled "Give a Man a Rod (Second Version)".

== Reception ==
Professional ratings
Review scores
Source	Rating
Fact	4.5/5
Resident Advisor	4.5/5

The EP was critically acclaimed by reviewers. Mike Coleman of Fact gave The Bells Sketch 4 and a half "records" out of 5, saying "The Bells Sketch is a complex thing – beautiful and difficult, its glitch-peppered oddities are addictive, but bursting at the seams with a desire to experiment and a complete lack of compromise." Mike Powell of Pitchfork said of the EP: "I think it's both [brilliant and a high-concept mess], but I really like high-concept messes."

Resident Advisor also gave the album 4 and a half stars out of 5. Critic Oli Marlow said: "Deliciously weird, off-key and superbly layered, James Blake's debut outing on Hessle Audio manages to succinctly justify the hype his work is now receiving." In 2010, Pitchfork named The Bells Sketch the eighth best album of the year, along with fellow EPs CMYK and Klavierwerke; the website was "amazed" at how Blake released three EPs in one year, all of different styles.

== Track listing ==
No.	Title	Length
1.	"The Bells Sketch"	4:18
2.	"Buzzard & Kestrel"	5:43
3.	"Give a Man a Rod"	4:36
