= AB Logic =

Belgian Eurodance project by Jacko Bultinck and Peter Gillis

- Origin: Baal, Belgium
- Genres: Eurodance, euro disco
- Years active: 1991–1996
- Members: Cedric Murril; Marianne Festraets

AB Logic was a Belgian eurodance project arranged and produced by Jacko Bultinck and Peter Gillis in 1991. Its members included rapper K-Swing (Cedric Murril) and pop music vocalist Marianne Festraets. In 1992, they released the song "The Hitman". The same year, they released their self-titled debut album, which received a positive review from Alex Henderson of AllMusic. It fared much better on various mainland European pop charts than on the Billboard 200 album chart. They scored two minor Billboard Hot 100 hits in 1992 with "The Hitman" (#60) and "Get Up (Move Boy Move)" (#83). In Australia, "The Hitman" reached the top 10 on the ARIA singles chart in 1993, and was certified gold. Another charting single, "AB Logic", was released in 1993.

Although "The Hitman" never made the UK national charts, it was a regional hit in North East England, making the Top 20 of MRIB's chart for Metro Radio in that region.

== Discography ==
=== Albums ===
Year	Album	Album details	Peak chart positions	
Year	Album	Album details	AUS	US Hitseekers
1992	AB Logic	Release date: 1992; Label: Warner Music	63	37

=== Singles ===
Year	Single	Peak chart positions						Certifications	Album
Year	Single	BEL (FLA)	AUS	FIN	SWE	US	US Dance	Certifications	Album
1992	"The Hitman"	14	6	—	—	60	20	AUS: Gold	AB Logic
1992	"Get Up (Move Boy Move)"	—	—	—	—	83	15		AB Logic
1993	"AB Logic"	—	60	6	29	—	—		AB Logic
1994	"Real World"	—	204	—	—	—	—		Singles only
1996	"Welcome to My Heart"	—	—	—	—	—	—		Singles only
"—" denotes a single that did not chart or was not released in that region.
