= Paul Vanden Boeynants =

Belgian politician (1919–2001)

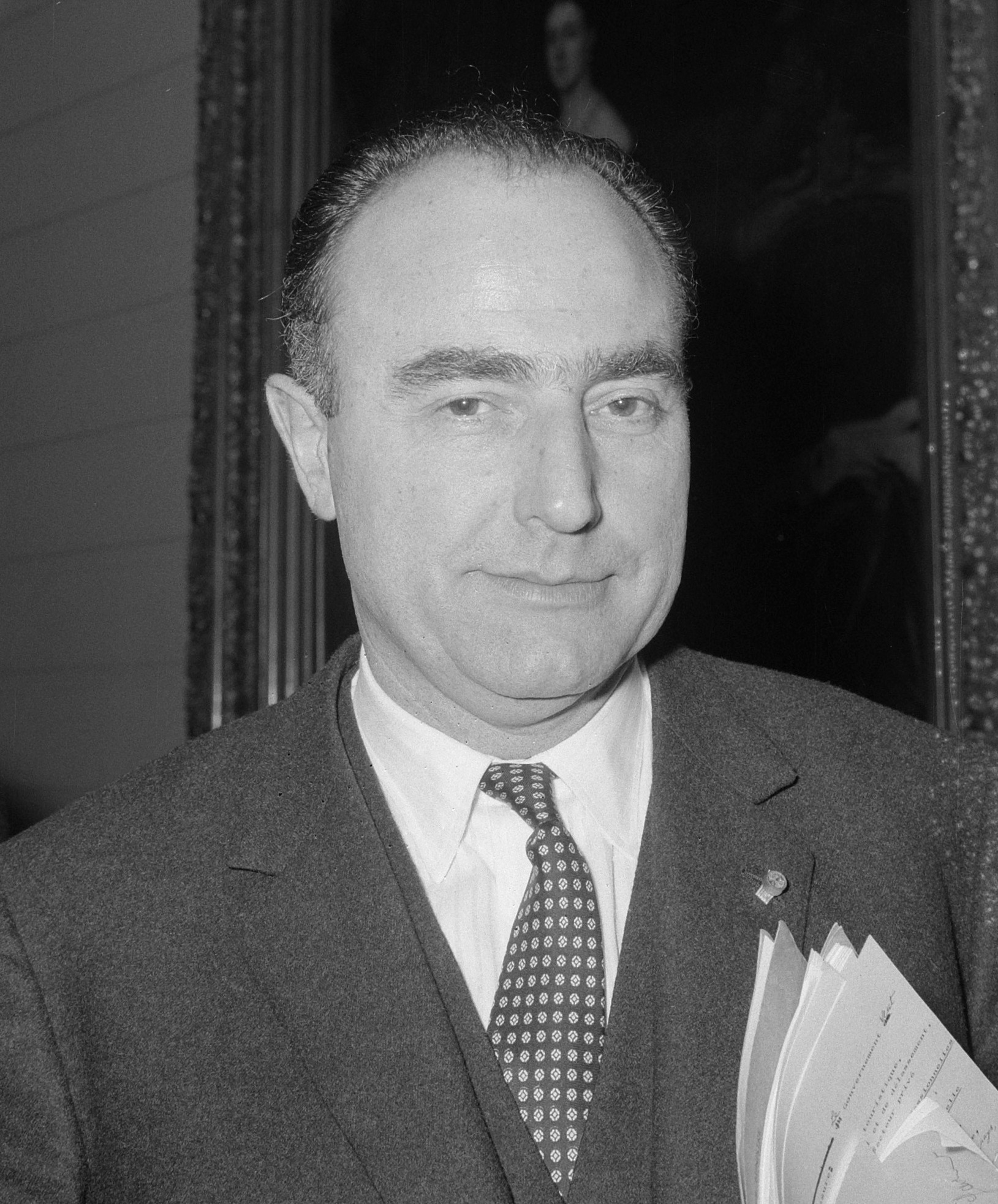
- Vanden Boeynants in 1966

Prime Minister of Belgium
- In office 20 October 1978 – 3 March 1979
- Monarch: Baudouin
- Preceded by: Leo Tindemans
- Succeeded by: Wilfried Martens
- In office 19 March 1966 – 17 June 1968
- Monarch: Baudouin
- Preceded by: Pierre Harmel
- Succeeded by: Gaston Eyskens

Minister of Defense
- In office 1972–1979
- Prime Minister: Gaston Eyskens; Edmond Leburton; Leo Tindemans
- Preceded by: Paul Willem Segers
- Succeeded by: José Desmarets

Personal details
- Born: 22 May 1919 Forest, Belgium
- Died: 9 January 2001 (aged 81) Aalst, Belgium
- Party: Christian Social Party; Humanist Democratic Centre

Paul Emile François Henri Vanden Boeynants (Dutch: [ˈpʌul vɑndə(m) ˈbuinɑnts], French: [pɔl vandən bujnants]; 22 May 1919 – 9 January 2001) was a Belgian politician. He served as the prime minister of Belgium for two brief periods (1966–68 and 1978–79).

== Career ==
Vanden Boeynants (called "VDB" by journalists) was born in Forest / Vorst, a municipality now in the Brussels-Capital Region. Active as a businessman in the meat industry, he was a Representative for the PSC-CVP between 1949 and 1979. From 1961 to 1966 he led the Christian democrat PSC-CVP (which was in those days a single party). He led the CEPIC, its conservative fraction.

In 1966, he became Prime Minister of Belgium; he stayed in this post for two years. From 1972–1979 he served as minister of defense. In 1978–1979 he led another Belgian government. Vanden Boeynants then served as chairman of the PSC (1979–1981). He left politics in 1995, and died in 2001.

One of his famous expressions, in a unique mixture of Dutch and French, was: Trop is te veel en te veel is trop. ("too many is too much and too much is too many").

Vanden Boeynants was part of the secretive conservative network Le Cercle.

Boeynants led a centre-left cabinet from 1966 to 1968 and another centre-left cabinet from 1978 to 1979.

== Fraud ==
Convicted in 1986 for fraud and tax evasion, Vanden Boeynants was given a suspended jail sentence of three years. This prevented him from pursuing mayoral aspirations in Brussels. He underwent a political rehabilitation during the early 1990s.

== Kidnapping ==
In an incident that is still the subject of dispute, Vanden Boeynants was kidnapped on 14 January 1989 by members of the Haemers criminal gang. Three days later, the criminals published a note in the leading Brussels newspaper Le Soir, demanding 30 million Belgian francs in ransom. Vanden Boeynants was released unharmed a month later, on 13 February, when an undisclosed ransom was paid to the perpetrators. The gang members were caught and imprisoned. Patrick Haemers, the head of the gang, died from suicide in prison, and two members of his gang managed to escape from the St Gillis Prison in 1993.

=== In popular culture ===
The kidnapping was referenced in a 1989 novelty song by the New Beat band Brussels Sound Revolution called "Qui...?", which featured samples from the press conference Vanden Boeynants gave after his kidnapping. It was a hit on both sides of the Belgian language border. In Flanders, Belgium, it reached the 28th place in the Radio 2 hitparade at the time for one week.

== Alleged drug smuggling ==
There were allegations in the early 1980s that drugs were smuggled into Belgium hidden in frozen meat via companies linked to Vanden Boeynants (he had established a meat company called Mediterranean Meat Company). The allegations became the topic of a parliamentary inquiry, although no people were convicted.

== Alleged child abuse ==
=== Marc Dutroux ===
Paul Vanden Boeynants was named as a pedophile implicated in the larger Dutroux-affair in the book Dossier pédophilie : le scandale de l'affaire Dutroux (2001). The claims made in the book triggered a defamation suit by the relatives of Vanden Boeynants.

=== Anneke Lucas ===
In 2023, Anneke Lucas, a child sex trafficking survivor, named Vanden Boeyants as a person who was in charge of a Belgian pedophile network in the early 1970s.

== Honours ==
- Belgium: Minister of State, by Royal Decree.
- Grand Cordon in the Order of Leopold.
- Knight Grand Cross in the Order of Leopold II.
- Knight Grand Cross in the Order of Saints Michael and George.
- Grand Officer in the Legion of Honour.

== Literature ==
- N. Hirson, Paul Vanden Boeynants, Brussels, 1969.
- Paul Debogne, Les Amis de Paul Vanden Boeynants et leurs Affaires, Ed. Vie Ouvrière, Brussel, 1970.
- R. Stuyck, Paul Vanden Boeynants, boeman of supermen?, Brussels, 1973.
- Els Cleemput & Alain Guillaume, La rançon d'une vie. Paul Vanden Boeynants 30 jours aux mains de Patrick Haemers, Brussels, 1990.
- D. Ilegems & J. Willems, De avonturen van VDB, Brussels, 1991.
- P. Havaux & P. Marlet, Sur la piste du crocodile, Brussels, 1994.
- Armand De Decker, In memoriam Paul Vanden Boeynants, Belgian Senate, 18 January 2001.

Political offices
Preceded by Pierre Harmel	Prime Minister of Belgium; 1966–1968	Succeeded by Gaston Eyskens
Preceded by Paul Willem Segers	Minister of Defense; 1972–1979	Succeeded by José Desmarets
Preceded by Leo Tindemans	Prime Minister of Belgium; 1978–1979	Succeeded by Wilfried Martens
