= Joey Beltram =

American DJ and music producer

- Born: November 6, 1971 (age 54)
- Origin: Queens, New York, U.S.
- Genres: Techno
- Occupations: Record producer; DJ
- Years active: 1990–present

Joey Beltram (born November 6, 1971) is an American DJ and record producer, best known for his pioneering singles "Energy Flash" and "Mentasm" and for remixing Human Resource's "Dominator".

== Rave recordings ==
"Mentasm" (is inspired by the title "Acid Rock" by Rhythm Device released in 1989 and the title "Do That Dance" by The Project released in 1990), co-produced with Mundo Muzique and released under the artist name Second Phase in 1991, became iconic within rave culture, as it was the track that gave birth to the "mentasm riff" (also known as the "hoover sound"): a churning, dirgelike synth pattern that wormed into techno's communal genome and has since been mutated and reused in thousands of records. The "mentasm riff" is also strongly associated with drum and bass, the Belgian techno scene (with the titles "Le Seigneur des ténèbres" by Pleasure Game released in 1991 and "Destiny" by Insider released in 1991), and the R&S record label, as well as hardcore/hard house in their various permutations since 1992 (with the titles "Fuckin Revenge!" by Friends Of Django released in 1992 and "Cosmic Trash" by Vitamin released in 1993). Beltram was referenced as a pioneer in the late 1990s house music scene by Daft Punk, in their song "Teachers" off their 1997 debut album, Homework and author, Simon Reynolds, credited Beltram with having "revolutionized techno twice before the age of 21," when describing both "Energy Flash" and "Mentasm" in his book Generation Ecstasy.

Throughout the years, Beltram has continually toured at major festivals around the globe. He has also continued releasing techno, with his 1993 and 1994 tracks "Aonox" on Visible and "the Beltram re-releases" on Trax, the "Caliber" EP on Warp, and his 1995 LP Places and 1996 single, "Ball Park" on Tresor counting among his work in the 1990s. He was also invited to release another album, Close Grind, on Daniel Miller's Novamute imprint under the JB³ alias.

In 1999, he launched his own label STX with Arena, while he continued to release under Code 6 and JB³, as well as headlining events such as Awakenings, Coachella, Nature One, Mayday and Dance Valley. Returning to Tresor in 2004, he released the album Rising Sun. And he has kept up a busy release schedule ever since, with tracks on Womb, Harthouse, Drumcode, MB Electroniks, and Bush.

== Selected discography ==
=== Compilation albums ===
- Classics (1996)
- The Sound of 2AM (1999)

=== Singles ===
- "Energy Flash" (1990)
- "Mentasm" (1991, as Second Phase)
- "Cop Car" (1994)
- "Caliber" (1994; UK No. 96)
- "Game Form" (1995)

== See also ==
- Oldskool hardcore
- R&S Records
- Techno
- Transmat
- Tresor
