= Patrick Haemers =

Belgian criminal (1952–1993)

Patrick Haemers (2 November 1952, Schaerbeek – 14 May 1993) was a Belgian criminal who was member of a gang which carried out robberies of security vans and kidnapped former Belgian prime minister Paul Vanden Boeynants.

== Biography ==
The son of a nightclub owner, Haemers was tall with striking looks, and became known for his hedonistic lifestyle. He became addicted to cocaine and was convicted of rape. After serving a few years he was released, and was involved in a money laundering scheme. His offending escalated until he was participating in armed robberies of security vans that occurred so frequently that they led to greatly increased security. He left the country for a time, but on 14 January 1989 he was part of a gang that kidnapped former Belgian prime minister Paul Vanden Boeynants, releasing Vanden Boeynants on 13 February 1989 for a reportedly huge ransom. Other members of the Haemers Gang were Basri Bajrami, who hailed from Kosovo, Marc Van Dam, Philippe Lacroix and Denise Tyack. Wanted in Belgium on several criminal counts, and by this time having an infant son, he fled to Brazil with his girlfriend, but they were tracked down. He was extradited back to Belgium. Suffering severe withdrawal symptoms in prison, and after a transfer prevented him joining an escape with his accomplices, the by then 40-year-old was apparently unable to cope with the prospect of serving a long sentence. He hanged himself from a 130-centimetre (4'3")-high radiator in a Belgian jail cell in 1993. He was at one time considered a likely suspect as the so-called 'giant' of the Brabant killers, but unlike the relatively small-time robberies of the Brabant gang, Haemers's crimes were always aimed at high-value rewards.

== In popular culture ==
The kidnapping of Vanden Boeynants by the Haemers gang was made into a novelty song, Qui...? (1989) by the New Beat band Brussels Sound Revolution, which contained samples from Vanden Boeynants' press conference. It was a hit on both sides of the Belgian language border. In Flanders, Belgium it reached the 28th place in the Radio 2 hit parade at the time for one week.
