= T99 =

Belgian electronic music duo

- Origin: Belgium
- Genres: New beat; Belgian techno; breakbeat; electronic
- Years active: 1989–1992, 2000
- Label: Columbia/Emphasis
- Past members: Patrick DeMeyer; Olivier Abbeloos

T99 were a Belgian music duo best known for their song "Anasthasia", which reached number 13 on the UK Singles Chart in May 1991.

T99 was a project created by Patrick DeMeyer, who released three records under this alias. When he heard Olivier Abbeloos (of Quadrophonia) working on the track "Anasthasia", he suggested that they jointly release it as T99.

T99 experienced brief success with "Anasthasia" and its follow-up, "Nocturne". Their only album release, Children of Chaos, contained seventeen tracks that varied from hardcore techno to ambient techno, along with a spoken-word performance art piece. Their sound has since been sampled by 2 Unlimited, Kylie Minogue, and the Chemical Brothers.

== Discography ==
=== Albums ===
- Children of Chaos (1992)
- Complete Works: The Best of T99 (2000)

=== Singles ===
| Year | Single | Peak positions | | | | | | | Album |
| Year | Single | BEL (FLA) | NED | SWI | SWE | IRE | UK | US Dance | Album |
|---|---|---|---|---|---|---|---|---|---|
| 1988 | "Invisible Sensuality" | — | — | — | — | — | — | — | Non-album singles |
| 1988 | "Slidy" | — | — | — | — | — | — | — | Non-album singles |
| 1989 | "Too Nice to Be Real" | — | — | — | — | — | — | — | Non-album singles |
| 1991 | "Anasthasia" | 9 | 4 | 23 | — | 22 | 14 | — | Children of Chaos |
| 1991 | "Nocturne" | 39 | 19 | — | 27 | — | 33 | 5 | Children of Chaos |
| 1992 | "Gardiac" | — | — | — | — | — | — | — | Children of Chaos |
| 1992 | "Maximizor" | — | — | — | — | — | 76 | — | Children of Chaos |
| 2000 | "The Rhythm of the Groove" | — | — | — | — | — | — | — | Complete Works: The Best of T99 |
"—" denotes releases that did not chart or were not released.
