= Organic house =

Subgenre of house

- Stylistic origins: Deep house; ambient; Afro house; Melodic house
- Cultural origins: 2020
- Typical instruments: Kalimba, violin

Subgenres
- Organic house and downtempo

Other topics
- Deep house; Ethnic music

Organic house is a subgenre of house music that emphasizes acoustic instruments and natural sounds. The genre was made as a way to express a "deeper, more meditative, and occasionally slower shades of house music", often combining elements of Deep House, Melodic House, Electronica, and Afro House.

== Background ==
=== Genre naming ===
The term was first officially introduced by electronic music specialist Beatport in June 2020, although music possessing organic house characteristics had already been present since around 2017, including at well-known festivals such as Burning Man, Lightning in a Bottle, and Desert Hearts. Beatport's operators introduced the new category as a new genre to catalog house music having common elements, which previously went into segments less specific to it.

=== Style ===
The genre is characterized by a deeper mellow sound that is a combination of a multi-layered percussion line based largely on the sound of African drums such as bongos and congas, and atmospheric melodies created using both synthesizers and traditional instruments - violin, vibraphone, or kalimba.

Prominent artists of the genre include Lee Burridge, Sébastien Léger, Oliver Koletzki and Roy Rosenfeld amongst many others. Some top selling labels include All Day I Dream, Songuara, Cafe De Anatolia, Melody Of The Soul, Hoomidaas and Amulanga. At the 2024 DJ Awards the Organic House category was won by WhoMadeWho.
