= New beat =

Belgian genre of electronic music

- Stylistic origins: Acid house; EBM; hi-NRG; new wave; hip hop
- Cultural origins: Mid-to-late 1980s, Belgium
- Typical instruments: Synthesizer; drum machine; sequencer; electronic drums
- Derivative forms: Belgian techno; Hardcore techno; rave music; hardstyle; Goa trance; Eurodance; hard techno; hard trance

Subgenres
- 4-beat; hard beat; skizzo

Regional scenes
- Belgium

Local scenes
- Antwerp

New beat is a Belgian electronic dance music genre that fuses elements of new wave, hi-NRG, EBM and hip hop (e.g. scratching). It flourished in Western Europe during the late-1980s.

New beat spawned a subgenre called "hard beat" (a blend of EBM, new beat and acid house) and became a key influence on the evolution of European electronic dance music, tech-house styles such as Belgian techno, hardcore techno and gabber.

== History ==
New beat originated in Belgium in the late 1980s and was popular in several music clubs across Western Europe. Sometimes described as "new wave disco beat" the genre has been characterized as a blend of new wave, hi-NRG, EBM (which also developed in Belgium), and acid house. New beat is the immediate precursor of hardcore electronic dance music, which developed in Belgium, the Netherlands, and Germany around 1990. Belgium's native form of hardcore that emerged from new beat is also known as Belgian techno or rave techno.

The genre was "accidentally invented" in the nightclub Ancienne Belgique (AB) in Antwerp when DJ Dikke Ronny (literally "Fat Ronny") played the 45 rpm EBM record "Flesh" by A Split-Second at 33 rpm, with the pitch control set to +8. In addition to A Split-Second, new beat was also heavily influenced by other EBM acts such as Front 242, Signal Aout 42 and the Neon Judgement, as well as new wave acts such as Fad Gadget, Gary Numan, New Order, Boytronic and Anne Clark. Nightclubs such as the Boccaccio soon made the genre a major success.

In contrast to EBM, new beat records did not appear within a certain subcultural context and were mostly produced to enter the international music charts. In Belgium, compilations such as New Beat Take 1 sold 40.000 units. The Belgian sound was re-introduced to the United States market in 1989 through a compilation album known as This Is the New Beat, released through Polygram Records.

From 1988 to 1990, new beat spawned two short-lived subgenres with hard beat, a style that incorporated more elements of EBM (e.g. the Concrete Beat – "I Want You"; Major Problem – "I Still Have a Dream"; Tribe 22 – "Acid-New Beat"), and skizzo, a techno-influenced style, considerably faster than the original slow new beat style.

The most commercially successful new beat groups were Confetti's and Lords of Acid, who received heavy airplay on the MTV Europe show Party Zone. A popular novelty song was "Qui...?" (1989) by Brussels Sound Revolution, who sampled parts of a press conference speech by former prime minister Paul Vanden Boeynants after he was kidnapped by the gang of Patrick Haemers.

New beat artists and bands include Lords of Acid and Technotronic, while Belgian hardcore techno bands that emerged from the hard beat and skizzo subgenres include T99, Praga Khan, Cubic 22, and the Immortals.

== Record labels ==
The rise of the new beat genre did not only launch new artists, it also coincided with the emergence and increased prominence of several independent record labels within the Belgian electronic music scene. Some of these labels became closely associated with new beat releases during the late 1980s, achieving notable success within European club markets, particularly in Belgium and the United Kingdom. Roland Beelen and Maurice Engelen founded Antler and its subsidiary Subway Records, which played a central role in releasing new beat material. Other Belgian labels such as R&S Records were active during the same period and contributed to the broader electronic music ecosystem, although their catalogues extended beyond new beat. Additional labels that released or distributed related material include ARS and PIAS.

== Related genres ==
=== Hard beat ===
Hard beat (also known as hardbeat) is a subgenre of new beat that emerged in the late 1980s, encompassing more prominent influences from industrial music, EBM and acid house.

== Notable musicians ==
- Bizz Nizz
- Liza 'N' Eliaz
- Lords of Acid
- Patrick De Meyer
- Praga Khan
- Confetti's

== See also ==
- The Sound of Belgium – a documentary that covers the Belgian perspective on subjects including Electronic Body Music and New Beat
