= R&S Records =

Belgian independent record label

- Logo
- Founded: 1983 (original iteration); 2008 (relaunch)
- Founder: Renaat Vandepapeliere; Sabine Maes
- Defunct: 2000 (original iteration)
- Genre: Dance music, mostly techno
- Country of origin: Belgium
- Official website: rsrecords.com

R&S Records is an independent record label founded in 1983 in Ghent, Belgium. R&S represents the initials of Renaat Vandepapeliere and Sabine Maes, the couple that created the label. Having originally ceased in 2000, R&S Records relaunched in 2008, along with its subsidiary Apollo Records, in 2009.

R&S and its subsidiaries include releases by Lone, Paula Temple, Joey Beltram, Capricorn, Aphex Twin, Biosphere, C.J. Bolland, Sun Electric, The Source Experience/Robert Leiner, Model 500/Juan Atkins, Silent Phase, System 7, Dave Angel, dBridge and Ken Ishii.

== History ==
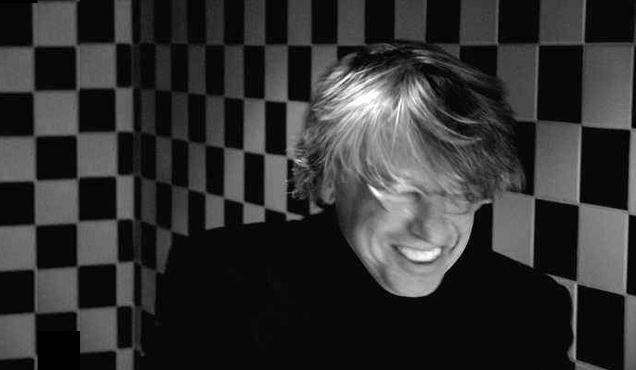
R&S Records label founder Renaat Vandepapeliere in 2012

The label was first named as Milos Music Belgium but just one record was released on the label. Vandepapeliere went from DJing to developing the label in response to his personal irritation with the Belgian music scene while getting inspired by Belgian New Beat in the late 1980s:

I worked in a record shop, but as a DJ I was getting very frustrated with the Belgian scene. The clubs were so commercial and American music just wasn't accepted. The guys that were importing records here, they went straight into the studio and created a bad cover of it. I didn't like that. I said, "Respect the artist. License it in, and let's have the original track." That's where the idea to start the label started, and it was New Beat that gave me the chance.

In 2000, Vandepapeliere shut down the label. Speaking to Stuart Aitken in 2009, he explained his reasons for doing so. "I was bored. I'd had enough. So I went and did something else. I started my stud farm."

After a hiatus from 2001 to 2006, the label re-launched from its current London base with brand new releases from new artists like James Blake, Delphic, Pariah, Space Dimension Controller, Untold, Djrum, Blawan, Synkro, Lakker, Nicolas Jaar, Vondelpark, Radioslave and the return of Model 500/Juan Atkins.

When asked in an interview with Clash Magazine in November 2009 why the label went on hiatus, Vandepapeliere explained:

I've been away because I was totally bored with the business side of music. At that moment, I thought the whole dance music scene was repeating. I was listening to the same records with the same sounds, so I said, "I've had enough. Bye, bye." I could have been a very clever businessman and exploited it. I could have made much more money, but if I don't feel something in my life – I stop.

In 2018, R&S Records released "Loyalty", the debut release from LA based soul trio Gabriels (Ari Balouzian, Ryan Hope and singer Jacob Lusk).

In February 2021, the record label was accused of discrimination against black and female artists as well as support for an antisemitic artist on the label's roster. However, the discrimination lawsuit was dismissed in May 2022.

== See also ==
- List of record labels
