= Rave =

Dance party

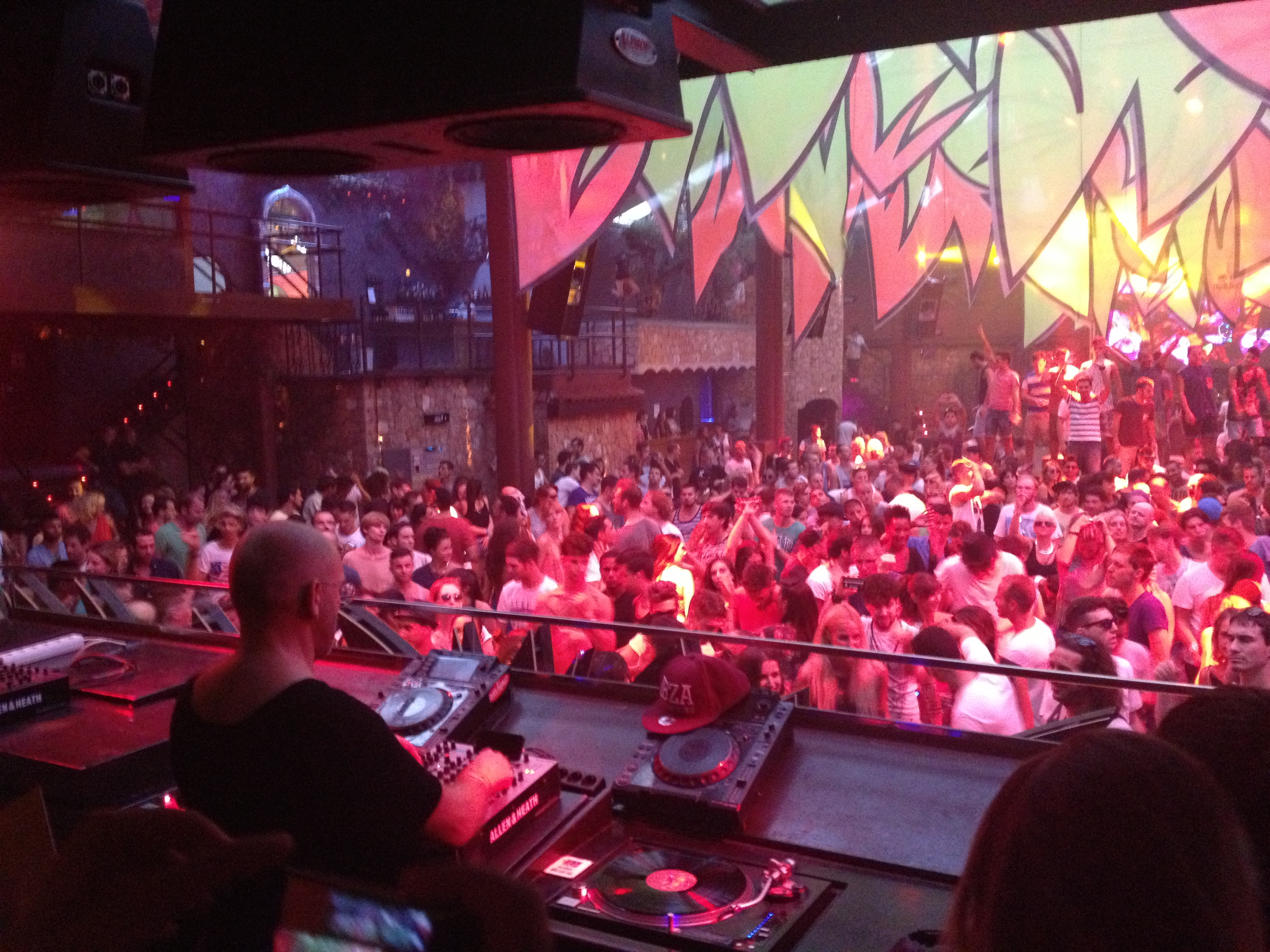
- DJ Sven Väth mixes tracks for a crowd of dancers at Amnesia, an Ibiza nightclub, in 2013.

General Information
- Location: Worldwide
- Types of street rave dance: Hakken; Para Para; Rebolation; Melbourne Shuffle; Jumpstyle
- Events: Music festival; Electronic dance music festival; technoparades; Acid house party; doof; Orchestra; Trance festival; Nature; House party; Trap music; Teknival; Algorave; Free festival; Free party; Circuit party; Concert tour
- Topics: Electronic dance music; Nightclub; Smiley; Disc jockey; VJing; Light beam; Loudspeaker; Sound system; Club drugs; MDMA; 2C-B
- Origin: Acid house; Industrial dance; Techno; Breakbeat; Hardcore; Belgian techno
- History: Second Summer of Love (late 1980s); Madchester (1990s); Criminal Justice Act (1994)

A rave (from the verb: to rave) is a dance party at a warehouse, club, or other public or private venue, typically featuring performances by DJs playing electronic dance music.

The music is amplified with a large, powerful sound reinforcement system, typically with large subwoofers to produce a deep bass sound. Occasionally live musicians perform at raves. The music is accompanied by laser light shows, projected coloured images, visual effects and fog machines. Other types of performances may be included, such as go-go dancers and fire dancers.

While some raves may be small parties held at nightclubs or private homes, some others have grown to immense size, such as the large festivals and events featuring multiple DJs and dance areas (e.g., the Castlemorton Common Festival in 1992).

Some electronic dance music festivals have features of raves, but on a larger, often commercial scale. Raves may last for a long time, with some events continuing for twenty-four hours, and lasting all through the night.

Raves are most associated with the early 1990s dance music scene, where DJs played at illegal events. Typical EDM sub-genres included acid house, techno, house, jungle, breakbeat, hardcore, happy hardcore, trance, trap and alternative dance.

Fuelled by the emerging dance scene, and spearheaded by acid house music and underground bands such as the Prodigy, many of the "acid house" parties were held in squats during the late 1980s. Well known locations such as the "Dole House" (Peckham), the abandoned bus station and the squatted children's home in Camberwell known as Groove Park had crowds of over a thousand. Full Moon parties were organised at Groove Park by Pete Marland (who went on to start the dance scene in Western Ireland in the early 1990s) and multiple events went on for over a year as an Art Collective sanctioned by locals. The Times' first colour supplement carried an article about the dance scene at Groove Park, though some of the organisers did not want to be photographed.

Law enforcement raids and anti-rave laws have presented a challenge to the rave scene in many countries. This is due to the association of rave culture with illegal drugs such as MDMA (often referred to as a "club drug" or "party drug" along with MDA), amphetamine, LSD, GHB, ketamine, methamphetamine, cocaine, and cannabis. In addition to drugs, raves often make use of non-authorized, secret venues, such as squat parties at unoccupied homes, unused warehouses, or aircraft hangars. These concerns are often attributed to a type of moral panic surrounding rave culture.

== History ==
=== Origins and etymology (1950s–1970s) ===
In the late 1950s in London, England, the term "rave" was used to describe the "wild bohemian parties" of the Soho beatnik set. Jazz musician Mick Mulligan, known for indulging in such excesses, had the nickname "king of the ravers". In 1958, Buddy Holly recorded the hit "Rave On", citing the madness and frenzy of a feeling and the desire for it never to end. The word "rave" was later used in the burgeoning mod youth culture of the early 1960s as the way to describe any wild party in general. People who were gregarious party animals were described as "ravers". Pop musicians such as Steve Marriott of Small Faces and Keith Moon of the Who were self-described "ravers". In 1965, the Grateful Dead served as the backing band for the San Francisco Acid Tests, which were LSD drug parties organized by Ken Kesey. Subsequently, visual artist Andy Warhol later organized the Exploding Plastic Inevitable in New York, a multimedia event backed with performances by the Velvet Underground and Nico, the event was characterized by flashing lights, loud music, dancing and heavy drug use. During the psychedelic era, happenings became a common fixture of the counterculture. This later culminated in the massive social phenomenon known as the Summer of Love. The phrase "Summer of Love" was used once again during the advent of rave culture in the 1980s, referring to the "Second Summer of Love".

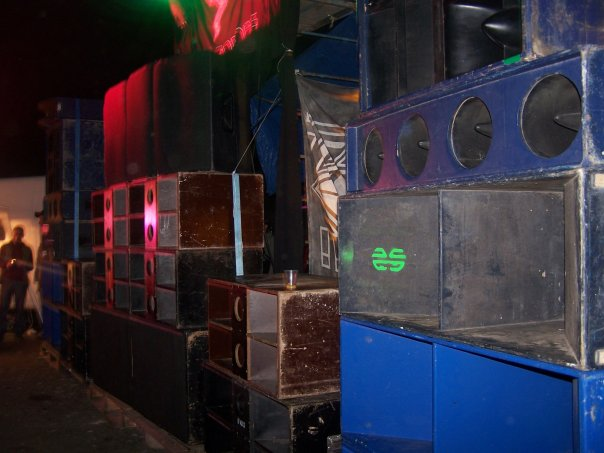
A huge bank of speakers and subwoofers from a rave sound reinforcement system

Presaging the word's subsequent 1980s association with electronic music, the word "rave" was a common term used regarding the music of mid-1960s garage rock and psychedelia bands (most notably the Yardbirds, who released an album in the United States called Having a Rave Up). Along with being an alternative term for partying at such garage events in general, the "rave-up" referred to a specific crescendo moment near the end of a song where the music was played faster, more heavily and with intense soloing or elements of controlled feedback. It was later part of the title of an electronic music performance event held on 28 January 1967 at London's Roundhouse titled the "Million Volt Light and Sound Rave". The event featured the only known public airing of an experimental sound collage created for the occasion by Paul McCartney of the Beatles – the legendary "Carnival of Light" recording.

With the rapid change of British pop culture from the mod era of 1963–1966 to the hippie era of 1967 and beyond, the term fell out of popular usage. The Northern soul movement is cited by many as being a significant step towards the creation of contemporary club culture and of the superstar DJ culture of the 2000s. As in contemporary club culture, Northern soul DJs built up a following based on satisfying the crowd's desires for music that they could not hear anywhere else. Many argue that Northern soul was instrumental in creating a network of clubs, DJs, record collectors and dealers in the UK, and was the first music scene to provide the British charts with records that sold entirely on the strength of club play.

A technique employed by northern soul DJs in common with their later counterparts was the sequencing of records to create euphoric highs and lows for the crowd; DJ Laurence 'Larry' Proxton was known for using this method. DJ personalities and their followers involved in the original Northern soul movement went on to become important figures in the house and dance music scenes. During the 1970s and early 1980s until its resurrection, the term was not in vogue, one notable exception being in the lyrics of the song "Drive-In Saturday" by David Bowie (from his 1973 album Aladdin Sane) which includes the line, "It's a crash course for the ravers." Its use during that era would have been perceived as a quaint or ironic use of bygone slang: part of the dated 1960s lexicon along with words such as "groovy".

The perception of the word "rave" changed again in the late 1980s when the term was revived and adopted by a new youth culture, possibly inspired by the use of the term in Jamaica.

=== Acid house (1980s) ===
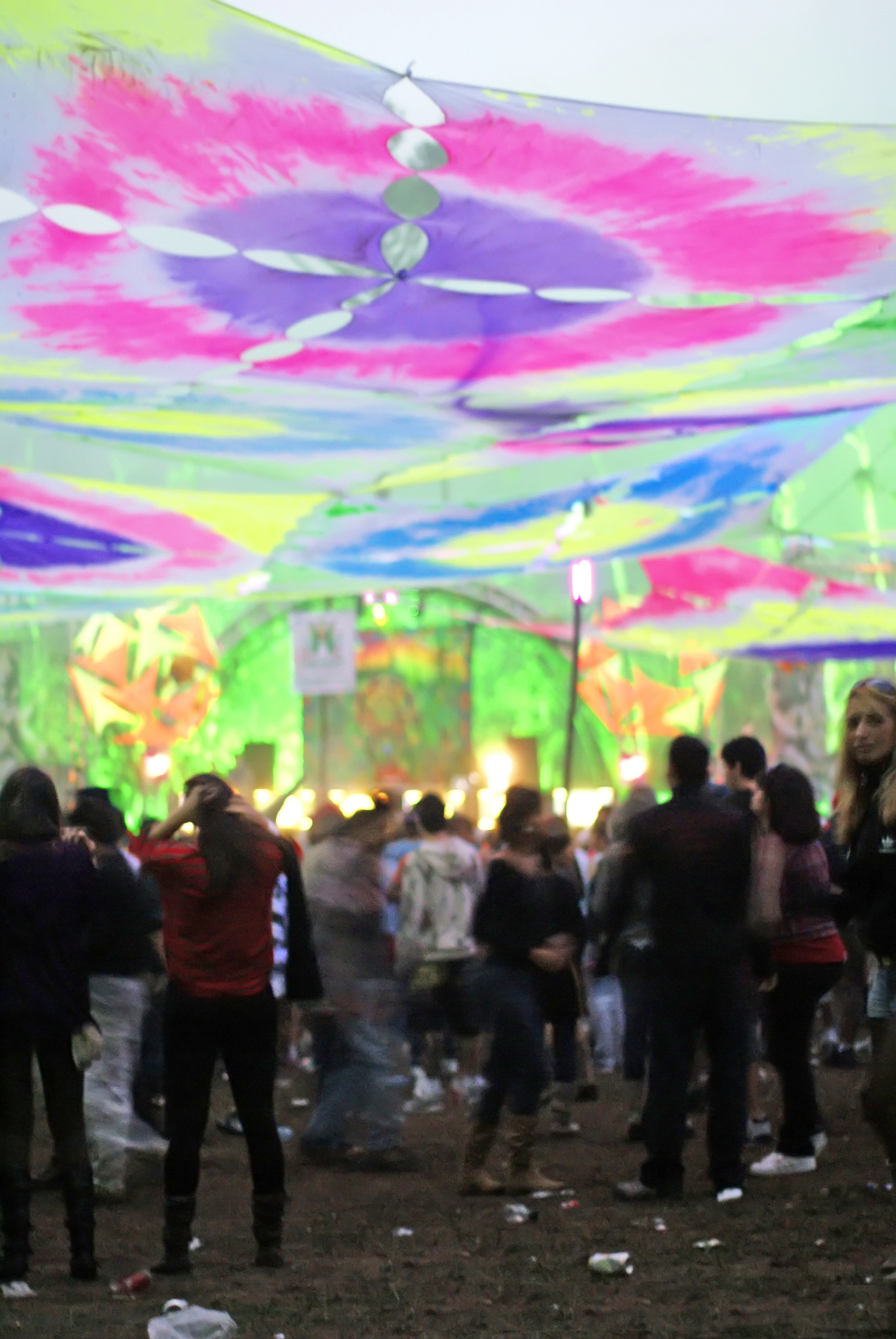
Rave – Juiz de Fora – MG, featuring bright psychedelic theming common at many raves

In the mid to late 1980s, a wave of psychedelic and other electronic dance music, most notably acid house music, emerged from acid house music parties in the mid-to-late 1980s in the Chicago area in the United States. After Chicago acid house artists began experiencing overseas success, acid house quickly spread and caught on in the United Kingdom within clubs, warehouses and free-parties, first in Manchester in the mid-1980s and then later in London. In the late 1980s, the word "rave" was adopted to describe the subculture that grew out of the acid house movement. Activities were related to the party atmosphere of Ibiza, a Mediterranean island in Spain, frequented by British, Italian, Greek, Irish and German youth on vacation, who would hold raves and dance parties.

=== Growth (1990s–present) ===
Dancing at a rave in 2007

By the 1990s, genres such as acid, breakbeat hardcore, hardcore, happy hardcore, gabber, drum and bass, post-industrial and electronica were all being featured at raves, both large and small. There were mainstream events which attracted thousands of people (up to 25,000 instead of the 4,000 that came to earlier warehouse parties). Acid house music parties were first re-branded "rave parties" in the media, during the summer of 1989 by Genesis P-Orridge during a television interview; however, the ambience of the rave was not fully formed until the early 1990s. In 1990, raves were held "underground" in several cities, such as Berlin, Milan and Patras, in basements, warehouses and forests.

British politicians responded with hostility to the emerging rave party trend. Politicians spoke out against raves and began to fine promoters who held unauthorised parties. Police crackdowns on these often unauthorised parties drove the rave scene into the countryside. The word "rave" somehow caught on in the UK to describe common semi-spontaneous weekend parties occurring at various locations linked by the brand new M25 London orbital motorway that ringed London and the Home Counties; it was this that gave the band Orbital their name. These ranged from former warehouses and industrial sites in London, to fields and country clubs in the countryside.

== Characteristics ==
=== Music ===
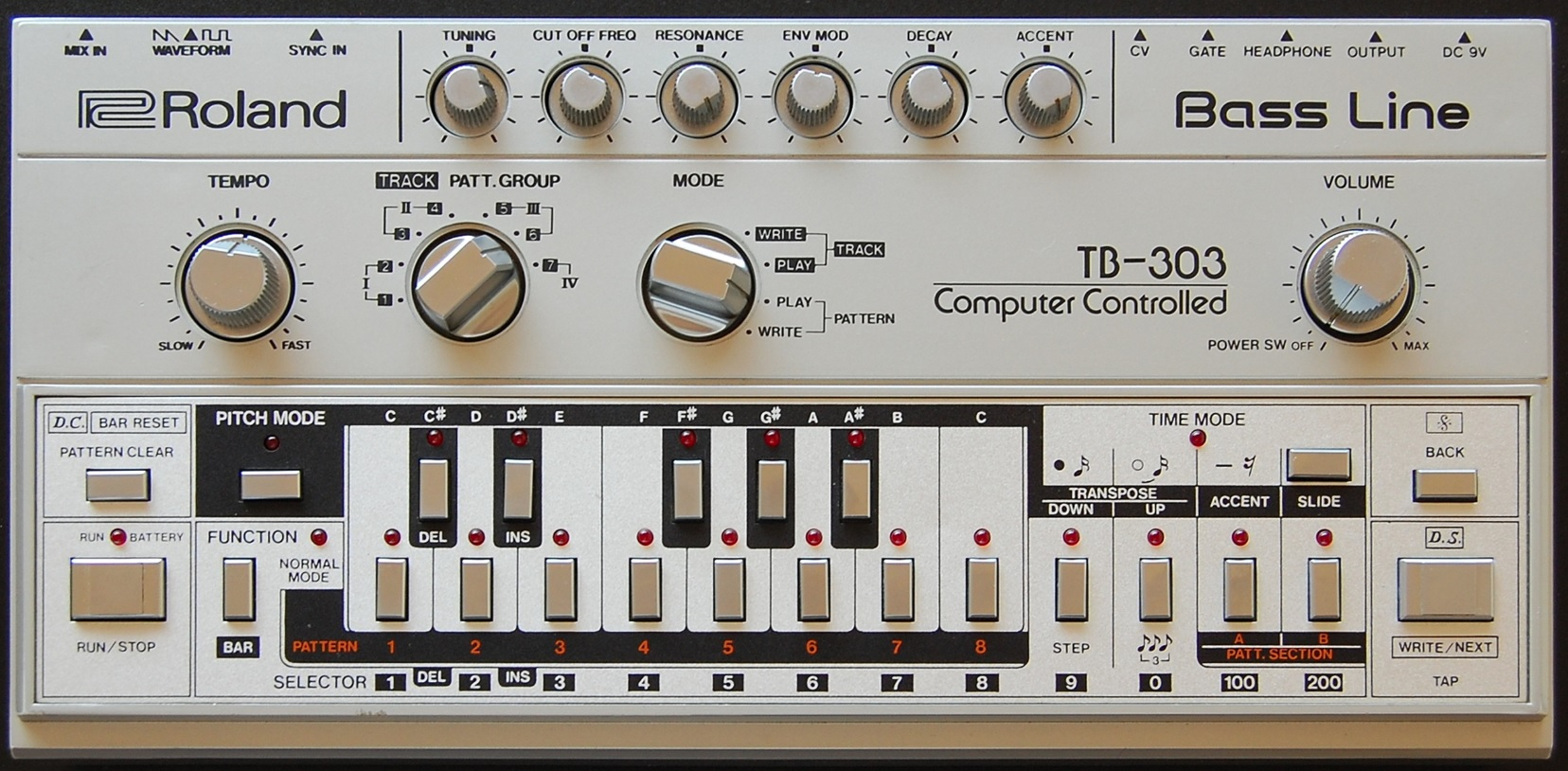
The Roland TB-303 is a synthesizer featured in acid house music.

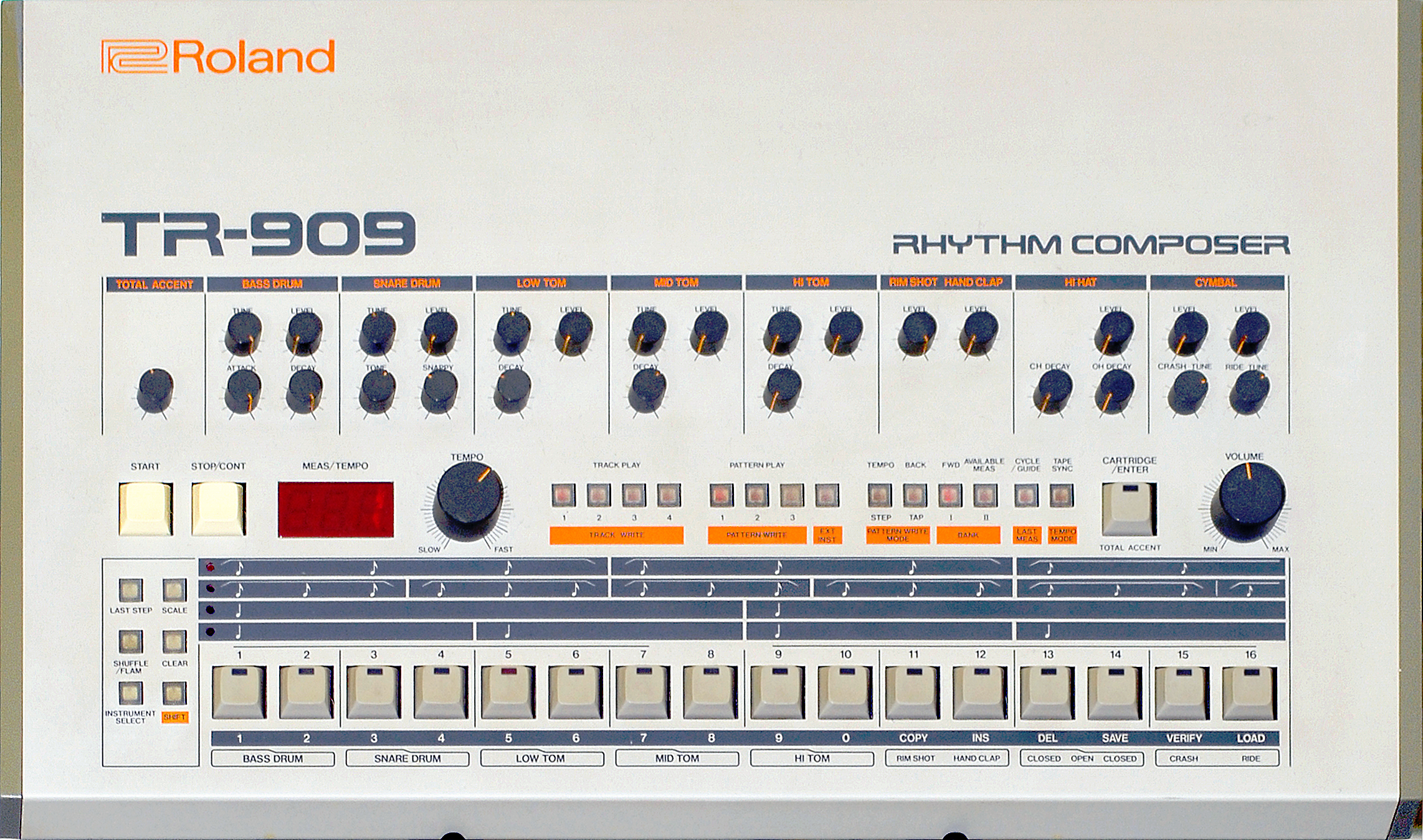
The TR-909 is a drum machine used in techno, house and many other genres.

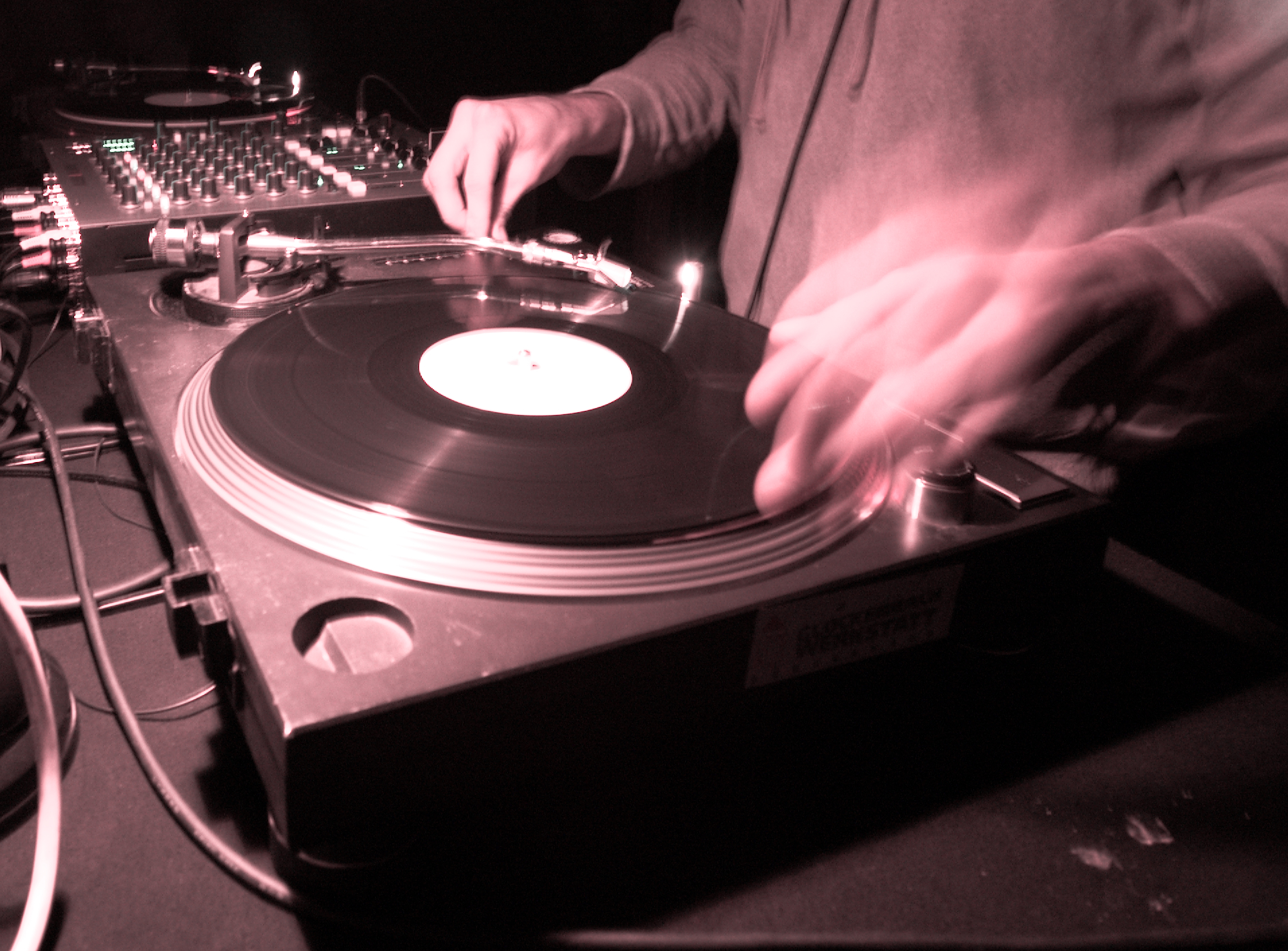
Rave music is usually presented in a DJ set, using a mixer and turntables or CDJs.

Rave music may either refer to the late 1980s/early 1990s genres of house, new beat, breakbeat, acid house, techno and hardcore techno, which were the first genres of music to be played at rave parties, or to any other genre of electronic dance music (EDM) that may be played at a rave.

The genre "rave", also known as hardcore (not to be confused with other "hardcore" music genres) by early ravers, first appeared amongst the UK "acid" movement during the late 1980s at warehouse parties and other underground venues, as well as on UK pirate radio stations. Another genre called "rave" during the early 1990s, was the Belgian hardcore techno music that emerged from new beat, when techno became the main style in the Belgian EDM scene.

The "rave" genre would develop into oldschool hardcore, which lead onto newer forms of rave music such as drum and bass, 2-step and happy hardcore as well as other hardcore techno genres, such as gabber and hardstyle.

Rave music is usually presented in a DJ mix set, although live performances are not uncommon.

Styles of music include:

- Breakbeat: Breakbeat music (or breaks for short) refers to any form of rave music with breakbeats, this may range from breakbeat hardcore to nu skool breaks, including genres such as hardstep and breakcore cross over into the hardcore techno sound. Fusions of house and trance also exist but the drum 'n' bass still remains the most popular form of breakbeat played at rave parties.
- Drum and bass: Drum and bass music refers to a music genre with a very specific sound of four significant notes called breakbeat, that serves as a bassline for the song – that's why most drum and bass songs use 170 – 176 BPM, most frequently specifically 174 BPM. Drum and bass includes multiple large subgenres, those who are frequently played at raves include liquid (known for harmonic vocals, less aggressive bass drops and emotional atmosphere), classic dancefloor (energetic and overall positive party music, sometimes even drum and bass remixes of popular songs), jump-up (a less complicated beat, sometimes using machine-like sounds, amplified for consumers of heavier music) and neurofunk (almost sci-fi like subgenre of a heavy and dark drum and bass, only rarely using well-known samples or even traditional music melodies).
- Electro: Electro and techno are two genres which largely featured psychedelic sounds and are largely considered the earliest forms of electronic dance music genres to use the term "rave music" in respect to its modern terminological use. Techno sometimes crosses boundaries with house music, hence the genres trance and acid techno. Miami bass and crunk is sometimes included as "electro".
- Free tekno: This style of electronic music started in the early 1990s and was mostly played in illegal parties hosted by sound systems, such as Spiral Tribe, Desert Storm, Hekate, Heretik, in warehouse, dismissed buildings, or even illegal open-air festivals, called Teknivals. It takes inspiration from various other genres, and mainly focuses on quick beats, 170/200 bpm, acid bassline, mentals sounds, and often samples taken from movies, popular songs or many other different media sources.
- Gqom: Gqom music, heavily influenced by techno and broken beat, features diverse rhythmic patterns, subgenres and styles. It incorporates drone sounds to create a hypnotic or trance-like effect. Taxi kick is occasionally tailored by some record producers particularly for illegal raves.
- Hardcore techno: Any hard dance genre that was influenced by the rave genre, usually these genres have a distorted kick drum and a 4/4 rhythm. Happy hardcore blended the Dutch hardcore sound with Eurodance and bubblegum pop, the genre (also known as "happycore" for short) featured pitched-up vocals and a less distorted 4/4 beat. Trancecore also exists and is a less vocal fusion of happy hardcore with trance music, however hardstyle is a more pure form of the trance/hardcore genre since it retains the hardcore sound.
- House music: House music, especially acid house, is the first genre of music to be played at the earliest raves, during the Second Summer of Love. House is a genre of electronic dance music that originated out of the 1980s African-American and Latino disco scene in Chicago. House music uses a constant bass drum on every beat, electronic drum machine hi-hats and synth basslines. There are many subgenres of house music (found below). Since house was originally club music, there are many forms of it, some more appropriate to be played at raves than others. In the UK, subgenres such as UK funky, speed garage and dubstep emerged from garage house. Many "pop house" club music producers branded themselves as "house music", however, so in rave culture it is often disputed whether pop house should be considered as a subgenre of house. "Rave house" is a subgenre label of house music that originated from the styles of house that were typically played in the rave scene of the 1993–1999 period. It is a term used by the general population who do not follow the house or trance scene specifically, but identify certain house records as "rave music". It is a loose term that generally identifies progressive house, hard house or trance house styles (often instrumental with no words) that one would imagine being played at a large rave.
- Industrial dance: Industrial is a goth/rock/punk related genre. While the genre is not usually considered rave music in and of itself, it is often fused with rave music genres. Industrial is the origin of many sounds found in rave music; it is one of the first genres that took the sounds that are now popular in rave music such as "acid" as its musical backdrop. Industrial music fans are usually considered rivetheads and do not tend to call themselves ravers.
- Trance music: Trance music in its most popular and modern form is an offshoot of house music that originated from the acid house movement and rave scene in the late 1980s. The history of trance music is complicated to refer to, as multiple generations of listeners and musicians have influenced the genre. The term "trance" was (and still to this day by many) used interchangeably with "progressive house" in the early rave years (1990–1994).

Downtempo and less dance-oriented styles which are sometimes called chill-out music, that might be heard in a rave "chill-out" room or at a rave that plays slower electronic music includes:

- Ambient, minimalist and computer music – Brian Eno, Mike Oldfield, Harold Budd, ATB, the Orb, Biosphere
- Dubstep and breakstep – Magnetic Man, Eskmo, and Burial
- Electro, glitch, techno, experimental hip hop and industrial hip hop – Flying Lotus, Juan Atkins, MARRS, Dopplereffekt, Egyptian Lover, Afrika Bambaataa, Techno Animal, Coldcut, the Glitch Mob and Kraftwerk
- Gqom tech, sgubhu and 3-step – DJ Tira, and Mr Thela
- IDM – Aphex Twin, Autechre and Boards of Canada
- UK garage and grime – Todd Edwards, Grant Nelson, Sunship, Wookie, So Solid Crew, Roll Deep, Dizzee Rascal, Wiley, Plastician

=== Location ===
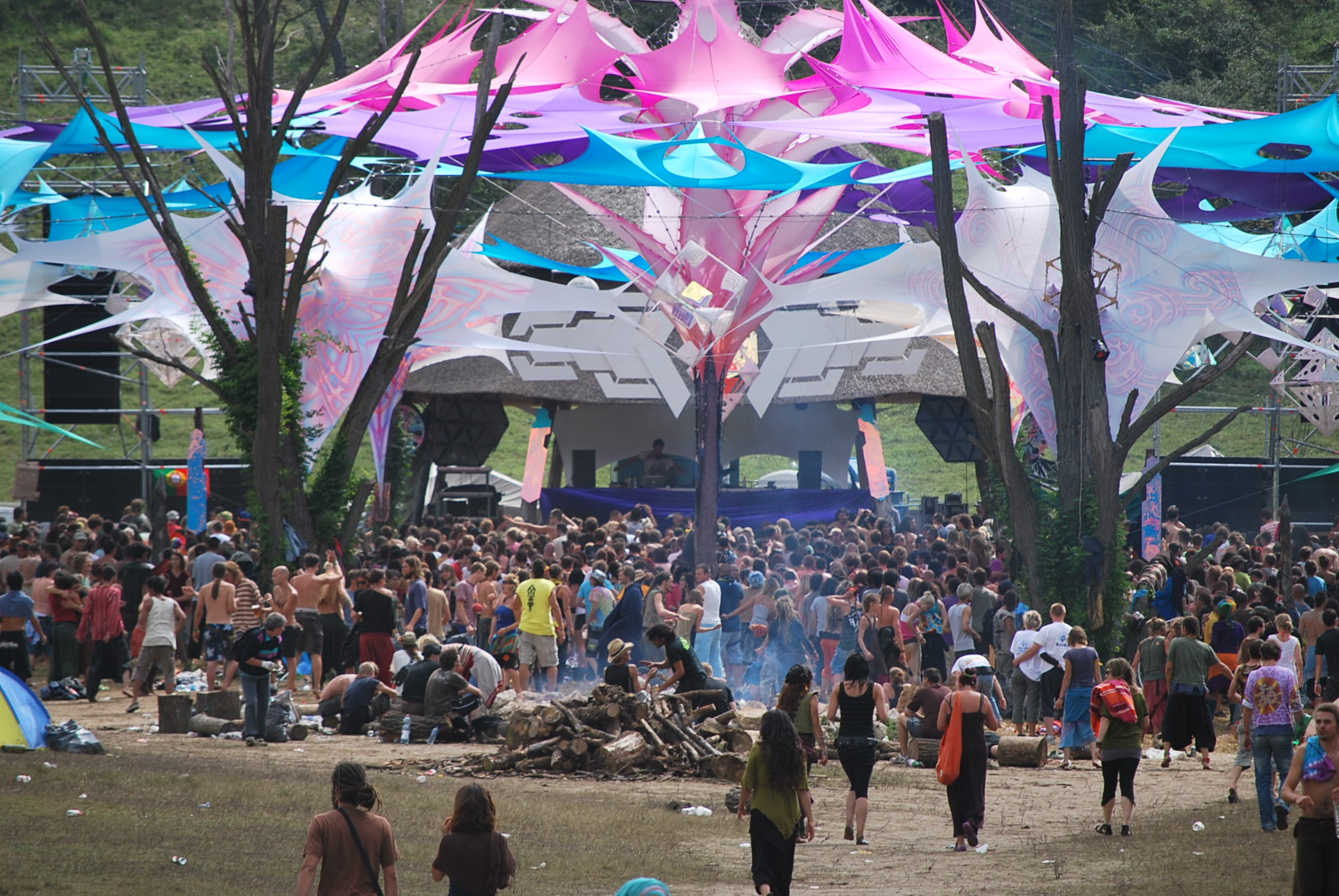
Rave in Hungary in 2010, showing the fantastical thematic elements at such events

Raves have historically referred to grassroots organised, anti-establishment and unlicensed all‐night dance parties. Prior to the commercialisation of the rave scene, when large legal venues became the norm for these events, the location of the rave was kept secret until the night of the event, usually being communicated through answering machine messages, mobile messaging, secret flyers, and websites. This level of secrecy, necessary for avoiding any interference by the police, also on account of the illicit drug use, enabled the ravers to use locations they could stay in for ten hours at a time. It promoted the sense of deviance and removal from social control. In the 2000s, this level of secrecy still exists in the underground rave scene. However "after-hours" clubs, as well as large outdoor events, create a similar type of alternate atmosphere, but focus much more on vibrant visual effects, such as props and décor. In more recent years, large commercial events are held at the same locations year after year with similar reoccurring themes every year. Events like Electric Daisy Carnival and Tomorrowland are typically held at the same venue that holds mass numbers of people.

Some raves make use of pagan symbolism. Modern raving venues attempt to immerse the raver in a fantasy-like world. Indigenous imagery and spirituality can be characteristic in the Raving ethos. In both the New Moon and Gateway collectives, "pagan altars are set up, sacred images from primitive cultures decorate the walls, and rituals of cleansing are performed over the turntables and the dance floor" This type of spatial strategy is an integral part of the raving experience because it sets the initial "vibe" in which the ravers will immerse themselves. This said "vibe" is a concept in the raver ethos that represents the allure and receptiveness of an environment's portrayed and or innate energy. The landscape is an integral feature in the composition of rave, much like it is in pagan rituals. For example, The Numic Ghost Dancers rituals were held on specific geographical sites, considered to hold powerful natural flows of energy. These sites were later represented in the rhythmic dances, to achieve a greater level of connectivity.

The Falls festival in Byron Bay features a rave party hidden behind a washing machine in a laundromat.

==== Notable venues ====
The following is an incomplete list of venues associated with the rave subculture:

- Asia:
  - AgeHa, Japan
  - Zouk, Singapore and Kuala Lumpur
  - Submerge, India
  - Womb, Japan

===== Europe =====
- Belgium:
  - Boccaccio
  - Café d'Anvers
  - Kompass Klub
- Croatia:
  - Papaya Club
  - Boogaloo Club
- England:
  - Angels (1989–96)
  - Astoria
  - Bagley's (later Canvas) (1991–2007)
  - Cream (1992–2015)
  - Epping Forest Country Club
  - Fabric (1999–present)
  - Camden Palace (1982–2004)
  - Gatecrasher One (1996–2007)
  - Godskitchen (1996)
  - Heaven (1979–present)
  - Home (1998–2001)
  - Koko (2004–present)
  - Konspiracy (1989–90)
  - Labrynth (1990–1998)
  - Lakota (1990–present)
  - Ministry of Sound (1991–present)
  - Mint Club (1998–2019)
  - Matter
  - Megatripolis (1993–96)
  - Popscene
  - Quadrant Park (1988–91)
  - Renaissance (1992)
  - Sanctuary Music Arena (1991–2004)
  - Sankeys (1994–present)
  - Shelley's Laserdome (1989–1995)
  - Shoom (1987–1990)
  - Sterns Nightclub (1991–1998)
  - The Academy (1990–2006)
  - The Eclipse (later Edge) (1990–1994)
  - The End (1995–2009)
  - The Emporium (1995-Still open!(Oct 2025))
  - The Fridge (1981–2010)
  - The Haçienda (1982–1997)
  - The Zap (1984–2005)
  - Thunderdome (1989–90)
  - Trade (1990–2008)
  - Turnmills (1990–2008)
  - Vague (club) (1993–1996)
- France:
  - Le Palace
  - Le Queen
  - Rex Club
  - Concrete (2011–2019)
- Germany:
  - Babalu Club (1990–1994)
  - Berghain (2004–present)
  - Bunker (1992–1996)
  - Dorian Gray (1978–2000)
  - E-Werk (1993–1997)
  - KitKatClub (1994–present)
  - KW – Das Heizkraftwerk (1996–2003)
  - Natraj Temple (1996–2008)
  - Omen (1988–1998)
  - Palazzo (1989–2003)
  - Stammheim (1994–2002)
  - Tresor (1991–present)
  - U60311 (1998–2012)
  - Ufo (1988–1990)
  - Ultraschall (1994–2003)
- Georgia:
  - Bassiani (2014–present)
  - KHIDI
  - Mtkvarze (2012–present)
- Greece:
  - Cavo Paradiso Club Mykonos (1993–present)
- Ireland:
  - Sir Henry's
- Netherlands:
  - iT (1989–2004)
  - RoXY (1987–1999)
  - Parkzicht (1990–1997)
- Poland:
  - Ekwador (1998–2014, 2015–present)
- Romania:
  - Guesthouse (1998–2014, 2015–present)
- Russia:
  - Quadro (1995–2004)
- Scotland:
  - The Arches (1991–2015)
  - Hangar 13 (1993–95)
  - Sub Club (1987–present)
  - The Tunnel (1990–2014)
- Slovakia:
  - Subclub
- Slovenia:
  - Ambasada Gavioli
- Spain:
  - Amnesia (1976–present)
  - Cream Ibiza
  - DC10
  - Pacha Group (1967–present)
  - Privilege Ibiza (1978–present)
  - Sankeys
  - Space Ibiza (1986–2016)
  - Fabrik (2003–present)
- Sweden:
  - Docklands (1995–2002)
- Ukraine:
  - Bingo
  - Cinema Club
  - Disco 2000

===== Middle East =====
- Egypt:
  - Space Sharm
- Israel:
  - Haoman 17
- Lebanon:
  - B 018

===== North America =====
- Canada:
  - 23 Hop (1990–1995)
  - Industry nightclub (1996–2000)
  - Stereo nightclub
  - System Soundbar (1999–2005)
  - The Comfort Zone (1996–2017)
  - The Guvernment (1996–2015)
  - Turbo Niteclub (2000–2003)
- Mexico:
  - Magic Circus
- United States:
  - Aahz/Beacham Theater (1988–1994)
  - Catacombs Nightclub Philadelphia (1978–1986)
  - Club Glow
  - Club Zanzibar (1979–1993)
  - Masterdome (1996–2001)
  - Paradise Garage (1977–1987)
  - The Saint (1980–1988)
  - Shulertown (Fayetteville, AR) (1994–2000)
  - Tunnel (1986–2001)
  - Warehouse (1977–1987)

===== Oceania =====
- Australia:
  - Club Filter Melbourne
  - Home (nightclub chain)
  - Mansion nightclub
  - HellFire nightclub
- New Zealand:
  - The Palladium Niteclub

=== Dancing ===
T-step of the Melbourne Shuffle

A sense of participation in a group event is among the chief appeals of rave music and dancing to pulsating beats is its immediate outlet. Raving in itself is a syllabus-free dance, whereby the movements are not predefined and the dance is performed randomly, dancers take immediate inspiration from the music, their mood and watching other people dancing. Thus, the electronic, rave and club dances, also known as Post-Internet Dances refer to the street dance styles that evolved alongside electronic music culture.

A common feature shared by all these dances, along with being originated at clubs, raves and music festivals around the world and in different years, is that when YouTube and other social media started to become popular (around 2006), these dances began to be popularised by videos of raves.

- Hakken
- Melbourne Shuffle
- Gloving
- Glowsticking
- Jumpstyle
- Electro dance
- Rebolation

=== Attire ===
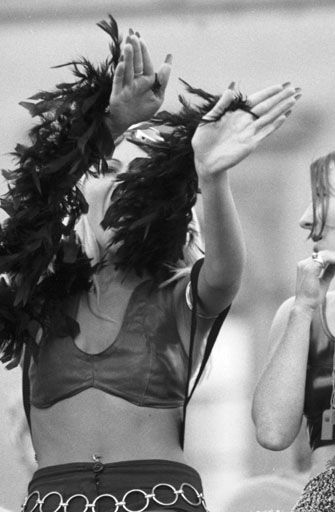
Raver with feather boa in Germany (1998)

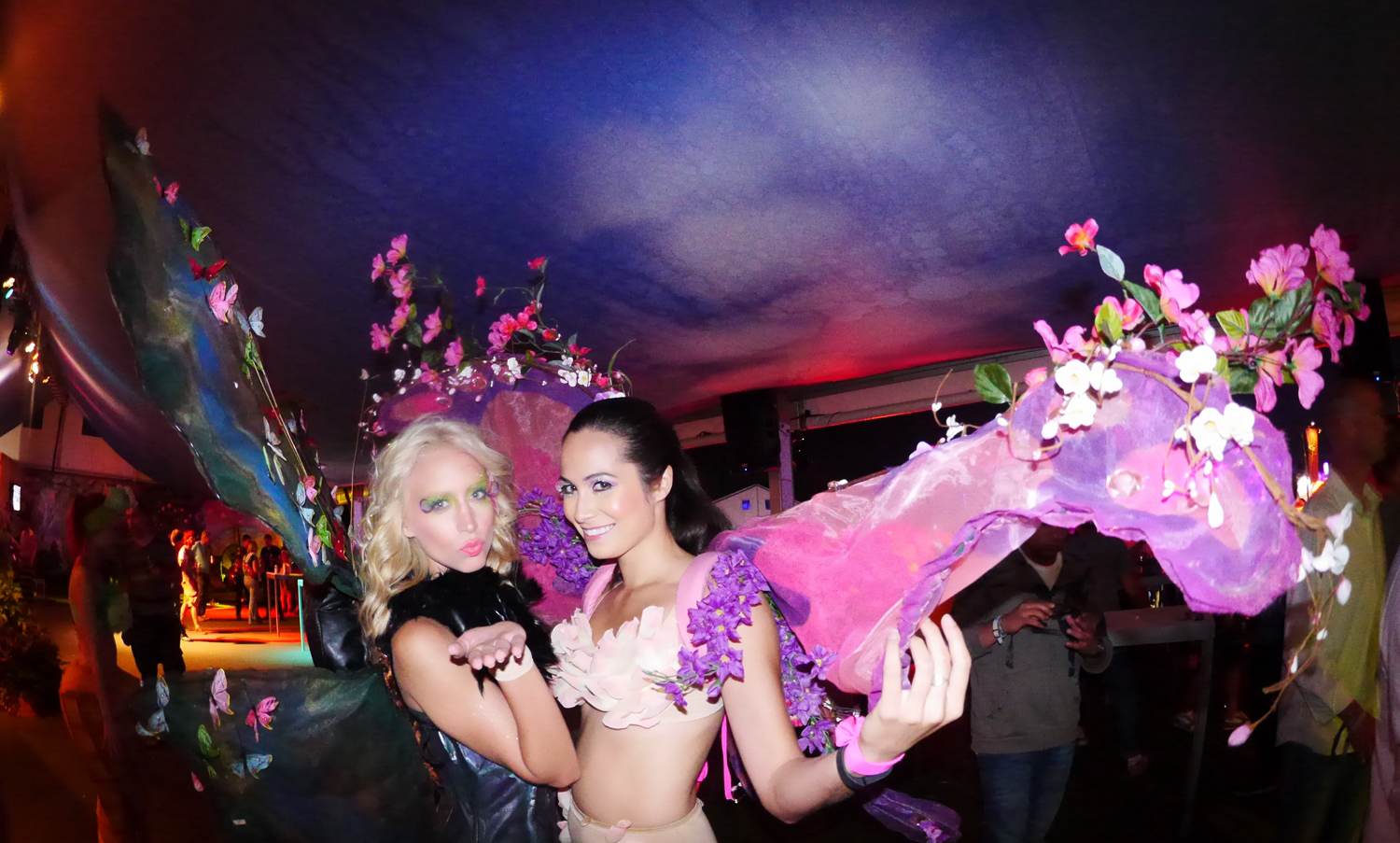
Fairy fashion rave wear (2013)

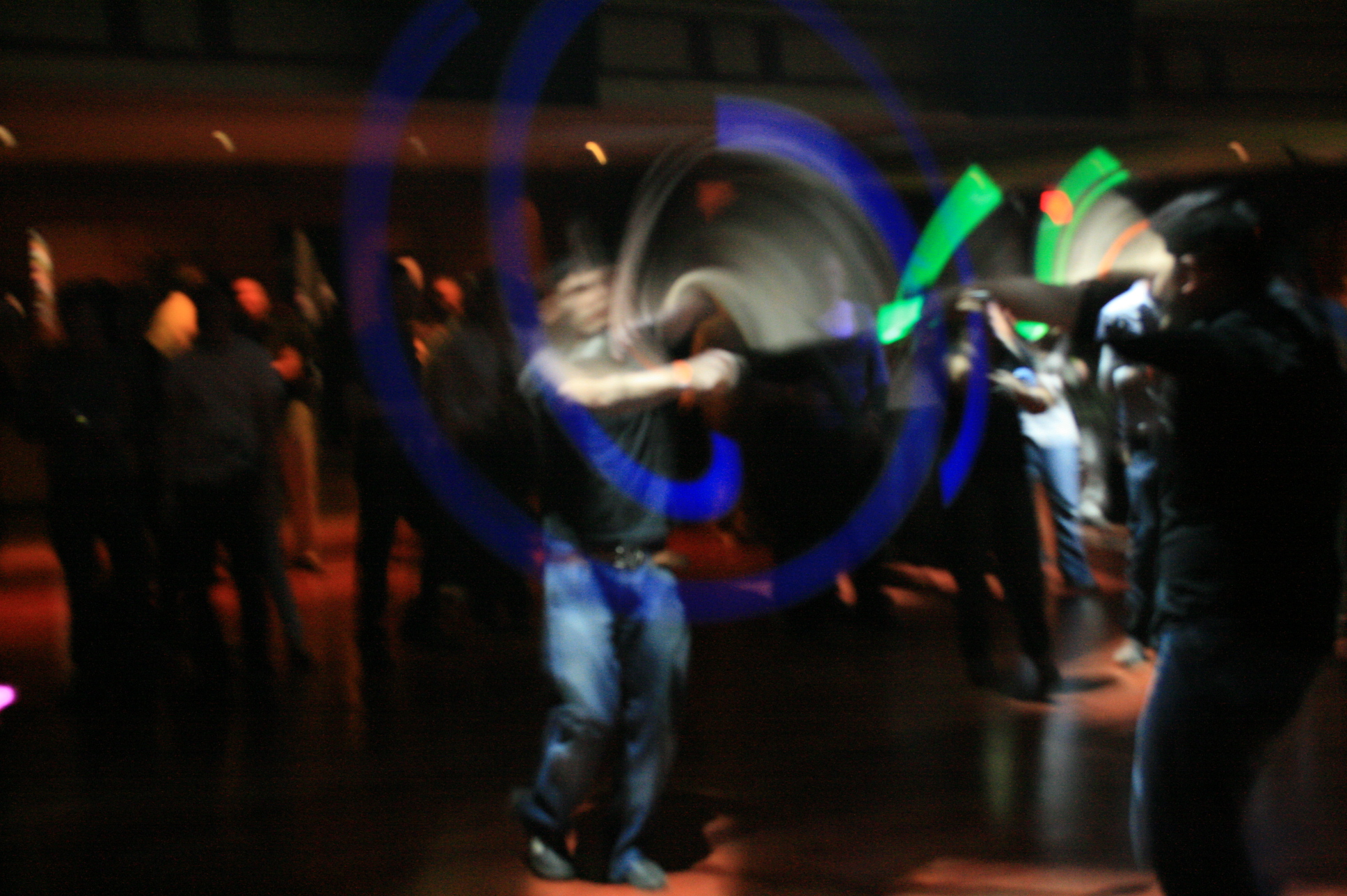
Glowsticking in the United States (2008)

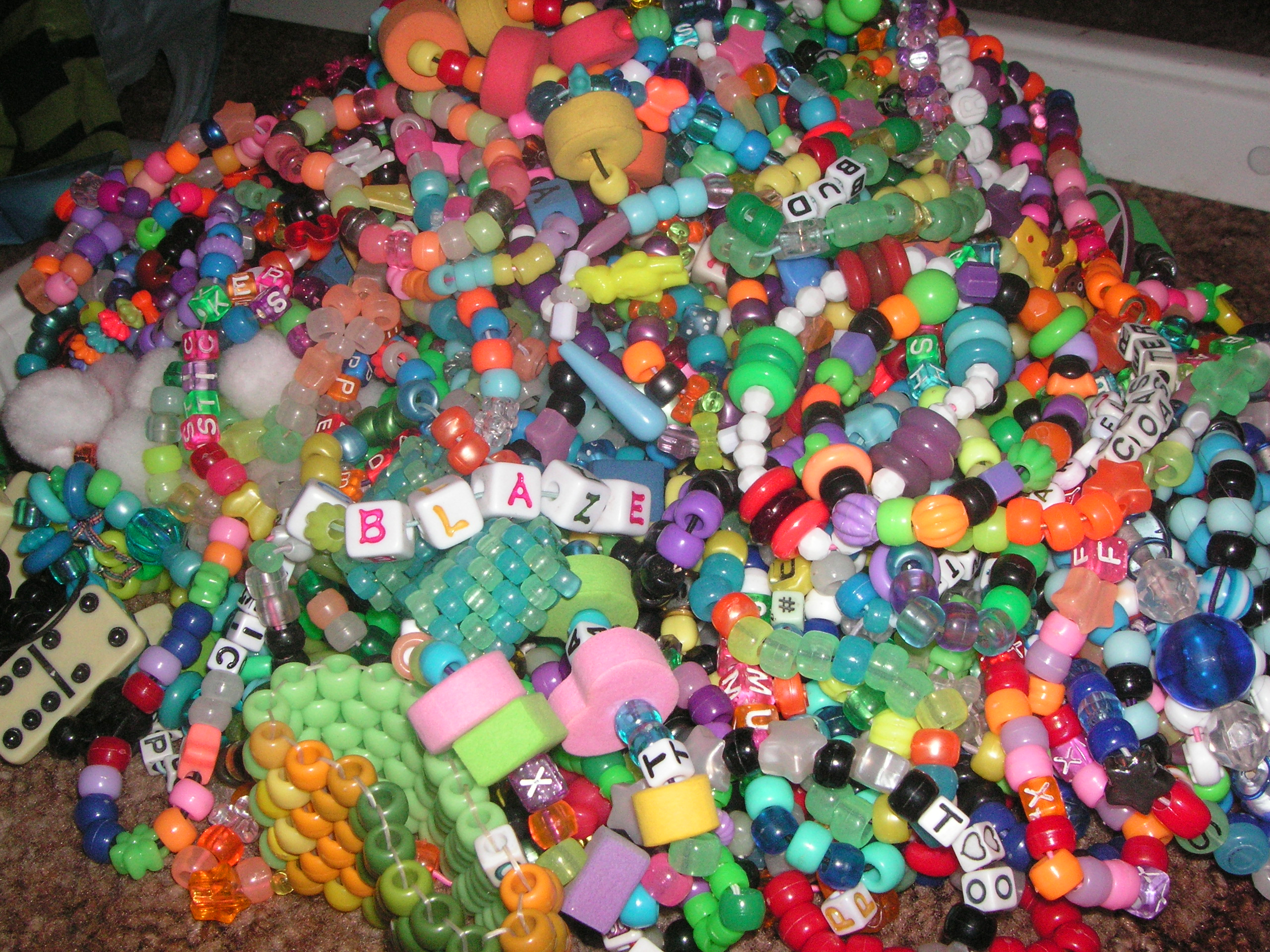
A collection of handmade bracelets known as Kandi bracelets

Since the late 1980s, rave fashion has undergone constant evolution with each new generation of ravers. Many of the rave fashion trends have appeared internationally, but there were also individual developments from region to region and from scene to scene.

At early rave parties, often costume-like clothes and garments with signal color look such as protective suits, safety vests, dust and gas masks were worn and combined with accessories such as vacuum cleaners or cyberpunk inspired goggles. Clothing with slogans such as "Peace, Love, Unity" and smiley-face T-shirts first appeared with the acid house movement of the 1980s. Further popular themes of the early rave scene were plastic aesthetics, various fetish styles, DIY, 1970s, second-hand optics, retro sportswear (such as Adidas tracksuits), sex (showing much skin and nudity, e.g. wearing transparent or crop tops), war (e.g. in the form of combat boots or camouflage trousers), and science fiction.

Common fashion styles of the 1990s include tight-fitting nylon shirts, tight nylon quilted vests, bell-bottoms, neoprene jackets, studded belts, platform shoes, jackets, scarves and bags made of flokati fur, fluffy boots and phat pants, often in bright and neon colours. Also gaudy coloured hair, dreadlocks, tattoos and piercings came into fashion with ravers. Widespread accessories included wristbands and collars, whistles, pacifiers, white gloves, glow sticks, feather boas, oversized sunglasses, and record bags made of truck tarpaulins. In the early 1990s the first commercial rave fashion trends developed from this, which were quickly taken up by the fashion industry and marketed under the term clubwear. Different dress codes also evolved in the various sub-scenes of the rave culture. For example, the typical gabber or psytrance raver dressed significantly different from "normal" ravers, but common basic features remained recognisable.

Since the 2000s, the clothing style of the rave culture remains heterogeneous, as do its followers. Particularly in North America, rave fashion continues to be characterised by colourful clothing and accessories, most notably the "kandi" jewellery that fluoresces under ultraviolet light. They contain words or phrases that are unique to the raver and that they can choose to trade with each other using "PLUR" (Peace, Love, Unity, Respect). This style of attire was again taken up by the fashion industry and marketed as "rave fashion" or "festival fashion", now includling all kinds of accessories to create unique looks depending on event. In contrast to this and starting at Berlin techno clubs like Berghain in the 2000s, a strictly black style, partly borrowed from the dark scene, has established itself within parts of the techno scene. Certain rave events such as Sensation also have a strict minimalistic dress policy, either all white or black attire.

=== Light shows ===
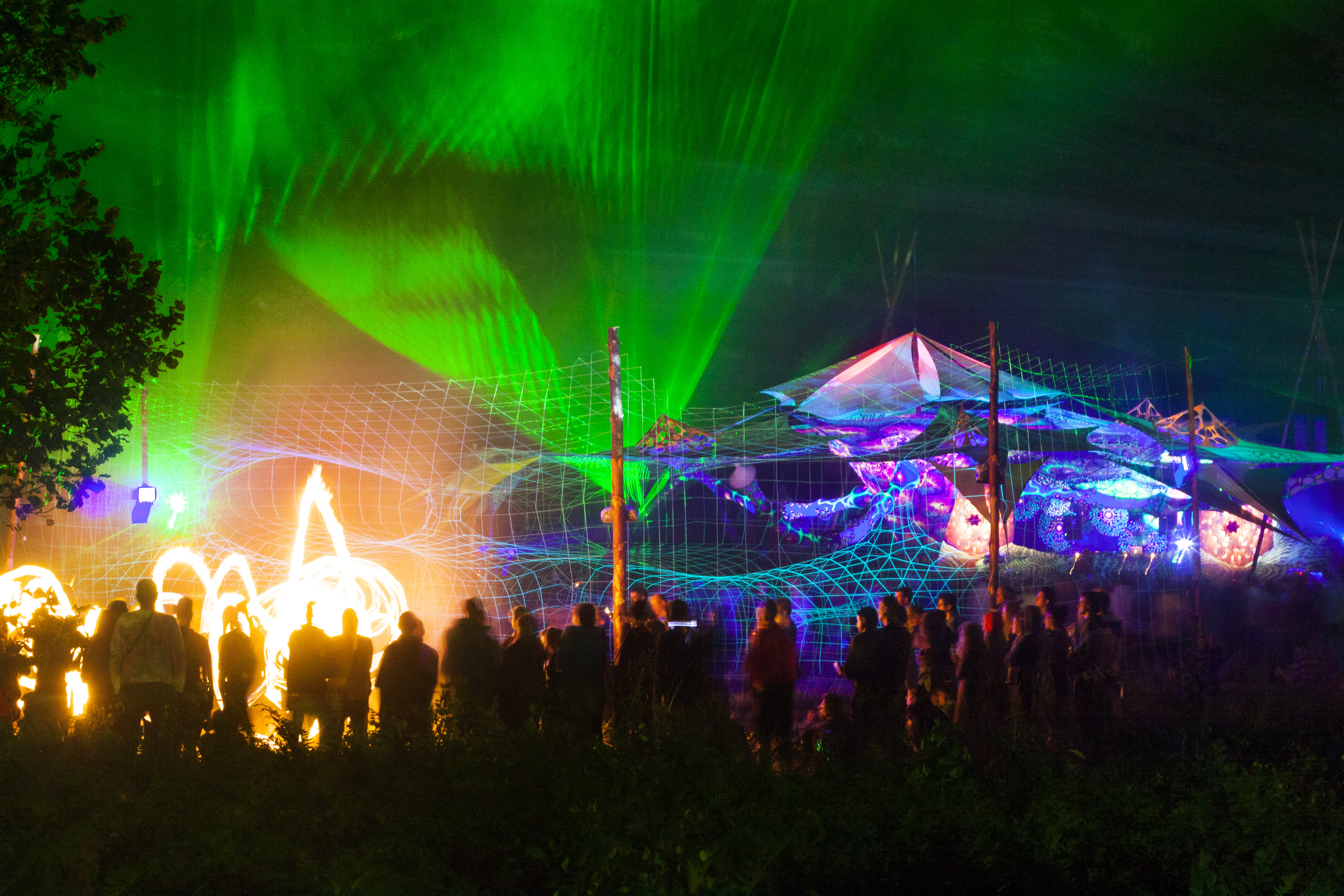
Laser lighting show at a trance festival

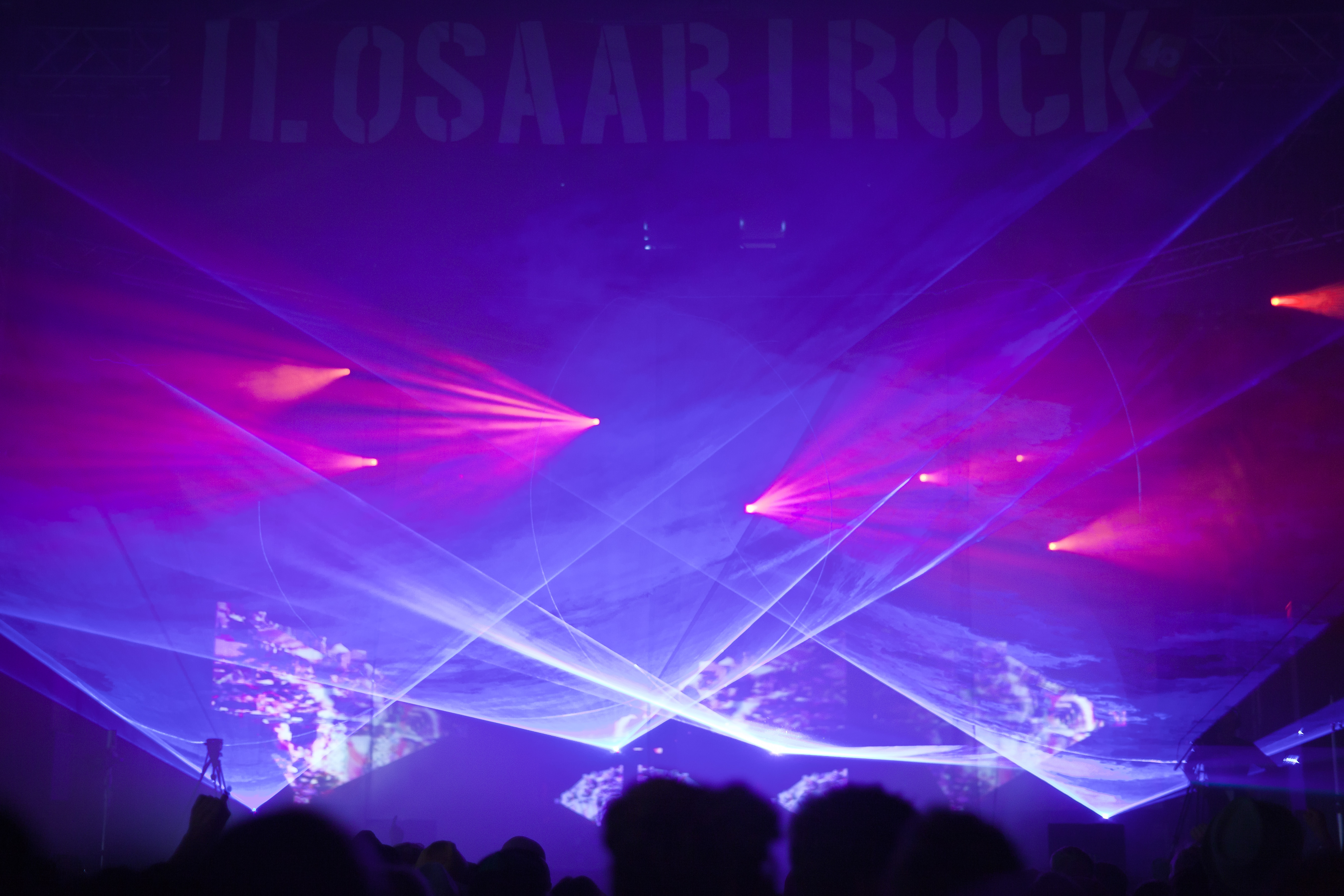
The light show for the electronic musician Aphex Twin in 2011

Some ravers participate in one of four light-oriented dances, called glowsticking, glowstringing, gloving, and lightshows. Of the four types of light-orientated dances, gloving in particular has evolved far beyond the rave culture. Other types of light-related dancing include LED lights, flash-lights and blinking strobe lights. LEDs come in various colours with different settings. Gloving has evolved into a separate dance form that has grown rapidly in the last couple of years of early 2010. Glovers use their fingers and hands to move with the beat of the music. And they use the color to create patterns and have different speed settings for the lights on their gloves. These components give the glove artist different ways to fascinate spectators of their light shows. The use of lights can improve the way people react during the songs or throughout the concert itself. Since then the culture has extended to all ages, ranging from kids in their early teens to college students and more. The traditional Rave lights are limited now, but many stores have developed newer, brighter, and more advanced version of lights with a plethora of colours and modes—modes include solid, stribbon, strobe, dops, hyper flash, and other variations.

=== Drug use ===
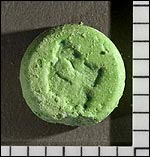
This impure tablet sold as MDMA in the U.S. contained no MDMA, but instead BZP, caffeine and methamphetamine.

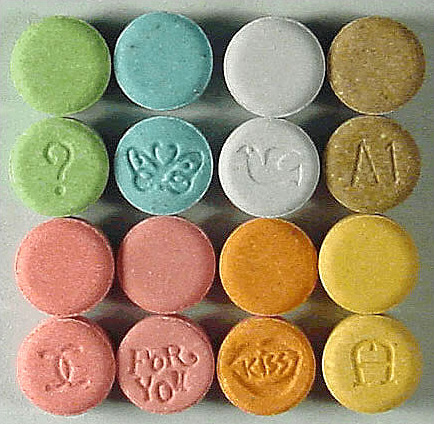
A selection of MDMA tablets, better known as "ecstasy"

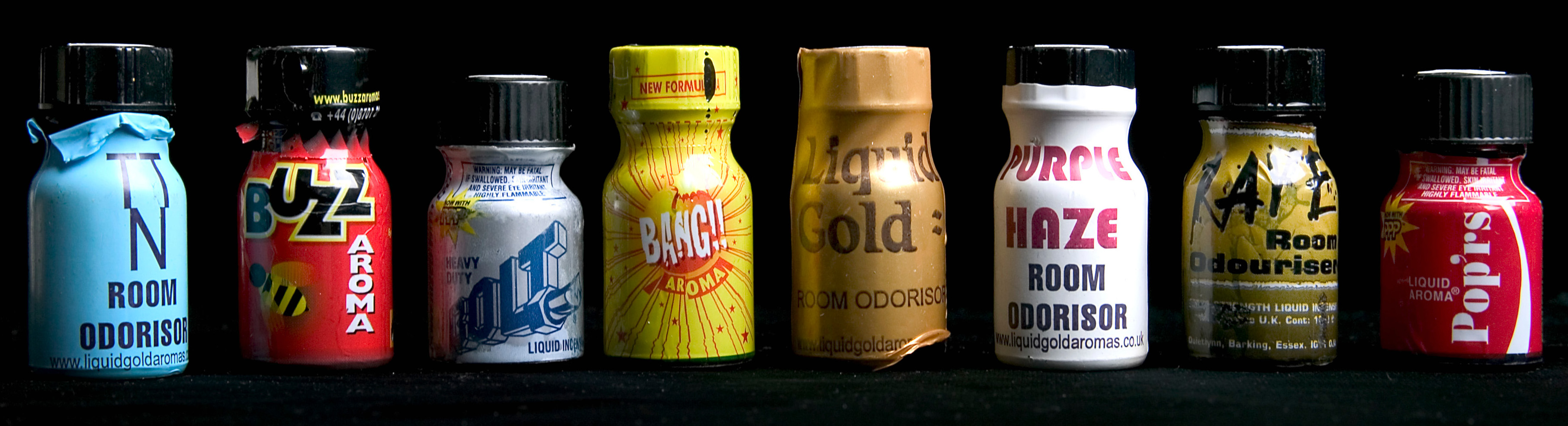
A selection of poppers, a volatile drug inhaled for the "rush" it can provide

Among the various elements of 1970s disco subculture that ravers drew on, in addition to basing their scene around dance music mixed by DJs, ravers also inherited the positive attitude towards using club drugs to "enhanc[e]...the sensory experience" of dancing to loud music. The state of mind referred to as "ecstasy" (not to be confused with the slang term for MDMA) sought by ravers has been described as "a result of when various factors harmonise the ego with the other elements such as place and music and [one] enter[s] a "one state" where [they] cannot distinguish what is material or not, where things enter into syntony and constitute a unique moment, precisely the kind sought in medi[t]ation".

However, disco dancers and ravers preferred different drugs. Whereas 1970s disco scene members preferred cocaine and the depressant/sedative Quaaludes, ravers preferred MDMA, 2C-B, amphetamine, and other pills. According to the FBI, raves are one of the most popular venues where club drugs are distributed, and as such feature a prominent drug subculture. Club drugs include MDMA (more commonly known as "ecstasy", "E" or "molly"), 2C-B (more commonly known as "nexus"), amphetamine (commonly referred to as "speed"), GHB (commonly referred to as "fantasy" or "liquid E"), cocaine (commonly referred to as "coke"), DMT, and LSD (commonly referred to as "lucy" or "acid").

"Poppers" is the street name for alkyl nitrites (the most well-known being amyl nitrite), which are inhaled for their intoxicating effects, notably the "rush" or "high" they can provide. Nitrites originally came as small glass capsules that were popped open, which led to the nickname "poppers." The drug became popular in the US first on the disco/club scene of the 1970s and then at dance and rave venues in the 1980s and 1990s. In the 2000s, synthetic phenethylamines such as 2C-I, 2C-B and DOB have been referred to as club drugs due to their stimulating and psychedelic nature (and their chemical relationship with MDMA). By late 2012, derivates of the psychedelic 2C-X drugs, the NBOMes and especially 25I-NBOMe, had become common at raves in Europe. In the U.S., some law enforcement agencies have branded the subculture as a drug-centric culture, as rave attendees have been known to use drugs such as cannabis, 2C-B, and DMT.

Since the early 2000s, medical professionals have acknowledged and addressed the problem of the increasing consumption of alcoholic drinks and club drugs (such as MDMA, cocaine, rohypnol, GHB, ketamine, PCP, LSD, and methamphetamine) associated with rave culture among adolescents and young adults in the Western world. Studies have shown that adolescents are more likely than young adults to use multiple drugs, and the consumption of club drugs is highly associated with the presence of criminal behaviors and recent alcohol abuse or dependence. In May 2007, Antonio Maria Costa, executive director of the United Nations Office on Drugs and Crime, advocated drug testing on highways as a countermeasure against drug use at raves. Much of the controversy, moral panic, and law enforcement attention directed at rave culture and its association with drug use may be due to reports of drug overdoses (particularly MDMA) at raves, concerts, and festivals.

== History by country ==
=== Belgium ===
The Belgian rave scene and sound have their roots in the late 1980s Belgian EBM and New Beat scenes.

Originally created by DJs slowing down gay Hi-NRG 45 rpm records to 33 rpm to create a trance-dance groove, New Beat evolved into a native form of hardcore techno in the 1990s with the introduction of techno records played at their original speeds or even slightly accelerated. This brutal new hardcore style spread throughout the European rave circuit and penetrated the pop charts.

The musical contribution of Brooklyn's DJ-producer Joey Beltram to R&S Records, run by Renaat Vandepapeliere, was instrumental in the development of iconic Belgian techno sounds and anthems.

=== Canada ===
Exodus Productions was arguably the first production company in Canada to throw regular rave style events at the warehouse space known as 23 Hop, located at 318 Richmond Street West in Toronto's Entertainment District. The first party was held on 31 August 1991. Multiple production companies would quickly follow suit, and the rave scene would soon explode into a massive scene, with 23 Hop as the initial launching pad, until its closure in 1995. The documentary film The Legend of 23 Hop highlighted the early stages of Exodus and similarly modelled production companies. Notable DJs that performed at 23 Hop included Moby, Mark Oliver, Dino & Terry, Sean L., Dr. No, Malik X, DJ Ruffneck, Jungle PhD, Kenny Glasgow, Matt C, John E, Danny Henry and David Crooke.

In 2001 Calgary, Alberta became the first major municipality in Canada to pass a bylaw with respect to raves. The intent of the bylaw was to ensure that raves would be safe for participants, and also not unduly disruptive to adjacent neighbourhoods. The bylaw was created in consultation with representatives from the municipality, the province of Alberta, and the rave community.

=== Germany ===
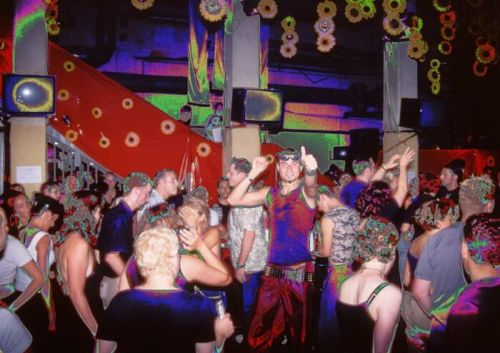
Ravers in a German techno club (KW in Munich) in the 1990s

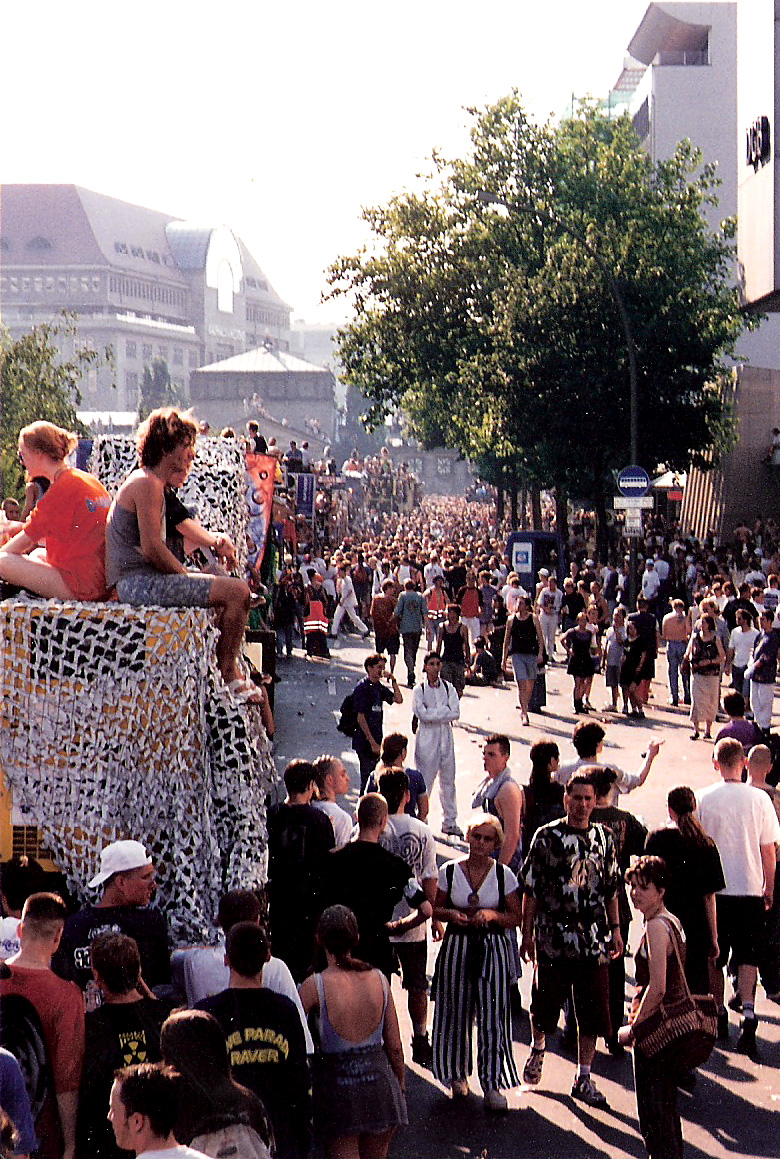
Love Parade 1995 in Berlin

In West Germany and West Berlin, a substantial acid house scene had established itself in the late 1980s. In the West Berlin club Ufo, an illegal party venue located in the basement of an old apartment building, the first acid house parties took place in 1988. In Munich at this time, the Negerhalle (1983–1989) and the ETA-Halle established themselves as the first acid house clubs in temporarily used, dilapidated industrial halls, marking the beginning of the so-called hall culture in Germany. In July 1989, the first Love Parade took place in West Berlin.

Immediately after the Berlin Wall fell on 9 November 1989, free underground techno parties mushroomed in East Berlin. According to East German DJ Paul van Dyk the techno-based rave scene was a major force in re-establishing social connections between East and West Germany during the unification period. Soon the first techno clubs emerged in East Berlin such as the Tresor (est. 1991), the Planet (1991–1993), and the Bunker (1992–1996). In Frankfurt, the Omen opened in 1988, which under its operator Sven Väth became the center of the scene in the Rhein-Main area in the following years. In 1990, the Babalu Club opened in Munich, introducing the concept of afterhours in Germany.

In the late 1990s, the venues Tresor and E-Werk (1993–1997) in Berlin, Omen (1988–1998) and Dorian Gray (1978–2000) in Frankfurt, Ultraschall (1994–2003), KW – Das Heizkraftwerk (1996–2003) and Natraj Temple (1996–2008) in Munich, as well as Stammheim (1994–2002) in Kassel, had established themselves as the most renowned techno clubs in Germany.

Parallel to the established club scene, illegal raves remained an integral part of the German rave scene throughout the 1990s. In urbanised Germany illegal raves and techno parties often preferred industrial sceneries such as decommissioned power stations, factories, the canalisation or former military properties of the cold war.

In the course of the 1990s, rave culture became part of a new youth movement in Germany and Europe. DJs and electronic-music producers such as WestBam proclaimed the existence of a "raving society" and promoted electronic music as legitimate competition for rock and roll. Indeed, electronic dance music and rave subculture became mass movements. Since the mid-1990s, raves had tens of thousands of attendees, youth magazines featured styling tips, and television networks launched music magazines on house and techno music. The annual Love Parade festivals in Berlin and later the Metropolitan Ruhr area repeatedly attracted more than one million party-goers between 1997 and 2010. Dozens of other annual technoparades took place in Germany and Central Europe in the 1990s and early 2000s, the largest ones being Union Move, Generation Move, Reincarnation and Vision Parade as well as Street Parade and Lake Parade in Switzerland. Large commercial raves since the nineties include Mayday, Nature One, Time Warp, SonneMondSterne and Melt!.

Since the late 2000s, Berlin is still called the capital of techno and rave, and techno clubs such as Berghain, Tresor, KitKatClub or Watergate and the way to party in barely renovated venues, ruins or wooden shacks such as, among many others, Club der Visionaere, Wilde Renate, or Bar 25, attracted international media attention. One movie that portraits the scene of the 2000s is Berlin Calling starring Paul Kalkbrenner. In the 2010s, there continued to be a vivid rave and techno scene throughout the country, including numerous festivals and world-class techno clubs also outside of Berlin, such as for example MMA Club and Blitz Club in Munich, Institut für Zukunft in Leipzig or Robert Johnson in Offenbach.

=== United Kingdom ===
==== Birth of UK rave scene (1980s–1990s) ====
The UK was finally recognised for its rave culture in the late 1980s and early 1990s. By 1991, organisations such as Fantazia and Raindance were holding massive legal raves in fields and warehouses around the country. The Fantazia party at Castle Donington, July 1992 was an open-air, all-night event. The Vision at Pophams airfield in August 1992 and Universe's Tribal Gathering in 1993 had a more festival feel.

By the middle of 1992, the scene was slowly changing, with local councils passing by-laws and increasing fees in an effort to prevent or discourage rave organisations from acquiring necessary licences. This meant that the days of the large one-off parties were numbered. By the mid-1990s, the scene had also fragmented into many different styles of dance music, making large parties more expensive to set up and more difficult to promote. The sound driving the big raves of the early 1990s had by the end of 1993 split into two distinct and polarising styles, the darker jungle and the faster happy hardcore. Although many ravers left the scene due to the split, promoters such as ESP Dreamscape and Helter Skelter still enjoyed widespread popularity and capacity attendances with multi-arena events catering to the various genres. Notable events of this period included ESP's outdoor Dreamscape 20 event on 9 September 1995 at Brafield aerodrome fields, Northants and Helter Skelter's Energy 97 outdoor event on 9 August 1997 at Turweston Aerodrome, Northants.

==== Free parties and outlawing of raves (1992–1994) ====
The illegal free party scene also reached its zenith for that time after a particularly large festival, when many individual sound systems such as Bedlam, Circus Warp, DIY, and Spiral Tribe set up near Castlemorton Common. The government acted. Under the Criminal Justice and Public Order Act 1994, the definition of music played at a rave was given as:

"Music" includes sounds wholly or predominantly characterised by the emission of a succession of repetitive beats.

— Criminal Justice and Public Order Act 1994

Sections 63, 64 and 65 of the Act targeted electronic dance music played at raves. The Criminal Justice and Public Order Act empowered police to stop a rave in the open air when a hundred or more people are attending, or where two or more are making preparations for a rave. Section 65 allows any uniformed constable who believes a person is on their way to a rave within a five-mile radius to stop them and direct them away from the area; non-compliant citizens may be subject to a maximum fine not exceeding level 3 on the standard scale (£1000). The Act was officially introduced because of the noise and disruption caused by all night parties to nearby residents, and to protect the countryside. However, some participants in the scene claimed it was an attempt to lure youth culture away from MDMA and back to taxable alcohol. In November 1994, the Zippies staged an act of electronic civil disobedience to protest against the CJB (i.e., Criminal Justice Bill).

==== Legal and underground raves (1994–present) ====
After 1993, the main outlet for raves in the UK were a number of licensed parties, amongst them Helter Skelter, Life at Bowlers (Trafford Park, Manchester), The Edge (formerly the Eclipse [Coventry]), The Sanctuary (Milton Keynes) and Club Kinetic. In London, itself, there were a few large clubs that staged raves on a regular basis, most notably "The Laser Dome", "The Fridge", "The Hippodrome", "Club U.K.", and "Trade." "The Laser Dome" featured two separate dance areas, "Hardcore" and "Garage", as well as over 20 video game machines, a silent-movie screening lounge, replicas of the "Statue of Liberty", "San Francisco Bridge", and a large glass maze. In Scotland, event promoters Rezerection held large-scale events across the country.

By 1997, the popularity of weekly Superclub nights had taken over from the old Rave format, with a raft of new club-based genres sweeping in (e.g. Trance, Hard House, Speed and UK garage) alongside the more traditional House sound that had regained popularity. Clubs like Gatecrasher and Cream rose to prominence with dress codes and door policies that were the polar opposite of their rave counterparts; stories of refused entry due to not wearing the right clothing were commonplace, but seemingly did nothing to deter Superclub attendance.

==== Illegal lockdown gatherings ====
In August 2020, following a proliferation of illegal gatherings, the British government introduced additional legislation allowing police to issue organisers of illegal gatherings with fines of £10,000.

=== United States ===
==== Origins in disco and psychedelia (1970s) ====
The American electronic dance music scene is one of the earliest, and rave culture has its roots in the "circuit parties" and disco clubs of the late 1970s. These were scattered in cities large and small throughout the United States, from Buffalo to Cleveland to Aspen, Colorado. Cities like Chicago, Detroit, Miami, and New York City soon saw the rise of electronic music genres foundational to rave culture, such as house music, techno, and breakbeat. American ravers, like their UK and European counterparts, have been compared to the hippies of the 1960s due to their shared interest in non-violence and psychedelia. Rave culture incorporated disco culture's same love of dance music spun by DJs, drug exploration, sexual promiscuity, and hedonism. Although disco culture had thrived in the mainstream, the rave culture would make an effort to stay underground to avoid the animosity that was still surrounding disco and dance music. The key motive for remaining underground in many parts of the US had to do with curfew and the standard 2:00 am closing of clubs. It was a desire to keep the party going past legal hours that created the underground direction. Because of the legality, they had to be secretive about time and place.

==== Growth in Chicago (1980s) ====
Within the early 1980s Chicago created "House music" and quickly grew with the city. This music scene has been one of the earliest and most influential scenes in dance music history. Frankie Knuckles also known as "Godfather of House Music" who was a dj-producer that was considered to have invented "Chicago House Music". He would mix a range of disco classics, indie-label soul tunes, European synth-disco that is now considered to be "House Music". Frankie played his house beats at The Warehouse (1977–1982) that was a club for members only, that attracted many black gay men but his music gained a wider crowd which then attracted straighter, whiter crowds. Leading its owner of the club, Robert Williams, to get rid of memberships entirely. Frankie left to create his own club called, "Power Plant" (1983–1985) which gained the attention of an entirely diverse crowd. He created his House music by using his own edits and extending the grooves within the tunes to keep the dance floor filled all-night. Ultimately, this phenomenon spread exponentially throughout Chicago during 1986–1987. Chicago house influenced music which is what created "House Music" in England during 1986 this is what grew into Electronic Dance Music today.

==== New York Raves and Party Promoters (1980s) ====
Rave culture's major expansion in North America is often credited to Frankie Bones, who after spinning a party in an aircraft hangar in England, helped organise some of the earliest American raves in the 1990s in New York City called "Storm Raves". Storm Raves had a consistent core audience, fostered by zines by fellow Storm DJ (and co-founder, with Adam X and Frankie Bones, of the US techno record store, Groove Records). Heather Heart held Under One Sky. Simultaneously in NYC, events were introducing electronic dance music to this city's dance scene. Between 1992 and 1994, promotional groups sprung up across the east coast.

==== Southern California and Latin America (1990s) ====
In the 1990s, San Diego held large raves with audiences of thousands. These festivals were held on Indian reservations and ski resorts during the summer months and were headlined by DJs such as Doc Martin, Daniel Moontribe, Dimitri of Deee-lite, Afrika Islam and the Hardkiss brothers from San Francisco. They helped to create the Right to Dance movement—a non-violent protest held in San Diego and later in Los Angeles.

Featuring local San Diego DJs Jon Bishop, Steve Pagan, Alien Tom, Jeff Skot, Jon-e Thin, Paolo, Merlyn, Gmaxim, Tony Fiore, Damon and Mark E. Quark performed at these events. The events used large props and themes. The fairy and pixie craze, with ravers getting fairy tattoos and wearing fairy wings to parties was associated with the region. The percussive group Crash Worship was active here.

In 1993 out of the Los Angeles underground rave movement came Moontribe the original Southern California Full Moon Gathering and featured Dj's Daniel Moontribe (aka Daniel Chavez aka Dcomplex aka Dcomplexity) and more.

==== Growth in California ====
In the late 1980s and early 1990s, there was a boom in rave culture in the San Francisco Bay Area. At first, small underground parties sprung up all over the SOMA district in vacant warehouses, loft spaces, and clubs. The no alcohol rule fuelled the ecstasy-driven parties. Small underground raves were just starting out and expanding beyond SF to include the East Bay, the South Bay area including San Jose, Santa Clara, and Santa Cruz beaches.

In late 1991, raves started to expand across northern California, and cities like Sacramento, Oakland, Silicon Valley (Palo Alto, San Jose). The massive parties were taking place in outdoor fields, aeroplane hangars and hilltops that surround the valley. Raves took place in some of the SOMA art museum event such as, 'Where the wild things are' in the museum on top of the Sony Metreon, and in the Maritime hall (1998–2002).

By the end of 1994, a new generation of ravers were attracted by the new sounds. EDM began to become popular. Raves could be found in many different kinds of venues, as opposed to just basements and warehouses. Promoters started to take notice and put together the massives of the late 1990s with many music forms under one roof for 12-hour events. Until 2003, the raves scene continued to grow slow and stay stable until there was increasingly awareness and publicity about illicit drug usage at raves, particularly ecstasy. Parallel to the rave scene growth, was an increase in anti drug policies, which were directly aimed and indirectly influenced rave organizational management and event. On 30 April 2003, the US Congress passed the Illicit Drug Anti-Proliferation Act, which has origins from a similarly purposed, but not passed, 2002 bill. That bill is notably named The RAVE Act. Consequentially, by mid 2000s and late 2000s larger raves appeared more sporadically. Nevertheless, and parallel to new city ordinances regarding curfews and drug enforcement, rave event promoter companies like Go ventures and Insomniac persisted and continued annual scheduled rave events like Monster Massive, Together as One, and Electric Daisy Carnival. From this base of routine and consistency scheduled events, the rave scene reemerged with in 2010 with even more attendance and dance locations. The overwhelming attendance, including from lack of underage attendance restrictions, reached a changing point with the 185,000 estimated in attendance 2010 Electric Daisy Carnival (EDC). That 2010 event gained widespread attention because of the death and overdose of a 15-year-old girl, Sasha Rodriguez. The death prompted an investigation of EDC's Insomniac's founder Pasquale Rotella. That investigation resulted in him being charged with bribery of public employee Todd DeStefano. At the time, DeStefano was the LA Coliseum event manager, which was the location of 2010's EDC. This in turn lead to a reorganisation of Insomniac rave events. For EDC in particular, while free on bail, Pasquale Rotella moved 2011's EDC from Los Angeles to Las Vegas from then on as well as increased the EDC scheduled locations. Rotella later reached a plea bargain and avoided jail time.

==== Seattle ====
Through the mid-1990s and into the 2000s the city of Seattle also shared in the tradition of West Coast rave culture. Though a smaller scene compared to San Francisco, Seattle also had many different rave crews, promoters, DJs, and fans. Candy Raver style, friendship and culture became popular in the West Coast rave scene, both in Seattle and San Francisco. At the peak of West Coast rave, Candy Raver, and massive rave popularity (1996–1999,) it was common to meet groups of ravers, promoters, and DJs who frequently travelled between Seattle and San Francisco, as well as Bellingham, Vancouver, Canada and Portland, Oregon. This spread the overall sense of West Coast rave culture and the phenomenon of West Coast "massives".

==== Recent years (2000s) ====
By 2010, raves were becoming the equivalent of large-scale rock music festivals, but many times even bigger and more profitable. The Electric Daisy Carnival in Las Vegas drew more than 300,000 fans over three days in the summer of 2012, making it the largest EDM music festival in North America. Ultra Music Festival in Miami drew 150,000 fans over three days in 2012 while other raves like Electric Zoo in New York, Beyond Wonderland in LA, Movement in Detroit, Electric Forest in Michigan, Spring Awakening Music Festival in Chicago, and dozens more now attract hundreds of thousands of "ravers" every year. These new EDM-based rave events (now simply referred generically to as "music festivals") sell out. Festival attendance at the Electric Daisy Carnival (EDC) increased by 39.1%, or 90,000 attendees from 2011 to 2012. In 2013, EDC had attendance of approximately 345,000 people, a record for the festival. The average ticket for EDC cost over $300 and the event contributed $278 million to the Clark County economy in 2013. This festival takes place at a 1,000-acre complex featuring a half dozen custom built stages, enormous interactive art installations, and hundreds of EDM artists. Insomniac, a US EDM event promoter, holds yearly EDC and other EDM events.

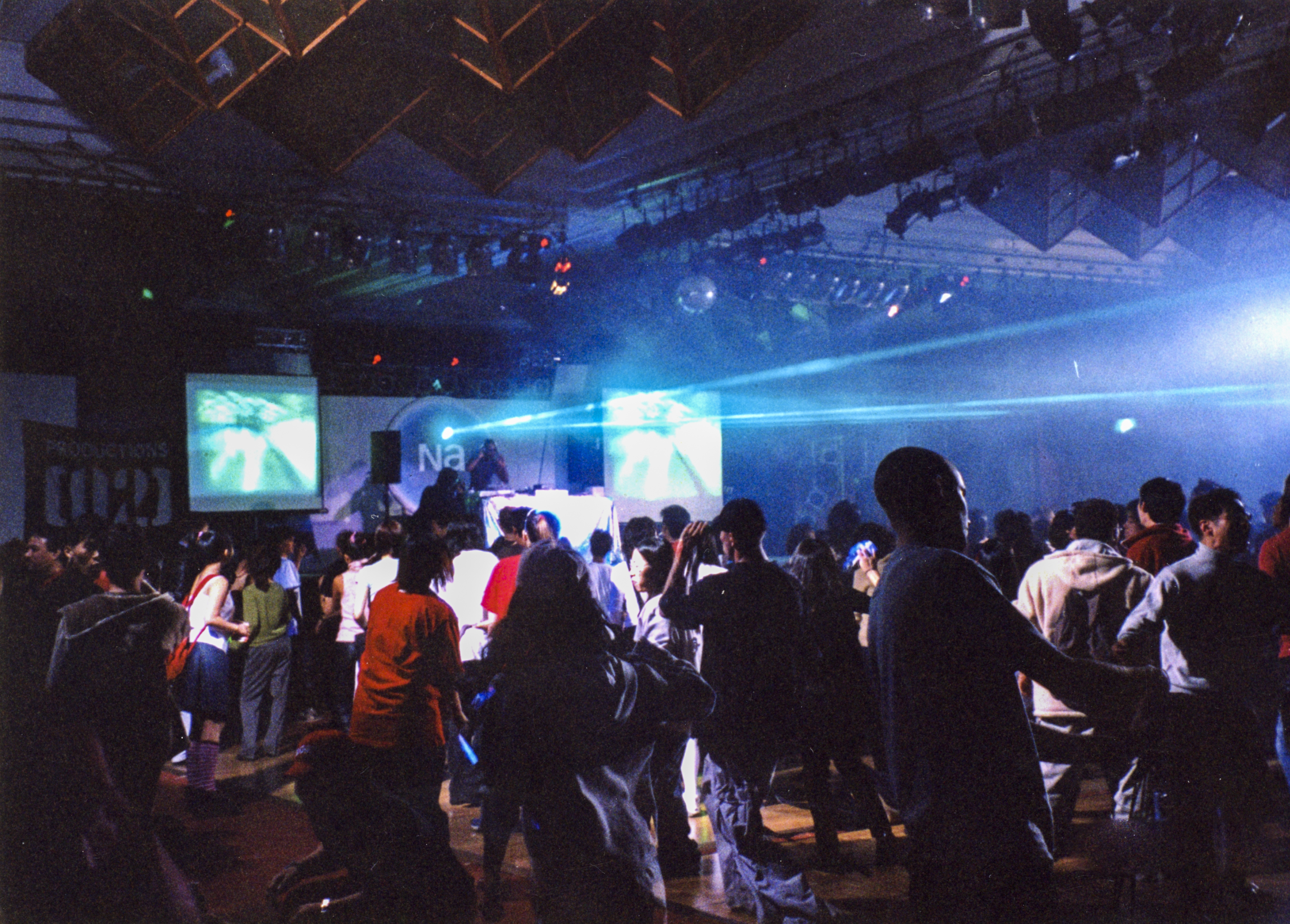
A Rave in Seoul, South Korea in 2001

=== Australia ===
==== 1980s and 1990s: outdoor raves and the Sydney scene ====
Rave parties began in Australia as early as the 1980s and continued well into the late 1990s. They were mobilised versions of the 'warehouse parties', across Britain. Similar to the United States and Britain, raves in Australia were unlicensed and held in spaces normally used for industrial and manufacturing purposes, such as warehouses, factories and carpet showrooms. In addition, suburban locations were also used: basketball gymnasiums, train stations and even circus tents were all common venues. In Sydney, common areas used for outdoor events included Sydney Park, a reclaimed garbage dump in the inner south west of the city, Cataract Park and various other natural, unused locations and bush lands. The raves placed a heavy emphasis on the connection between humans and the natural environment, thus many raves in Sydney were held outdoors, notably the 'Happy Valley' parties (1991–1994), 'Ecology' (1992) and 'Field of Dreams 4' (6 July 1996). The mid-late 1990s saw a slight decline in rave attendance, attributed to the death of Anna Wood at a licensed inner-city Sydney venue, which was hosting a rave party known as "Apache". Wood had taken ecstasy and died in hospital a few days later, leading to extensive media exposure on the correlation of drug culture and its links to the rave scene in Australia.

==== 2000s–present ====
The tradition continued in Melbourne, with 'Earthcore' parties. Raves also became less underground as they were in the 1990s, and many were held at licensed venues well into the 2000s. Despite this, rave parties of 1990s size became less common. Nonetheless, the rave scene in Australia experienced a resurgence during the 2010s. During this period the resurfacing of the "Melbourne Shuffle", a Melbourne club/rave dance style, became a YouTube trend and videos were uploaded. The rave subculture in Melbourne was strengthened with the opening of clubs such as Bass Station and Hard Candy and the rise of free party groups such as Melbourne Underground. In Melbourne, warehouse squat party and outdoor raves were frequently held throughout the 2010s, with attendance occasionally entering the thousands.

=== China ===
Underground raves and rave subcultures exist within Chinese cities such as Shanghai and Shenzhen, although the government has cracked down on clubs in the past as part of anti-drug campaigns.

== Notable events ==
The following is an incomplete list of notable raves.

1980s

- Storm Raves (1991)
- Rat Parties (1983–1992)
- Full Moon Party (1985–present)
- Winter Music Conference (1985–present)
- Genesis '88 (1988–92)
- Raindance (rave) (1989–present)
- Sunrise/Back to the Future (1989–1995)
- Real Bad (1989–present)
- Helter Skelter (1989–2004)
- Love Parade (1989–2010)

1990s

- Mayday (music festival) (1991–present)
- Fantazia (dance) (1991–97)
- Earthcore (1992–present)
- Castlemorton Common Festival (one-time event, 1992)
- Energy (event) (1992–2013)
- Thunderdome (music festival) (1992–present)
- KaZantip (1992–present)
- Street Parade (1992–present)
- Tribal Gathering (1993–2006)
- CzechTek (1994–2006)
- Bal en Blanc (1995–present)
- Rainbow Serpent Festival (1997–present)
- Scattered (rave) (1998–present)
- Mysteryland (1993–present)
- Dance Valley (1995–present)
- Amsterdam Dance Event (1996–present)

2000s

- O.Z.O.R.A. (2004–present, originally started in 1999 under the name Solipse)
- Cxema (2014–present)
- Tomorrowland (2005–present)

== Artists ==
- Acid house and Acid techno – 808 State, Guru Josh, Brian Dougans, the KLF, Josh Wink, Michele Sainte, Phuture, Luke Vibert, Acidwolf, Lone
- Breakbeat hardcore a.k.a. "Oldskool Rave" – Acen, Altern-8, the Chemical Brothers, Little Big, the Prodigy, Shades of Rhythm, Shut Up and Dance
- Brostep / Dubstep – Rusko, Skrillex, Flux Pavilion, Datsik, Chase & Status, Doctor P, Borgore, TC, Modestep, Feed Me, Kill the Noise, Excision
- Drum and bass / Jungle – Drumsound & Bassline Smith, 4Hero, Logistics, Andy C, Spor, Goldie, DJ Ron, Dieselboy, DJ Fresh, Pendulum, Freq Nasty, Freaky Flow, Shy FX, Rebel MC, Ragga Twins
- Drumstep – Excision, Dirtyphonics, Figure, Knife Party, Kill The Noise, Au5
- Future rave – David Guetta, Morten, Shapov
- Goa trance / Psychedelic trance – Ajja, Burn in Noise, Alien Project, Astral Projection, Electric Universe, Hallucinogen, Infected Mushroom
- Belgian hardcore techno a.k.a. "Rave Techno" – Channel X, Digital Orgasm, L.A. Style, Messiah, Praga Khan, Quadrophonia, T99, U96.
- Modern Hardcore techno styles – Happy hardcore, Acidcore, Hardcore house, Gabber, Frenchcore – Punish Yourself, Angerfist, Dune, Outblast, Scooter, Anthony Acid, Darren Styles, Pastis & Buenri
- Hardstyle and Dubstyle – Technoboy, Showtek, Headhunterz, Wildstylez, Brennan Heart, DJ Lady Dana, Blutonium Boy
- Liquid funk – Netsky, High Contrast, Fred V & Grafix, Fox Stevenson, Brookes Brothers, Rudimental
- Moombahton – Knife Party, Dillon Francis, Munchi, Diplo, Bro Safari,
- New rave – Klaxons, Hadouken!, Shitdisco, Trash Fashion, New Young Pony Club
- Speed garage and Bassline – Platnum, DJXP, T2

== Notable soundsystems ==
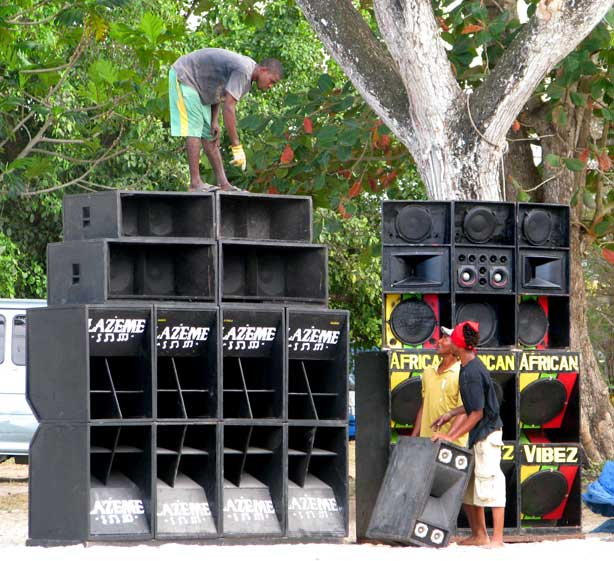
Audio technicians set up massive speaker enclosures for a Jamaican sound system party.

The following is an incomplete list of notable sound systems:

- Defunkt
- DiY Sound System
- Insomniac Events
- Spiral Tribe

== See also ==
- ArtRave: The Artpop Ball
- Computational musicology
- Electronic dance music
- Gospel music
- New Rave
- Outline of entertainment
- RAVE Act – An American law targeting raves.
- Rave Board Game – 1991 board game based on the UK Rave scene
- Rock music
- Responsible drug use § On festivals
- Zippies
- Cxema, organiser of raves in Ukraine
- Soul music
