= Rebolation =

Brazilian style of dance

Rebolation, from the Portuguese verb rebolar - "to sway" or "to swing",, also known as free step, is a style of Brazilian dance that originated in rave parties in the early 2000s. The dance, which gained popularity in 2007 after videos of people practicing the dance were uploaded to popular Internet video sharing websites, such as YouTube, is mainly performed to electronic music, often psy trance or electro house, and involves moving the arms and legs loosely while coordinated footwork makes the dancer appear to slightly hover above the floor.

== History ==
This step dance is considered by many dancers as the Brazilian version of the Melbourne Shuffle and Hardstyle. Originally pronounced as reboleixon, the word was defined as simply the dance of electronic music.

It is unknown which came first, but a similar type of dance that originated from Johannesburg, South Africa, called "stepping" or "skitting" began in 2006. Unlike Rebolation, it did not originate through video sharing websites, such as YouTube, although some dancers have posted videos on such sites.

One of the most popular YouTube videos of Rebolation was uploaded in 2008 by Ralph Morente with 11 million views as of 2023, which shows a young man dancing afloat-like at a roof terrace. The earliest YouTube video containing the dance was published July 15, 2008.

Furthermore, Brazilian dancers are said to have changed the name from Rebolation to Free Step after the reggae-influenced Axé music video Rebolation by Parangolé was released in 2009 The music video was neither connected to electronic music, nor the rebolation dance community, and was therefore considered to be altering the name.

== Characteristics ==
When dancing rebolation, several steps are used, and the main move is to "walk" putting a foot forward and using the heel as a pivot point to turn the back foot backwards, while the front foot is turned inwards around the heel. The reverse movement is used when walking backwards. This, when properly performed, gives the impression that the dancer is somewhat sliding on the floor, and the loose movements of the hands create the impression that the dancer is not totally in control of the direction of movement.

With regards to clothing, the most prominent feature is perhaps the famous bell bottomed “shuffle pants” or phat pants with neon details, UV reflective tape or glitter, commonly used in the rave community, or light-up shoes, however, most rebolation dancers seem to wear casual street-style clothing with flat tennis shoes or sneakers, aiding the dancer in moving across the surface smoothly.
