= Subclub =

Underground music club in Bratislava, Slovakia (1994–2019)

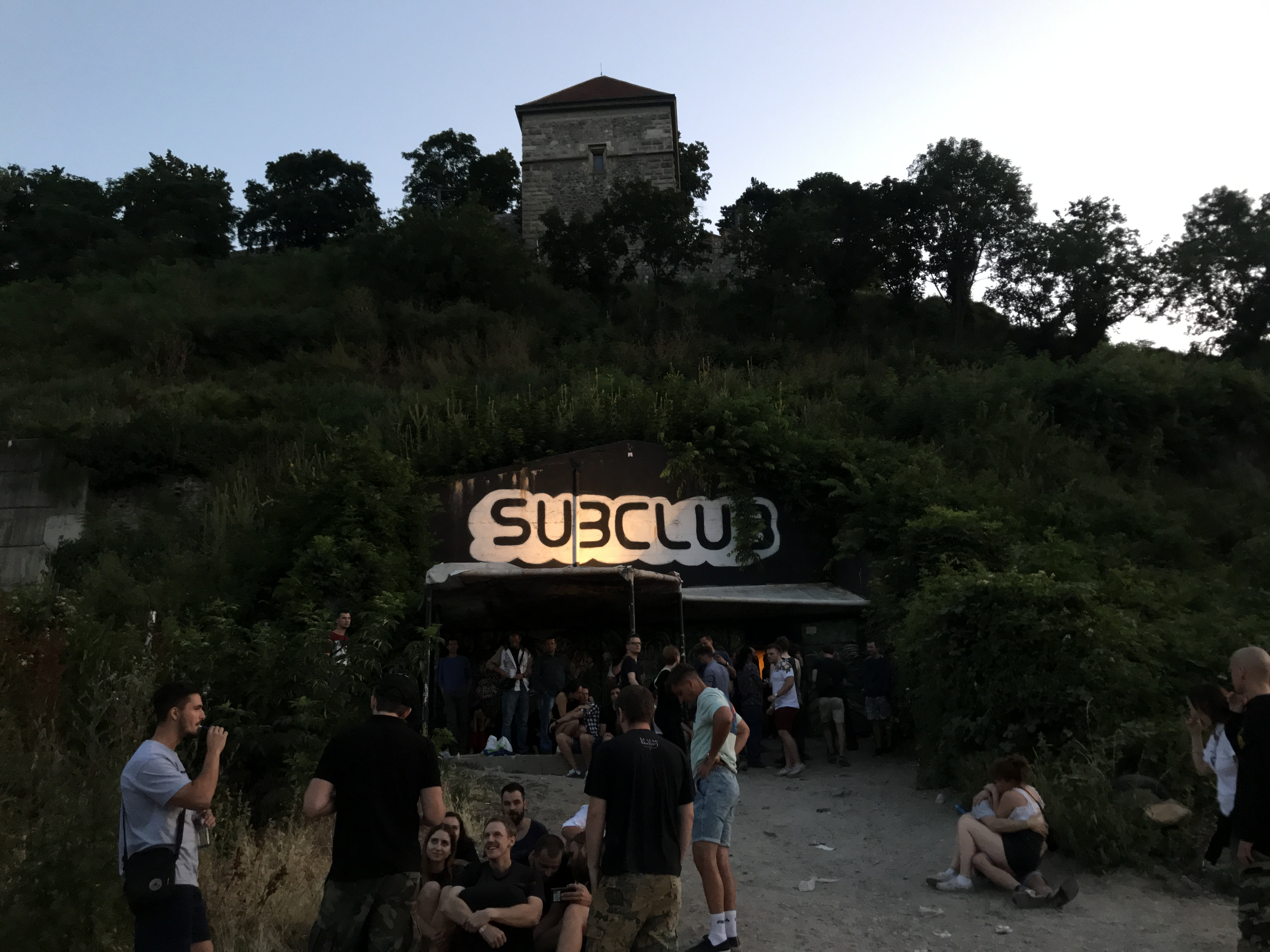
- Interactive map of Subclub
- Former names: U.club (1993-2003), Účko (2003-2005)
- Location: Nábrežie arm. gen. L. Svobodu, Bratislava
- Coordinates: 48°08′26.8″N 17°06′07.5″E
- Capacity: 700
- Type: Nightclub

Construction
- Opened: 1993 (as U.club)
- Closed: 2019 (as Subclub)

Website
- Subclub

Subclub (formerly also known as U.Club, from 1994 - June 28, 2003, and Účko, from 2003 - 2005) was an underground music club in Bratislava, Slovakia.

== History ==
Subclub was located in one of the many emergency military storage bunkers and tunnels stretching under Bratislava castle. The club was known for hosting alternative and electronic music nights, such as the well-known techno parties organized by Subtech (a famous techno booking agency, now known as Standa) during the 1990s. The club housed an extraordinarily wide range of other significant musical events in the city, including drum&bass, techno, minimal techno, electro, alternative rock, punk, metal, reggae, ska and crossover clubnights. Subclub played a major role in developing the Slovak techno sound of artists such as Toky (Rumenige), Loktibrada and DJ Boss and served as the base outlet for the well-known Bratislavian minimal electronic label LFB. The club, during the 26 years of its existence, also hosted famous DJs, such as Jeff Mills, Rødhåd, Marcel Dettmann, Surgeon and others.

Subclub closed its doors indefinitely on June 29, 2019, following The Final Hit farewell event. The club was closed because of new residential development in front of the club.

== See also ==
- List of electronic dance music venues
- Live electronic music
