= The Tunnel (Glasgow nightclub) =

Scottish nightclub

- Industry: Entertainment
- Founded: 1990
- Defunct: 2014
- Successor: Revolution bar
- Headquarters: Glasgow, Scotland

The Tunnel was a nightclub in Glasgow, Scotland that operated from 1990 until 2014.

== Location ==
The Tunnel was located on Mitchell Street, Glasgow.

== History ==
The basement club opened in 1990 and had a capacity of 1,100 customers. It was owned by CPL Entertainment Group and Hold Fast Entertainment group. The club was named UK Discotheque of The Year by the British Entertainment and Discotheque Association in 1995.

Resident disc-jockeys included Steven McReery, Colin Tevendale, Michael Silky Kilkie, Tevendale and McCreery, Lisa Littlewood, Simon Foy and Harry Miller. Guest disc-jockeys over the years included Tiësto, Judge Jules, Paul Oakenfold, Trevor Nelson, Roger Sanchez, and Danny Rampling.

The Friday night opening was known as Ark and Saturday night opening was known as Triumph. There was a monthly event known as Renaissance Night.

The club closed in 2014, and was bought by G1 Group and turned into a bar called Revolution.

== See also ==
- List of electronic dance music venues
