= Gatecrasher One =

Nightclub in Sheffield, South Yorkshire, England

Coordinates: 53.3761°N 1.4696°W

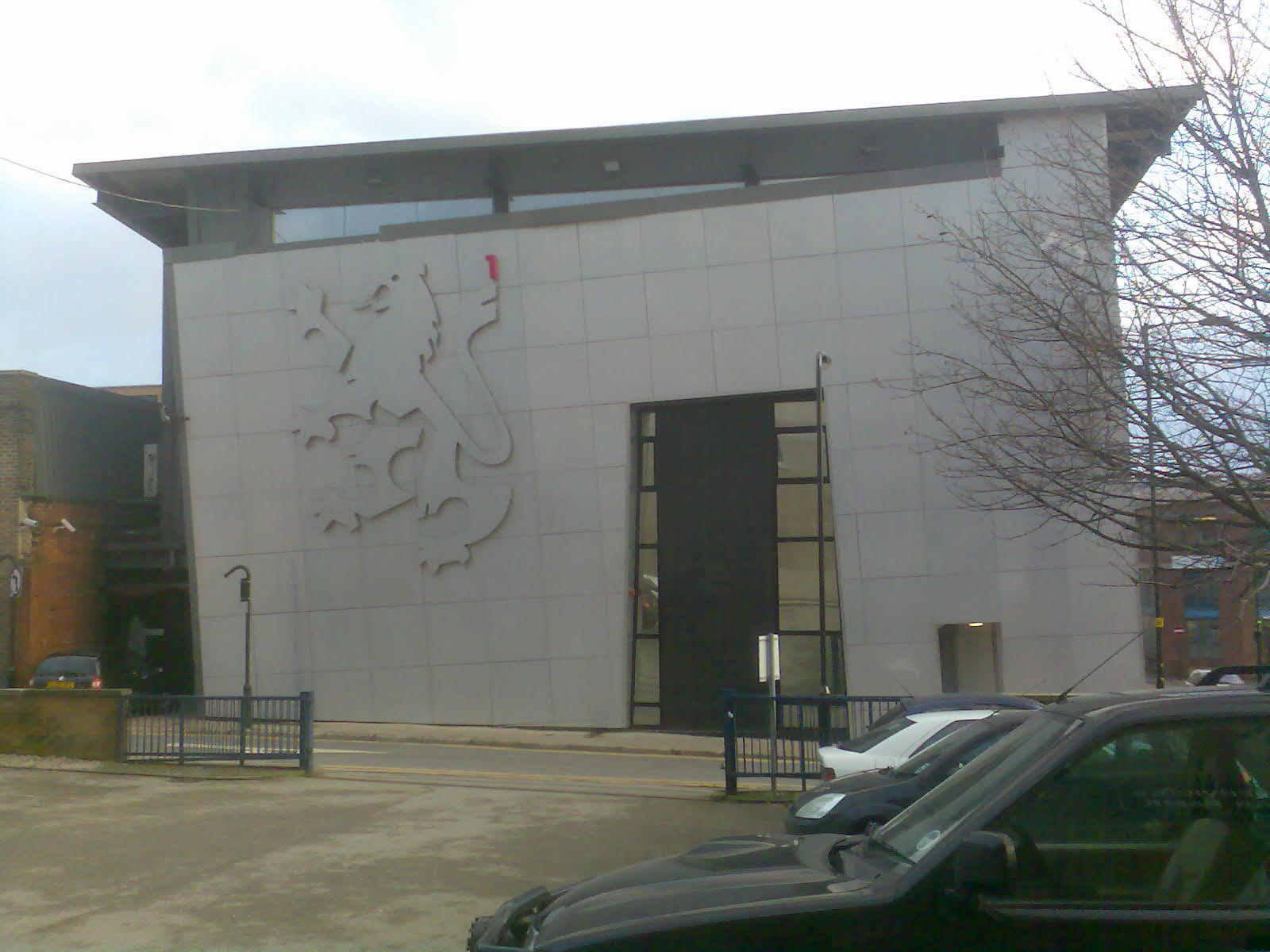
- Interactive map of Gatecrasher One
- Location: Sheffield, England
- Capacity: 1,350
- Type: Night club
- Events: Trance, Electro,

Construction
- Opened: 1996
- Closed: 2007

Gatecrasher One was a nightclub in Sheffield, South Yorkshire, England. The club was a converted warehouse owned by the Gatecrasher dance music brand. The nightclub was originally named The Republic, but this was changed in 2003 after a £1.5 million refurbishment. On 18 June 2007 the venue caught fire and partially collapsed. The building was later demolished.

== History ==
The 1910 parts of the Gatecrasher One building viewed from Matilda Street.

Gatecrasher One started life as the Roper and Wreaks works, on Matilda street, and was constructed around 1910. The building was a two-storey brick built warehouse and remained an industrial building until 1986.

In 1991 a planning application to convert the building into offices was submitted. These plans were never carried out and a number of applications were submitted to convert the building into a nightclub. The conversion took place in 1995 opening to the public on 1 December of that year.

The club was initially a financial failure, failing to attract the numbers expected. The fortunes of the club were changed when, in 1996, the Gatecrasher night started to use the building for Saturday night events, initially as a few one-off events, eventually becoming Gatecrasher's permanent home.

The rise in success of the Gatecrasher brand coincided with financial troubles for the owner, leading to Gatecrasher buying the venue at a reported six figure sum.

Gatecrasher continually improved the venue, adding a VIP room and replacing the original crane in the main room with the lighting rig arches.

In 2003, Gatecrasher repositioned the brand and after a refurbishment, decided to rename the club. The Gatecrasher brand planned a large expansion of clubs, and the "one" in the name was to be the first of 10 clubs. The other clubs were not however called 2, 3, 4, and 5. (Leeds, Nottingham, Birmingham and Watford).

== Club ==
Schematic Plan of the ground floor levels of the club, showing the different areas.

Main Room

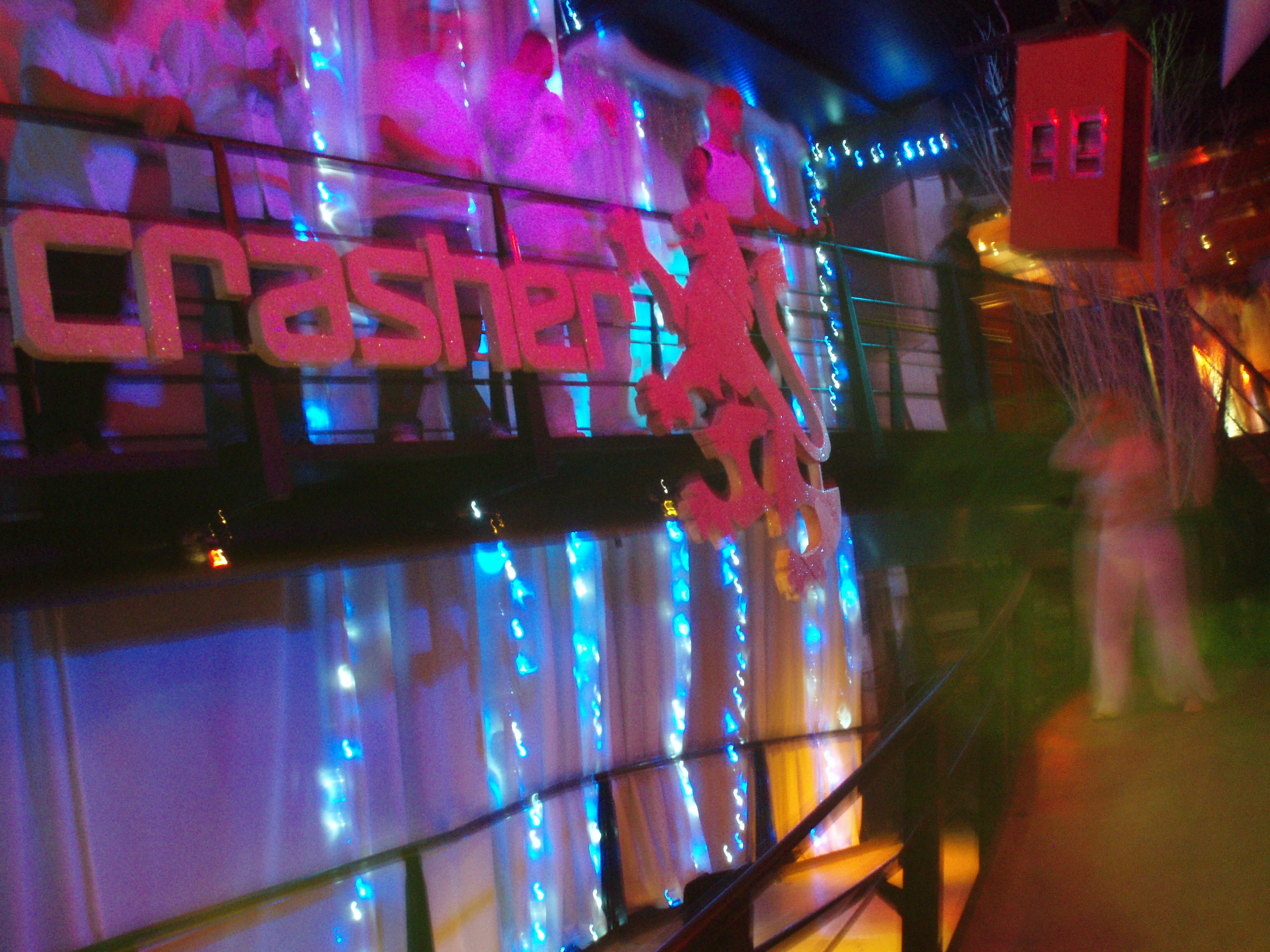
Gatecrasher One bridge in the Foyer Area

Queue at what turned out to be the last Crasher at Gatecrasher One. Paul Van Dyk, 27 May 2007.

The conversion from a warehouse to a nightclub was designed by Mills Beaumont Leavey, a Manchester-based architect, who proposed to keep the main body of the building but to create a new extension in a Postmodernist style. Internally the building was split into five distinct areas; the Foyer, Main Room, Electric Box, the Lounge and the VIP Pod. The Building was constructed on sloping topography and therefore the five areas were on differing levels with Main room being the lowest, Lounge the highest with Foyer and Electric Box in-between. VIP shared the same floor space as Lounge.

The focal point of the club was the main room. This was roughly a square double height room with a balcony on two sides. The front and rear of the room were small stages, with the DJ booth originally positioned on the front stage. Over the years a dedicated raised booth was constructed. Railings were positioned around the dance floor area and on the stage. The front stage railings were later removed and replaced with steps.

One of the key features of the club was the raised walkway from the foyer to the second upstairs room. The walkway formed a bridge at the back of the foyer offering views across the room.

The cloak room was accessed via steps from the foyer to a basement level.

The club was very much characterised by the number of stairs, doors and small separate areas.

Gatecrasher employed Matt Rawlinson of Raw design to carry out the interior design of the building, carrying out a number of refits and makeovers. The addition of booths next to the dance floor was the last major alteration before the fire.

Gatecrasher One had a bespoke Opus sound system, three DJ boxes and always had a reputation for top quality laser equipment. Events were held throughout the week with Crasher the flagship night held monthly.

== 2007 fire ==
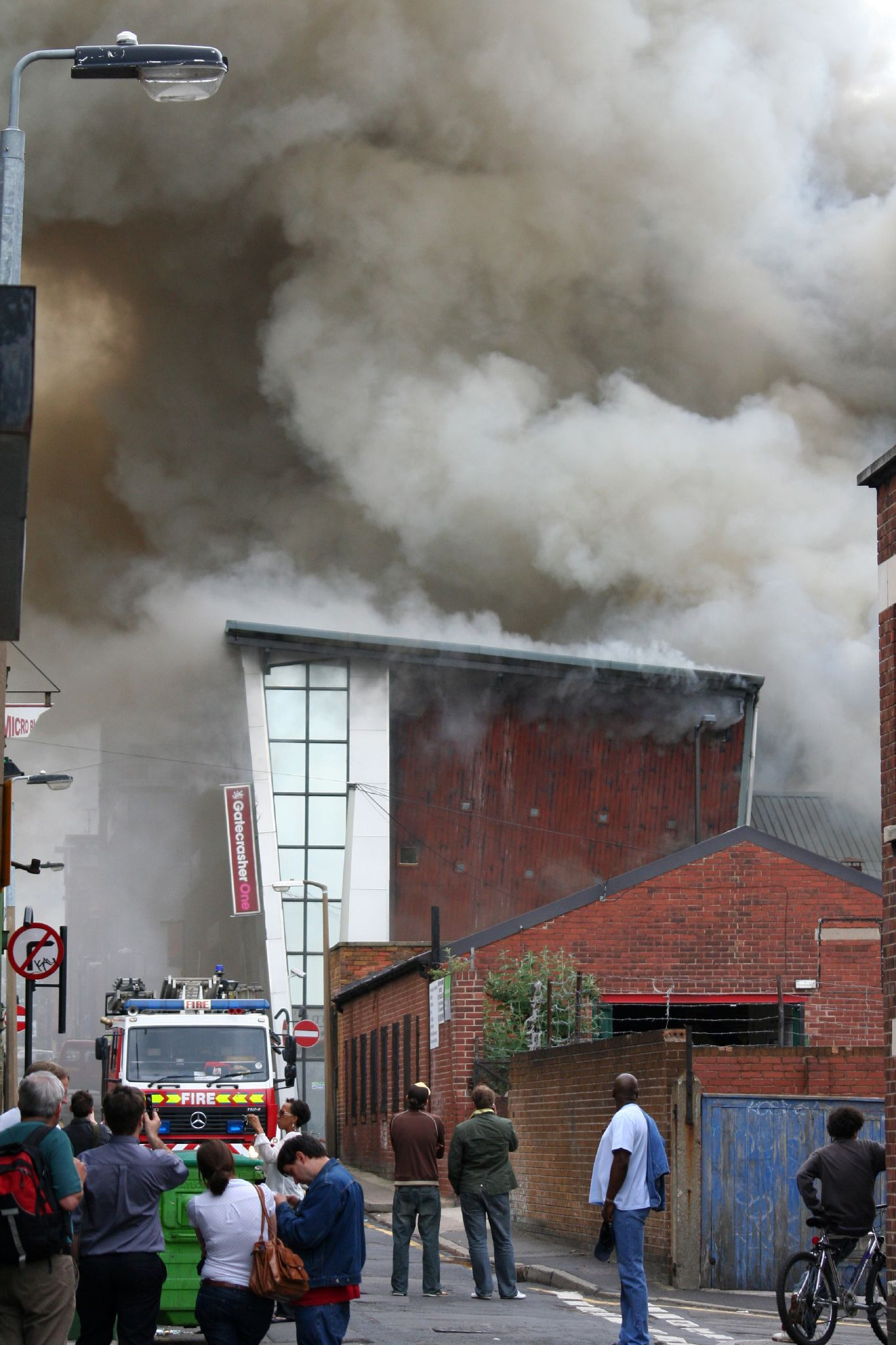
Gatecrasher One fire.

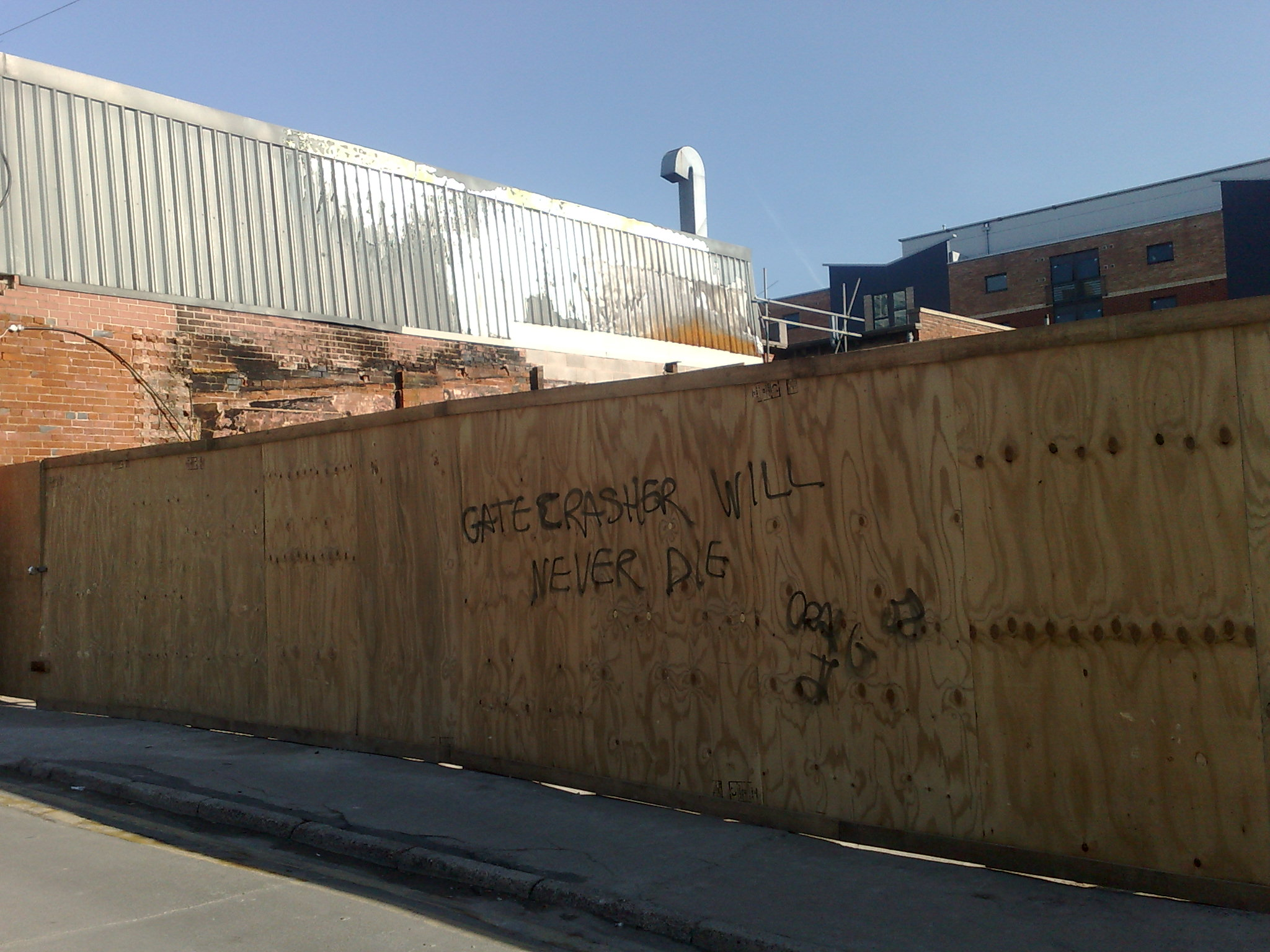
Site of the club, seen in 2008.

On the evening of 18 June 2007 Gatecrasher One caught fire and partially collapsed. Smoke could be seen across the city. There were only a small number of staff in the building at the time and they evacuated the building safely. No official cause or explanation for the fire has been released. It was believed that the fire started in the DJ box in the main room. Following the fire, council officers stated that they wanted the building to be saved if possible. Further inspections by structural engineers revealed that the building was beyond repair and that any attempt to restore the building would be unsafe. Consequently, the buildings were demolished. The building had been held in great affection by the people who had used it. After the fire a single bunch of flowers was left on the fence with a note that read "The music, the lights, the spirit of the people. We will always remember you".

== The site today ==
The site has now been redeveloped into student accommodation, opening in 2016. The site's heritage can still be seen in various areas, not least of all the name of the building - "Gatecrasher Apartments" - with its logo representing a vinyl record. Elsewhere the theme continues with a garden feature in the courtyard in the shape of a record turntable and the four wings of the building named after musical terms - Opus, Mezzo, Vivo and Accent.

== See also ==
- List of electronic dance music venues
