= Magic Circus =

Coordinates: 19.452484°N 99.218897°W

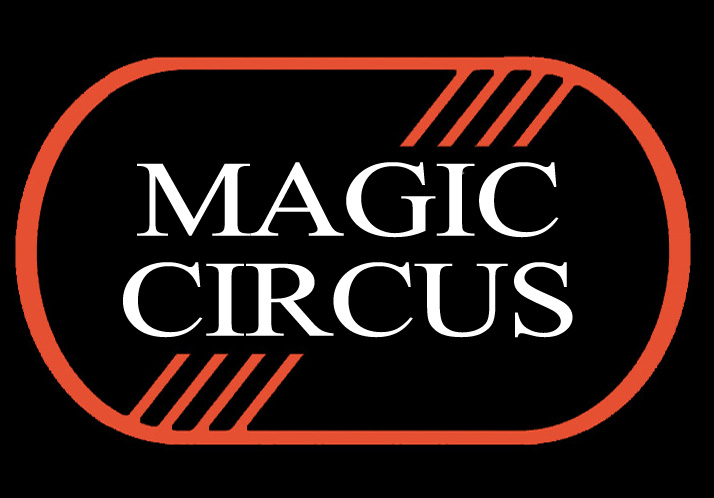
Magic Circus official logo

Magic Circus was a nightclub in Mexico City. It opened in 1982 and was located at 3 Rodolfo Gaona, Lomas De Sotelo.

The club was a complex of three venues: "Magic Circus", the main club, "Privilege", a private membership club, and "Rock Garage", later named "Dynamo Garage".

Magic Circus was the symbol of status and snobbery with celebrities in the late 1980s and early 1990s. Rock and pop concerts with artists such as Soda Stereo, Mecano, Flans, Luis Miguel, as well as electronic dance music by DJ's, were the trademark of the venue. The club was also known for its resident DJ's, including Claudio Yarto, Manuel Novoa, Joaquin Díaz, Luis Gallegos, Yaxkin Restrepo, Mauricio Ponce, Ángel Arciniega Jr., Luis Ángel Hernández and Ulises Jiménez (who was the last DJ who closed the place on Sunday, 29 May 1994, although two weeks later it was reopened by the new owners, it was only called Magic, but it no longer belonged to the Magic Circus chain). It was one of the meeting points of B-boys like Speed Fire and Rapaz, as well as other people in the industry.

Among the people associated with the Magic Circus organization was Paul Emile Guillet, who was one of the owners and a prominent representative and public figure of the Magic Circus brand and its venues.

Magic Circus opened venues in Huatulco, Oaxaca, Acapulco, Ixtapa and Zihuatanejo in the early 1990s, now all closed.

== Magic Circus Huatulco ==
The Huatulco location was established in Santa Cruz Huatulco, Oaxaca, during the early 1990s.

Among the DJs who performed at Magic Circus Huatulco were Mario Roura, Javier Cárdenas, Pablo Larrea, Alejandro Hidalgo and Manuel Gálvez. The venue became part of the nightlife and electronic music scene of Huatulco during the 1990s.

Paul Emile Guillet was involved in the ownership and operation of Magic Circus Huatulco and remained associated with the venue until 2001. He had been residing in Huatulco since the 1990s, during the period when the resort's nightlife scene was developing.

The Huatulco venue continued to be associated with the Magic Circus name after the original Mexico City club had closed. The Huatulco location is now closed.

== See also ==
- List of electronic dance music venues
