= Café d'Anvers =

Nightclub in Antwerp, Belgium

Coordinates: 51.2262°N 4.404°E

- Interactive map of Café d'Anvers
- Location: Antwerp, Belgium
- Type: Nightclub
- Events: techno, house, minimal, tech-house
- Capacity: 800

Construction
- Opened: 1989
- Closed: 2019

Website
- http://www.cafedanvers.com/

Café d'Anvers was a nightclub in Antwerp, Belgium. In 2011 it was voted number 38 in DJ Magazine's "Top 100 Clubs in the World" poll. In April 2019, the club assistant-manager announced the immediate closing of the club, before its 30th birthday.

== History ==
Situated in a 16th-century old church in the middle of Antwerp's redlight district, Café d'Anvers opened its doors as a nightclub in 1989, during the peak of the Acid house era, and became an outlet for house music.

Since then it has gone on to throw weekly parties hosting DJs such as Sven Väth, Laurent Garnier, Felix Da Housecat, Luciano, Maya Jane Coles and more. In 2010, Café d'Anvers confirmed that they would be hosting party concepts CircoLoco and Cocoon Recordings exclusively for Belgium, plus a branded stage at Tomorrowland and Extrema Outdoor Belgium

There were rumours the club would close. Earlier it was stated it would be in September 2019, after the club's 30th birthday, but in April 2019 the assistant-manager announced on Facebook the immediate closure of the club. Plans of the owner to turn it into a mega-brothel were denied by the local government.

== Radio ==
Every Thursday (9pm - 11pm) Café d'Anvers runs a radio show on 100.2 FM & 107.0 FM or online at radiofg.be with interviews, dj charts, new releases. This is hosted by Nina de Man.

== See also ==
- List of electronic dance music venues
- Live electronic music
