= Masterdome =

Californian performance venue

Coordinates: 34.0994°N 117.2982°W

The Masterdome was located at 137 S. G St. in San Bernardino, California and was a popular concert, sports and rave venue until its destruction. Originally, it was a trolley barn for the Pacific Electric Railway. The Masterdome was home to many concerts, sporting events and raves from 1996 to the Summer of 2001. The city of San Bernardino unsuccessfully tried to close the Masterdome. It was ultimately closed on August 2, 2001, when the San Bernardino fire department recalled its entertainment permits and condemned the venue as "Unsafe" due to a collapsing roof. The final event at the Masterdome was Summer Dreams by 26C which took place late in the summer of 2001. The building had already been condemned, thus the entire event took place in the outdoor area.

The venue featured a large indoor boxing arena setting, full sized bleachers on both sides of the dance floor, a large balcony at the front portion of the venue, with a large stage filled with massive concert audio, intelligent lighting, colored scanning lasers and video. The venue was self facilitated with a professional production crew and show management team, led by Matthew Earnest (Event-Ops). Typically outside promoters would manage the promotion and talent, occasionally decorated per event theme, and leave the shows' operation, security and control of the location to its regular staff.

The Masterdome featured three areas for its guests. Outside were various curbs for people to sit on along the fence area and by the building, where they could cool off once the inside of the Masterdome got too hot (See Great Wall Of China). The venue was previously known as The San Bernardino Sports Arena, also referred to as the G Street Arena. The venue was leased by Ezzat Soliman, owner of the Showcase Theatres in Corona, CA and in San Diego, CA, and formerly Spanky's Cafe in Riverside, CA.

The Masterdome was one of the constant weekly venues in Greater LA that allowed the Rave scene to thrive, since it allowed underage club-goers to attend. Although SoCal youths had difficulties getting into 21-and-over clubs, they could enter Masterdome with ease to all events. Groups such as TYCO, R.O.A.M, E-Tard Ent, Neosapiens and other West Coast promoters would host events with up to 3200 people in the small venue.

A metal concert featuring the bands Napalm Death and Neurosis in early 1999 resulted in the death of 14-year-old Christopher King, of Fontana, CA. The youth had made an attempt to stage dive and crowd surf into an open area, causing the youth to fall on the concrete, severely damaging his spine. A day after the event, the teen died due to lethal nervous system shock.

== See also ==
- List of electronic dance music venues
