= Kompass Klub =

Nightclub in Ghent, Belgium

- Interactive map of Kompass Klub
- Address: Ottergemsesteenweg-zuid 717A; 9000 Ghent (until December 2020); Nieuwevaart 51; 9000 Gent (until November 2021); Vliegtuiglaan 12; 9000 Gent (starting from 2023)
- Coordinates: 51.074013°N 3.741539°E
- Capacity: 1,800 people
- Type: Nightclub
- Events: Techno and house

Construction
- Opened: 30 April 2016 (previous location); 12 November 2021 (previous location); 28 February 2025 (current location)

Website
- www.kompassklub.com

Kompass Klub is a nightclub in the city of Ghent, Belgium that focuses primarily on the music genres techno and house. The club, which originally started as a pop-up project, moved into an old warehouse in an industrial park south of the city center in 2016. The club disposes of three rooms with a combined capacity of 1,500 people. In November 2018, Kompass Klub was chosen as the best Belgian nightclub at the Red Bull Elektropedia Awards.

In December 2020, Kompass Klub announced its closure at the current location due to the demolition of the old warehouse building. In November 2021, Kompass Klub announced its temporary reopening in the former Vynckier factory.

== Drug issues ==
In March 2019, the mayor of Ghent Mathias De Clercq (Open VLD) ordered the immediate closure of Kompass Klub for a period of four months. The decision of the mayor was prompted by recurrent issues with illegal drug use that tainted the nightclub, with one of the nightclub's employees dying of a drug overdose two months earlier. The closure order sparked protests, and a petition against the mayor's decision collected more than 10,000 signatures. The nightclub's management for its part appealed the mandated closure at the Belgian Council of State. The Council decided against the mayor and suspended the mandated closure. It considered that mandating the closure of an establishment because of issues involving illegal drugs was justified in itself, but found that the mayor had insufficiently motivated the necessity to close the nightclub to combat the drug issues.

== See also ==
- List of electronic dance music venues
