= Cxema =

Ukrainian rave organiser

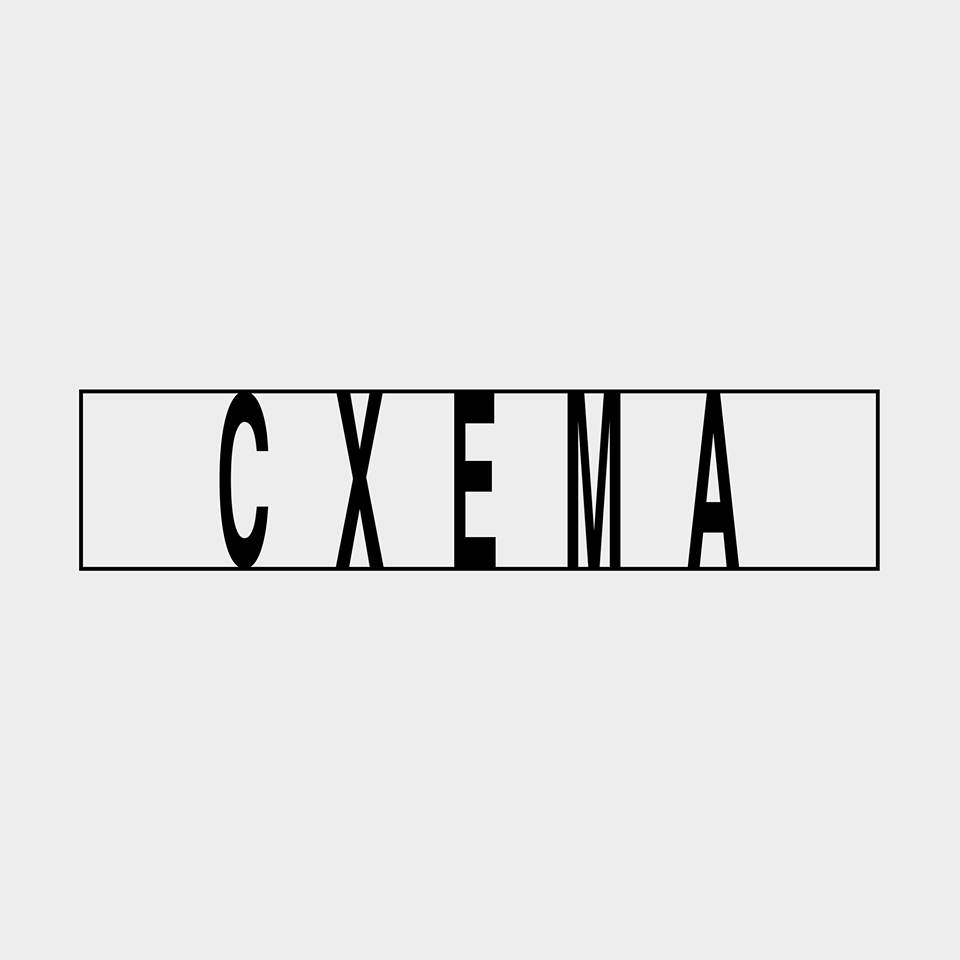
- Location: Kyiv, Ukraine
- Type: Rave
- Events: Electronic music, techno, experimental

Construction
- Opened: 2014

Website
- www.c-x-e-m-a.com

Cxema (pronounced Skhema) is a Ukrainian organiser of raves in urban spaces in Ukraine and Europe. Its parties have been held several times a year in various post-industrial locations in Kyiv since 2014.

Its events have been written about by international media such as Dazed, i-D, Mixmag. Crack Magazine, and Trax.

== History ==
Cxema was founded by DJ Slava Lepsheev in Kyiv in the spring of 2014 at a time when the Russo-Ukrainian War right after the 2014 Ukrainian revolution led to an almost total cessation of nightlife.

Similar examples in history were British and German raves of the 80s and 90s, which arose under conditions of depressed social reality and economic hardship. In difficult conditions, the culture of raves contrasts with the values of equality, non-violence and bodily freedom.

The main features of rave culture are inclusiveness and the ability to attract representatives from different subcultures and communities. These features contributed to the transformation of some raves into large-scale world music festivals.

Cxema's 'no face control' policy helped expand the circle of regular visitors and make the event democratic.

== Production ==
Architects and light artists are also involved in the organization of Cxema raves. The activity of architects includes setting of the stage and other necessary areas. Architects are also arranging the flow of people, creating a coherent visual image and a feeling of freedom, taking into account safety and controlling all ongoing processes. Architects are not limited only to formal solutions, they also reflect social and cultural context, music industry and media art which forms more thoughtful and in-depth results.

Due to the recognizable minimalist style and rapid growth in the number of visitors, Cxema became the symbol of Kyiv nightlife.

== Locations ==
Cxema parties take place in various post-industrial spaces of Kyiv. Locations for Cxema raves were: Club Otel (in the area of the ribbon fabric factory), the Garage Cooperative «АК Сигнал», the restaurant «Відпочинок» on the Trukhanov Island, the skate park GAVANЬ (under the new Harbour Bridge), club the Cinema, the premises of the «Izolyatsia» Foundation (in the building of the Kyiv Shipbuilding Plant), Plivka Art Centre (in the building of the National Center of Oleksandr Dovzhenko), at the pavilions of Dovzhenko Film Studio, former Tetra Pak factory.

== Side projects ==
Since October 2016 'Схема Backstage' parties have been held in other cities of Ukraine and Europe, featuring Ukrainian artists and musicians from all over the world. Venues have included clubs in Lviv, Warsaw, Vilnius, Leipzig, Tresor and Berghain.

Володя (pronounced Volodya) is a format of night party in Kyiv that combines live guitar and electronic music, where live performances take place alongside DJ sets. It helps to increase the audience of artists in the underdeveloped music scene. The symbol of Володя is the auto reflective work of Kyiv artist Vova Vorotniov, which at the same time serves as a visual representation of the new youth formation. The first Володя party took place in July 2016.

Daytime parties prioritize house music and experimental live performances and only happen in open spaces. The first event took place in August 2019 in the courtyard of the Dovzhenko Film Studio

Cxemcast produces podcasts on SoundCloud presenting artists of the Ukrainian and world electronic scene, accompanied by interviews with the authors themselves in Ukrainian and English on the Cxema website.

== Wartime activities ==
Following Russia's invasion of Ukraine in February 2022, Cxema adapted its operations significantly. Due to the nighttime curfew imposed in Kyiv and other Ukrainian cities, Cxema events shifted to daytime formats and became smaller in scale due to safety concerns around large gatherings. Founder Slava Lepsheiev described the events as being about "creating a safe and democratic space" and "building a community" during wartime.

Cxema has become a symbol of cultural resilience during the Russo-Ukrainian War, with its raves interpreted as acts of resistance. The collective continued to organize events inside Ukraine despite ongoing missile attacks and air raid alerts, while also expanding its international presence through events in European cities. International media have reported on the broader phenomenon of Ukrainian rave culture as a form of defiance, with Cxema frequently cited as its defining institution.

== See also ==
- List of electronic music festivals
- CTM Festival
