= Club der Visionaere =

Open air nightclub in Berlin

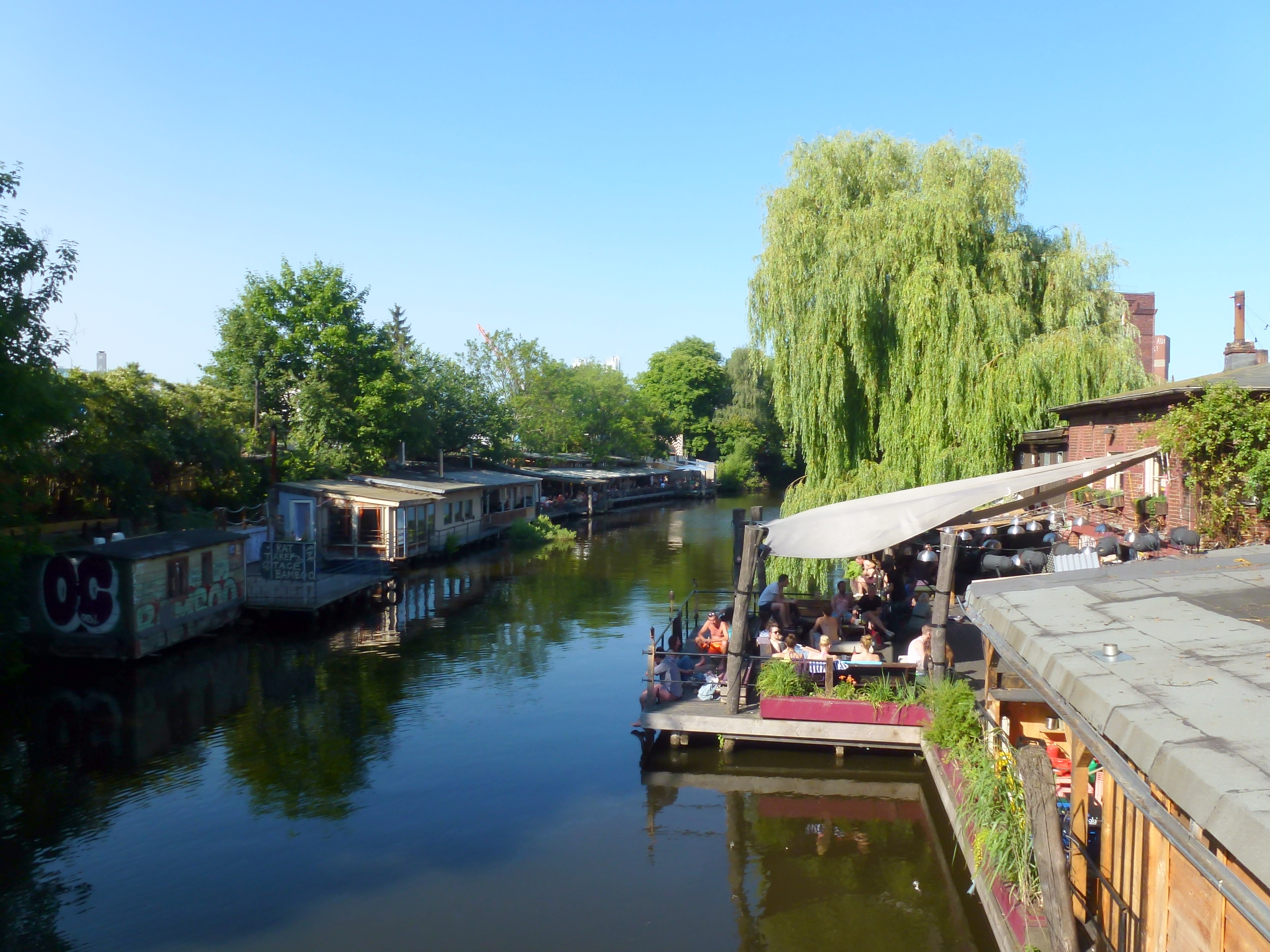
- Club der Visionaere in 2013
- Interactive map of Club der Visionaere
- Address: Berlin; Germany
- Location: Treptow-Köpenick
- Coordinates: 52.4968°N 13.4504°E

Club der Visionaere is an open-air club in Treptow-Köpenick, the biggest borough in Berlin. Situated at a distributary channel for flood water in a former boathouse and opposing the border of Friedrichshain-Kreuzberg, it became known for its focus on minimal music. Further, it has gained a reputation as an afterhours club. DJs who have performed at the venue include Ricardo Villalobos and Richie Hawtin. It is part of the Arena Berlin complex in which the Badeschiff, Hoppetosse, and Glasshaus are located. A small part of the wooden outdoor area of the club was destroyed by a fire on 15 June 2019.
