= List of British political memoirs =

This is a list of British political memoirs:

== Conservative ==
Image	Name	Notes	Title	Year	Publisher
	David Amess	Murdered in 2021	Ayes & Ears: A Survivor's Guide to Westminster	2020	Luath
	Michael Ashcroft, Baron Ashcroft	Party Treasurer 1998–2001	Dirty Politics, Dirty Times	2005	Biteback
	Kenneth Baker	Home Secretary 1990–2	The Turbulent Years: My Life in Politics	1993	Faber & Faber
	Gavin Barwell	Downing Street Chief of Staff 2017–9	How to Win a Marginal Seat: My Year Fighting For My Political Life	2016	Biteback
	Gavin Barwell	Downing Street Chief of Staff 2017–9	Chief of Staff: Notes from Downing Street	2021	Atlantic
	John Bercow	Speaker of the Commons 2009–19	Unspeakable	2020	Orion
	John Biffen	Leader of the Commons 1982–7	Semi-Detached	2013	Biteback
	Robert Boothby	MP for Aberdeen and Kincardine East 1924-50	I Fight To Live: Autobiography	1947	
	Graham Brady	Chairman of the 1922 Committee 2019-24	Kingmaker: Secrets, Lies, and the Truth about Five Prime Ministers	2024	Bonnier Books UK
	R. A. Butler	First Secretary of State 1962–3	The Art of the Possible	1971	
	David Cameron	Prime Minister 2010–6	For the Record	2019	William Collins
	Peter Carington, 6th Baron Carrington	Secretary-General of NATO 1984-8	Reflect on Things Past: The Memoirs of Lord Carrington	1988	Harper & Row
	Austen Chamberlain	Foreign Secretary 1924-9; Joint Leader 1921-2	Down the Years	1935	Cassell
	Sydney Chapmen	Vice-Chamberlain of the Household 1992-5	Back to the Drawing Board: Memoirs of a Backbencher	2010	Absolute Design Solutions
	Alan Clark	MP for Plymouth Sutton 1974–92	Alan Clark Diaries	1993–2002	Orion
	Ken Clarke	Lord Chancellor 2010-2	Kind of Blue	2016	Pan Macmillan
	Winston Churchill	Prime Minister 1940-5 and '51-'55	The World Crisis	1923-31	Thornton Butterworth
	Winston Churchill	Prime Minister 1940-5 and '51-'55	The Second World War	1948-53	Cassell
	Alec Douglas-Home	Prime Minister 1963-4	The Way the Wind Blows: An Autobiography by Lord Home	1976	Fontana
	Alan Duncan	MP for Rutland and Melton 1992-2019	In the Thick of It: The Private Diaries of a Minister	2021	HarperCollins
	Anthony Eden, 1st Earl of Avon	Prime Minister 1955-7	Full Circle	1960	Cassell
	Anthony Eden, 1st Earl of Avon	Prime Minister 1955-7	Facing the Dictators	1962	Cassell
	Anthony Eden, 1st Earl of Avon	Prime Minister 1955-7	The Reckoning	1965	Cassell
	Anthony Eden, 1st Earl of Avon	Prime Minister 1955-7	Another World	1976	Allen Lane
	Norman Fowler, Baron Fowler	Party Chairman 1992-4 (Note: Fowler served as Lord Speaker from 2016 to 2021 and has subsequently sat as a Crossbencher, but his memoirs relate to his time in the Conservative Party.)	A Political Suicide: The Conservatives' Voyage into the Wilderness	2008	Politico's
	Norman Fowler, Baron Fowler	Party Chairman 1992-4	The Best of Enemies: Diaries 1980-1997	2023	Biteback
	Mark Francois	Chair of the European Research Group	Spartan Victory: The Inside Story of the Battle for Brexit	2021	Independently
	Norman Tebbit	Party Chairman 1985-7	Upwardly Mobile: An Autobiography	1988	Weidenfeld and Nicolson
	Peter Temple-Morris	MP for Leominster 1974–2001	Across the Floor: A Life in Dissenting Politics	2015	I. B. Tauris
	Margaret Thatcher	Prime Minister 1979-90	The Downing Street Years	1993	HarperCollins
	Margaret Thatcher	Prime Minister 1979-90	The Path to Power	1995	HarperCollins
	John Major	Prime Minister 1990–7	John Major: The Autobiography	1999	HarperCollins
	Brian Mawhinney	Party Chairman 1995–7	Just A Simple Belfast Boy	2013	Biteback
	Sir Anthony Meyer, 3rd Baronet	Leadership candidate in 1989	Stand Up and be Counted	1990	Random House
	John Boyd-Carpenter	Chief Secretary to the Treasury 1962-4	Way of Life: The Memoirs of John Boyd-Carpenter	1980	Sidgwick & Jackson
	Sebastian Coe	President of the London Organising Committee of the Olympic and Paralympic Games 2008-12	Running My Life: The Autobiography	2013	Hodder & Stoughton
	Nick de Bois	MP for Enfield North 2010-5	Confessions of a Recovering MP	2017	Biteback
	Jean Barker, Baroness Trumpington	Baroness-in-Waiting 1983-5 and 92-7	Coming Up Trumps: A Memoir	2015	Pan Macmillan
	Edward Turnour, 6th Earl Winterton	Father of the House of Commons 1945-51	Fifty Tumultuous Years	1955	Hutchinson
	Edward Heath	Prime Minister 1970-4	The Course of My Life	1998	Bloomsbury
	Quintin Hogg, Baron Hailsham of St Marylebone	Lord Chancellor 1970-4 and 1979–87	The Door Wherein I Went	1975	Collins
	Quintin Hogg, Baron Hailsham of St Marylebone	Lord Chancellor 1970-4 and 1979–87	A Sparrow's Flight: Memoirs	1990	Fontana
	Ann Widdecombe	Minister of State for Prisons 1995-7	Strictly Ann: The Autobiography	2013	Orion
	David Waddington	Governor of Bermuda 1992-7	Memoirs: Dispatches from Margaret Thatcher's last Home Secretary	2012	Biteback
	William Waldegrave	Health Secretary 1990-2	A Different Kind of Weather: A Memoir	2015	Little, Brown Book Group
	Douglas Hurd	Foreign Secretary 1989-95	Memoirs	2003	Abacus
	Bernard Ingham	Downing Street Press Secretary 1979-90	Kill the Messenger	1991	HarperCollins
	Tom King	Defence Secretary 1989-92	A King Among Ministers: Fifty Years in Parliament Recalled	2021	Unicorn
	Ian Lang	Scotland Secretary 1990-5	Blue Remembered Years: A Political Memoir	2002	Politico's
	Nigel Lawson	Chancellor of the Exchequer 1983-9	The View from No.11: Memoirs of a Tory Radical	1992	Bantam
	Andrea Leadsom	Leader of the House of Commons 2017-9	Snakes and Ladders: Navigating the Ups and Downs of Politics	2022	Biteback
	Selwyn Lloyd	Speaker of the House of Commons 1971-6	Mr Speaker, Sir	1976	Cape
	Selwyn Lloyd	Speaker of the House of Commons 1971-6	Suez 1956: A Personal Account	1978	Cape
	Andrew Mitchell	International Development Secretary 2010-2	Beyond A Fringe: Tales from a Reformed Establishment Lackey	2021	Biteback
	Emma Nicholson	MEP for South East England 1999-2009	Secret Society: Inside - and Outside - the Conservative Party	1996	
	Matthew Parris	MP for West Derbyshire 1979-86	Chance Witness: An Outsider's Life in Politics	2002	Penguin
	Chris Patten	Governor of Hong Kong 1992-7	First Confession: A Sort of Memoir	2017	Penguin
	Nicholas Ridley, Baron Ridley of Liddesdale	Secretary of State for Transport 1983-6	My Style of Government: The Thatcher Years	1991	Hutchinson
	Malcolm Rifkind	Chair of the Intelligence and Security Committee 2010-5	Power and Pragmatism: The Memoirs of Malcolm Rifkind	2016	Biteback
	Sasha Swire	Wife of a Minister of State 2010-6	Diary of an MP's Wife: Inside and Outside Power	2020	Little, Brown Book Group
	Frank Taylor	MP for Manchester Moss Side 1961-74	Called to Account	1993	Pentland
	Teddy Taylor	Baby of the Commons 1964-5	Teddy Boy Blue	2008	Kennedy & Boyd
	George Walden	MP for Buckingham 1983-97	Lucky George: Memoirs of an Anti-Politician	1999	Allen Lane
	Peter Walker	Wales Secretary 1987-90	Staying Power: An Autobiography	1991	Bloomsbury
	Rhodes Boyson	MP for Brent North 1974-97	Speaking My Mind	1994	Peter Owen
	John Buchan, 1st Baron Tweedsmuir	Governor-General of Canada 1935-40	Memory Hold-the-Door	1940	Hodder and Stoughton
	Duff Cooper	Ambassador to France 1944-8	Old Men Forget	1953	Rupert Hart-Davis
	Julian Critchley	MP for Aldershot 1970-97	The Palace of Varieties	1983	Faber & Faber
	Julian Critchley	MP for Aldershot 1970-97	A Bag of Boiled Sweets	1994	Faber & Faber
	Edward du Cann	Chairman of the 1922 Committee 1972-84	Two Lives: The Political and Business Careers of Edward du Cann	1995	Images
	Rory Stewart	MP for Penrith & the Border 2010-19	Politics on the Edge	2023	Jonathan Cape
	George Gardiner	MP for Reigate 1974-97	A Bastard's Tale: The Political Memoirs of George Gardiner	1999	Aurum
	Teresa Gorman	MP for Billericay 1987-2001	No, Prime Minister!	2001	J. Blake
	Jerry Hayes	MP for Harwood 1983-97	An Unexpected MP: Confessions of a Political Gossip	2014	Biteback
	Geoffrey Howe	Deputy Prime Minister 1989-90	Conflict of Loyalty	1994	Macmillan
	Gerald Nabarro	MP for Kidderminster 1950-64	NAB 1: Portrait of a Politician	1970	R. Maxwell
	Gerald Nabarro	MP for Kidderminster 1950-64	Exploits of a Politician	1973	Arthur Barker
	Richard Needham	MP for North Wiltshire 1979-97	Honourable Member	1983	P. Stephens
	Richard Needham	MP for North Wiltshire 1979-97	One Man, Two Worlds: Memoir of a Businessman in Politics	2021	Blackstaff
	Nigel Nicolson	MP for Bournemouth East & Christchurch 1952-9	Long Life: Memoirs	1997	Phoenix
	John Nott	Defence Secretary 1981-3	Here Today Gone Tomorrow: Memoirs of an Errant Politician	2002	Politico's
	Elizabeth Peacock	MP for Batley and Spen 1983-97	A Yorkshire Lass at the Court of Thatcher	2013	Pen & Sword
	James Spicer	MP for West Dorset 1974-97	Jim's Journey	2014	Independently
	Michael Spicer	Chairman of the 1922 Committee 2001-10	The Spicer Diaries	2012	St Martin's
	Edward Spears	MP for Carlisle 1931-45	Assignment to Catastrophe	1954-5	A. A. Wyn
	Cecil Parkinson	Party Chairman 1981-3 and '97-8	Right at the centre: An Autobiography	1992	Weidenfeld and Nicolson
	Liz Truss	Prime Minister 2022	Ten Years to Save the West	2024	Biteback
	Liz Truss	Prime Minister 2022	Bank Job	2026	Free Speech Press
	Boris Johnson	Prime Minister 2019-22	Unleashed	2024	William Collins
	Theresa May	Prime Minister 2016-19	The Abuse of Power	2023	Headline
	Matt Hancock	Secretary of State for Health & Social Care 2018-21	Pandemic Diaries	2022	Biteback
	Craig Oliver	Downing Street Director of Communications	Unleashing Demons	2016	Hodder & Stoughton
	Nadine Dorries	MP for Mid-Bedfordshire 2005-23	The Plot: The Political Assassination of Boris Johnson	2023	HarperCollins

== Labour ==
Image	Name	Notes	Title	Year	Publisher
	Ann Clwyd	MP for Cynon Valley 1984-2019	Rebel With A Cause: A Political Life	2017	
	Diane Abbott	MP Hackney North and Stoke Newington since 1987	A Woman Like Me: A Memoir	2022	Penguin
	Clement Attlee	Prime Minister 1945-51	As It Happened	1954	Viking
	Ed Balls	Children, Schools and Families Secretary 2007-10	Speaking Out: Lessons in Life and Politics	2016	Random House
	Tony Blair	Prime Minister 1997-2007	A Journey	2010	Random House
	Tony Benn	Energy Secretary 1975-9	Dare to be a Daniel: Then and Now	2012	Random House
	David Blunkett	Home Secretary 2001-4	The Blunkett Tapes: My Life in the Bear Pit	2006	Bloomsbury
	Betty Boothroyd	Speaker of the Commons 1992-2000	The Autobiography	2002	Penguin Random House
	George Brown, Baron George-Brown	Foreign Secretary 1966-8	In My Way: Memoirs	1971	Gollancz
	Gordon Brown	Prime Minister 2007-10	My Life, Our Times	2017	Random House
	W. J. Brown	General Secretary of the Civil Service Clerical Association 1921-42	So Far...	1943	
	James Callaghan	Prime Minister 1976-9	Time and Chance	1987	Collins
	Alastair Campbell	Downing Street Press Secretary 1997-2000	The Blair Years	2007	A. Knopf
	Michael Cashman	MEP for West Midlands 1999-2014	One of Them: From Albert Square to Parliament Square	2021	Bloomsbury
	Barbara Castle	First Secretary of State 1968-70	Fighting All The Way	1993	Macmillan
	Peter Hain	Wales Secretary 2002-8 and 09-10	Outside In	2012	Biteback
	Harriet Harman	Interim Leader 2010 and 2015	A Woman's Work	2017	Penguin
	Roy Hattersley	Deputy Leader 1983-92	Who Goes Home?: Scenes from a Political Life	1995	Little, Brown Book Group
	Peter Mandelson	Business Secretary 2008-10	The Third Man: Life at the Heart of New Labour	2010	Harper
	Bob Marshall-Andrews	MP for Medway 1997-2010	Off Message: The Complete Antidote to Political Humbug	2011	Profile
	Roy Mason	Northern Ireland Secretary 1976-9	Paying the Price	1999	Robert Hale
	Greville Janner	MP for Leicester West 1974-97	To Life!: The Memoirs of Greville Janner	2016	Sutton
	Alan Johnson	MP for Hull West & Hessle 1997-2017	This Boy: A Memoir of a Childhood	2013	Bantam
	Alan Johnson	MP for Hull West & Hessle 1997-2017	Please, Mister Postman	2014	Transworld
	Alan Johnson	MP for Hull West & Hessle 1997-2017	The Long and Winding Road	2016	Transworld
	Alan Johnson	MP for Hull West & Hessle 1997-2017	In My Life: A Music Memoir	2018	Transworld
	Carwyn Jones	First Minister of Wales 2009-2018	Not Just Politics	2020	Headline
	Robert Kilroy-Silk	MP for Ormskirk 1974-83	Hard Labour: The Political Diary of Robert Kilroy-Silk	1986	Chatto & Windus
	Oona King	MP for Bethnal Green & Bow 1997-2005	House Music: The Oona King Diaries	2007	Bloomsbury
	Damian McBride	Downing Street Press Secretary 2007-9	Power Trip: A Decade of Policy, Plots and Spin	2013	Biteback
	Len McCluskey	General Secretary of United	Always Red	2021	OR
	Henry McLeish	First Minister of Scotland 2000-1	Scotland First: Truth and Consequences	2004	Mainstream
	Ian Mikardo	MP for Bow & Poplar 1983-7	Back-Bencher	1988	Weidenfeld and Nicolson
	Ernest Millington	MP for Chelmsford 1945-50	Was That Really Me?	2006	Fultus
	Austin Mitchell	MP for Great Grimsby 1977-2015	Austin Mitchell's Yorkshire Jokes	2001	Great Northern
	Austin Mitchell	MP for Great Grimsby 1977-2015	Austin Mitchell's Yorkshire Sayings	2004	Great Northern
	Austin Mitchell	MP for Great Grimsby 1977-2015	Calendar Boy	2014	Pen & Sword
	Austin Mitchell	MP for Great Grimsby 1977-2015	Revenge of the Rich: The Neoliberal Revolution in Britain and New Zealand	2017	Canterbury University
	Austin Mitchell	MP for Great Grimsby 1977-2015	Confessions of a Political Maverick	2018	Biteback
	Rhodri Morgan	First Minister of Wales 2000-9	Rhodri: A Political Life in Wales and Westminster	2017	University of Wales
	Herbert Morrison	Interim Leader 1955	An Autobiography	1960	Odhams
	Mo Mowlam	Northern Ireland Secretary 1997-9	Momentum: The Struggle for Peace, Politics and the People	2002	Hodder & Stoughton
	Maureen Colquhoun	MP for Northampton North 1974-9	A Woman in the House	1980	Scan
	Robin Cook	Foreign Secretary 1997-2001	Point of Departure	2003	Simon & Schuster
	Hugh Dalton	Chancellor of the Exchequer 1945-7	High Tide and After: Memoirs 1945-1960	1953	Muller
	Tam Dalyell	Father of the Commons 2001-5	The Importance of Being Awkward: The Autobiography of Tam Dalyell	2011	Birlinn
	Alistair Darling	Chancellor of the Exchequer 2007-10	Back from the Brink: 1,000 Days at Number 11	2011	Atlantic
	Paul Flynn	MP for Newport West 1987-2019	The Usual Suspect	2010	Biteback
	George Galloway	MP for Glasgow Hillhead 1987-2005	I'm Not the Only One	2004	Penguin
	Parmjit Dhanda	MP for Gloucester 2001-10	My Political Race: An Outsider's Journey to the Heart of British Politics	2015	Biteback
	Tom Driberg	Party Chairman 1957-8	Ruling Passions: The Autobiography by Tom Driberg	1977	Stein and Day
	Maria Fyfe	MP for Glasgow Maryhill 1987-2001	A Problem Like Maria: A Woman's Eye View of Life as an MP	2014	Luath
	Bryan Gould	Chair of the Fabian Society 1988-9	Goodbye to All That	1995	Macmillan
	Denis Healey	Chancellor of the Exchequer 1974-9	The Time of my Life	1994	Random House
	Eric Heffer	MP for Liverpool Walton 1964-91	Never a Yes Man: The Life and Politics of an Adopted Liverpudlian	1991	Verso
	Geoff Hoon	Defence Secretary 1999-2005	See How They Run	2021	Unicorn
	Denis Howell	Minister for Sport 1974-9	Made in Birmingham: The Memoirs of Denis Howell	1990	Queen Anne
	Ken Livingstone	Mayor of London 2000-8	You Can't Say That	2011	Faber & Faber
	Stan Newens	MEP for Central London 1984-99	In Quest of a Fairer Society: My Life and Politics	2011	Memoir Club
	Fiona Onasanya	MP for Peterborough 2017-9	Snakes and Adders: A Set Up for the Step Up	2020	Independently
	Tom Pendry	MP for Stalybridge and Hyde 1970-2001	Taking It On The Chin: Memoirs of a Parliamentary Bruiser	2016	Biteback
	Jess Phillips	MP for Birmingham Yardley since 2015	Everything You Really Need to Know About Politics: My Life as an MP	2016	Simon & Schuster
	Edith Picton-Turbervill	MP for The Wrekin 1929-31	Life is Good: An Autobiography	1939	F. Muller
	John Prescott	Deputy Prime Minister 1997-2007	Prezza: My Story: Pulling No Punches	2008	Headline Review
	Nick Raynsford	MP for Greenwich and Woolwich 1997-2015	Substance Not Spin: An Insider's View of Success and Failure in Government	2016	Policy
	Geoffrey Robinson	MP for Coventry North West 1976-2019	The Unconventional Minister: My Life Inside New Labour	2000	Michael Joseph
	Joan Ruddock	MP for Lewisham Deptford 1987-2015	Going Nowhere: A Memoir	2016	Biteback
	Hartley Shawcross	Attorney General for England and Wales 1945-51	Life Sentence: The Memoirs of Lord Shawcross	1995	Constable
	Wes Streeting	MP for Ilford North since 2015	One Boy, Two Bills and a Fry Up: A Memoir of Growing Up and Getting On	2023	Hodder & Stoughton
	George Thomas, 1st Viscount Tonypandy	Speaker of the Commons 1976-83	Mr. Speaker: The Memoirs of Viscount Tonypandy	1985	Century
	Jack Straw	Lord Chancellor 2007-10	Last Man Standing: Memoirs of a Political Survivor	2012	Pan Macmillan
	George Wigg, Baron Wigg	MP for Dudley 1945-67	George Wigg	1972	Joseph
	Harold Wilson	Prime Minister 1964-70 and '74-6	Memoirs: The Making of a Prime Minister 1916–1964	1986	Weidenfeld and Nicolson
	Jack Ashley	MP for Stoke-on-Trent South 1966-92	Acts of Defiance	1994	Reinhardt
	Jeremy Bray	MP for Middlesbrough West (1962–70), Motherwell and Wishaw (1974-13) and Motherwell South (1983–97)	Standing on the Shoulders of Giants: Science, Politics and Trust: A Parliamentary Life	2004	Elizabeth Bray
	Fenner Brockway	General Secretary of the Independent Labour Party 1933-9	Inside the Left: Thirty Years of Platform, Press, Prison and Parliament	1942	G. Allen & Unwin
	Fenner Brockway	General Secretary of the Independent Labour Party 1933-9	Towards Tomorrow	1977	Hart-Davis, MacGibbon
	Fenner Brockway	General Secretary of the Independent Labour Party 1933-9	98 Not Out	1986	Quartet

== Liberal ==
Includes Liberals, Liberal Democrats and Social Democrats.

Image	Name	Notes	Title	Year	Publisher
	Paddy Ashdown	Leader 1988-99	A Fortunate Life: The Autobiography of Paddy Ashdown	2010	Aurum
	Norman Baker	MP for Lewes 1997-2015; Minister of State for Crime Prevention 2013-14	Against the Grain	2015	Biteback
	Vince Cable	Deputy Leader 2006-10; MP for Twickenham 1997-2015	Free Radical: A Memoir	2010	Atlantic
	Menzies Campbell	Leader 2006-7	My Autobiography	2008	Hodder & Stoughton
	Nick Clegg	Leader 2007–15, Deputy Prime Minister 2010-15	Politics: Between the Extremes	2016	Random House
	Tim Farron	Leader 2015-17	A Better Ambition: Confessions of a Faithful Liberal	2019	SPCK
	Jeremy Thorpe	Leader 1967-76	In My Own Time	1999	Biteback
	Shirley Williams	Leader in the House of Lords 2001-4	Climbing the Bookshelves: The Autobiography of Shirley Williams	2009	Little, Brown Book Group
	Chris Rennard, Baron Rennard	Chief Executive 2003-9	Winning Here: My Campaigning Life	2018	Biteback
	David Steel	Leader 1976-88; Liberal Leader 1976-88	Against Goliath: David Steel's Story	1989	Weidenfeld and Nicolson
	Jo Grimond	Leader 1956-67	Memoirs	1979	Holmes & Meier
	David Lloyd George	Prime Minister 1916-22; Leader 1926-31	War Memoirs of David Lloyd George	1933-7	Ivor Nicholson & Watson
	Bill Rodgers, Baron Rodgers of Quarry Bank	Leader in the House of Lords 1997-2001	Fourth Among Equals	2000	Politico's
	Cyril Smith	Chief Whip in the House of Commons 1976-7	Big Cyril: The Autobiography	1977	W. H. Allen
	Mark Oaten	Chair 2001-3	Screwing Up: How One MP Survived Politics, Scandal and Turning Forty	2009	Biteback
	Dick Taverne, Baron Taverne	MP for Lincoln 1962-74	Against the Tide: Politics and Beyond - A Memoir	2014	Biteback
	Roy Jenkins	SDP Leader 1982-3; Leader in the Lords 1988-97	A Life at the Centre	1991	Macmillan
	David Laws	MP for Yeovil 2001-15	22 Days in May: The Birth of the Lib Dem-Conservative Coalition	2010	Biteback
	David Laws	MP for Yeovil 2001-15	Coalition: The Inside Story of the Conservative-Liberal Democrat Coalition Government	2016	Biteback
	David Laws	MP for Yeovil 2001-15	Coalition Diaries, 2012–2015	2017	Biteback

== Others ==
=== Crossbenchers ===
- Memoirs by Thomas Bruce, 2nd Earl of Ailesbury (1890)
- Independent Member by A.P. Herbert (1950)
- The Memoirs of Lord Chandos: An Unexpected View from the Summit by Oliver Lyttleton, 1st Viscount Chandos (Bodley Head, 1962)
- Time to Declare by David Owen (1992)
- An Accidental MP by Martin Bell (2000)
- Spider Woman: A Life by Brenda Hale, Baroness Hale of Richmond (Penguin Random House, 2021)

=== UKIP ===
- Nigel Farage (Biteback)
  - Fighting Bull (2010)
  - Flying Free (2011)
  - The Purple Revolution: The Year That Changed Everything (2015)
- Guinea a Minute by Godfrey Bloom (2013)

=== SNP ===
- Stop the World: The Autobiography of Winnie Ewing by Winnie Ewing (2004)
- The Dream Shall Never Die: 100 Days that Changed Scotland Forever by Alex Salmond (HarperCollins, 2015)
- A Difference of Opinion: My Political Journey by Jim Sillars (2021)
- Frankly by Nicola Sturgeon (Pan Macmillan, 2025)
- Keeping the Dream Alive by Joanna Cherry (Icon Books, 2026)

=== Plaid Cymru ===
- For the Sake of Wales: The Memoirs of Gwynfor Evans by Gwynfor Evans (1996)

=== Minor Parties ===
- And Now, Tomorrow by Vernon Bartlett (1960)
- My Life by Oswald Mosley (1968)
- The Eleventh Hour: A Call for British Rebirth by John Tyndall (1988)
- Many Shades of Black: Inside Britain's Far-Right by John Bean (1999)
- Never Give Up!: Standing Tall Through Adversity by Nikki Sinclaire (2013)
- Honourable Friends? Parliament and the Fight for Change by Caroline Lucas (2015)
- The Great White Hope: The Life and Times of Alan ‘Howling Laud’ Hope by Howling Laud Hope (2020)
