= Tony Colston-Hayter =

British acid house party promoter

Tony Colston-Hayter (born December 1965) is a former British acid house party promoter who was active in the late 1980s and was later convicted for theft and fraud offences. Colston-Hayter played video games as a child and set up three businesses in that sector whilst still at school. He afterwards became a professional gambler, claiming to be the second-most successful blackjack player in the country.

Colston-Hayter became involved in the acid house music scene as a result of his late-night gambling. He saw a commercial potential for the music and in 1988 put on acid house party events at Lee International Film Studios in London, gaining publicity by inviting a film crew from ITV News at Ten. The following year, during the Second Summer of Love, Colston-Hayter moved his events to the countryside after having issues with venues in London. He developed a system of answerphone clues to guide people to the events, to avoid disruption from the police. Colston-Hayter unsuccessfully protested a change in law that increased the legal penalties for those organising such parties. By his own admission Colston-Hayter later abused A-class drugs and became involved in crime, carrying out bank thefts and frauds for which he received prison sentences in 2014, 2018 and 2023.

== Early life ==
Tony Colston-Hayter was born in December 1965, the son of a university lecturer and a solicitor. As a child he played video games and set up three businesses in the industry, whilst still at school in Buckinghamshire. One of Colston-Hayter's video games businesses managed a £1 million turnover before going bankrupt. At a national video games competition he met Paul Staines, who would become a publicist in Colston-Hayter's acid house ventures and is now a political blogger at Guido Fawkes. Colston-Hayter became a professional gambler; he claimed to be the second-best blackjack player in the United Kingdom and that he had to wear a disguise to enter many casinos as he had been banned for being too successful.

== Acid house ==
Because his gambling career meant that he left casinos late at night, when conventional nightclubs had closed, Colston-Hayter became involved in the underground acid house scene. He was a frequent patron of Shoom where he often spent thousands of pounds on champagne.

Colston-Hayter saw the commercial potential for acid house and, working as a promoter, was one of the first to popularise the music outside of the underground clubs. In August 1988 he put on acid house party and rave events named Apocalypse Now at Wembley Studios, London. This was one of the first largescale, commercial warehouse raves and, as a form of publicity, invited a crew from ITN to film the event. The footage was broadcast on the ITV News at Ten, the first time a rave had been televised. Because of his association with the music Colston-Hayter became known as the "acid house king".

Colston-Hayter experienced some issues with venues in London and so the next year, 1989 the Second Summer of Love, moved the raves into the countryside. His promotion company Sunrise held raves in farmers' fields, in stately homes and at Didcot Railway Centre. Such events were illegal if open to the public but Colston-Hayter exploited a legal loophole by positioning them as members only events. He still faced disruption from the police who attempted to shut down the events, in part due to mainstream media reporting of mass drug-taking. A dedicated police squad, the Pay Party Unit, was set up to crack down on events. To confuse the police Colston-Hayter's pre-event advertisements did not state a venue. Instead a phone number was given on which an answerphone message, stored on the BT Voicebank system, was progressively updated with directions closer to the event. The intention was to get as many attendees as possible to arrive before the police so that the authorities would be afraid to shut down the event without risking violence. Colston-Hayter had a Queen's Counsel barrister on site at events to provide legal advice.

On 8 July 1989, Colston-Hayter appeared on an After Dark television programme discussing gambling alongside Victor Lownes and Al Alvarez among others.

Colston-Hayter's fortunes began to change in 1990. He had had to cancel a Sunrise New Year's Eve party at the last minute when the venue pulled out and the company later closed. The Conservative Member of Parliament Graham Bright introduced a private member's bill, commonly referred to as the "Acid House Bill", to increase penalties on those organising unlicensed raves. Colston-Hayter and Staines campaigned against the proposed law and launched the "Freedom to Party" movement. However the campaign ended after a few months, with the bill being passed and becoming the Entertainments (Increased Penalties) Act 1990. A Guardian article in 2014 claimed that the motivation for Freedom to Party was the profit that Colston-Hayter received from T-shirt sales, rather than any real hope of preventing the bill from passing. As part of the protest Colston-Hayter handcuffed himself to Jonathan Ross on his One Hour with Jonathan Ross talkshow and, in the same event, threw a glass of water over music journalist Paul Morley.

== Theft and fraud offences ==
In January 2014 Colston-Hayter pleaded guilty to the theft of £1.3 million from Barclays bank; at this time he was of no fixed abode. He accepted that in 2012 and 2013 he had masterminded a scheme which saw gang members use at least three KVM switch devices installed on computers in bank branches to allow access to bank accounts. The scheme made 128 transfers to 41 separate money mule bank accounts. The gang also intercepted one million bank letters to 24,000 Barclays customers to obtain personal details. These were used as part of a telephone scam, using a device that spoofed the phone number of the bank, to obtain PIN numbers and other details from customers. The stolen data was used to purchase luxury goods such as Rolex watches, designer jewellery and Apple products from Harrods and Selfridges. In April 2014 Colston-Hayter was sentenced to five and a half years at Southwark Crown Court for his involvement in the scheme.

On 10 December 2018 Colston-Hayter, who had been released and was then living in Brighton, pleaded guilty at Southwark Crown Court to his involvement in another scheme. This scheme involved using a "semi-automatic social engineering bank telephone machine", that Colston-Hayter built at his home, to contact victims whose names, addresses, email addresses and phone numbers he obtained from a London private club database. The machine played a pre-recorded message purporting to be from the victim's bank. Colston-Hayter used details obtained in these calls to call the victim's bank. He used his device to alter his voice to match the age and gender of his victims. Colston-Hayter was tracked by the Metropolitan Police Cyber Crime unit and, when arrested, was in possession of a hard drive containing the passport and ID card particulars of his victims and the details of 32 credit cards. Colston-Hayter was sentenced to 20 months' imprisonment for nine offences. During his trial he claimed to have turned to crime after abusing Class A drugs.

Colston-Hayter was released from prison on 21 May 2019 and intended to write an autobiography. On 5 January 2023 he was arrested in London after being caught by members of the public in the act of stealing letters from letterboxes and was in possession of a crowbar. At the subsequent trial Colston-Hayter's defence stated that he was "desperate", suffering from a mental health condition and addiction. They said that he had stopped taking medication to try to help him to focus. He was convicted of theft and sentenced to ten months imprisonment.
