= Guido Fawkes =

Right-wing political website

- Website type: Blog
- Editor: Paul Staines
- Website: www.order-order.com
- Launched: 2004
- Current status: Active

Guido Fawkes is a right-wing political website published by British-Irish political blogger Paul Staines.

== History ==
In September 2004, Staines began writing an anonymous blog about British politics under the name of Guido Fawkes, an alternative name of Guy Fawkes, one of the group that plotted to blow up the Palace of Westminster in the Gunpowder Plot of 1605. In February 2005, The Guardian reported that the Fawkes blog shared a fax number with Staines. Although he subsequently refused to confirm the links, further media coverage continued to name Staines as Fawkes until the airing of a BBC Radio 4 documentary about him on 10 February 2007, which gave a detailed history and background, and prompted his blog post "So Much for Anonymity".

In 2005, Guido was voted the best in the Political Commentary category of The Backbencher Political Weblog Awards, run by The Guardian. It was not a survey of Guardian readers explicitly, but instead an internet poll linked to the Guido Fawkes website. In May 2006, Staines (as Guido Fawkes) co-authored a book with Iain Dale, which was critical of the Labour Party's practices since taking office in 1997.

In April 2006, Staines was one of numerous bloggers subject to an injunction from News International for publishing a picture of the undercover journalist Mazher Mahmood. Staines agreed to publish the photo if 10 other bloggers would do so. The picture remained on Guido, and, following legal action from George Galloway, was subsequently released into the public domain.

Guido reported the allegation that Deputy Prime Minister John Prescott was having an extramarital affair with an MP. It also named the woman in question, saying that such rumours had long been shared among Westminster journalists, but that the blog was being less hypocritical and breaking the clique by refusing to cover up such stories. The coverage of the Prescott affair drew considerable extra traffic to Staines's blog.

He was named at number 36 in the "Top 50 newsmakers of 2006" in The Independent, for his blog, and his role in the Prescott scandal in particular. In 2011 GQ ranked him, alongside co-author Harry Cole, jointly at number 28 in the magazine's list of the 100 Most Influential Men in Britain.

Staines encourages readers to forward political documents and information, which he publishes on his blog. One such leak was a strategy document for the Peter Hain for Deputy Leader of the Labour Party campaign. This leak caused embarrassment to Hain's campaign as it included information on MPs who had not gone public with their support, as well as others who were supposed to be independent.

"Tottywatch" is an irregular feature that comprises pictures of attendees at political events. Although the pictures are of both men and women, the majority are of attractive young women. Staines' wife is referred to as Mrs Fawkes and his daughters as Miss Fawkes and Ms Fawkes. On Monday mornings, the blog features a Monday Morning Point of View cartoon by "Rich&Mark", cartoonist Rich Johnston, archived at the RichAndMark website.

In 2012, RTÉ Radio 1 broadcast a documentary about Staines, Our Man in Westminster, as part of its Documentary on One series.

Vote Leave employee Tom Harwood was hired as a Guido reporter in July 2018; he left in 2021 to join GB News.

Staines has said that Steve Bannon, a former senior adviser to Donald Trump and head of Breitbart News, once tried to buy Guido. "That fell through over price," Staines told Press Gazette. "I never could work out whether we were talking dollars or sterling".

In November 2024, after celebrating the twentieth anniversary of Guido Fawkes, Staines announced he would be standing down as editor, with Ross Kempsell being confirmed as taking over the role.

== Exposés ==
=== Smith Institute allegations ===
Staines has made a number of posts on his blog relating to the Smith Institute, a charitable think tank set up in memory of former Labour leader John Smith, which he alleged to have engaged in party political activities (forbidden under charity law) and to have close links to Gordon Brown. These complaints led on 1 February 2007 to a formal investigation by the Charity Commission. The Commission threatened him with contempt of court proceedings if he did not release any documents, obtained from whistleblowers, relating to political activities by the Smith Institute. Staines stated on his blog that he intends to protect his anonymous sources.

=== Peter Hain ===
Staines has been credited with being the first blogger whose activities led to the resignation of a serving British minister; Peter Hain from the offices of Secretary of State for Work and Pensions and Secretary of State for Wales in January 2008.

=== Smeargate affair ===
Over the weekend of 11–12 April 2009, Staines exposed in his blog that a series of e-mails had been prepared by Damian McBride, a political adviser working at 10 Downing Street, smearing a number of Conservative MPs which had been sent to Derek Draper for consideration for publication on the Red Rag blogsite. This led to the resignation of McBride and expressions of regret to the MPs concerned from the prime minister, Gordon Brown. Staines provided copies of these emails to the News of the World and The Sunday Times and states that, contrary to the comments of his detractors, he did not receive any payments for this.

His success in the McBride affair has occasioned serious criticism from him of the UK lobby correspondent system, which he believes has succumbed to the ethos of political spin.

=== Leveson Inquiry ===
In late November 2011 Staines posted on his Guido Fawkes blog the Leveson Inquiry pre-submission of journalist and former Labour Party press secretary Alastair Campbell. All pre-submissions are given under strict and full confidentiality, and all core participants – including victims, the Metropolitan Police and the Crown Prosecution Service – are also signatories. Staines stated that he had obtained the submission legally. Lord Justice Leveson immediately called him to the inquiry to make a statement under cross-examination.

Staines gave written evidence denying any fault or breach of the Inquiry Act. At the start of his oral evidence to the Inquiry, Campbell admitted sending his evidence to "two or three journalists" and some friends. The order for Staines to appear was dropped.

In late December 2011 Staines was invited to give further evidence.

== Reception ==
Staines has been criticised for his approach to blogging. He often criticises the mainstream media, stating that they are too close to the political establishment and that they also keep internal secrets about political scandals from the public. When allegations about John Prescott's private life appeared, Staines wrote that "You can tell it is a big story because Nick Robinson is ignoring it". Robinson responded via his own blog, accusing Staines of having a political agenda to damage the government. These criticisms were echoed by Peter Wilby, in the New Statesman, who suggested that Staines's claims to have made the news on Prescott were unfounded, as the story had previously been covered in The Times, and that Staines' contribution to the debate was persistent implications of scandal without supporting evidence.

Colin Brown, in response to criticisms from Staines that the media are too cosy with politicians, said: "We would love to go into print with things that we hear and believe to be true, but cannot prove, but the libel laws are such that we cannot put things into newspapers that he [Guido Fawkes] seems to think that he can get away with on the internet. They don't seem to run by the same rules". Staines responded by stating that he is more vulnerable to libel suits than the print media are; as an individual, he does not have a large company backing him, although he says the fact that his blog is published through a Nevis-registered firm offers some protection, as plaintiffs are required to deposit US$25,000 in court before commencing any action in Nevis. The site is hosted in the United States to take advantage of First Amendment protections, and the editor Paul Staines is resident in Ireland.

The same firm is majority shareholder in MessageSpace, a blog advertising network that sells advertising space on many British political blogs, including PoliticalBetting.com, Iain Dale, ConservativeHome and Labourhome.

Staines was criticised by Iain Dale and Michael White in September 2010 for publishing rumours about William Hague, alleging that he shared a hotel room with his newly appointed special advisor. Hague confirmed he had shared a hotel room, but denied any "improper relationship". Later in February 2012, at the Leveson Inquiry, Staines said he had been paid £20,000 by the News of the World for a picture of Hague's special adviser, Christopher Myers, in a gay bar. The picture was not published by the News of the World.

In 2014, at Guido's tenth anniversary party, London Mayor Boris Johnson said that the site "has long been the dung on the rosebush of politics".

The Guardian's Anne Perkins has called Guido "a cross between a comic and a propaganda machine".

== Former Staff ==
A number of journalists began their career on the blog, including:

- Hugh Bennett, special advisor for Number 10
- Harry Cole, political editor of The Sun
- Tom Harwood, deputy political editor for GB News
- Ross Kempsell, political reporter for Talkradio
- Juliet Samuel, columnist for The Times
- Jim Waterson, media correspondent for The Guardian
- Alex Wickham, political correspondent for Politico Europe's London Playbook
- Christian Calgie, Senior Political Correspondent at the Daily Express.
