= Centreforce =

- United Kingdom
- Broadcast area: London, Merseyside, East Cheshire
- Frequencies: 12A (London DAB), 10D (Merseyside, Cheshire & North Wales DAB), 11C (Cheshire East)

Programming
- Format: House music, Old Skool

History
- First air date: 8 May 1989 (as a pirate); 14 July 2018 (legally on DAB)
- Former frequencies: 88.3 (as a pirate)

Links
- Website: centreforceradio.com

Centreforce also known as 88.3 Centreforce and Centreforce Radio is a former pirate radio station, now legally broadcasting to London, North West England and North Wales on DAB radio. It was instrumental during the Second Summer of Love period of acid house and rave music culture in the UK. The station is based in Waltham Abbey, Essex.

== Early history ==
Centreforce first broadcast on 8 May 1989, from Newham, East London on the frequency of 88.3 FM. In its short time on air (it ceased broadcasting little over a year later around June 1990), it became the "first seven day rave station", and a pivotal part of the scene, promoting all of the big M25 raves of the time such as Genesis, Energy, Sunrise, and Biology. Regular DJs on the station included one of the founders of the station Roger the Dodger, Kenny Ken, Danielle & Rochelle, DJ Randall, Keith Mac, Gary D, DJ One, Corporation Dave, DJ Huggs, DJ Connie, Hermit, and Linden C.

Centreforce was set up by Andy Swallow who also co-ran the Echoes nightclub in Bow, East London. Swallow was also involved with the infamous football hooligan firm Inter City Firm (ICF), and controversy around the ICF and its relationship to Centreforce regularly surfaced.

== Centreforce Sessions ==
After a brief return to the airwaves in 2007-2008 on 88.4FM, Centreforce teamed up with Time 107.5, a local legal radio station based in Romford, East London. Centreforce produced the weekend output on the station as Centreforce Sessions with shows and DJs including Jumping Jack Frost, Artful Dodger, Soul Syndicate (Peter P, Chris Phillips), Matt Jam Lamont, and Mr Buzzhard. This ran from June 2009 until April 2012 when a change of management at Time FM saw the relationship parting company.

== Internet and DAB Launch ==
Having returned once again throughout 2017 hosting weekly shows online, as of December 2017 Centreforce announced that they had been awarded a licence to broadcast to London on DAB. As of 14 July 2018, it commenced broadcasting on the Switch London 2 digital radio network. On 19 June 2020, the station launched on the Northeast Wales and West Cheshire MuxCo radio network.
