= Power Trip =

Power Trip may refer to:

== Film and television ==
- Power Trip (film), a 2003 American documentary by Paul Devlin
- Power Trip: Theatrically Berkeley, a 2009 documentary about Berkeley, California
- "Power Trip" (CSI: Miami), a 2008 TV episode
- "Power Trip / To Heck and Back", a 1993 episode of Rocko's Modern Life

== Music ==
- Power Trip (band), an American thrash metal band
- Power Trip (music festival), a 2023 heavy metal festival in Indio, California
- Powertrip, a 1998 album by Monster Magnet

=== Songs ===
- "Power Trip" (song), by J. Cole, 2013
- "Power Trip", by Chimaira from The Impossibility of Reason, 2003
- "Power Trip", by Jennie from Grand Theft Auto VI: The Album, 2026
- "Power Trip", by Lecrae from Gravity, 2012
- "Power Trip", by Soundgarden from Louder Than Love, 1989
- "Power Trip", by Yeat from 2093, 2024

== Other uses ==
- Power Trip: A Decade of Policy, Plots and Spin, a 2013 book by Damian McBride
- Power Trip, a 2022 scripted podcast starring Tatiana Maslany
- The Power Trip, a 2001 professional wrestling tag team consisting of Stone Cold Steve Austin and Triple H

== See also ==
- Powertrippin', a 1993 album by the Almighty
