= I'm Not the Only One (disambiguation) =

"I'm Not the Only One" is a 2014 song by Sam Smith.

I'm Not the Only One may also refer to:

- I'm Not the Only One (book), a 2004 autobiography of George Galloway
- "I'm Not the Only One", a song by Rene and Rene, composed by Milt Lance 1965
- "I'm Not the Only One", a song by Rancid from the EP Rancid 1992
- "I'm Not the Only One", a song by Laura Branigan, composed by D. Warren, from the album Branigan 2 1983
- "I'm Not the Only One", a song by Filter, composed R. Patrick, from the album Title of Record 1999, also Filter: The Very Best Things (1995-2008)
- "I'm Not the Only One", a song by Atlanta Rhythm Section, composed by Buddy Buie & Ronnie Hammond, from Truth in a Structured Form 1989 and Eufaula (album) 1999
- "I'm Not the Only One", a single by Ed Hale and The Transcendence from Sleep With You 2003

== See also ==
- Not the Only One (disambiguation)
- "Imagine" (John Lennon song), containing the line "I'm not the only one"
- "Rape Me" (Nirvana song), containing the line "I'm not the only one"
