= Memoir =

Type of autobiographical or biographical writing

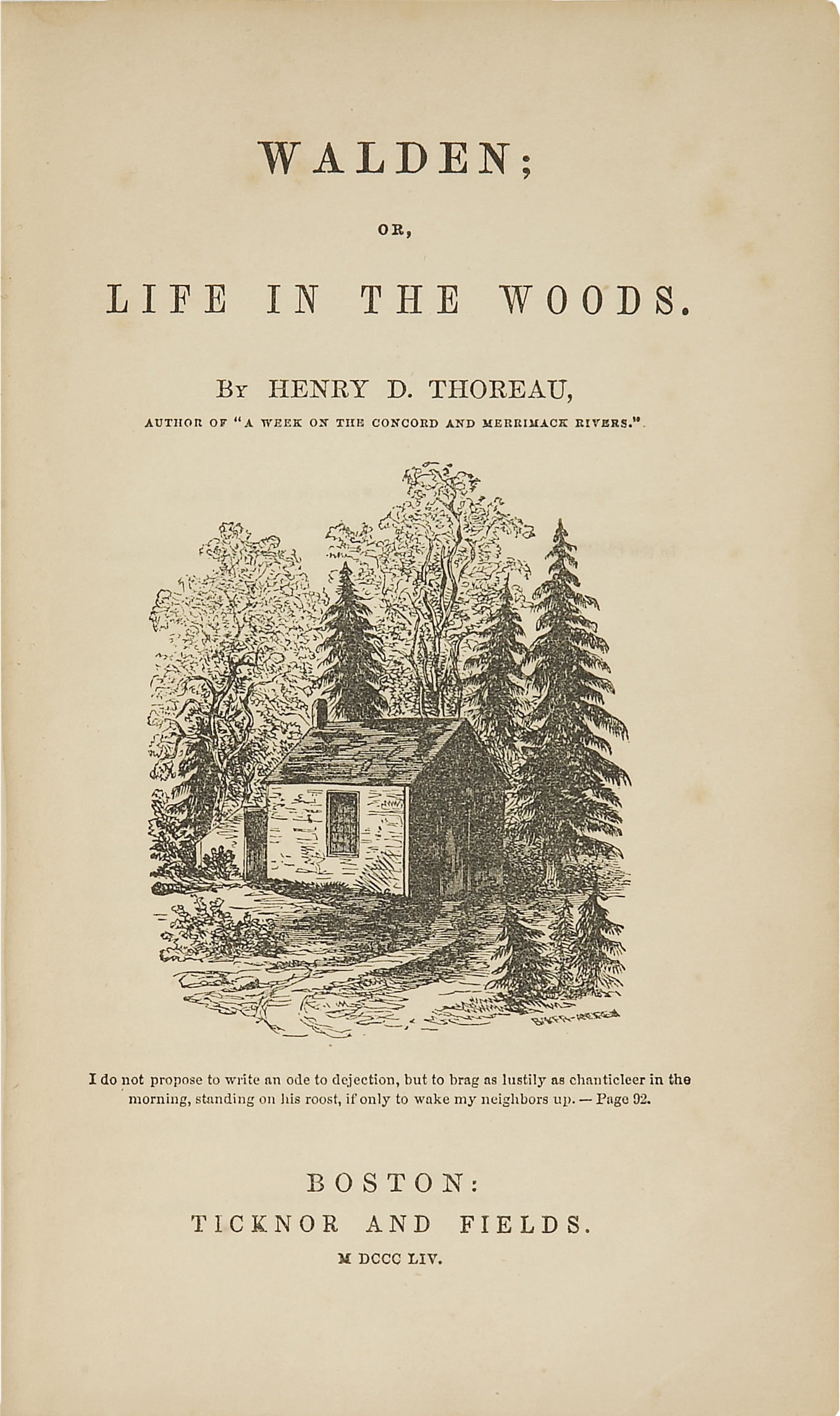
Title page of Henry Thoreau's memoir, Walden (1854)

A memoir (/ˈmɛm.wɑːr/; from French mémoire [me.mwaʁ], from Latin memoria 'memory, remembrance') is any nonfiction narrative writing based on the author's personal memories. The assertions made in the work are thus understood to be factual. While memoir has historically been defined as a subcategory of biography or autobiography since the late 20th century, the genre is differentiated in form, presenting a narrowed focus, usually a particular time phase in someone's life or career. A biography or autobiography tells the story "of a life", while a memoir often tells the story of a particular career, event, or time, such as touchstone moments and turning points in the author's life. The author of a memoir may be referred to as a memoirist or a memorialist.

== Early memoirs ==
Memoirs have been written since ancient times, as shown by Julius Caesar's Commentarii de Bello Gallico, also known as Commentaries on the Gallic Wars. In the work, Caesar describes the battles that took place during the nine years he spent fighting local armies in the Gallic Wars. His second memoir, Commentarii de Bello Civili (Commentaries on the Civil War) is an account of the events that took place between 49 and 48 BC in the civil war against Gnaeus Pompeius Magnus and the Roman Senate. The noted Libanius, a teacher of rhetoric who lived between an estimated 314 and 394 AD, framed his life memoir as one of his literary orations, which were written to be read aloud in the privacy of his study. This kind of memoir refers to the idea in ancient Greece and Rome that memoirs were like "memos": pieces of unfinished and unpublished writing which a writer might use as a memory aid to make a more finished document later on.

The Sarashina Nikki, written in the Heian period, is an example of an early Japanese memoir. A genre of book writing, Nikki Bungaku, emerged during this time. Themes of court life, introspection, and emotional expressiveness were frequently explored in Japanese memoirs; Sarashina Nikki is among the most well-known examples.

In the Middle Ages, Geoffrey of Villehardouin, Jean de Joinville, and Philippe de Commines wrote memoirs, and the genre was represented toward the end of the Renaissance in the works of Blaise de Montluc and Margaret of Valois—the latter being the first woman to write her Memoirs in modern-style. One of the first known examples of medieval memoir writing is Villehardouin's De la Conquête de Constantinople, which provided a first-hand narrative of the Fourth Crusade.

Other memoirs preceding the Age of Enlightenment of the 17th and 18th centuries included those of Anthony Ashley-Cooper, 1st Earl of Shaftesbury, François de La Rochefoucauld, Prince de Marcillac of France, and Louis de Rouvroy, duc de Saint-Simon, who wrote Memoirs at his family's home at the castle of La Ferté-Vidame. While Saint-Simon was considered a writer possessing a high level of skill for narrative and character development, it was not until well after his death that his work as a memoirist was recognized, resulting in literary fame.

== From the eighteenth century ==
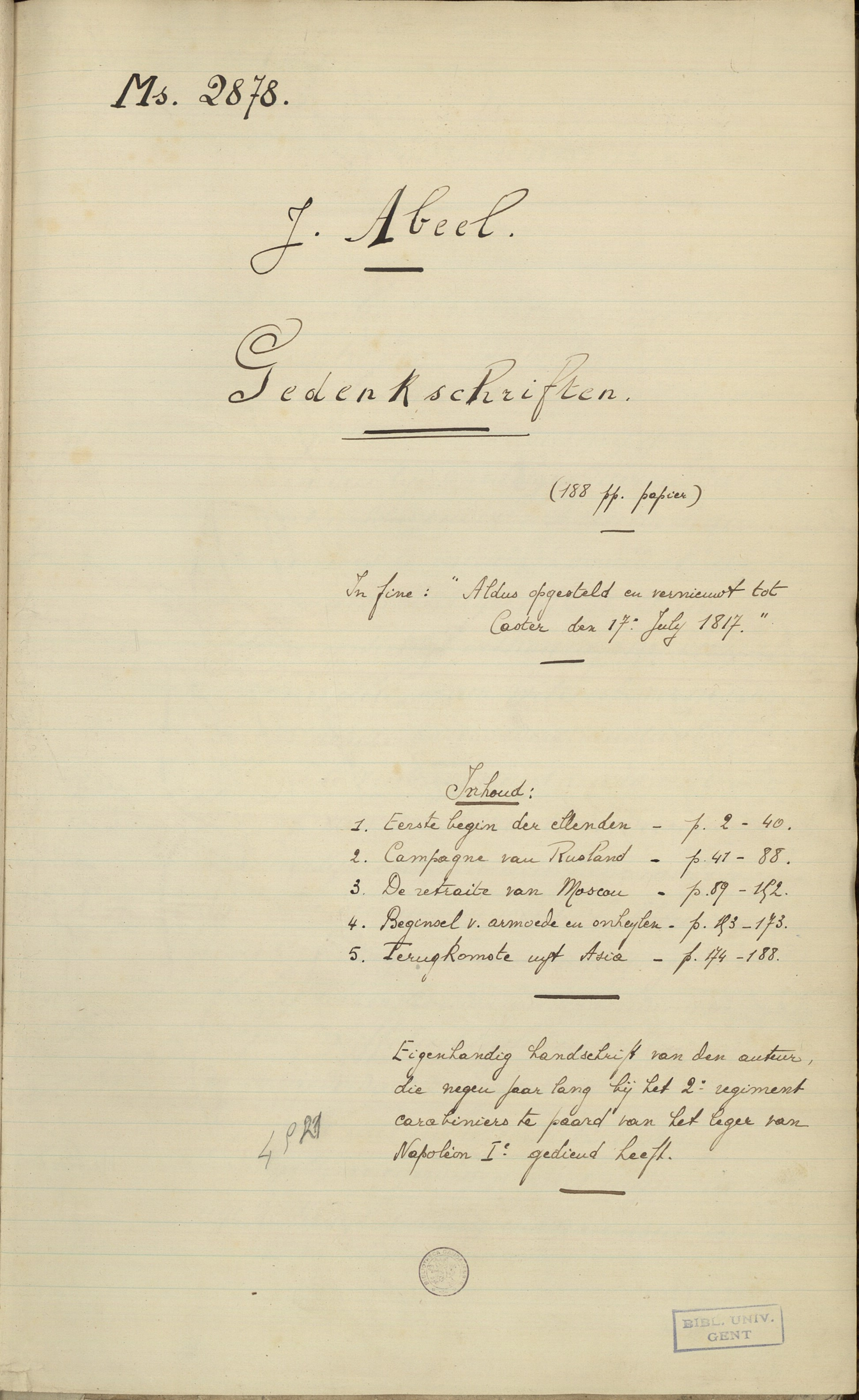
An excerpt from the manuscript "Memoires on Napoleon's campaigns, experienced as a soldier of the second regiment", written by Joseph Abbeel, 1805–1815.

Over the latter half of the 18th through the mid-20th century, memoirists generally included individuals notable within their chosen profession. These authors wrote as a way to record and publish their own account of their public exploits. Authors included politicians or people in court society and were later joined by military leaders and business people. An exception to these models is Henry David Thoreau's 1854 memoir Walden, which presents his experiences over the course of two years in a cabin he built near Walden Pond. Thoreau's memoir, which emphasized the individual's interaction with nature and independence, became a key work of American literature, especially within Transcendentalism.

Twentieth-century war memoirs became a genre of their own, including, from the First World War, Ernst Jünger (Storm of Steel) and Frederic Manning's Her Privates We. Memoirs documenting incarceration by Nazi Germany during the war include Primo Levi's If This Is a Man—which covers his arrest as a member of the Italian Resistance Movement, followed by his life as a prisoner in Auschwitz—and Elie Wiesel's Night, which is based on his life prior to and during his time in the Auschwitz, Buna Werke, and Buchenwald concentration camps.

== Memoirs today ==
=== Political people ===
According to American journalist Carlos Lozada, 21st century political memoirs fall into recognizable categories:

There is the sanitized precampaign memoir, gauzy life stories mixed with vague policy projects and odes to American goodness. There is the postcampaign memoir, usually by the losers, assessing the strategy and sifting through the wreckage. There are memoirs by up and comers who dream of joining the arena and by aging politicos rewriting their careers once more before the obits start to land. There are memoirs by former staff members who realize that proximity to power gives them a good story and memoirs by journalists who chronicle power so closely that they imagine themselves its protagonists.

Canadian scholar George Edgerton argues: "The late British historian George Peabody Gooch spoke of the mixture of vanity and pathos displayed in this quest to surmount the bounds of mortality. It is from this tradition that the modern political memoir has derived, in all its diverse forms." Cambridge University professor Andrew Gamble states that the rarest but potentially most valuable kind of memoir is the political diary.

=== Scientists ===
In the United Kingdom, Biographical Memoirs of Fellows of the Royal Society is a scholarly journal that publishes memoirs of leading scientists whether or not they were based in the UK. Together they comprise a significant historical record and most include a full bibliography of works by the subjects. The memoirs are often written by a scientist of the next generation, often one of the subject's own former students, or a close colleague. In many cases the author is also a Fellow. Notable biographies published in this journal include Albert Einstein, Alan Turing, Bertrand Russell, Claude Shannon, Ernst Mayr, and Erwin Schrödinger.

=== Ordinary people ===
In the early 1990s, memoirs written by ordinary people experienced a sudden upsurge, as an increasing number of people realized that their ancestors' and their own stories were about to disappear. At the same time, psychology and other research began to show that familiarity with genealogy helps people find their place in the world and that life review helps people come to terms with their own past. The popularity of the memoir field was also helped by the emergence of social media platforms, as people started writing down and sharing their personal stories to large audiences.

With the advent of inexpensive digital book production in the first decade of the 21st century, the genre exploded. Memoirs written as a way to pass down a personal legacy, rather than as a literary work of art or historical document, are emerging as a personal and family responsibility.

The Association of Personal Historians was a trade association for professionals who assisted individuals, families, and organizations in documenting their life stories. It dissolved in 2017.

== Collections ==
With the expressed interest of preserving history through the eyes of those who lived it, some organizations work with potential memoirists to bring their work to fruition. The Veterans History Project, for example, compiles the memoirs of those who have served in a branch of the United States Armed Forces – especially those who have seen active combat.

== Controversy ==
Memoirs are usually understood to be factual accounts of people's lives, typically from their early years, and are derived from the French term mémoire, meaning "reminiscence" or "memory." However, some works, which may be called free memoirs, are less strictly bound to remembered facts: "One type of life story is the free memoir, a form of nonfiction that, in presenting the past, deviates from factual and literal accuracy. This play of truth distinguishes the free memoir from the memoir per se, the word 'free' meaning what it does in free translation, that is, 'not literal or exact.'”

Alexandra Pringle, at the time Editor-In-Chief of a major editorial, alleged that a memoir is a "work of literature which is verging on fiction," and that therefore publishers have no responsibility for falsehoods.

== See also ==
- Autobiography
- Bildungsroman
- Biographical Memoirs of Fellows of the Royal Society, scientists worldwide
- Diary
- Fake memoirs
- Graphic memoir
- Histoire de ma vie
- Last will and testament
- List of autobiographies by presidents of the United States
- List of American political memoirs
- List of British political memoirs
