= Second Summer of Love =

1980s British social phenomenon

- Tabloid headline during the Second Summer of Love 1989
- Date: 1988–1989
- Location: United Kingdom
- Participants: Ravers, house musicians
- Outcome: Rise of acid house music, raves, and acid house parties

The Second Summer of Love was a 1980s social phenomenon in the United Kingdom which saw the rise of acid house music and unlicensed rave parties. Although primarily referring to the summer of 1988, it continued into the summer of 1989, when house music and the prevalence of the drug MDMA fuelled an explosion in youth culture culminating in mass free parties and the era of the rave. The music of this era fused dance beats with a psychedelic, 1960s flavour, and the dance culture drew parallels with the hedonism and freedom of the 1967 Summer of Love in San Francisco. The smiley logo is synonymous with this period in the UK.

== History ==
The Second Summer of Love began in 1988 in the UK, and rose from the house music British nightclubs dating from 1987 to 1988 Shoom (run by Danny Rampling), Future (run by Paul Oakenfold), Spectrum (run by Oakenfold and Ian St Paul), Trip (run by Nicky Holloway), and The Haçienda (run by Mike Pickering and Graeme Park). It was particularly associated with the sudden increase in independent gatherings outdoors in fields and in disused warehouses as well as with the new underground club scene, which had often become called raves. Beyond those held around London, events sprung up in areas such as Blackburn and Nottingham, before spreading across all the UK, with very large numbers of distinct gatherings held weekly by late summer of 1988. There were both illegal and legal gatherings in terms of adherence to event planning laws.

While the prime musical point of convergence throughout the phenomenon was house music at first mostly imported from the US underground nightlife centres Chicago, Detroit and New York, another basis for the scene was focused upon enabling people to open up to other genres of music. This was typically music seen as not very commercial for the time, including music of the hippie eras and some folk derived music.

Five DJs associated with the early British house music scene reported they were inspired to start these events after holidaying on Ibiza in the summer of 1987 with their friend Johnny Walker. Ibiza was where acid house music first became popular in Europe and the after-hours nature of the club scene emerged.

A smiley badge, a symbol of the period

In the early stages of the Second Summer of Love, the events and parties were often held in empty warehouses across the UK and were essentially illegal. Vague flyers around towns and cities advertised events and information travelled by word of mouth (as well as the newly popular mobile pager) between clubbers who were obliged to party incognito. Increasingly huge parties started to be put on around the M25 orbital of London by promoters including Biology (Jarvis Sandy, Micky Jump and Tarquin de Meza), Energy (Jeremy Taylor and Tin Tin Chambers), Genesis (Andrew Pritchard, Wayne Anthony and Keith Brooks), Sunrise & Back to the Future (Tony Colston Hayter and Dave Roberts) and Weekend World (Tarquin de Meza). In London, events were put on by Raindance and Labrynth.

1989 saw acid house explode, partly helped by the media attention, and also the big rave promoters. As Gavin Hills is quoted in Simon Reynold's Energy Flash, "1989 was the real explosion. The raves were very special. In some respects it was still underground, still something of a special club, even though it was a mass movement."

Against the backdrop of Thatcherite United Kingdom which had promoted individualism, it was both a reflection of, and a reaction to it.

The summer of 1989 also saw the forming of the Pay Party Unit, a national Police unit headed by Ken Tappenden. This unit attempted to disrupt and investigate not only those organising parties, but also record shops, clubs, and radio stations involved in their promotion.

The symbol of the time became a smiley face after the London crowd picked up the design when it was posted on one of the flyers from the third Shoom party. Revellers would soon become adorned in smiley t-shirts and badges. Clubgoers wore baggy clothing to combat the heat inside the clubs, and staff handed out ice pops. Water and Lucozade were a common feature because of the dehydrating effects of marathon dancing due to MDMA use.

=== Music ===
Acid house and hip house was typical of the Second Summer of Love. Acid house was characterised by the "squelching" bass produced by the Roland TB-303 and loud repetitive beats. It originated in Chicago and took on new qualities when it came to Europe. Songs from the period include "French Kiss" by Lil Louis, "On & On" by Jesse Saunders, "Mystery of Love" by Fingers Inc., "Love Can't Turn Around" by Farley "Jackmaster" Funk and Saunders (featuring Darryl Pandy), "I've Lost Control" by Sleezy D, and "Your Only Friend" by Phuture. Hip house would become a popular cross-over of a rap and house music, with tracks such as "Turn Up The Bass" by Tyree Cooper, "Who's In the House" by the Beatmasters, "Let It Roll" by Doug Lazy, and "That's How I'm Living" by Tony Scott.

=== Radio ===
The raves and music were promoted by pirate radio stations, including Kiss FM, Sunrise and Centreforce.

=== Drug use ===
Ecstasy was the drug of choice during the time. LSD was still present, just not as prominently. Mark Moore, of group S'Express, said: "It definitely took ecstasy to change things. People would take their first ecstasy and it was almost as if they were born again." Violence was uncommon due to the feelings of euphoria, love and empathy caused by ecstasy. Ecstasy use in raves is often linked to the reduction in football hooliganism at the time. The drug also increased the enjoyment of the music and encouraged dancing. Nicky Holloway, a DJ from the time, said: "The ecstasy and music came together. It was all part of the package. ... That may sound a little sad, but there's no way acid house would have taken off the way it did without ecstasy."

=== Media attention ===
British news media and tabloids devoted an increasing amount of coverage to the hedonistic scene, focusing increasingly on its association with club drugs. Early positive reports such as running articles on the "acid house" fashion would soon become sensationalist negative coverage. The moral panic of the press began in late 1988, when The Sun, which only days earlier on 12 October had promoted acid house as "cool and groovy" while running an offer on acid smiley face t-shirts, abruptly turned on the scene. On 19 October The Sun ran with the headline "Evils of Ecstasy," linking the acid house scene with the newly popular and relatively unknown drug. On 24 June 1989, the newspaper ran its infamous "Spaced Out!" headline after a Sunrise party.

=== Entertainments Bill and Freedom to Party ===
In December 1989, Conservative MP Graham Bright first proposed the Entertainments (Increased Penalties) Bill, increasing the fine for organising an unlicenced party from £2,000 to £20,000 as well as possible six months imprisonment. The bill would pass through Parliament during early 1990 and into law by the summer. The Freedom to Party rally was held on 27 January 1990 in response to the bill, with 8000 people descending onto Trafalgar Square.

== See also ==
- Balearic beat
- Madchester
- House music
