= Jag Singh =

British entrepreneur and political strategist

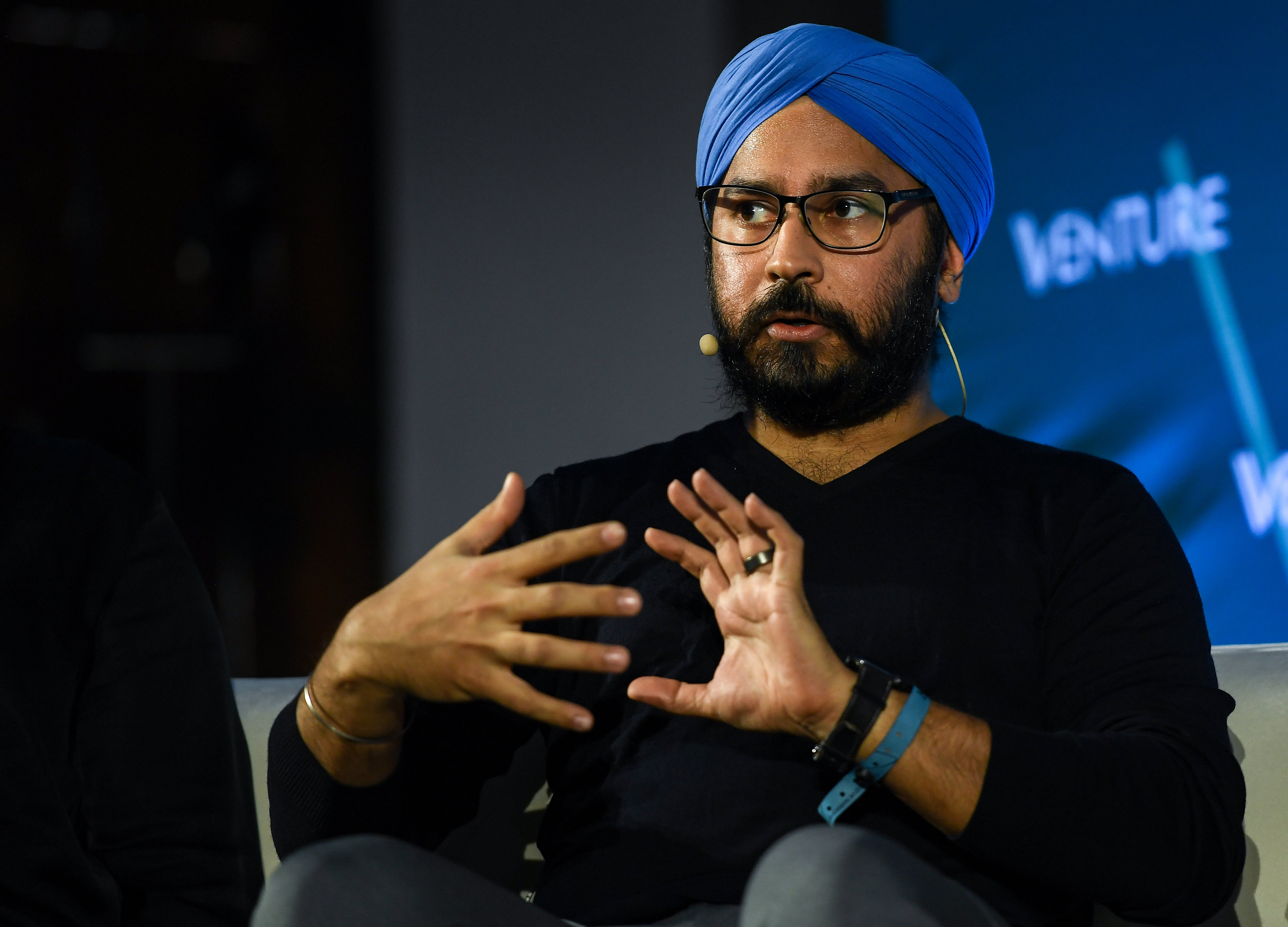
- Singh at Venture in Convento do Beato in Lisbon, Portugal prior to the start of Web Summit 2019.
- Born: London, United Kingdom
- Occupations: Internet entrepreneur; angel investor; former political strategist
- Years active: 2004–present
- Known for: Co-founder of Labourhome blog and involvement in digital political campaigns and startup investing
- Notable work: LabourHome, MessageSpace
- Title: Former Managing Director at Techstars Berlin

Jag Singh is a British Internet entrepreneur, angel investor, and former political strategist. He was co-founder of the now-defunct political blog Labourhome, co-founder of ad-network/agency MessageSpace, and has served as former Managing Director of the European accelerator Techstars Berlin. He is based in Berlin, Germany

== Career ==
He founded Labourhome, MessageSpace, and YouFundMe. LabourHome was acquired by the New Statesman Magazine in 2008.

In 2011, Singh worked as Director of Digital for the No To AV referendum campaign. Singh co-founded WESS Digital with Matthew Elliott, Paul Staines, and Andrew Whitehurst in 2013. The firm created a database based on issue-based campaigns to be used by political parties to analyse how people vote.

He was listed in Iain Dale and The Daily Telegraph's list of top 100 left wingers in 2008. In 2018, Singh was in the Financial Times list of the UK's top 100 black and minority ethnic leaders in technology.
