= Derek Draper =

British lobbyist (1967–2024)

- Born: Derek William Draper; 15 August 1967; Chorley, England
- Died: 3 January 2024 (aged 56); London, England
- Occupations: Lobbyist; psychotherapist
- Political party: Labour
- Spouse: Kate Garraway (m. 2005)
- Children: 2

Derek William Draper (15 August 1967 – 3 January 2024) was an English political lobbyist and psychotherapist.

As a political advisor, he was involved in two political scandals: "Lobbygate" in 1998, and another in 2009 while he was editor of the LabourList website. He authored two books, Blair's 100 Days and Life Support.

Draper made headlines in March 2020 when he contracted COVID-19 during the early days of the COVID-19 pandemic in England, and became seriously ill with an exceptionally serious case of long COVID; he was hospitalised for over a year and continued to require round-the-clock care upon release. He returned to hospital with extreme complications in December 2023, during which time he sustained a cardiac arrest and died on 3 January 2024.

== Early life ==
Derek William Draper was born in Chorley on 15 August 1967. He was educated at Southlands High School until 1984. He later attended Runshaw College in Leyland and the University of Manchester. While at the university, Draper provided hospitality for Ken Livingstone, who had missed his train after a Labour Club meeting. Livingstone was reportedly astonished to find a large poster of Labour's deputy leader Roy Hattersley displayed in Draper's student room. At around this time, he first met Charlotte Raven and later dated her.

== Career ==
Draper began his political career in 1990, when he became the constituency secretary for Nick Brown. In 1992, he left this job and went to work as a researcher for the MP for Hartlepool, Peter Mandelson. In 1996, he became a director of a lobbying firm called GPC Market Access, and was employed by them until early 1999. While working at GPC Market Access, he set up the New Labour organisation Progress with Liam Byrne. During the late 1990s, Draper worked as the Political Editor of the Modern Review, was briefly a columnist for the Daily Express, and a presenter on Talk Radio UK.

Seen as a close ally of Mandelson, and as an insider in the New Labour project, he was viewed by political journalists as well-connected, influential, colourful and gregarious, and was nicknamed "Dolly" in Westminster circles.

=== Lobbygate ===
In 1998, while still working as a director at GPC Market Access, Draper was caught on tape, with Jonathan Mendelsohn, boasting to Greg Palast (an undercover reporter from The Observer posing as a businessman) about how they could sell access to government ministers and create tax breaks for their clients. When the press got hold of the story, they dubbed it "Lobbygate". On the recording, Draper said that "there are 17 people who count in this government ... [to] say I am intimate with every one of them is the understatement of the century." Palast also wrote that Draper said, regarding his motivation: "I just want to stuff my bank account at 250 pounds an hour." According to Palast, "Draper was nothing more than a messenger boy, a factotum, a purveyor, a self-loving, over-scented clerk." Although he denied the allegations and accused The Observer of attempting to entrap him, he was widely ridiculed in the aftermath. Palast later wrote that the subsequent media coverage had over emphasised the role of lobbyists in the story at the expense of New Labour's "obsessional pursuit of the affections of the captains of industry and media ... twisting law and ethics to win the approval of this corporate elite".

Following his involvement in the "Lobbygate" scandal, Draper was sacked from his job at the Daily Express and generally shunned by Labour insiders. His friend Peter Mandelson said that Draper "has a fine intelligence, but sometimes I am afraid he misuses that intelligence. He gets above himself. But now he has been cut down to size and I think probably he will learn a very hard lesson from what has happened."

It was following this scandal that the phrase "cash for access" emerged and entered common political parlance.

=== After politics ===
After leaving politics, Draper retrained as a psychotherapist, obtaining an MA in clinical psychology after what he described as "three years in Berkeley, California". While in Berkeley, he worked as "the development director of a community counselling centre"; later, he claimed to have entered "private practice in Marylebone, London". He subsequently clarified that he had studied at the Wright Institute of California, a graduate school in the town of Berkeley, founded by Nevitt Sanford. (He was also reported in a Guardian gossip column as studying at the Tavistock Clinic.) Draper responded to the controversy surrounding his claimed psychotherapy degree, by denying the allegations completely and saying that this was "a brazen attempt to smear me by Guido Fawkes and David Hencke". He stated in 2009 that he was considering taking legal action against them.

Draper was a member of the British Association for Counselling and Psychotherapy (BACP). He wrote an occasional column for the Mail on Sunday newspaper on psychotherapy issues, and also wrote monthly columns in the magazines Psychologies and Therapy Today. He was also the author of a chapter in The Future of the NHS.

In response to a formal complaint the BACP announced on 24 November 2009 that it had

considered complaints received against Mr Draper concerning his involvement in an email scandal earlier this year which brought his profession as a psychotherapist into the public domain and therefore the name and reputation of BACP. An independent Appeal Panel was convened to consider the matter and decided, in the light of all the evidence and the commitments of Mr Draper, that his membership of this Association would not be withdrawn.

It further clarified Draper's qualifications:

Derek Draper has the following qualifications: An M.A. in Psychology from the Wright Institute in Berkeley (2004) and a second M.A. in the Foundations of Psychoanalytic Psychotherapy from the Tavistock Centre, London / Essex University (2009). The former was the result of three years' full-time study, the latter of two years of part-time study. As part of his first M.A. he undertook an extensive clinical training, undertaking over 1500 hours of supervised clinical work with different client populations and therapeutic modalities.

During the 2005 general election campaign, Draper urged people to vote tactically against Labour, saying, "I don't want my vote to be used as vindication for Tony Blair, I'd like him to wake up after the election and feel like a hunted man".

On 7 June 2009, emails that were highly critical of Gordon Brown that Peter Mandelson sent Draper in January 2008 were leaked to the News of the World which claimed that Brown was "insecure" and a "self-conscious person, physically and emotionally".

=== LabourList ===
During 2008, Draper made a return to British politics. He was described on the BBC television current affairs programme Newsnight, on 12 September 2008, as a Labour Campaign Advisor. Draper's position at that time was as an unpaid adviser to Ray Collins, the then General Secretary of the Labour Party.

Draper was the founder and editor of the LabourList website, which was launched in January 2009. He explained that he started the website in response to the increasing role that the internet was playing in British politics and so that Labourites would have their own place in the blogosphere. Contributors to his website included David Lammy, Peter Mandelson, James Purnell and Piers Morgan. Although LabourList was generally supportive of the Labour Party, it claimed to publish articles and views critical of the Labour government.

On 11 April 2009, it was reported by The Daily Telegraph that Gordon Brown's special adviser, Damian McBride, had sent a series of emails to Draper discussing plans to set up a blog which would be used to post false rumours about the private lives of senior or prominent members of the Conservative Party and their spouses. These smears would have included sexual and personal fabrications against MP Nadine Dorries, Conservative leader David Cameron and his wife, Samantha, and Shadow Chancellor George Osborne and his wife Frances.

The emails, which had been sent from the Downing Street Press Office, found their way to Paul Staines, who brought them to the attention of the media. McBride resigned later the same day, and 10 Downing Street issued an apology for the "juvenile and inappropriate" emails. Gordon Brown sent personal letters to those who had been mentioned in the emails, expressing his regret over the incident, but Conservative politicians called for him to make a public apology. Brown apologised a few days later while on a visit to Glasgow, saying that he was sorry about what had happened.

Draper later apologised for his part in the affair. Although in his reply to McBride's email he had described the idea as "absolutely totally brilliant", Draper claimed that he only responded to the email to gain favour from Downing Street for LabourList. A closer examination of Draper's emailed reply shows the plot was far more advanced, with Draper knowing that the controversial Red Rag blogsite had already been set up and offering to sort out the technology with trade union official Andrew Dodgshon.

In the wake of the incident, Labour sought to distance itself from Draper's LabourList blog, saying that his website is not owned by the Labour Party. Draper also came under pressure to resign his post as editor of LabourList, which he did in early May, saying "I regret ever receiving the infamous email and I regret my stupid, hasty reply. I should have said straight away that the idea was wrong."

== Personal life ==
Draper married television presenter Kate Garraway in 2005. They had two children together.

=== COVID-19 and death ===
Draper was hospitalised with COVID-19 in March 2020, and was admitted to an intensive care unit. He was still in critical condition, in an induced coma, after two months. The following month, he had opened his eyes, but remained in hospital in a serious condition. He was still in hospital a year later.

Draper returned home on a trial basis in April 2021; the following month, Garraway gave an update, saying that he was still devastated by COVID-19 and immobile. In September 2021, she reported that he was still receiving round-the-clock care and sleeping 20 hours a day. That month, she won a National Television Award for her ITV documentary Finding Derek, which chronicled his experiences with long COVID and the effects on their family. He received treatment in Mexico in February and March 2022. Garraway revealed in April 2022 that Draper was struggling to speak and that "he can understand, sometimes do odd words, but can't express himself". Draper required round-the-clock care. In December 2023, he suffered a cardiac arrest and was admitted to hospital again in what was called a "very serious condition".

Draper died on the night of 3 January 2024 at a north London hospital, from COVID-19 complications, at the age of 56, almost four years after he first contracted the disease. He was said to be one of the UK's longest-suffering COVID-19 patients.

Draper's funeral took place at the Church of St Mary The Virgin in Primrose Hill on 2 February 2024. Among the attendees were former prime minister Tony Blair, Labour leader Keir Starmer, Elton John, Myleene Klass, Fiona Phillips, and former Good Morning Britain presenter Piers Morgan. The current Good Morning Britain stars were also in attendance including Ben Shephard, Susanna Reid, Richard Madeley, Robert Rinder, Sean Fletcher and Richard Arnold.

== See also ==
- Cash for access
