= Not the Only One =

Not the Only One may refer to:

- "Not the Only One" (Fiction Factory song)
- "Not the Only One" (Bonnie Raitt song)
- "Not the Only One" by Nikka Costa from Pro Whoa
- "Not the Only One" by Papa Roach from Who Do You Trust?

== See also ==
- I'm Not the Only One (disambiguation)
