= Gabby Bertin, Baroness Bertin =

British Conservative member of the House of Lords and political aide

The Right Honourable The Baroness Bertin
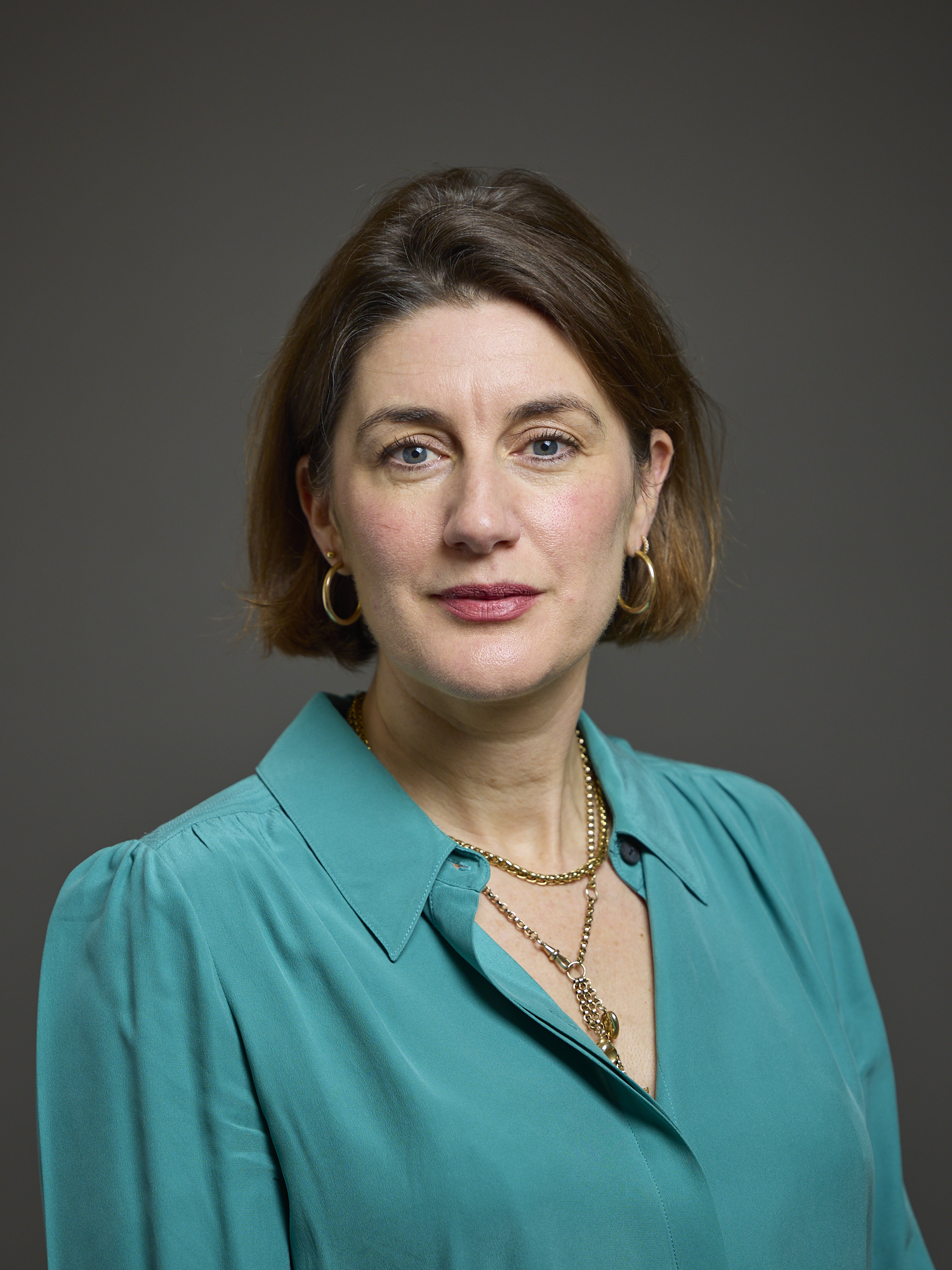
- Official portrait, 2026

Member of the House of Lords
- Lord Temporal
- Life peerage 2 September 2016

Downing Street Press Secretary
- In office 2010–2012
- Prime Minister: David Cameron
- Preceded by: Damian McBride
- Succeeded by: Susie Squire

Personal details
- Born: Gabrielle Louise Bertin; 14 March 1978 (age 48)
- Party: Conservative

Gabrielle Louise Bertin, Baroness Bertin (born 14 March 1978) is a British Conservative member of the House of Lords and political aide.

== Career ==
Bertin was educated at Croydon High School and Southampton University.

She worked for Cameron during his time as shadow education secretary, and for Liam Fox as press secretary. In 2005, Bertin became deputy press officer for Cameron.

In 2003–04, she was paid £25,000 by Pfizer to work as a researcher for The Atlantic Bridge, a now-closed charity run by Fox, while he was shadow health secretary. She was the sole employee of the charity, and worked with Adam Werritty, the executive director, but according to Fox, she did not work in any health role.

By August 2013, it had been announced that she would be switched to director of external relations, with Graeme Wilson of The Sun taking up her old role.

She was nominated for a life peerage as part of David Cameron's Resignation Honours list and was created Baroness Bertin, of Battersea in the London Borough of Wandsworth, on 2 September 2016. She was the youngest member of the House of Lords until the induction of Baroness Blackwood of North Oxford in February 2019.

In 2023, she was commissioned by the Government to lead an independent review into the regulation of online pornography; the concluding report was published in early 2025.

Government offices
Preceded by Damian McBride	Downing Street Press Secretary; 2010-2012	Succeeded by Susie Squire
