= Red Rag =

Planned British political website

The Red Rag blogsite was at the centre of a UK political scandal that became known as Smeargate. The scandal broke on 11 April 2009 when it was reported that Gordon Brown's special adviser, Damian McBride, had sent a series of emails to New Labour political blogger Derek Draper discussing plans to set up the blog which would be used to post false rumours about the private lives of senior members of the Conservative Party and their spouses. The website was never launched according to The Register. The emails from January 2009, which had been sent from the Downing Street Press Office, were initially leaked to blogger Paul Staines.

Draper and McBride initially tried to play down the plans. McBride stated "To call it an orchestrated smear campaign is ridiculous. It was just some ill-judged gossip between friends which was never meant to see the light of day. They appear to be some ideas – laid out in embarrassing detail – for stories which could appear on a Left-wing version of the Guido Fawkes blog called Red Rag. They’re all stories which have been doing the rounds in Westminster for a while, written up in a scurrilous style. But the website has never appeared, so it’s hard to see what it was all about."

McBride resigned on 11 April 2009 after it was discovered that the site had been registered since November 2008 and the planned launch was only stopped in April 2009. Draper resigned as editor of LabourList on 7 May 2009.
