= The Abuse of Power =

2023 book by Theresa May

- Author: Theresa May
- Publisher: Headline
- Publication date: 14 September 2023
- Pages: 352
- ISBN: 978-1035409884

The Abuse of Power: Confronting Injustice in Public Life is a book by former British Prime minister, Theresa May published in 2023. The book explores how power is abused by public institutions and those who run them. It explores the police response to the Hillsborough disaster, Windrush scandal, the Grenfell Tower fire, the Rotherham child sexual exploitation scandal, the British Post Office scandal, and the use of stop and search powers by the police.

== Critical reception ==
Andrew Rawnsley reviewing in The Guardian commented that the prose was plain but punchy. Róisín Lanigan writing in the Irish Independent criticises May's writing and says that May has a lack of self-awareness.

Rawnsley comments that May's description of the Windrush scandal deflects from her responsibility as a Home Secretary.

Rawnsley says that the inclusion of a chapter on Brexit and the assertion that her opponents were abusing power was bizarre and "repulsive" given the other examples included in the book. Tom Peck, writing in The Independent, comments that many of the claimed abuses of power related to Brexit would be viewed as entirely legitimate tactics by others.

Writing for the Literary Review, Tim Bale said: "According to the veteran political journalist Andrew Marr, political memoirs serve three purposes: 'to settle scores, to nudge the dial of the historical verdict, and above all to win a publisher’s advance that is unlikely to be earned out'. May, whatever she might claim, is clearly attempting to do the first and the second of these – in neither case very successfully".
