= Damian McBride =

Former civil servant and special adviser

Downing Street Press Secretary
- In office 2007–2009
- Prime Minister: Gordon Brown
- Preceded by: Tom Kelly
- Succeeded by: Gabby Bertin

Personal details
- Born: 1974 (age 51–52) London, England
- Party: Labour
- Education: Finchley Catholic High School
- Alma mater: Peterhouse, Cambridge
- Occupation: Civil servant, school business liaison officer

Damian McBride (born 1974) is a British political advisor. He is a former Whitehall civil servant and special adviser to British Prime Minister Gordon Brown. McBride began his civil service career at HM Customs and Excise. He worked with Customs and Excise and later became Head of Communications at the UK Treasury, before becoming a special adviser. In 2024 he was appointed a special adviser to Yvette Cooper, Home Secretary in the Labour government of Keir Starmer. In 2026, he moved with Cooper, upon her appointment as Secretary of State for Health and Social Care.

On 11 April 2009, he resigned his position after it emerged on a political blog that he and another Labour Party advisor, Derek Draper, had exchanged emails discussing the possibility of disseminating rumours McBride had fabricated about the private lives of some Conservative Party politicians and their spouses. The emails from McBride had been sent from his 10 Downing Street email account.

== Early life ==
McBride was born and raised in North London to English and Scottish parents. He was educated at Finchley Catholic High School, a boys' state school in London. He attended Peterhouse, Cambridge, where he studied history. He wrote his final-year dissertation in praise of inciting violence and rumour-mongering in politics titled "Far More Important Than Politics? Public Policy and the Impact of Urban Riots, 1964–8". The thesis was supervised by Tony Badger, who later commented: "We disagreed over the value of the riots – I thought they were counter-productive – but he was very focused, and it was an excellent thesis". Badger tried to persuade McBride to do a PhD.

== Career ==
Following a career with HM Customs and Excise, McBride joined Her Majesty's Treasury while Gordon Brown was Chancellor of the Exchequer, and after coming to the attention of Brown he was appointed Head of Communications at the department in 2003. Within two years he was working as Brown's special adviser, and oversaw his campaign to become prime minister in 2007.

=== Power struggle ===
McBride was revealed to have sent an email to Sky Television in December 2006 in which he attacked Sky for hiring Stephen Byers and Alan Milburn, two former cabinet ministers who had been close to Tony Blair, as Labour commentators. Some in the Labour Party called for his resignation, but he survived. In 2008, he was reported to have been involved in a power struggle with Gordon Brown's senior strategist Stephen Carter, which resulted in Carter being removed from his position and given a peerage and ministerial position.

=== Media leak ===
During the 2008 Labour Party Conference, McBride was criticised after briefing journalists about Ruth Kelly's resignation as Secretary of State for Transport several hours before she was due to make an official announcement on the subject. Alistair Darling, in his book Back From the Brink, writes that McBride also briefed against Harriet Harman at the same conference, but Harman overheard him. Following these incidents, McBride ceased to deal with the media on a regular basis and was appointed Head of Strategic Planning in Downing Street.

=== Smear campaign ===
On 11 April 2009, it was reported by The Daily Telegraph that McBride had sent a series of emails to former Labour Party official Derek Draper discussing plans to set up the Red Rag blog which would be used to post rumours they had made up about the private lives of senior and high-profile members of the Conservative Party. These false rumours were to have included sexual and personal allegations about Conservative politicians and their spouses, including Nadine Dorries, David and Samantha Cameron, and George and Frances Osborne. McBride conceded in his emails that he had used "poetic licence" in respect of existing gossip and rumours.

The emails, which had been sent from the Downing Street Press Office, were acquired by Paul Staines, known for his Guido Fawkes blog, who brought them to the attention of the media. McBride resigned later the same day, and 10 Downing Street issued an apology for the "juvenile and inappropriate" emails. Gordon Brown later sent personal letters to those who had been mentioned in the emails, expressing his regret over the incident, but Conservative politicians called for him to make a public apology. Brown apologised five days later while on a visit to Glasgow, saying that he was sorry about what had happened.

Brown apologised for a second time on 22 April, at the first Prime Minister's Questions following the Parliamentary Easter recess, after Nadine Dorries asked him if he would like to take the opportunity to apologise to her. On 25 April, it was confirmed that Dorries intended to take legal action against McBride for the false allegations which had been made against her. On 7 September 2009 it was confirmed that Dorries would sue McBride and Derek Draper, and also take legal action against 10 Downing Street.

In his first interview on the subject of the email scandal in July 2009, McBride said that when he told Brown what he had done, the Prime Minister was so angry that he could not speak. Brown had also felt "incredibly let down". He also insisted that his job as special adviser to the Prime Minister had not involved this type of work and that emailed slurs were not characteristic of the way the Prime Minister ran his government. Chris Mullin, in his diaries, remarks "for all his [Brown's] high-minded posturing, everyone knows this is Gordon's modus operanti." The affair was also part of the reason Alice Mahon resigned form the Labour Party a week later.

=== Post Downing Street ===
Following his resignation from Downing Street, McBride applied for the post of Business Liaison Officer at his former school, Finchley Catholic High School, and started work there in July 2009. In 2011, he became head of media at the charity CAFOD.

In 2013, McBride's book, Power Trip: A Decade of Policy, Plots and Spin, was published. McBride offered royalties from the book to CAFOD, but after consulting "the wider Catholic community" CAFOD's trustees and management declined the offer. McBride stated his intention to donate all royalties to "good causes."

=== Return to Labour ===
In 2015, he returned to a senior role in the Labour party as Shadow Defence Secretary Emily Thornberry's media adviser.

In September 2017, the political commentator Iain Dale placed McBride at Number 95 on his list of the '100 most influential people on the Left', on the grounds that "McBride more than anyone has helped Emily Thornberry to rise up this chart this year."

After the 2024 election he was appointed special adviser to Yvette Cooper, Home Secretary and wife of his former Treasury colleague Ed Balls, specialising in fraud policy.

== Personal life ==
McBride is a fan of Arsenal and Celtic football clubs. He is also a regular pub quiz competitor.

Government offices
| Preceded by Tom Kelly | Downing Street Press Secretary; 2007–2009 | Succeeded by Gabby Bertin |
