= Tom Harwood =

British journalist

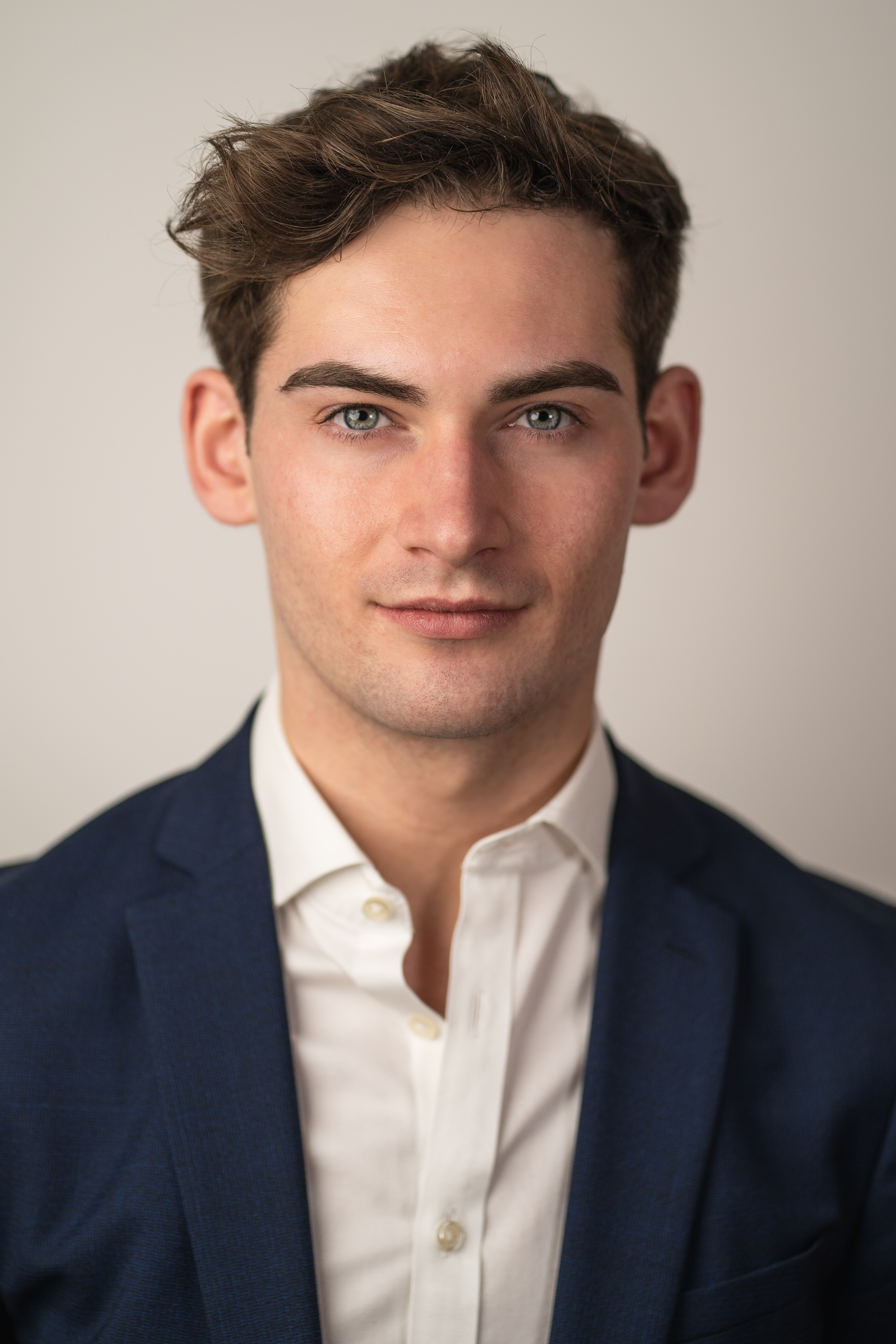
- Harwood in 2021
- Born: Thomas Hedley Fairfax Harwood; 26 August 1996 (age 30); Cambridge, England
- Education: St Mary's College, Durham University (BA)
- Occupations: Journalist, political commentator
- Website: tomharwood.uk

Thomas Hedley Fairfax Harwood (born 26 August 1996) is a British journalist, political commentator and television show host. He became the US Political Editor of GB News in September 2026, having previously served as Deputy Political Editor since March 2023. Harwood previously worked as a reporter for the right-wing political news website Guido Fawkes between 2018 and 2021, and was a regular contributor to The Daily Telegraph, writing online columns from 2019 to 2021.

== Early life and education ==
Harwood was born on 26 August 1996. His father Oliver (1959–2023) was a property consultant and his mother Helen is a primary school teacher. He grew up in Cambridge, England. Harwood attended The Perse School, a private school in the city.

He studied politics at Durham University, where he was elected as president of its debating society, the Durham Union. Harwood ran a satirical campaign to become a National Union of Students (NUS) delegate, criticising the organisation with viral videos and satirical pledges such as using its funds to build a Death Star, and defeating the terrorist group ISIS with a boycott. He was elected in what The Times newspaper described as "a landslide victory" that gained national attention in December 2016. After his election, he appeared on the BBC's Daily Politics show.

Harwood later ran for the presidency of the NUS in 2017 with a similar campaign and was endorsed by the University of Manchester Students' Union. The union was the only one to hold a primary election in which students could directly vote for their candidate. Their vote mandated their delegates to vote for him in the NUS presidential election. He finished a distant third in the election with 35 votes out of the 1,200 NUS delegates. In the following year, Harwood appeared on the BBC's Daily Politics show again due to another satirical campaign to lower the voting age to 12.

== Career ==
While at university, Harwood also became the national chair of pro-Brexit campaign group Students for Britain, an arm of the official Brexit campaign organisation Vote Leave. In 2017, he worked for the American libertarian organisation Students for Liberty. He was a Conservative Party candidate for the East Chesterton ward in the 2018 Cambridge City Council election. In the election, the two Labour candidates were elected. Harwood received 336 votes, and finished in 6th place. Harwood became a reporter for the right-wing political news website Guido Fawkes in July 2018.

Harwood was listed in talk radio station LBC's list of top 100 most influential Conservatives of 2019. Harwood was briefly a member of Turning Point UK, an offshoot of the US right-wing student organisation Turning Point USA, distancing himself from the group days after it launched, saying that he did not realise its political positions would be aligned with those of the US organisation, which he opposes. He contributed opinion pieces to The Telegraph between 2019 and 2021. In 2019, at the age of 22, he became the youngest panellist to appear on a regular edition of the BBC debate programme Question Time.

In 2021, Harwood joined GB News as its political correspondent. In August 2021 it was announced that he would host a new programme on the channel, The Briefing: AM with Tom Harwood. Harwood was promoted to Deputy Political Editor of GB News in March 2023.

In October 2025 he became a columnist for City A.M. newspaper.

In September 2026 he was appointed US Political Editor of GB News and relocated to Washington DC.
