= Genesis '88 =

Party promotion crew in the UK

Genesis'88 was a party promotion crew who threw some of the first acid house parties also known as raves in the United Kingdom from 1988 to 1992.

It was founded during 1988 during the UK's discovery of acid house. They were an organisation that staged acid house parties in empty industrial warehouses in London and within the M25 motorway area. "Over the course of 1989, promoters such as World Dance, Genesis, Helter Skelter and Energy succeeded in setting acid house nights free of the urban core's constructions, staging ever more elaborate Orbital parties in borrowed and rented fields, the odd warehouse, or some other similarly vacant structure". At that point in time acid house parties were deemed illegal by authorities because most promoters of the period gained entrance into buildings by breaking and entering.

== Overview and history ==
Fuelled by the drug MDMA (Ecstasy), nightclub goers in London were desperate for events that catered to their needs and went on until the early hours of the morning. Genesis found empty warehouses in London and transformed them into state-of-the-art dance arenas that consisted of professional lighting rigs, sound systems and colourful decorations. Unbeknownst to the buildings' owners, the Genesis promoters would wear their best business suits and convince police riot squads that the warehouses were acquired through legitimate channels. In one reported case, they came face-to-face with the owner of a building and managed to convince him that they had acquired the property legitimately.

Matthew Collin writes in Altered State: The Story of Ecstasy Culture and Acid House: "From their first party in October 1988 onwards, Genesis developed a prodigious reputation for cracking open huge warehouses and holding illegal raves, week after week, from Aldgate to Hackney, Tottenham to Walthamstow".

To give themselves more credit, they would assume official titles such as George Michael’s personal manager or project manager for a major record company. Genesis enjoyed a succession of events that saw attendances rise from 300 to 8,000 people. Victims of their own success, Genesis were targeted by the UK government and the criminal underworld attracted by media articles of huge profits (£500,000) being made by such promoters. Wayne Anthony claimed to have been kidnapped and threatened with death if they didn’t comply with the gangsters. They demanded 25% of all profits in return for 24-hour protection. This plight was shared by other promoters who had also encountered the same terror tactics.

This, coupled with the government's label of "Public Enemy No.1", brought about the end of illegal acid house parties. Genesis continued arranging parties until 1992 before deciding to quit staging these events. One of the promoters Wayne Anthony, penned a book called Class of 88 - The True Acid House Experience (ISBN 0-7535-0240-2). Genesis founding promoter Andrew Pritchard wrote a memoir about the events titled "Empire of Dirt"- From Raves To Riches: A Story of Identity, Crime, Corruption, and Redemption (ISBN 978-1919372600). The book includes a full catalogue of the original Genesis Party Flyers, which confirms dates of events.

== Genesis events ==
=== 1988 ===
- Genesis - Chapter One - Saturday 10 December @ Aldgate East, London
- Genesis - The Struggle Continues - 24 December 1988 Christmas Eve @ Leaside Road, Upper Clapton Road, East London
- Genesis - Boxing Day, Monday 26 December 1988 @Leaside Road, Upper Clapton Road, East London
- Genesis & Sunset(Sunrise) - To The Final Party - Saturday 31 December 1988 New Years Eve @ Leaside Road, Upper Clappton, East London

=== 1989 ===
- Genesis & Sunset(Sunrise) Genesis 89 Sunset - Chapter 6- Saturday 7 January 1989 @Leaside Road, Upper Clappton, East London
- Genesis & Sunset (Sunrise) Genesis 89 Sunset – Against All Odds - Saturday 14 January 1989 @ Shen-Ola, Wateren Rd, Hackney Wick, relocated to Danley Road, Hackney, East London
- Genesis 89' Sunset (Sunrise) & Pasha- The Promised Land-Saturday 21 January 1989 @ Bow Flyover, East london
- Genesis 89' Sunset (Sunrise) & Pasha - From Strength To Strength - Saturday 28 January 1989 @ Lee Valley Industrial Estate, East London
- Genesis 89' - Struggle of Struggles- Saturday 4 February 1989 @ Canning Town, East London
- Genesis 89' - Chapter of Chapters - Saturday 11 February 1989 @ Ferry Lane, North London
- Genesis 89' - Only Love Conquers Hate - Part 1 - Saturday 18 February 1989 @ Ferry Lane, North London
- Genesis 89' - Only Love Conquers Hate- Part 2 - Saturday 25 February 1989 @ Ferry Lane Rd, new venue on the opposite side of the road, North London
- Genesis 89' - The Promised Land - Saturday 4 March 1989 @ Picketts Lock, North London; Event raided by the police.
- Genesis 89' - Live & Let Live- Part 1- Saturday 11 March 1989 @ Beckton, East London; Event raided by the police.
- Genesis 89' - see No Evil, Hear No Evil, Speak no Evil - Saturday 18 March 1989 @ Police raided before setting up.
- Genesis 89' & Pasha- Two Forces Pull Together - Saturday 25 March 1989 @ Event raided by police before setting up.
- Genesis 89' Saturday 1 April 1989 @ Event raided before setting up.
- Genesis 89' & Four's Company - Tranquility- Wednesday 5 April 1989 @ Echos Nightclub, Bow Road, East London
- Genesis 89' Saturday 8 April 1989 @ Event raided before setting up.
- Genesis & Four's Company- Tranquility - Wednesday 12 April 1989 @ Echos nightclub, Bow Road, East London
- Genesis 89' & Pasha - No Surrender - Saturday 15 April 1989 @ The Old Bow Liberary, Bromley by Bow.
- Genesis 89' Saturday 22 April 1989 @Event raided before setting up.
- Genesis 89', Unit 4, Pasha & Balera - Saturday 29 April 1989 @ South Wall Road Paddington, West London. Event raided by police before setting up.
- Genesis 89' & Pasha - Fee At Last- Bank Holiday Monday 1 May 1989 @ Basildon Festival Hall, Essex. Stabbing incident.
- Genesis & Biology- The Empire Strikes Back - Saturday 9 September 1989 @ Farmers field in Meopham, Kent.
- Genesis 89'- Resurrection - Saturday 16 September 1989 @ London Road, Southend -on -Sea, Essex.
- Genesis’89 & Biology - Future Power People - 31 December 1989.

=== 1990 ===
- Freedom to Party – Why Can't We Dance? - 27 January
- Genesis’90 & Fantasy FM Radio – The Warehouse Experience
- Genesis - Imagine - 13 December

=== 1992 ===
- Genesis’92 – The Awakening - 18 April
- Genesis’92 – The Promised-Land - 16 May

== See also ==
- Sunrise / Back to the Future – another promoter
- List of electronic music festivals
- Breakbeat hardcore
- Criminal Justice and Public Order Act 1994
- Disc jockey
- Electronic music
- Free party
- Hardcore
- House music
- Rave
- Techno music
