= Labourhome =

Left-wing media outlet based in the UK

- Logo after 2007 relaunch
- Website type: Political blog
- Available in: English
- Owners: Alex Hilton, Jag Singh, Mike Danson
- Website: labourhome.org
- Commercial: No
- Launched: 20 June 2006
- Current status: Closed (2012)
- Content license: Attribution-NonCommercial-ShareAlike Generic 2.5 (CC BY-NC-SA 2.5)

Labourhome was a popular political blog specializing in British politics started by Alex Hilton and Jag Singh. Launched in 2006, the site targeted supporters of the British Labour Party. In 2009, it was named in a libel case about who is liable for libelous contributions, which was dismissed by the Court of Appeal in 2011. The blog became inactive in 2012.

== History ==
Labourhome was launched in 2006 with the tagline "Back to the roots", targeting supporters of the British Labour Party.

The site was re-launched on 10 May 2007, the day British Prime Minister Tony Blair resigned as Leader of the Labour Party. Labourhome was not a standard forum-based website, but rather a collaborative blog, which allowed registered members to contribute articles to the site.

The site garnered attention early in its history, when Labour Party Chair and Minister without Portfolio Hazel Blears posted an entry on the site. In 2008, former Deputy Prime Minister John Prescott started writing on the site. In July of that year, New Statesman publisher Mike Danson bought out one of the co-founders.

In September 2008, a Labourhome user survey was used as the basis of a The Independent front page article claiming that Labour activists wanted Prime Minister Gordon Brown to stand down, leading to some criticism of Labourhome from within the Labour Party.

In May 2009, the website switched from using bespoke blogging software to WordPress, with a significant change in appearance. The site was further revamped in March 2010 in preparation for the general election, and updated to use the Hashcash anti-spam plugin.

Also in 2009, the site became embroiled in a libel legal case about who is liable for libelous contributions. This finally came to an end in the Court of Appeal in March 2011 with the libel case being struck out as not worth pursuing when considering the minimal actual damage against the costs of the litigation.

The site became inactive for a while after the 2010 general election, resuming activity in August 2011. Labourhome again became inactive in April 2012.
