= Acid house party =

Type of illegal party typically staged in warehouses in the UK in 1987–1989

An acid house party was a type of illegal party typically staged in abandoned warehouses between 1987 and 1989. Parties played acid house and acid techno music, electronic music genres with a distinct sound from the use of the Roland TB-303 synthesizer. The origin of the term acid house party is disputed coming either from the 1987 song "Acid Tracks" by Phuture, or the consumption of MDMA and LSD that were common at the parties.

== Setting ==
Events and parties were often held in empty warehouses across the UK and were essentially illegal. The first acid house party in the world was in Bristol, 1986 organised by the Mekon Crew at a squat. There was also an acid house rave at the Rougham Tree Fair in 1986, which was part of the Green Deserts Fair. This is the first-ever acid house event at a festival. Some of the most famous party promoters included Energy, Biology, Genesis'88, Sunrise, and Weekend World. Emerging from Danny Rampling's London club Shoom in late 1987, parties grew in northern cities like Manchester (the Madchester scene) where warehouses had closed throughout the 1970s, and up to 10,000 people attended parties in smaller places such as Blackburn. Vague flyers around towns advertised events and information travelled by word of mouth (as well as the newly popular mobile pager) between clubbers who were obliged to party incognito. For most promoters, keeping entry cheap was a political issue - many of the early parties cost just £1 to enter and prices rarely crept above £3. If police turned up to shut down a party, some would open the doors and let everyone in for free.

Tommy Smith (a major organiser), had a disastrous one-year spell trying to promote the Hardcore Uproar parties in Blackburn, after the original organisers were jailed. He appeared with a defiant spirit on Granada TV show 'Up Front' hosted by Tony Wilson. During a debate with disgruntled Blackburn residents and Conservative MP Ken Hind—rather than try to put a pertinent point across, Smith declared that he was "not on drugs or alcohol, simply high on hope.."

== Music ==
The music was characterised by the "squelching" bass produced by the Roland TB-303 and loud repetitive beats. It originated in Chicago and took on new qualities when it came to Europe. Songs from the time period include "French Kiss" by Lil Louis "On & On" by Jesse Saunders, "Mystery of Love" by Fingers Inc., "Love Can't Turn Around" by Farley "Jackmaster" Funk & Jesse Saunders (featuring Darryl Pandy), "Back to Life (However Do You Want Me)" by Soul II Soul, "I've Lost Control" by Sleezy D, and "Your Only Friend" by Phuture.

The catchphrase of partygoers was ‘Can you feel it?’, alluding to the Royal House cry from "Can you Party?".

== Decline ==
The prevalence of drug use at these parties was in contrast to Thatcherism at the time, sparking moral panic. Police raided parties, such as a 10,000-strong rave in Nelson in 1990. In response, the Parliament of the United Kingdom passed the Entertainments (Increased Penalties) Act 1990 which brought the decline of acid house parties. As a result, the time period is often referred to as the Second Summer of Love. Eventually, acid house parties morphed into the rave scene.

== See also ==
- Acid house
- Second Summer of Love
