= You Can't Say That =

2011 book by Ken Livingstone

- Cover
- Author: Ken Livingstone
- Language: English
- Subjects: British politics Politics of London
- Published: London
- Publisher: Faber and Faber
- Publication date: 2011
- Publication place: United Kingdom
- Media type: Print (Hardcover and Paperback)
- ISBN: 978-0-571-28038-4
- Dewey Decimal: 941.085092

You Can't Say That is a 2011 political memoir by British politician Ken Livingstone, who served as Mayor of London (2000–8), leader of the Greater London Council (1981–86) and member of the House of Commons for Brent East (1987–2001).

== Background ==
Livingstone was identified on the hard-left of the Labour Party. He was a strong critic of New Labour, which sought to move the party to the centre. Livingstone is a critic of the Invasion of Iraq, is a republican, and identifies as a democratic socialist. He served as leader of the Greater London Council from 1981–1986, until the Council was abolished by the Thatcher Government. He sought nomination as Labour candidate for Mayor of London in 2000 but was not selected. He stood as a left-wing independent and was elected at the 2000 London mayoral election. He was subsequently allowed to rejoin Labour, and successfully contested the 2004 election. Livingstone was defeated in 2008 (and 2012) by the Conservative Boris Johnson.

== Reception ==
The memoir was praised by Seumas Milne in The Guardian. Milne wrote that Livingstone's left-wing politics had been vindicated. John Kampfner in The Observer was also positive and saw the book as being "honest, nuanced and picaresque." However, Andrew Gilligan, a long-time critic of Livingstone and an advisor to Boris Johnson, in the Daily Telegraph was strongly critical and rated the book as 1 out of 5 stars. The book was also reviewed by Sonia Purnell in The Independent and by Chris Mullin in the New Statesman.
