= I'm Not the Only One (book) =

Book by George Galloway

- Author: George Galloway
- Language: English
- Subject: British politics
- Published: London
- Publisher: Allen Lane
- Publication date: 2004
- Publication place: United Kingdom
- Media type: Print
- ISBN: 0713998075
- Dewey Decimal: 320.914

I'm Not the Only One is a 2004 political autobiography by the British politician George Galloway. The book details his political beginnings in the Labour Party in Glasgow, his opposition to the invasion of Iraq, support for the Palestinian cause and the founding of the Respect Party.

== Reception ==
Johann Hari in The Independent described the book as a "strange, repetitive little manifesto". The book was also criticised by Andrew Anthony in The Guardian who, apart from labelling Galloway an apologist for dictators, wrote that Galloway has an "enduring ability to believe in transparent fictions". Jim Horton in Socialism Today was more positive, but wrote that in I'm Not the Only One "there is hardly a scintilla of a socialist programme".
