= Power Trip: A Decade of Policy, Plots and Spin =

2013 memoir by Damian McBride

- Author: Damien McBride
- Language: English
- Published: 2013 (Biteback Publishing)
- Media type: Print (hardcover)
- Pages: 320 pp (first edition)
- ISBN: 978-1849545969

Power Trip: A Decade of Policy, Plots and Spin is a memoir by Damian McBride, former special advisor to Gordon Brown, between 1999 and 2009.
