= Sunrise & Back to the Future =

- Flyer for 1989 event promoted by Sunrise & Back to the Future
- Genre: Electronic music
- Years active: 1980s–1990s
- Founders: Tony Colston-Hayter and Paul Staines

Sunrise & Back to the Future were English acid house promoters who became one of the most successful organisers for large scale rave parties in the late 1980s and early 1990s.

== History ==
In the late 1980s, Tony Colston-Hayter teamed up with Roger Goodman, to organise a number of club nights masquerading as private parties with names such as Apocalypse Now. These parties would be promoted by Colston-Hayter by phoning up ITN and asking them to do an "...And Finally" report about this new youth culture scene (acid house) on the ITV News. However by the time Colston-Hayter had invited another ITV news team down to promote his latest party late in 1988 (this time from Granada's current affairs show World in Action) acid house was being described as a "sinister and evil cult" that was just encouraging people to take drugs. At that point the scene moved from acid house parties in the centre of London, to raves around the M25 orbital motorway, with Colston-Hayter teaming up with Paul Staines to create Sunrise.

Run by Colston-Hayter and Staines, the organisation was occasionally front-page news. In 1989, Colston-Hayter evaded imprisonment for organising an unlicensed party (Sunrise: A Midsummer Night's Dream at White Waltham Airfield aka "Ecstasy Airport") by claiming that he issued membership cards for Sunrise and it was a private party. Shortly afterwards, on 8 July, he appeared in an After Dark television programme about gambling, alongside Victor Lownes and Al Alvarez among others, and on 19 November 1989 appeared on the One Hour with Jonathan Ross chat show. On this show he appeared alongside Siouxsie Sioux and ZTT co-founder/creative Paul Morley, a journalist who had suspicions that Colston-Hayter did not care for the culture, and was just out to monetise the scene. As during the interview Colston-Hayter threw a glass of water over Morley before handcuffing himself to the host, the footage has turned up in many 21st Century clip shows, such as the Channel 5 programme When TV Guests Go Horribly Wrong.

In 2014, Colston-Hayter was imprisoned for hacking several banks in London. In 2018, after release from his previous sentence, he was convicted of further fraudulent activities and sentenced to 20 months.

Sunrise along with Weekend World were instrumental in organising the Freedom to Party demonstrations and the free parties that followed alongside Biology, Energy and Genesis.

== See also ==
- List of electronic music festivals
- Raindance
