= Paul Staines =

British right-wing political blogger (born 1967)

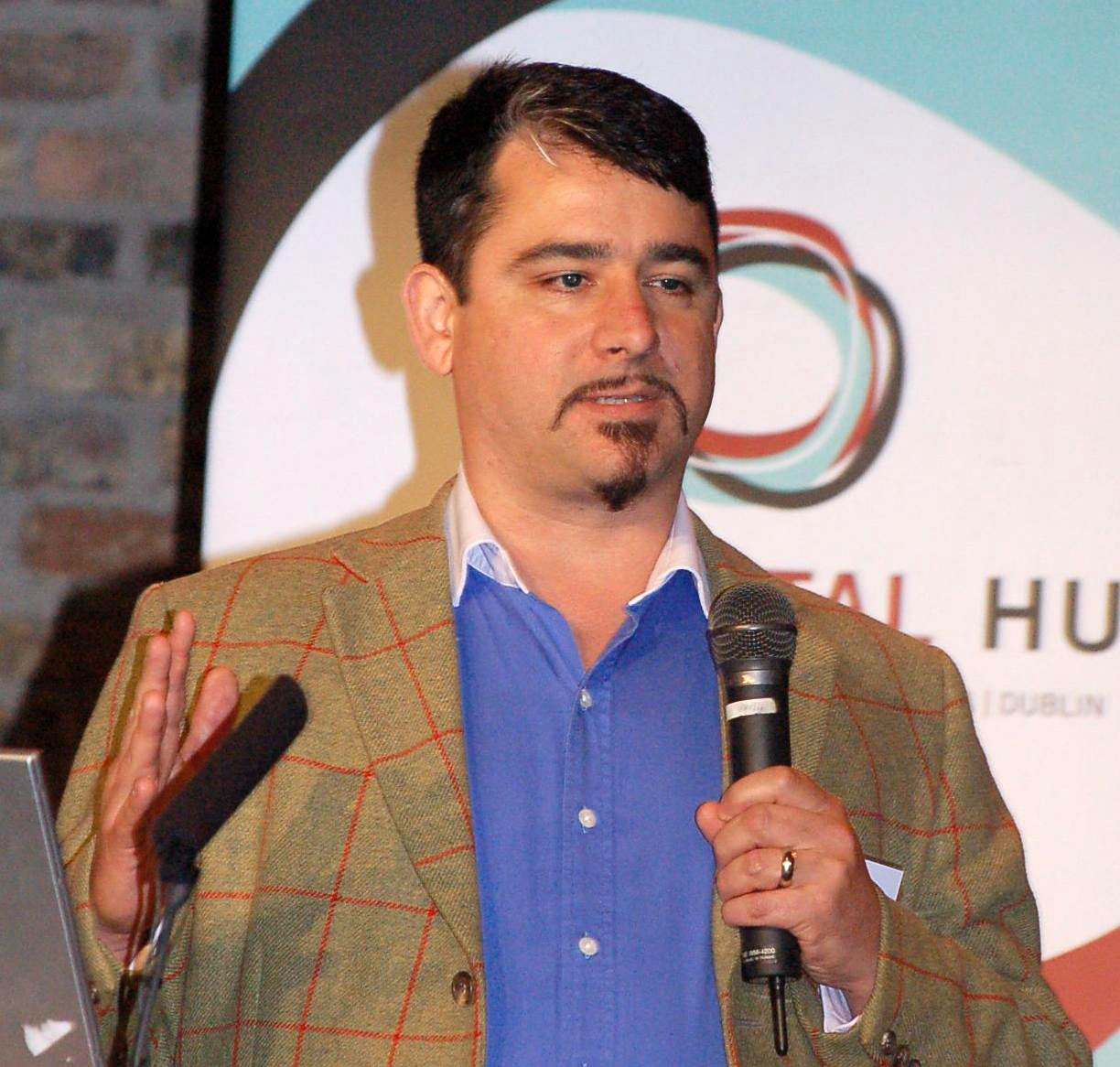
- Staines in 2006
- Born: Paul De Laire Staines; 11 February 1967 (age 59); Ealing, London, England
- Education: Humberside College of FE
- Occupation: Political blogger
- Known for: Guido Fawkes
- Political party: formerly associated with: Conservative Party; Social Democratic Party (UK); Progressive Democrats

Paul De Laire Staines (born 11 February 1967) is a British-Irish right-wing political blogger who publishes the Guido Fawkes website, which was described by The Daily Telegraph as "one of Britain's leading political blogsites" in 2007. The Sun on Sunday newspaper published a weekly Guido Fawkes column from 2013 to 2016. Born and raised in England, Staines holds British and Irish citizenship.

Staines acquired an interest in politics as a libertarian in the 1980s and undertook public relations for acid house parties in the early 1990s. He then spent several years in finance, first as a broker then as a trader. In 2001, he sued his fund's financial backer in a commercial dispute. Consequently, Staines declared himself bankrupt in October 2003 after two years of litigation, and legal costs on both sides running into hundreds of thousands of pounds.

In September 2004, Staines started publishing his political blog Guido Fawkes. The blog was named after the Spanish name for Guy Fawkes, an English Catholic involved in the failed Gunpowder Plot to assassinate King James I in 1605.

== Early life ==
Paul De Laire Staines was born in Ealing, London, to Irish-born Mary (née Cronin) and Indian-born Terril De Laire Staines. Staines' father was a Fabian who went to work for John Lewis because it was a cooperative; he is from Jhansi, Uttar Pradesh. Staines' mother is from a working-class background and grew up in Finglas, Dublin.

Staines grew up in Sudbury, London. Raised a Catholic, he attended Salvatorian College Catholic grammar school in Harrow. Subsequently, he read business information studies at the Humberside College of Higher Education, but did not complete the course. While a student there Staines wrote to an organiser of the British National Party proposing joint "direct action" to disrupt the meetings of leftwing students.

He was a member of the Social Democratic Party, sitting on the national executive of its youth wing, and the Conservative Party. Whilst studying at college in Hull in the 1980s, he was a member of the Federation of Conservative Students.

Staines lives in Ireland and was a member of the now defunct Irish political party, the Progressive Democrats.

== Politics ==
Staines is a libertarian who described in a 2000 publication how he became a libertarian in 1980 after reading Karl Popper's The Open Society and its Enemies. He joined the Young Conservatives whilst at Humberside College of Higher Education, "because they were the only people around who were anti-Socialist or at least anti-Soviet". Having joined the Federation of Conservative Students, he described his politics as "Thatcher on drugs". He relates that at college he was a "right-wing pain in the butt who was more interested in student politics than essays", who went on "to work in the various right-wing pressure groups and think tanks that proliferated in the late eighties". He once said, "I never wore a 'Hang Mandela' badge, but I hung out with people who did".

Staines was active in the Libertarian Alliance. He was pictured at the 1987 Libertarian Alliance conference with a T-shirt supporting UNITA, produced by his Popular Propaganda enterprise (while at college), which produced posters and T-shirts. Staines worked as "foreign policy analyst" for the Committee for a Free Britain, a right-wing Conservative pressure group, alongside David Hart. Staines acted as editor of British Briefing, a long-standing publication by the group that was a "monthly intelligence analysis of the activities of the extreme left" that sought to "smear Labour MPs and left-leaning lawyers and writers".

Staines relates of his work with the committee:

I was lobbying at the Council of Europe and at Parliament; I was over in Washington, in Jo'burg, in South America. It was 'let's get guns for the Contras', that sort of stuff. I was enjoying it immensely, I got to go with these guys and fire off AK-47s. I always like to go where the action is, and for that period in the Reagan/Thatcher days, it was great fun, it was all expenses paid and I got to see the world. I used to think that World Briefing was a bit funny. The only scary thing about those publications was the mailing list – people like George Bush – and the fact that Hart would talk to the head of British Intelligence for an hour. I used to think it was us having a laugh, putting some loony right-wing sell in, and that somebody somewhere was taking it seriously. You've got to understand that we had a sense of humour about this.

In 1989, Staines published In the Grip of the Sandinistas: Human Rights in Nicaragua 1979–1989, under the auspices of the International Society for Human Rights (of which he was UK secretary-general), analysing the Sandinistas in Nicaragua from 1979 to 1989. He was then the editor of a series of papers called the Human Rights Defenders Briefing Papers.

In August 2011, Staines —who writes the political blog Guido Fawkes and heads the Restore Justice Campaign—launched an e-petition on the Downing Street website calling for the restoration of the death penalty for those convicted of the murder of children and police officers. The petition was one of several in support or opposition of capital punishment to be published by the government with the launch of its e-petitions website. Petitions attracting 100,000 signatures would prompt a parliamentary debate on a particular topic, but not necessarily lead to any Parliamentary Bills being put forward. When the petition closed on 4 February 2012 it had received 26,351 signatures in support of restoring capital punishment.

Staines described his political journey in an interview in 2013, "I was "anarcho-capitalist, [then] libertarian, then pragmatic libertarian." He went on to say his ideology was now closer to the Conservatives and UKIP. He supports Brexit. In 2023, the New Statesman named Staines the 39th most powerful right-wing British political figure of the year.

== Guido Fawkes ==
In September 2004, Staines began writing an anonymous blog about British politics under the name of Guido Fawkes, an alternative name of Guy Fawkes, one of the group that plotted to blow up the Palace of Westminster in the Gunpowder Plot of 1605. In February 2005, The Guardian reported that the Fawkes blog shared a fax number with Staines. Although he subsequently refused to confirm the links, further media coverage continued to name Staines as Fawkes until the airing of a BBC Radio 4 documentary about him on 10 February 2007, which gave a detailed history and background, and prompted his blog post "So Much for Anonymity".

In 2005, Guido was voted the best in the Political Commentary category of The Backbencher Political Weblog Awards, run by The Guardian. It was not a survey of Guardian readers explicitly, but instead an internet poll linked to the Guido Fawkes website. In May 2006, Staines (as Guido Fawkes) co-authored a book with Iain Dale, which was critical of the Labour Party's practices since taking office in 1997.

In April 2006, Staines was one of numerous bloggers subject to an injunction from News International for publishing a picture of the undercover journalist Mazher Mahmood. Staines agreed to publish the photo if 10 other bloggers would do so. The picture remained on Guido, and, following legal action from George Galloway, was subsequently released into the public domain.

Guido reported the allegation that Deputy Prime Minister John Prescott was having an extramarital affair with an MP. It also named the woman in question, saying that such rumours had long been shared among Westminster journalists, but that the blog was being less hypocritical and breaking the clique by refusing to cover up such stories. The coverage of the Prescott affair drew considerable extra traffic to Staines's blog.

He was named at number 36 in the "Top 50 newsmakers of 2006" in The Independent, for his blog, and his role in the Prescott scandal in particular. In 2011 GQ ranked him, alongside co-author Harry Cole, jointly at number 28 in the magazine's list of the 100 Most Influential Men in Britain.

Staines encourages readers to forward political documents and information, which he publishes on his blog. One such leak was a strategy document for the Peter Hain for Deputy Leader of the Labour Party campaign. This leak caused embarrassment to Hain's campaign as it included information on MPs who had not gone public with their support, as well as others who were supposed to be independent.

"Tottywatch" is an irregular feature that comprises pictures of attendees at political events. Although the pictures are of both men and women, the majority are of attractive young women. Staines' wife is referred to as Mrs Fawkes and his daughters as Miss Fawkes and Ms Fawkes. On Monday mornings, the blog features a Monday Morning Point of View cartoon by "Rich&Mark", cartoonist Rich Johnston, archived at the RichAndMark website.

In 2012, RTÉ Radio 1 broadcast a documentary about Staines, Our Man in Westminster, as part of its Documentary on One series.

Vote Leave employee Tom Harwood was hired as a Guido reporter in July 2018; he left in 2021 to join GB News.

Staines has said that Steve Bannon, a former senior adviser to Donald Trump and head of Breitbart News, once tried to buy Guido. "That fell through over price," Staines told Press Gazette. "I never could work out whether we were talking dollars or sterling".

In November 2024, after celebrating the twentieth anniversary of Guido Fawkes, Staines announced he would be standing down as editor, with Ross Kempsell being confirmed as taking over the role.

== Business interests ==
In 2006, Staines, along with Jag Singh, co-founded MessageSpace, a digital advertising agency which operates an advertising network representing dozens of leading political websites. In 2012, it advised the successful Boris Johnson London mayoral campaign.

Global & General Nominees Limited (GGN) publishes the Guido Fawkes website, and is based in the tax haven of Saint Kitts and Nevis. Staines describes himself as an "adviser" to GGN, and stated that the company is based in Saint Kitts and Nevis as a "litigation shield".

== Personal life ==
Staines is married to Orla, a solicitor who works for an investment bank in the City of London. They have two daughters. Staines and his family also hold Irish citizenship.

Staines has four alcohol-related convictions. In 2002, he was banned from driving for 12 months for drink driving. When he was convicted of the same offence six years later, he was asked in court by District Judge Timothy Stone whether he had an alcohol problem and replied: "Possibly." He was banned from driving for three years, as well as being given an 18-month supervision order and instructed to wear an electronic tag for three months.
