= List of electronic music festivals =

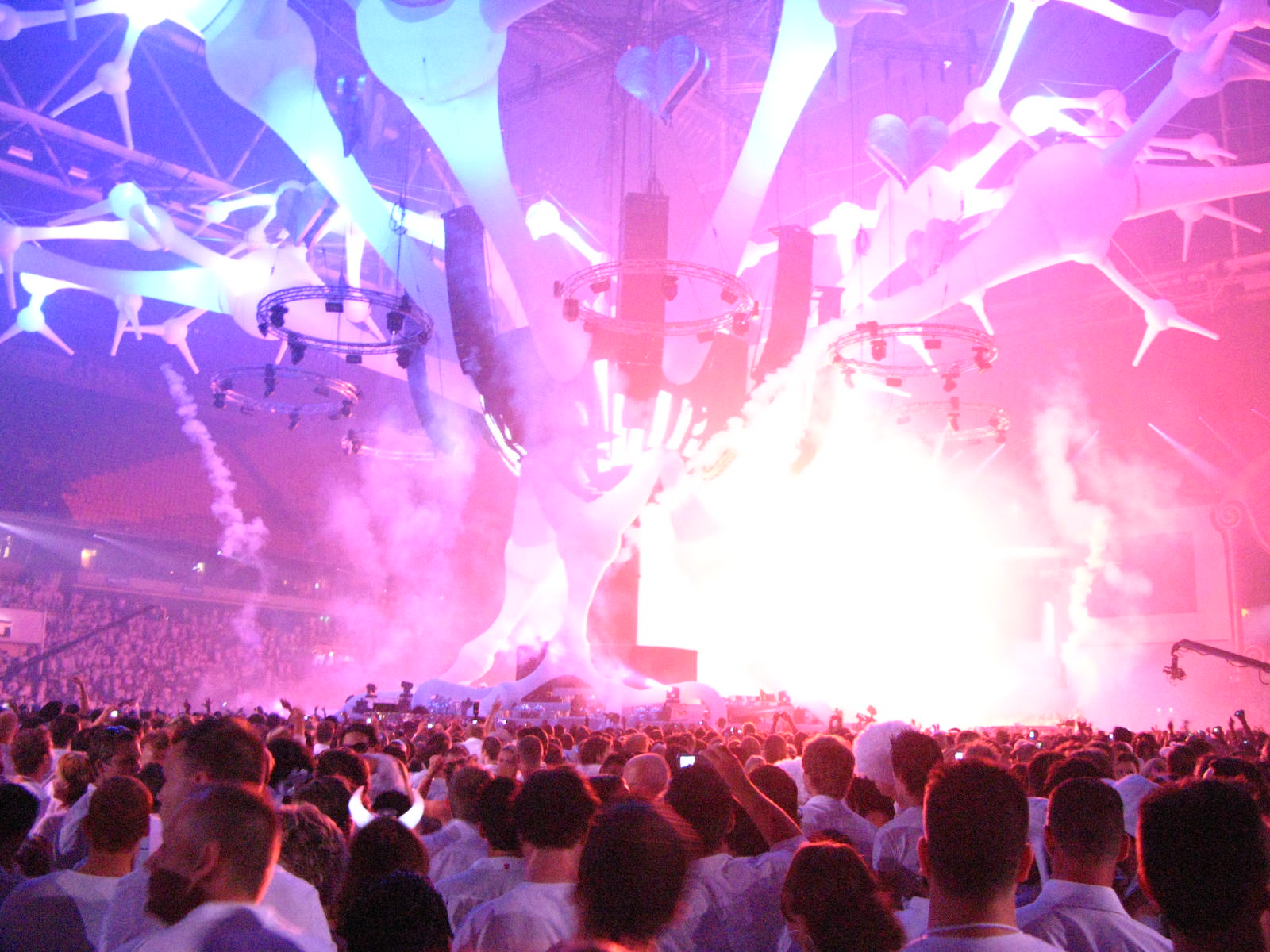

General Information
- Related genres: Electronic music, house music, electronic rock, synthpop, techno, electroacoustic music, industrial, drum and bass, ambient music, etc.
- Location: Worldwide

The following is an incomplete list of music festivals that feature electronic music, which encapsulates music featuring electronic instruments such as electric guitars and keyboards, as well as recent genres such as electronic dance music (EDM). Many of the festivals in this list take place in the United States and Europe, though every year thousands of electronic-focused music festivals are held throughout the world. This list generally excludes multi-genre festivals with only a partial focus on electronic music (Glastonbury, Summer Sonic Festival, and Big Day Out) and festivals that have added EDM stages in later years.

Since the early 1900s there have been music festivals that featured electronic instruments, as electronic sounds were used in experimental music such as electroacoustic and tape music. The use of live electronic music greatly expanded in the 1950s, along with the use of electric guitar and bass. With the advent of new technologies in the 1960s, electronic genres such as electronic rock, electronic jazz, disco, computer music, synthpop, psychedelic rock and ambient music followed, with large free festivals showcasing the sounds into the 1970s. There has been a significant change in the capabilities of amplifiers, sequencers, and mixing synthesizers since 1980, as well as computers and digital audio workstations. This has given electronic musicians and DJs the ability to mix elaborate and complicated music in forms such as techno, electronica, trance, house or industrial, all of which have large festivals, raves, technoparades, algoraves, doofs, or teknivals in their sole dedication.

== Festivals by debut year ==
=== 1800s–1950s: Electroacoustics ===
Name	Yrs	Locale	Notes
Early Folk and Classical Music Festivals	1800s–1920s	Worldwide	A number of festivals for classical music and folk music in the late 1800s and early 1900s periodically featured electronic instruments and electroacoustic improvisation, though they were not necessarily a regular feature. Some of these festivals included Leeds Festival (1858–1985) in England, the folk festival Þjóðhátíð (1874–present) in Iceland, and Glastonbury (1914–25) in England.
Donaueschingen Festival	1921– present	Donaueschingen, Germany	A vital party of the history of electronic music, this festival paved the way to the concept of establishing small festivals to present new and experimental musicians. After World War I, a significant increase in new electronic instruments took place, becoming featured elements of the festival. In 1926, Jorg Mager invented an electronic instrument without a keyboard, called the Spharophon, among others, which was shown at the festival.
Beaulieu Jazz Festival	1956–1961	Hampshire, England	Lord Montagu of Beaulieu holds an annual trad and modern jazz festival in the ground of Beaulieu estate, in the New Forest. Attracts beats and jazz eccentrics, called 'ravers'.
ONCE Festival of New Music	1958–1969	Ann Arbor, Michigan	ONCE Group was responsible for hosting. During the years the festival was active, a number of avant-garde composers’ works were performed, including Pauline Oliveros, David Behrman, Roger Reynolds, Gene Tyranny, and Philip Krumm. The compositions and the performances served as a laboratory for new approaches in both acoustic and electronic music.
Pro Musica Nova	1958–2001	Bremen, Germany	Was a biennial festival for contemporary music sponsored by Radio Bremen from 1958 to 2001. It was founded by Hans Otte. Pro Musica Nova introduced the public to the music of experimental composers including Karlheinz Stockhausen, John Cage, Mauricio Kagel, György Ligeti, Terry Riley, La Monte Young, Conlon Nancarrow and Hans-Joachim Hespos. Otte also commissioned many new works for the festival.

=== 1960s: Rock and pop festivals ===
Name	Year	Location	Notes
National Jazz and Blues Festival	1961–1980s	United Kingdom	Mostly oriented around jazz and blues to start, this annual festival soon became a showcase for progressive rock as well, featuring groups such as the psychedelic rock group Cream.
Reading and Leeds Festivals	1961–present	United Kingdom	The line-up settled into a pattern of progressive rock, blues and hard rock during the early and mid 1970s then became the first music festival to embrace punk rock and new wave in the late 1970s, when The Jam, Sham 69, The Stranglers and Penetration were among the headline acts. Currently known for its rock focus, it also hosts major EDM stages for DJs.
Un disco per l'estate	1964–2003	Italy	It was organized and sponsored by the Italian record industry association, AFI, and by RAI, except for the editions between 1995 and 2000, in which the festival was organized and broadcast by Mediaset.
Trips Festival	1966	San Francisco	The Trips Festival on 21–23 January 1966 was the most attended and advertised of the early Acid Tests events, which were started in late 1965. On Saturday 22 January, the Grateful Dead and Big Brother and the Holding Company came on stage, and 6,000 people arrived to imbibe punch spiked with LSD and to witness one of the first fully developed light shows of the era.
Shiraz Arts Festival	1967–1977	Shiraz and Persepolis, Iran	An experimental international festival, a number of electroacoustic works were presented during its run, with artists such as Dave Tudor and John Cage performing in 1971.
Summer of Love	1967–1968	North America	The Summer of Love from 1967 to 1968 was an important aspect of the counterculture movement of the 1960s, which was closely tied with alternative music and free rock festivals featuring genres such as psychedelic rock. The development of better electronic speaker equipment allowed for massive concerts to attract hundreds of thousands of attendees. Started with the Fantasy Fair and Magic Mountain Music Festival in Marin County, California, the other significant shows in California included the Monterey Pop Festival, the San Francisco Pop Festival, the Los Angeles Pop Festival, Newport Pop Festival, and Northern California Folk Rock Festival I and II. Notable shows not in California included the Miami Pop Festival I and II in Florida, and the Isle of Wight Festival in England. By 1969, similar festivals were appearing all over the world, bringing alternative music to increasingly mainstream audiences.
Isle of Wight Festival	1968–1970, 2002–present	Seaclose Park, England	The Isle of Wight Festival is a music festival which takes place annually on the Isle of Wight in England. It was originally a counterculture event held from 1968 to 1970. The 1970 event was by far the largest and most famous of these early festivals and the unexpectedly high attendance levels with estimates of over 600,000 led, in 1971, to Parliament passing the "Isle of Wight Act" preventing gatherings of more than 5,000 people on the island without a special license.
Woodstock Music & Art Fair	1969	White Lake, New York	This historically and culturally notable festival is known to have served as a defining moment for baby boomers. Performers included Joe Cocker, Jimi Hendrix and Santana among many others, with genres such as acoustic music, folk music, and psychedelic rock. From 15 to 18 August, Woodstock had an audience of over 400,000 young people.

=== 1970s: Computer music ===
Name	Year	Location	Notes	Picture
Bath Festival of Blues and Progressive Music	1970	Shepton Mallet, England	A DJ played records for early arrivals starting Friday evening, and continued to do so between many of the sets until the end. The festival featured a line-up of the top American west coast and British bands of the day, including Santana, The Flock, Led Zeppelin (headlining act), Pink Floyd, etc.	
Expo '70	1970	Osaka, Japan	The first World's Fair held in Japan, which featured a number of electronic music exhibits. The West German pavilion, designed by Fritz Bornemann, featured the world's first spherical concert hall. Inside, the audience was surrounded by 50 loudspeaker groups at different "latitudes" while classical music was played from multi-track tape. Also in the course of the exhibition, often experimental performers gave concerts for over a million visitors. Early Japanese computer music compositions include a piece by Kenjiro Ezaki presented during Osaka Expo '70. Since then, Japanese research in computer music has largely been carried out for commercial purposes in popular music.	
Bourges International Electroacoustic Music Festival	1972–present	Bourges, France	Hosted by the Institut International de Musique Electroacoustique de Bourges in France. Composers submit works which are assessed by an international jury.	
Windsor Free Festival	1972–1974	Windsor Great Park, England	A British free festival organised by some London commune dwellers, notably Ubi Dwyer and Sid Rawle. The event was brutally suppressed by the police, which led to a public outcry about the tactics involved. In 1975, both Ubi Dwyer and Sid Rawle were imprisoned for attempting to promote a 1975 Windsor Festival.	
International Computer Music Conference	1974–present	Various	A yearly international conference for computer music researchers and composers. It is the annual conference of the International Computer Music Association (ICMA).	
Printemps de Bourges	1977–present	Bourges, France	A festival encompassing some 60 shows, with over 200 artists on 13 stages within a week. The shows represent diverse genres, often experimental and electronic. The ever-growing public is composed primarily of young people (91% are under 35), and over 200,000 people attend the festival each year.	

=== 1980s: Birth of techno ===
Name	Year	Locale	Notes	Picture
Heatwave	1980	Bowmanville, Ontario	The rock festival was noteworthy because of the importance of the headliner bands that played, the timing in the evolution of new wave music, and from the size of the crowd.	
International Electroacoustic Music Festival	1981–present	Varadero, Cuba, and United States	Originally titled the "Varadero Spring Festival," the festival was renamed in 1998. It has featured electroacoustic musicians such as Julio Roloff. Juan Blanco created it with the purpose of presenting Cuban composer's electroacoustic and avant-garde works to an international audience, and to establish relationships with foreign composers and artists. It is still held in various locations. It was held in 1988 in Baltimore, Maryland, by Vivian Adelberg Rudow.	
Berlin Atonal	1982–1990, 2013–present	Berlin	Originally held at SO36 in Kreuzberg, the early years of Atonal fostered revolutionary and innovative musical acts such as Psychic TV, Einstürzende Neubauten, Test Dept, 808 State, and Die Haut, among many others. Throughout the 1980s, Berlin Atonal was at the vanguard of the progressive electronic and experimental music and art scenes in Berlin. The festival closed in 1990. In 2013, Berlin Atonal was at a massive abandoned powerplant in Berlin-Mitte.	
Inventionen Festival	1982–present	Berlin	Organised by the Artists-in-Berlin-Program of the DAAD, in cooperation with the Electronic Studio of the TU Berlin since 1982, the festival is dedicated to electro-acoustic music and sound art.	
Rat Parties	1983–1992	Sydney	A series of large dance parties held in Sydney, Australia that "formed a key element of an emerging subculture" that was fashion-aware, gay-friendly, and that appreciated dance music and open, outrageous celebration. Forty Rat Parties were organized by the Recreational Arts Team between 1983 and 1992.	
Winter Music Conference	1985–present	Miami Beach, Florida	A week-long electronic music event, held every March in various clubs in Miami. It is aimed at professionals such as DJs, record label representatives and promoters. The event is also considered a mecca for clubbers, and it features the International Dance Music Awards.	
DMC World DJ Championships	1985–present	Thessaloniki, Greece	Sponsored internationally by Technics and Ortofon, the event has grown over the years and the formats of its competitions have developed along with demand. Originally intended to be a DJ mixing battle, DJ Cheese introduced scratching in his routine in 1986, changing the course of future DMC battles.	
White Party Miami	1985–present	Miami	One of the first White Parties held by the gay community as a circuit party, the first event promoted safe sex practices, and all attendees wore white. Sixteen hundred guests showed up that Sunday night, 1 December 1985. Each paid $10, which went to support AIDS nonprofits. Now a week-long event, most of the parties are geared to gay men from all over the globe, but there are several events for lesbians and mixed crowds as well.	
SEAMUS National Conference	1985–present	United States	Put on by the American branch of the Society for Electro-Acoustic Music in the United States since 1985. In 1987, the society began giving the SEAMUS Lifetime Achievement Award to acknowledge people who have made significant contributions to electro-acoustic music. The award is presented at the SEAMUS National Conference, which is held annually.	
Wave-Gotik-Treffen	1987–present	Leipzig, Germany	Annual festival is the largest gothic festival on this planet. Every year, hundreds of artists and bands from various genres perform at different venues throughout the city over a span of four days.	
Shelley's Laserdome	late 1980s	Staffordshire, England	A nightclub at the heart of the house and rave scene of the late 1980s and early 90s that helped launch the career of Sasha and that featured regular appearances from Carl Cox, until it was eventually shut down by the Staffordshire Police. The club's heyday was c. 1990.	
Energy	1988–1992	England	Energy raves organised by Quentin 'TinTin' Chambers and Jeremy Taylor set the standard for electronic music events, with high value production incorporating a film set designer and state-of-the-art sound and lighting. Energy's 'Live Dance Concept' in 1990 at London's Docklands Arena was the first true fusion of live dance acts and large production, featuring the likes of 808 State, Adamski, Snap and William Orbit.	
Sunrise	1988	England	Huge outdoor Sunrise raves organised by Tony Colston-Hayter and Paul Staines. Sunrise were instrumental in organising the Freedom to Party demonstrations and the free parties that followed alongside Genesis '88, Biology and Weekend World.	
Genesis '88	1988–1992	England	Genesis '88 was a party promotion crew founded during 1988 during the UK's discovery of acid house and illegal acid house parties. Genesis enjoyed a succession of events that saw attendances rise from 300 to 15,000 people. However, Genesis were targeted by the UK government and the criminal underworld after the media wrote of huge profits (£500,000) being made by such promoters. The Genesis organisers were kidnapped and extorted by gangsters for protection money, which happened to other promoters as well. This, coupled with the government's label of "Public Enemy No.1", helped bring about the end of illegal acid house parties.	
Raindance	1989–present	United Kingdom	One of the best known rave names on the UK rave scene in the late 1980s and early 1990s. The first event was held at a circus tent on 16 September 1989 at Jenkins Lane, Beckton in east London. This was Britain's first legal all-night rave. DJs such as Carl Cox, Dave Angel, LTJ Bukem, Mr C, DJ Rap, John Digweed, Kevin "Reece" Saunderson, Slipmatt (where he and partner John "Lime" Fernandez would create SL2 during this event in 1989), Fabio and Grooverider started out at Raindance.	
Helter Skelter	1989	England	The Helter Skelter organization was founded in September 1989, in the midst of the Acid House party era, by David Pratley and his wife Penny. They were inspired by the early Acid Bungalow clubs such as "Codys" and "Lava", and the M25 motorway "Orbital" rave events such as the Sunrise. Helter Skelter's first event was an illegal outdoor rave in 1989.	
Love Parade	1989–2010	Germany; other nations	A popular festival and parade that originated in Berlin in 1989, and spread throughout the world. The last Love Parade was held in the City of Duisburg on 24 July 2010. After a number of deaths at the concert, the annual rendition was cancelled.	
Real Bad	1989–present	San Francisco	The name of a fundraising party held annually in San Francisco, California, immediately following the Folsom Street Fair.	
Computer Space forum	1989–present	Bulgaria	International computer art festival in Sofia started as a festival for electronic music. One of the modern sections of the contest and festival part is still related to computer and electronic music.	

=== 1990s: Genre proliferation ===
==== 1990–1994 ====
Name	Year	Location	Notes	Picture
Black and Blue Festival	1991–present	Montreal, Quebec	The world's largest gay-benefit dance festival, attracting thousands of tourists to Montreal every Canadian Thanksgiving weekend, which raises money for HIV/AIDS and the gay community. It is organized annually by the Bad Boy Club Montréal (also called the BBCM and Fondation BBCM). The various events attract up to 70,000 participants a year.	
Mayday	1991–present	Germany	One of the oldest electronic music festivals in Germany, artists such as Yello, Spoon, Sven Väth, Moby and Marusha have performed. Although they were pioneers as leaders of techno music in Central Europe in their early days, in recent years Mayday has opened up to new sounds, from hardstyle to house, trance and EDM. There have been editions in other countries like Poland, where it takes place every year, or Hungary.	
A*Devantgarde	1991–present	Munich, Germany	A•DEvantgarde is a music festival held every 2 years. The A•DEvantgarde Festival was formed in the late 1980s by a passionate group of young German composers who wanted to break from the traditional Darmstadt school of serial composition.	
Fantazia	1991–1993, 1997	England	Fantazia is a dance organization that first held six large raves in 1992. Earlier, A Fantazia New Year event was held 1991–1992 at Westpoint Exhibition Centre with 10,000 people. These events were legal, and Fantazia's rave at Castle Donington was the largest outdoor rave to be held in the UK, with no fewer than 25,000 people. Fantazia raves increasingly featured characteristics of theme parks and mainstream celebrations.	
Club Skirts Dinah Shore Weekend	1991–present	Palm Springs, California	Dubbed "The Dinah", the five-day festival is considered the largest lesbian event in the United States and the world. The first unofficial Dinah Shore Weekend took place in 1986 when women began to flock to Palm Springs in conjunction with a golf tournament, and has since grown to include a White Party.	
Kazantip	1992–2014	Crimea, Ukraine	The longest running and the largest electronic music festival in the former Soviet Union. Originally held in a reactor building on the Crimea Peninsula, the week-long event purports to be a "free music republic". In 2014, the festival took place outside of Crimea for the first time ever, in Anaklia, Georgia. In 2015, it was to be held on Cambodia but was cancelled by the local authorities.	
Earthcore	1992–2017	Australia	An Australian outdoor dance music festival and electronic music events organisation. The outdoor events were generally held in forest environments around Victoria, Australia, with some events held in Queensland and overseas in New Caledonia. After the last remaining founder died in 2018, the event has ceased.	
Street Parade	1992–present	Zurich, Switzerland	The most attended "technoparade" in Europe, attracting 900,000 in 2011. Inspired by the Berlin Love Parade, originally a demonstration of love, peace, freedom, generosity and tolerance with 2000 ravers dancing through Berlin behind two Lovemobiles.	
Energy	1992–2013	Zurich, Switzerland	An electronic music event taking place after the Street Parade in Zurich, Switzerland. It is considered the largest indoor event of its nature in the country. In 2010, around 14,000 people attended.	
Thunderdome	1992–2012, 2017–present	Netherlands	Thunderdome is a famous concept in hardcore techno and gabber music organized by the Dutch entertainment company ID&T. The first big event was The Final Exam, with more than 10,000 people in attendance on 20 June 1992. From 1992 to 2012 it operated Thunderdome as a festival. After the 2012 event, the party was brought back in 2017 for the 25th anniversary. There has been editions in other countries too.	
Castlemorton Common Festival	1992	Malvern, England	Weeklong free tekno informal concert. An estimated 20,000–40,000 people gathered on Castlemorton Common to hold a free party that lasted a full week, the biggest of its kind since the Stonehenge Free Festival in the mid-1980s. Castlemorton hosted many of the large sound systems of the time such as Bedlam, Circus Warp, Spiral Tribe and the DiY Sound System, and bands such as Back To The Planet. A great deal of media interest surrounded the festival. Concerns about the festival and the way in which it was policed inspired the legislation which developed into the Criminal Justice and Public Order Act 1994. This wide-ranging Act effectively made illegal such outdoor parties that played music in England, which was defined in section 63(1)(b) to include "sounds wholly or predominantly characterized by the emission of a succession of repetitive beats".	
Sziget Festival	1993–present	Budapest, Hungary	One of the largest music and cultural festivals in Europe. It is held every August in northern Budapest, Hungary, on Óbudai-sziget ('Old Buda Island'), a leafy 108 hectares (270 acres) island on the Danube. More than 1,000 performances take place each year.	
Every Picture Tells A Story	1993–2013	Melbourne, Australia	The Melbourne Underground Development (M.U.D.) crew started a series of warehouse/rave parties that continued for almost 10 years, with 21 of their own Every Picture Tells A Story parties in total, drawing thousands of people to each event.	
Tribal Gathering	1993–2006	England	First Tribal Gathering took place at Lower Pertwood Farm, Warminster, Wiltshire, England. 25,000 people attended to see acts as diverse as Laurent Garnier and Pete Tong.	
Mysteryland	1993–present	Netherlands	An annual festival operated by Dutch company ID&T. As the first of its kind in the country when it was established, its organizers have billed the event as the oldest dance music festival in the Netherlands. There have been editions in other countries too, like Chile or the United States.	
Time Warp	1994–present	Germany	Time Warp is a techno music festival in Germany. The premiere was in 1994 in Ludwigshafen. Since 2000, Mannheim has been the permanent venue. Since 2005 also stopped over in European and American cities such as Vienna, Prague, Zurich, Turin, Milan, Buenos Aires and New York City.	
CzechTek	1994–2006	Czech Republic	An underground teknival held annually in July. The locations were usually announced a day before the event on Czech rave websites. With little or no organization at all, the festival attracted thousands of free tekno dancers from several European countries. It made an open invitation to all performers, soundsystems, and performers. Closed after a violent police response in 2006.	
Whitby Goth Weekend	1994–present	Whitby, England	Twice-yearly goth festival, also including genres such as EBM and industrial.	
World's Largest Disco	1994–present	Buffalo, New York	The event, widely popular in the area, is a tribute to the disco era and features live performances by 1970s-era musicians, along with dancers dressed in 1970s attire. The current event began as an annual occurrence in 1994, but it traces its history and name to a disco held in Buffalo in 1979, featuring The Trammps and Gloria Gaynor. That disco is marked in Guinness World Records as the largest disco in the history, with 13,000 people in attendance.	
Sónar	1994–present	Barcelona	A three-day, three-night annual music festival, described officially as a festival of "Advanced Music and Multimedia Art". Lineup includes techno, house, electro, IDM, hip hop and various other experimental and avant garde types of music.	
Sonic Acts	1994–present	Netherlands	The Sonic Acts festival had its first edition in 1994. Over the years, it has established itself as a thematic festival with a strong focus on contemporary and historical developments at the intersections of art, technology, music and science taking place in Amsterdam, Netherlands.	

==== 1995–1997 ====
Name	Year	Location	Notes	Picture
Olympia Experimental Music Festival	1995–present	Olympia, Washington	Known first as The Olympia Festival of Experimental Musics, in addition to unusual, experimental, and noise music, many festival performers use film, multimedia, and spoken word.	
Dance Valley	1995–present	Spaarnwoude, Netherlands	Annual summer dance music festival dubbed "the Woodstock of dance", catering only to pure dance and particularly trance. It has also featured artists in the electro, eurodance, hardstyle and experimental styles. The festival pushed its boundaries with several international editions, including in Miami, Ibiza, Malta and Israel.	
Bal en Blanc	1995–present	Montreal, Quebec	It now features headliner DJs from all over the world and attracts over 15,000 attendees. Bal en Blanc usually has two separate rooms, one catering to house music and the other to trance music.	
Nature One	1995– present	Germany	A large open-air electronic music festival, featuring DJs from Germany and the world, with the theme "open-air rave". The first Nature One took place in 1995 on the grounds of Frankfurt-Hahn Airport. The following year, Nature One was relocated to the site of the former Pydna missile base, where it still takes place today.	
Nocturnal Wonderland	1995–present	United States	Massive electronic music festival originally based on Alice in Wonderland. In its early years, Insomniac Events moved the event to different locations, with diverse musical genres.	
I Love Techno	1995–present	Ghent, Belgium; since 2015, Montpellier, France	An international techno event. It took place the first time in 1995 at the Vooruit in Ghent and attracted 700 people, and had since grown to be held at the Flanders Expo in the same city. Many spin-off versions of the festival have been held over the years across Europe. Between 2011 and 2013, the festival was also organized in Montpellier. In 2015, it was announced that the main festival would relocate to Montpellier, France, as crowds had shrunk. Former I Love Techno organiser Peter Decuypere partly blamed the shrinking crowds on the festival embracing genres like dubstep and electro house.	
Enit Festival	1995	United States	A one-night electronic music festival originally created as an after party for Lollapalooza, described as "an inter-planetary festival celebrating cosmic peace and sexuality". A traveling tour that visited cities such as Dallas, San Francisco, Los Angeles, Phoenix and Holmdel.	
Union Move	1995–2001	Munich, Germany	Annual technoparade in Munich, attracting up to 100,000 attendees. It was organized as a demonstration against excessive police controls and the Munich curfew.	
Generation Move	1995– 2007	Hamburg, Germany	Annual technoparade in Hamburg, attracting tens of thousands of attendees.	
Ten Days Off	1995–present	Amsterdam and Ghent, Belgium	Started in 1995, "10 Days Off" began as a 10-day-long Belgian celebration of techno music which has since grown to be a yearly club event. Several concert venues in the cities of Ghent, Belgium and Amsterdam, Netherlands.	
World Electronic Music Festival	1995–2008, 2011–present	Ontario	Canada's longest running electronic music festival. Started and still run by Destiny Event Productions. Three-day summer all day, all night event is held across Southern Ontario, Canada.	
Reincarnation Parade	1995–2006	Hanover, Germany	Large annual technoparade and subsequent rave in Hanover, Germany.	
Astropolis	1995–present	Brest, France	Large annual electronic music festival, usually taking place in July or August.	
Organic Music Festival	1996–1997	United States	One of the earliest large-production electronic music festivals in the U.S., bringing electronic dance music to the mainstream, featuring The Chemical Brothers, Orbital, Underworld, and other artists.	
Earthdance	1996–present	Worldwide	Taking place annually in over 300 locations and 60 countries, every year, musicians, DJs, artists, and speakers convene at local Earthdance events to share inspiration and "dance for peace and the healing of our planet Earth."	
Amsterdam Dance Event	1996–present	Amsterdam	Annual five-day event organized by The Amsterdam Dance Event Foundation. Has daytime conferences at local universities and the electronic ADE Festival at night, with over 2,000 DJs.	
Electric Daisy Carnival	1997–present	United States	Electric Daisy Carnival, commonly known as EDC, is the largest electronic dance music festival in North America. It is operated by Insomniac Events. In 2011, EDC moved its flagship festival to Las Vegas, Nevada. EDC events are held in other United States cities and abroad too.	
Lake Parade	1997–present	Geneva, Switzerland	A large technoparade which is organised every year. Every year there are up to 20 Lovemobiles.	
Melt! Festival	1997–2024	Gräfenhainichen, Germany	One of the biggest open-air electronic music festivals in Germany. The festival took place in the Ferropolis open-air museum.	
ETD Pop	1997–present	San Francisco	ETD Pop is an annual electronic music festival held at the Cow Palace in Daly City, California, a suburb of San Francisco. It is hosted by the Berkeley-based event promoters Skills.	
Boom Festival	1997–present	Idanha-a-Nova, Portugal	A biennial transformational festival in Portugal. The festival features musical performances and a broad variety of visual art exhibits. Boom Festival began as a psychedelic trance music festival. Nowadays, other genres like techno, house and world music are played too.	
SonneMond Sterne	1997–present	Saalburg-Ebersdorf, Thüringen	An open-air festival featuring electronic dance music. The first festival was in 1997 with 2,500 people. The 15th festival in 2011 reached 35,000.	
Rainbow Serpent Festival	1997–present	Victoria, Australia	A large electronic music, art and lifestyle festival, mainly known for psytrance and minimal techno music, but also featuring other genres of electronic music and non-electronic music on the smaller stages, as well as art installations and workshops.	
Fuckparade	1997–present	Berlin	A technoparade which stemmed in reaction to the music restriction and commercialization of Love Parade, first named Hateparade. The most played styles of music are gabber, speedcore, techno, punk, and house.	
Monster Massive	1997–2011	Los Angeles	A yearly electronic music rave held near Halloween and founded by Go Ventures, where many of the attendees dress in costume.	

==== 1998–1999 ====
Name	Year	Location	Notes	Picture
Full Moon Party	1998–present	Ko Pha Ngan, Thailand	First held at a wooden disco not far from the beach early 1980s, though not yet electronic in focus, the parties gained fame through word of mouth, and the event now draws a crowd of about 5,000–30,000 every full moon evening. The bars on the beach stay open and play music such as psychedelic trance, R&B, drum and bass, house, dance and reggae.	
Scandinavian Alternative Music Awards	1998–2007	Gothenburg, Sweden	The Scandinavian Alternative Music Awards (SAMA) was a music festival and award ceremony for electronic music held each year in Gothenburg between 1998 and 2007.	
Summadayze	1998–present	Australia and New Zealand	The 2006 event in Melbourne saw 23,000 tickets sellout for a 15-hour event.	
Homelands	1990s?–2005?	United Kingdom	was a British music festival which consisted mainly of dance music, both live acts and famous DJs. was one of the most popular British festivals of this genre. Run by Live Nation UK, it also had editions in Scotland.	
Copenhagen Distortion	1998–present	Copenhagen	A celebration of Copenhagen street life and international club culture. With an estimated 100,000 guests per day, it is one of the largest annual gatherings in Europe. Distortion is a mobile festival.	
Infest Festival	1998–present	Bradford, United Kingdom	An annual three-day music festival held at the University of Bradford Union on the August bank holiday weekend, featuring alternative electronic music acts from genres including industrial, EBM, futurepop, synthpop and power noise.	
Ultra Music Festival	1998–present	Miami	An outdoor electronic music event held annually in March founded by Russell Faibisch and Alex Omes. Takes place across seven different stages, features top DJs, artists, and live acts. Focuses on many genres, including electro, techno, trap, deep house, drum and bass, tech house, progressive house, dubstep, and trance. There are editions all around the world too.	
OM Festival	1998–2013	Ontario	Community-based summer solstice festival that ran annually in southern Ontario. The festival, organized by Sumkidz (now Suma), primarily featured electronic music as well as dance, workshops, art, and other forms of acoustic music.	
Creamfields	1998–present	United Kingdom	Creamfields festival features DJs and live acts, and is held annually on the UK's August Bank Holiday weekend in England. The festival began in 1998 and is run by the Cream clubbing brand supporters. It's the UK's oldest and most prestigious electronic dance music festival. In addition to the main UK event, Creamfields also operates a number of international spin offs. Creamfields Buenos Aires was the first Creamfields festival to be organised outside the UK.	
Hradhouse Festival	1998–present	Boskovice, Czech Republic	Annual festival	
PlanetLove	1998-2003, 2005–present	Northern Ireland	Annual festival	
Scattered	1998–present	Sydney	Founded in 1998 as a small 150 person event, it has grown over time to large-scale rave which hosts major happy hardcore, gabber and hard trance DJs.	
New West Electro-Acoustic Music Organization (NWEAMO)	1998–present	Portland, Oregon	An event with the mission to forge connections between the composers, performers and lovers of avant garde classical music and the DJs, MCs, guitar-gods, troubadours and gourmets of experimental popular music to produce an annual international festival of electro-acoustic music.	
Together as One	1998–2011	Los Angeles	A festival that was held on New Year's Eve as a collaboration between Go Ventures and Insomniac; the partners split in 2011, with Go organizing one more event on its own before the 2012–13 edition was abruptly cancelled due to venue issues.	
Shambhala	1998–present	Nelson, British Columbia	The largest and one of the longest-running electronic music events in Canada, held in July at a 500 acres (2.0 km^{2}) cattle ranch in the mountains. Since the beginning, it has been a family-run event and has never accepted corporate sponsorship.	
Camp Bisco	1999–present	Scranton, Pennsylvania	An electronic and jam band music festival, hosted and centered around The Disco Biscuits at Montage Mountain in Scranton. The Disco Biscuits launched Camp Bisco in 1999 with the idea of combining sets by electronic DJs with improvisational rock bands.	
Marsatac	1999–present	Marseille, France	It was originally dedicated to the Marseille hip hop scene, then expanded progressively to international hip-hop, then to electro, rock and, since 2008, to African music for one night. In 2012, more than 35,000 people attended in the festival.	
Bats Day in the Fun Park	1999–present	Anaheim, California	Started in August 1999 as a joint effort between the promoters of the goth/industrial and deathrock clubs Absynthe and Release the Bats. It has become an annual three-day event.	
Tinnitus	1999–2009	Stockholm	An annual alternative music festival focusing on the subgenres of alternative electronic music such as industrial, EBM, synthpop and futurepop.	
Maschinenfest	1999–2018	Aachen, Germany; since 2010, Oberhausen, Germany	A yearly, three-day underground music festival featuring industrial, power electronics, and alternative electronic performers who include both independent and signed bands, held in a bunker.	
CTM Festival (formerly Club Transmediale)	1999–present	Berlin	Now titled the CTM Festival, an annual music and visual arts event originally focused on electronic music, but has since evolved to cover a wide range of genres under the banner "festival for adventurous music and related visual arts".	
Eclipse Festival	1999–present	Quebec	A weekend-long international gathering of visual and musical art, it features a symbiosis of dance, open philosophies, performance art, and human (and spiritual) experiences.	
Trance Energy	1999–2010	Netherlands	Founded by ID&T as a large trance event.	
Norbergfestival	1999–present	Norberg, Sweden	Held in Sweden.	

=== 2000s: Growth of commercial raves ===
==== 2000–2002 ====
Name	Year	Location	Notes	Picture
EXIT	2000–present	Novi Sad, Serbia	Founded as a student movement fighting for democracy and freedom, it quickly grew into one of the largest mainstream annual music events in Europe. It is held every July in Novi Sad, Serbia in Petrovaradin fortress which is situated on the Danube river.	
ZoukOut	2000–present	Singapore and Malaysia	One of Asia's biggest music dance festivals, it is organised by Zouk Singapore. DJs that have performed at ZoukOut include Paul Van Dyk, 2ManyDJS, Masters at Work, Gilles Peterson, Richie Hawtin, etc.	
Unyazi Electronic Music Festival	2000–present	South Africa	NewMusicSA also runs the Unyazi Electronic Music Festival, which alternates with the New Music Indaba on an annual basis.	
Netmage	2000–present	Bologna, Italy	An international festival dedicated to electronic art as a multidisciplinary program of works, investigating and promoting contemporary audiovisual research.	
Dissonanze	2000–present	Rome	A yearly festival focused on electronic music held in Rome, Italy. The first edition was in 2000. In addition to music, it also focuses on multimedia & video art.	
Snowbombing	2000–present	Europe	Held in Scandinavian locations at ski resorts.	
MUTEK	2000–present	International	New art forms festival devoted to "experimental electronic music, audio-visual spectrum, digital creativity, and transmedial art." As of 2005, events have been held in Montreal (where it started), Valparaiso, Mexico City, Barcelona, Toronto, New York City, São Paulo, and Berlin.	
Sound Summit	2000–present	Australia	A yearly event that focuses on independent electronic music and hip hop as part of the annual This Is Not Art Festival. It is usually composed of artist development workshops.	
Detroit Electronic Music Festival	2000–present	Detroit, Michigan	Electronic dance music showcase held each Memorial Day weekend, which has featured performances by musicians and DJs, and emphasized the progressive qualities of the culture surrounding electronic music. The city's support for the festival has been seen by many as the first high-profile acknowledgement and celebration of the city as the birthplace of techno music.	
Qlimax	2000–2024	Netherlands	Annual hardstyle and hard dance event held since 2003 at the Gelredome, in Arnhem, Netherlands. Since 2003, each edition has had its own anthem to symbolize the theme of the event.	
Sensation	2000–present	Netherlands and other countries	Dutch indoor dance event. Sensation events are held all around the world too. In 2000 and 2001 there were single events simply known as Sensation. Later, Sensation was expanded into two annual events known as Sensation White (focusing initially on trance and later on house) and Sensation Black (which focused on harder styles and more underground sound). Later, the names of both events changed to Sensation and BLACK, respectively. Attendees were required to wear all black or all white, depending on the event. BLACK is no longer celebrated.	
How Weird Street Faire	2000–present	San Francisco	Annual electronic music festival to "connect the diverse electronic music communities and spread peace". Now has a wide range of dance music, including live electronica, world beat, dubstep, breaks, electro, trance, house, techno, and drum & bass.	
Ricochet Gathering	2000–present	various	In April 2000, the first gathering was held at the Okefenokee Swamp. Genres vary from old-style retro to up-scale, modern contemporary electronic music. Locations can be difficult to get to. All of the music created at each gathering is live, unrehearsed, spontaneous and recorded in one take. The Ricochet Dream music label publishes and records the music created at the event.	
Lightning in a Bottle	2000–present	Central Coast California	A transformational festival presented by The Do LaB.	
Chillits	2000–present	Willits, California	A small, exclusive, annual ambient music festival held every September at a private retreat center in Willits, California. It was started by the Cloud Factory community, and ticket distribution is largely based on participation.	
Electronic Music Midwest	2000–present	Kansas City, Kansas	A festival of new electro-acoustic music, was created as the result of a group formed in 2002 between Kansas City Kansas Community College (KCKCC), Lewis University, and the University of Missouri–Kansas City. Overall it has as featured over 300 new electro-acoustic compositions.	
Electrofringe	2001–2011	Newcastle, New South Wales	A part of This Is Not Art, involves various installations and hands-on workshops.	
Five Days Off	2001–present	Amsterdam	A festival that includes music and cultural events in Amsterdam, Netherlands. It started in 2001 as spin-off of Ghent, Belgium's Ten Days Off Festival.	
Global Gathering	2001–2014	Long Marston, England	The festival was organized by the Godskitchen brand, and was held annually in the UK. There were editions in other countries too.	
Lumous Gothic Festival	2001–2020	Finland	Commonly known as Lumous, was the largest festival dedicated to the goth subculture in Finland and the northernmost Gothic festival in the world. It covers musical genres such as gothic rock, deathrock, industrial, EBM and neofolk.	
Electroclash Festival	2001–2004	New York City	Electroclash came to media attention in 2001, when the Electroclash Festival was held in New York. The Electroclash Festival was held again with live tours across the US and Europe. Other notable artists who performed at the festivals and subsequent tours include Scissor Sisters, ADULT., Fischerspooner, Mignon, Miss Kittin & The Hacker, Mount Sims, Tiga and Spalding Rockwell.	
Vision Parade	2002–2006	Bremen, Germany	Annual technoparade in Bremen, attracting tens of thousands of attendees.	
New Interfaces for Musical Expression	2002–present	various	Also known as NIME, is an international conference dedicated to scientific research on the development of new technologies for musical expression and artistic performance.	
C2C Festival (formerly Club To Club)	2002– present	Turin, Italy	C2C Festival (known as Club To Club until 2019) is an avant-pop and electronic music festival held annually in Turin, Italy, since 2002. It is considered one of the largest indoor music festivals in the country.	C2C Festival 2023
Electroacoustic Music Days	2002–present	Greece	Annual event organized by the Hellenic Electroacoustic Music Composers Association, which takes place in various cities and institutions throughout Greece. During these events, some of the latest electroacoustic works from Greece and abroad are showcased.	
MAGFest	2002–present	National Harbor, Maryland	Annual video game, art, music, and culture festival. A chiptune-focused main stage show (aptly named "Chip Rave") typically occurs on the third day of the festival within the concert hall and has featured countless prominent faces in the chiptune community. MAGFest also holds a continuous stage called Chipspace, a place where participants in the chiptune community go on-stage and perform their music through either a curated showcase or an open mic system.	
Insomnia Festival	2002–present	Tromsø, Norway	Alongside the Numusic festival in Stavanger and Ekkofestival in Bergen, it is the largest festival for electronic music in Norway.	
Xtra Bass	2002–present	United Kingdom	A free week-long drum and bass tour of the UK hosted by the BBC's digital radio station BBC Radio 1Xtra. The tour covers 7 cities in 7 days.	
Les Siestes Electroniques	2002–present	Toulouse, France	Summer festival dedicated to emerging artists from the field of music & digital culture.	
Airbeat One	2002–present	Neustadt-Glewe, Germany	Large-scale annual festival. 2022 with a total of 200,000 visitors. Until 2004 under the name Airbase One.	
Area Festival	2001–2002	North America	Founded by electronic musician Moby, who asserted that he was "in large part, inspired by the ethos of Lollapalooza", and wished to create a similarly "genuinely eclectic, interesting, alternative music festival". First called Area:One in 2001, and the sequel tour Area2, in 2002.	

==== 2003–2004 ====
Name	Year	Location	Notes	Picture
Nuits Sonores	2003–present	Lyon, France	Electronic music festival. It usually occurs for five days in May of each year since 2003.	
TodaysArt	2003–present	The Hague, Netherlands	At the end of September each year, TodaysArts has a program at 20 indoor and outdoor venues in the center of the city, with over 200 artists from more than 25 countries. The first edition had 5,000 visitors.	
GOGBOT	2003–present	Enschede, Netherlands	The festival deals with subjects on the area of multimedia, art, music and technology. GOGBOT is a free entrance festival. It has around 20,000 visitors and is known for its controversial themes.	
Summer Darkness	2003–present	Utrecht, Netherlands	Acts perform in various clubs throughout the city of Utrecht. The festival was a joint venture by Cybercase, Tivoli (Utrecht), EKKO and Mojo until EKKO made the decision in 2009 to quit.	
Inox Festival	2003–present	Toulouse, France	Annual electronic music festival that has hosted DJs such as Joachim Garraud and Avicii.	
Moonpark	2003–present	Buenos Aires	Held three times annually since 2003. Some of the acts performed during its last editions included John Digweed, Sasha, Hernán Cattáneo, and Satoshi Tomiie.	
Drop Dead Festival	2003–present	United States and Europe	An electro, post-punk, synthpunk, and experimental multiple-day festival, and the largest DIY festival for "art-damaged" music.	
Lovebox Festival	2003–present	Victoria Park, London	A music festival for two days in July. Originally, Lovebox was the name of a nightclub hosted by Groove Armada. It was a one-day festival on London's Clapham Common until 2004.	
Defqon.1	2003–present	Netherlands	Annual music festival held in Netherlands. It has been editions in Australia and Chile too. Founded by Q-dance, it plays mostly hardstyle and related genres such as hardcore techno, hard house and hard trance.	
Piknic Électronik	2003–present	Montreal and Barcelona	Annual festival held in Montreal, with artists such as Wolfgang Gartner headlining.	
Unsound Festival	2003–present	Kraków, Poland	Dealing with evolving and mutating forms of music, as well as related visual arts.	
60x60	2003–present	International	Annual festival which tours the world. It was conceived and developed by the new music consortium Vox Novus. A continuous sixty-minute concert, it is a collection of 60 electro-acoustic or acousmatic works from 60 different composers or sound artists, each work 60 seconds or less.	
Ekkofestival	2003–present	Bergen, Norway	The Ekkofestival, Ekkofest or Ekko-Bergen Electronic Music and Art Festival, is an annual fall music festival. The festival mainly focuses on electronic music and contemporary art, with a multitude of genres.	
Pirate Station	2003–present	Russia	Pirate Station takes place annually in Russia.	
Bang Face	2003–present	United Kingdom	A regular electronic dance music event that takes place at various venues across the UK. Starting as a monthly club night in London, it has grown to include an annual three-day weekender at Camber Sands and Newquay, a boat party on the River Thames, and other events.	
Reverence	2003–2009	Madison, Wisconsin	An electronic music festival. Featuring primarily aggrotech, electro-industrial and synthpop bands, it has also included other electronic dance music genres as well.	
Konemetsä	2004–2009	Finland	Konemetsä Open Air Forest Festival has music played continuously 24 hours a day.	
Decibel Festival	2004–present	Seattle, Washington	An "International Festival of Electronic Music Performance, Visual Art and New Media". It is held every September. In 2011 it was 5 days long. It also includes a free, all-ages 3 day conference.	
O.Z.O.R.A.	2004–present	Ozora, Hungary	Psychedelic trance festival which has been held on an estate in Ozora every year since 2004. The first party was called Solipse and took place during the Solar eclipse of 11 August 1999. Several spin-offs have been held in other cities such as Tokyo, Paris and São Paulo.	
Wild in the Country	2004–present	Staffordshire, England	Gigwise.com describes Wild in the Country as "the ideal festival for lovers of electronic music" and notes that the festival is part of a Renaissance tradition of holding gigs in picturesque settings like Allerton Castle and Shugborough Hall. The last festival was at Knebworth Park starting on 30 June 2007 with Underworld, Hot Chip and Sasha and Digweed.	
Systo Palty	2004–present	Russia	Open-air annual art and music festival featuring trance music.	
Moogfest	2004–2008, 2010–present	Asheville, North Carolina	First held in New York City, the annual two to five-day electronic music festival was moved to Asheville, where Robert Arthur "Bob" Moog, the inventor of the Moog synthesizer and founding father of electronic music, was based.	
Output Festival	2004–present	Amsterdam	Dutch tri-annual music festival which focuses on experimental, contemporary electroacoustic music related to the electric guitar.	
Electric Picnic	2004–present	Stradbally, Ireland	Features dance music, as well as rock and pop. Its history includes international acts such as Kraftwerk, Röyksopp, Nick Cave, Sonic Youth, New Order, and Björk.	
C.O.M.A.	2004–present	Montreal, Quebec	A yearly weekend underground music festival that features industrial, power electronics, alternative electronic musicians and DJs. In 2008, C.O.M.A. was essentially replaced by the Kinetik Festival, which ran until 2013. In 2014, Kinetik was replaced by Aftermath, held in Toronto and featuring many of the same bands that were originally intended to play at the seventh edition of Kinetik.	
Eccentrik	2004–present	Raleigh, North Carolina	A three-day industrial and goth music festival. Started in October 2004, Eccentrik features various musical styles including deathrock, gothabilly, industrial, gothic rock, psychobilly, post-punk, synthpop and other related genres.	
UltraMar Festival	2004–2009, 2013	Cartagena, Colombia	More than 130 international artists have participated in the festival, including Armin van Buuren, David Guetta, Tiesto, Paul Van Dyk, etc. In 2008, the Ultramar Festival joined with Summer Dance Festival, another important festival of the city of Cartagena, to form UltraSummer Festival.	
Soundwave Festival	2004–present	San Francisco, California	Formerly the Soundwave Series. Founded by Alan So from the ME'DI.ATE Art Group to explore "innovative sound experiences with diverse local and international artists and musicians". Held every two years for two months in San Francisco.	
LovEvolution	2004–2009, 2011	Bay Area, California	Formerly San Francisco LovEvolution and San Francisco LoveFest. It was a technoparade and festival that occurred annually and had its origins in Berlin's Love Parade.	
Glade Festival	2004–present	England	An electronic dance music festival that originally began as a stage at Glastonbury Festival.	
Groove Cruise	2004–present	United States	An electronic dance music cruise festival that sets sail from various U.S. ports, offering an experience that combines, music, dance, travel and philanthropy.	Drone show on Groove Cruise Miami 2025 aboard Royal Caribbean's Allure Of The Seas

==== 2005–2006 ====
Name	Year	Location	Notes	Picture
Tomorrowland	2005–present	Boom, Belgium	The largest electronic music festival held in the world, with over 400,000 attending in 2014. First organized by the original founders and ID&T. There have been three spin-off: TomorrowWorld, Tomorrowland Brasil and Tomorrowland Winter. The first one are no longer held.	
Berlin Festival	2005–present	Berlin	Two-day outdoor rock and electro music event near the city of Berlin, first organized in 2005. Since then, its audience has grown to about 20,000 visitors.	
Hartera	2005–present	Rijeka, Croatia	An annual electronica music festival. The name derives from the festival's location, an old paper factory (which was one of the largest in Europe) that functioned for 150 years before shutting down.	
Amphi Festival	2005–present	Germany	Wide-ranging program for a heterogeneous audience, albeit primarily fans of alternative, electronic music, and dark music. The number of visitors to the most recent event in 2009 was 13,000 per festival day.	
Pitchfork Music Festival	2005–present	Chicago	Annual summer music festival focused primarily on artists and bands from alternative rock, rap & hip-hop, electronica, and dance music.	
Aires Libres	2005–present	Marseille, France	Its main goal is to showcase electronic music outdoors, and promote various cultural activities for children and their families through visual art and several artistic workshops.	
Blacksun Festival	2005–2007	New Haven, Connecticut	It was created in 2005 as a 3-day industrial and goth music international festival. Blacksun was meant to give American bands an opportunity to play closer to home than the larger goth festivals in Europe.	
Distorted Music Festival	2005	Melbourne, Australia	One year EDM festival that featured underground/mainstream electronic artists, with the genres of breakcore, IDM, noise, industrial, power noise, and glitch.	
Punktfestivalen	2005–present	Kristiansand, Norway	An annual autumn music festival primarily focusing on live remixing, live sampling and live electronics, involving local and international artists.	
Blowfish Club (Blowfish Warehouse Project)	2006–2010	Jakarta, Indonesia	Blowfish Warehouse Project (BWP) was an electronic dance music club event held in Jakarta, Indonesia. It became one of the most successful EDM club events in the country and later evolved into the Djakarta Warehouse Project, which eventually grew into one of the largest annual electronic dance music festivals in Southeast Asia.	
Isotopia Festival	2006–2008	Australia	Was an annual electronic music, art and lifestyle festival that included environmental speakers, forums, films, local bands, DJs and several workshops. One of the main goals of the festival was to raise awareness against Australian nuclearisation.	
Transmission	2006–present	Prague, Czech Republic	Large indoor trance music event at the o2 Arena. In March 2014, the festival was held for the first time in Slovakia too. Later, the festival has taken place in Australia, Thailand, Germany and China too. Markus Schulz has frequently headlined.	
Life Festival	2006–present	Ireland	Mixes traditional instruments with electronic dance music groups.	
Les Ardentes	2006–present	Belgium	A multi-day electro-rock music festival which takes place annually early July in Liège.	
Beat-Herder	2006– present	Lancashire, England	An annual summer music festival. The festival covers several musical genres including breakbeat, dub, reggae, dubstep, techno, house, drum & bass, folk, dance-punk and psychedelic rock. The event also sees regular appearances from novelty musicians such as the Lancashire Hotpots and William Fairey Acid Brass.	
Blip Festival	2006–2012	New York City, Denmark, Australia, and Tokyo	A chiptune festival.	
Le Guess Who?	2006–present	Utrecht, Netherlands	An annual electronic music festival with over fifteen venues.	
Future Music Festival	2006–present	Australia	An annual music festival featuring Australian and international artists held in Sydney, Melbourne, Brisbane, Adelaide and Perth.	
Bloc Festival	2006–present	England	It is devoted to electronic music of all genres including electro, hip hop, IDM, techno, house music, reggae, drum and bass and dubstep, and incorporates both DJ sets and live shows.	

==== 2007–2009 ====
Name	Year	Location	Notes	Picture
Wintercase	?	Italy		
Seoul World DJ Festival	2007–present	Seoul, South Korea	Music festival initiated as the main program of Hi-Seoul Festival in 2007 at the Nanji Campground on the Han River.	
Open Air Field	2007–present	Luxembourg	The first edition of the event took place in July 2007 under the name Feldparty. Every year the lineup contains many DJs, such as DJ Pikay.	
Secondfest	2007	on-line	A music festival in the Second Life virtual world, with artists such as Simian Mobile Disco, Digitalism, and The Knife.	
HARD	2007–present	United States	A national music festival, music cruise and concert brand founded by Gary Richards in 2007. The event line-ups consist of alternative and electronic acts and emerging talents. The first HARD Music Festival was held on 31 December 2007, in Downtown Los Angeles, and featured Justice.	
Loop Live	2007–present	Bulgaria	Free music event that always includes a host of new and popular artists. The festival is televised usually a week afterwards on City TV.	
Balaton Sound	2007–present	Zamárdi, Hungary	Also known as Heineken Balaton Sound (and as MasterCard Balaton Sound since 2013 for sponsorship reasons), it is one of Europe's largest open-air electronic music festivals.	
Sunburn Festival	2007–present	Goa, India	A large annual EDM festival that first took place in December 2007 at the Candolim Beach in Goa, India.	
Stereosonic	2007–present	Australia	The first festival tour was held in Australia in November/December. The headliners included Armin van Buuren, Booka Shade, Fedde Le Grande and Trentemoller.	
Igloofest	2007–present	Montreal, Quebec	An annual outdoor festival held over the course of 3 or 4 weekends in January and February.	
Lovefest	2007–present	Vrnjačka Banja, Serbia	An annual outdoor festival held over the course of 3 or 4 days, starting on the first Friday of August.	
Connect Music Festival	2007-2008	Argyll, Scotland		
The BPM Festival	2008–present	Playa del Carmen, Mexico; since 2017, Portugal	An annual ten day and night electronic music festival, founded by Craig Pettigrew and Philip Pulitano. It is a global gathering of DJs, producers, partiers and industry professionals. BPM parties are hosted at multiple venues in the beach town Playa Del Carmen. In 2017, the festival was moved to Portugal.	
Coma Dance Festival	2008	Dubai, United Arab Emirates	Took place in November 2008 between two cities in the Middle East, twenty minutes off the coast of Abu Dhabi, UAE, and Forum de Beirut, Lebanon. The festival was proclaimed the first festival dedicated to dance music in the Middle East.	
Outlook Festival	2008–present	Pula, Croatia	A musical event hosting all kinds of bass music, such as dubstep, reggae, hip-hop, ragga, drum and bass, garage, house, and techno.	
International Music Summit	2008–presen	Ibiza, Spain	A 3-day electronic dance music conference, seen as a direct competitor to Miami's Winter Music Conference.	
Electric Forest Festival	2008–present	Rothbury, Michigan	A four-day multi-genre event, with a focus on electronic and jam band genres. It debuted in 2008 as Rothbury Festival, and the new event was not held in 2010. Electric Forest, which debuted in 2011, is co-produced by Insomniac Events and Madison House.	
Time Festival	2008–present	Toronto, Ontario	A one-day, annual summer music festival held in Toronto. The event focuses on electronic music and features DJs and groups from around the world as well as local Toronto artists.	
Ultra Brasil	2008, 2010–2011, 2016	Rio de Janeiro	An EDM festival curated by the team behind Ultra Music Festival that debuted in 2008 in São Paulo and Belo Horizonte, Brazil. In 2016, the festival returned to Rio de Janeiro, Brasil at Quinta da Boa Vista. Artists included Carl Cox and Martin Garrix.	
Subsonic Music Festival	2008–present	Monkerai, Australia	An annual music festival with camping, Subsonic "has gradually embraced house, techno and other forms of dance music alongside its original staples: psytrance and dub".	
The Bounce Festival	2009–present	Plumas County, California	A four-day multi-genre event, with a focus on electronic music culture and installation art. The Big Bounce debuted in Belden, California, in 2009, with Bassnectar and Fort Knox Five headlining. Event producers formulated The Bounce, LLC in 2011, and created The Bounce Festival with Fresh Bakin'. The event remained in Belden until they expanded the event to a larger private Plumas County location in 2013.	
Boomtown	2009–present	Winchester, England	Immersive annual five-day theatrical music festival that takes place near Winchester, Hampshire on the Matterley Estate in South Downs National Park. The festival has a long-running narrative at its core with live actors and themed stages.	
Warriors Dance Festival	2009–2013	Japan, United Kingdom, and Serbia	A one-day electronic music festival curated by The Prodigy.	
Wave Sound	2009–present	Italy		
SkyGravity Festival	2009?	Ukraine	International electronic dance music festival in Ukraine (Crimea, near Evpatoria). Featured genres are psytrance, goa, full on, suomi, progressive and break trance, but also ambient, dub, downtempo, IDM, electronica, experimental, and reggae.	
Electrobeach Music Festival	2009–present	Port-Barcarès, France	A large annual EDM festival held in the summer at a beach resort in France. Recent lineups include Afrojack, Dirty South, and Dizzee Rascal. 2013 saw 56,000 people attend over two days.	
Electric Zoo	2009–present	New York City	An annual electronic music festival held over Labor Day weekend in New York City on Randall's Island. The festival represents all genres of electronic music, bringing top international DJs and live acts from multiple countries along with hometown acts to four stages. There are editions in other countries too.	
Echelon	2009–present	Bad Aibling, Germany	The Echelon open air and indoor festival is an electro and house festival with up to 25,000 attendees, which takes place in August at the abandoned radome field of Bad Aibling Station, which was part of the global surveillance network Echelon.	

=== 2010s: The rise of EDM ===
==== 2010–2012 ====
Name	Year	Location	Notes	Picture
Amber Beach Festival	2010–present	Kaliningrad Oblast, Russia	The first festival was held in Yantarny on 23–25 July 2010. It was headlined by Vopli Vidoplyasova and Dieselboy.	
Djakarta Warehouse Project	2010–present	Jakarta and Bali, Indonesia	The successor to the Blowfish club event, Djakarta Warehouse Project (DWP) became the first and is currently the largest electronic dance music festival in Indonesia. It is often cited as one of the biggest EDM festivals in Southeast Asia. Organized by Ismaya Live. a Few notable DJs who have performed at DWP include Calvin Harris, Alesso, David Guetta, Tiësto, R3hab, Axwell Λ Ingrosso, Zedd, Galantis, and Major Lazer. The festival itself is traditionally held on the second weekend of December.	
Soundscape	2010–2014	Hamilton, New Zealand	The first Soundscape featured three stages of electronic music, expanding to five stages across four Hamilton central city nightclubs. The March 2011 Soundscape was the first to feature live music and international acts, which over 4,000 people attended.	
Escapade Music Festival	2010–present	Ottawa, Ontario	Started as a club night with Deadmau5 headlining and a few hundred attendees. In 2011, it featured three major headliners, and has constantly grew since then.	
Manitoba Electronic Music Exhibition	2010–present	Manitoba, Ontario	MEME is a yearly electronic music and digital arts festival started in 2010 in Winnipeg.	
Beyond Wonderland	2010–present	United States	Electronic dance festival organized by Insomniac Events, spanning one or two days. Locations throughout the west coast of the US. It is the sister festival of Nocturnal Wonderland. In 2017, the international debut of Beyond Wonderland took place in Mexico.	
Utopia Island	2010–present	Moosburg, Germany	Electronic music festival taking place in summer at a lake not far from Munich, covering many electronic styles such as electro, minimal techno, techno, house and drum and bass, with 12,000 attendees in 2016.	
Miami Music Week	2011–present	Miami	A week of electronic music events in the city of Miami.	
Barbarella	2011–present	Santo Domingo, Dominican Republic	The festival has featured performances by Afrojack, Chris Lake, and Empire of the Sun.	
Sun City Music Festival	2011–present	El Paso, Texas	Held around Labor Day by SMG Events and Disco Donnie Presents in El Paso, Texas. It features various electronic music artists across three stages in Ascarate Park.	
Arsenal Fest	2011–present	Kragujevac, Serbia	An annual summer music festival which encompasses several different musical styles, mostly different variations of EDM, punk, rock, downtempo and metal music. It started in 2011 in the central Serbian city of Kragujevac.	
Resistanz	2011–present	Sheffield, England	Large industrial music festival held in Britain.	
Summer Sound	2011–present	Helsinki, Finland	The biggest indoor/outdoor trance music event in Scandinavia. First year performers included stars like Chicane, Above & Beyond, Roger Sanchez and Judge Jules.	
Hideout Festival	2011–present	Zrce, Croatia	On The Guardian's list of the best European festivals of 2011. The event features pool parties, art installations, and utilizes various local venues in addition to the concerts held in the arena.	
Identity Festival	2011–present	United States	Features popular electronic-music artists. The festival tours various North American cities.	
White Wonderland	2011–present	Anaheim, California	Co-organized by Insomniac Events and fellow club promoter Giant. The event was first held for New Year's Eve in 2011, following the announcement that Insomniac had pulled out of co-organizing the New Year's Eve festival Together as One due to conflicts with its fellow organizer Go Ventures.	
Escape From Wonderland	2011–present	California	Held around Halloween by Insomniac Events in Southern California, featuring artists like Afrojack, Benny Benassi, Cedric Gervais, and Crizzly. The festival was titled Escape All Hallows Eve in 2014.	
Rewire Festival	2012–present	The Hague, Netherlands	Annual festival with a two-day program, with artists such as Lee Gamble and Kode9.	
Lucidity	2012–present	Southern California	Features three main stages and numerous smaller stages with bands, spoken word artists, exotic dancers and DJs.	
VELD Music Festival	2012–present	Toronto, Ontario	The VELD is Canada's second biggest electronic dance music music festival. The inaugural event took place on August 4–5, 2012.	
BUKU Music + Art Project	2012–present	New Orleans, Louisiana	A New Orleans–based two-day music and arts festival, founded in 2012 by Winter Circle Productions and held annually at Mardi Gras World. BUKU's musical tastes have been a relatively even mix of electronic dance music, hip hop music, and indie rock featuring past performances by Ellie Goulding, Kid Cudi, and others.	
BAALS Music Festival	2012–present	Fort Wayne, Indiana	Beyond trance, techno, and house, the festival also focuses on jam band music.	
Spring Zouk	2012	Karnataka, India	The three-day festival was a project coordinated by the state government and various sponsors to attract international tourism, featuring artists such as Juno Reactor. Led to Porngate.	
Future Music Festival Asia	2012–present	Kuala Lumpur, Malaysia	Often abbreviated as FMFA, it is an annual music festival featuring local and international artists held in Kuala Lumpur, Malaysia. FMFA is a spinoff of Future Music Festival.	
Spring Awakening	2012–present	Chicago, Illinois	Annual musical festival for progressive house, electro house, techno, etc.	
Ultra Buenos Aires	2012–2015	Buenos Aires, Argentina	Curated by the Ultra Music Festival team.	
RFM Somnii	2012–present	Figueira da Foz, Portugal	A three-day festival held annually in early July.	
Weekend Festival	2012–present	Helsinki, Finland	Weekend Festival hosts primarily electronic artists, with some other genres. The festival has been sold out every year in advance. 40,000–60,000 people attend every year.	
Paradiso Festival	2012–2019	George, Washington	Annual EDM festival held at The Gorge Amphitheatre on the Columbia River. Founded by USC Events and Live Nation Entertainment, 2012 attendance exceeded 20,000 people. The 2013 event saw performances by Kaskade and Tiesto. The festival ceased operations after 2019 due to a lawsuit between USC Events and Insomniac Events.	
Ultra Korea	2012–present	Seoul, South Korea	Annual electronic dance music festival curated by Ultra Music Festival. In 2016, the festival celebrated five years at the Olympic Stadium in Seoul, Korea.	
Holy Ship!	2012–present	Miami to The Bahamas	An annual three-night, four-day electronic dance music festival held aboard a 4,000 capacity cruise ship, which leaves out of Port Miami in Miami, FL. 2016 will mark the event's fifth year since its inception in 2012,	

==== 2013–2014 ====
Name	Year	Location	Notes	Picture
Electric Love	2013–present	Plainfeld, Austria	Takes place at the second weekend in July at the Salzburgring. Headliners have included Hardwell, Dimitri Vegas & Like Mike, and David Guetta.	
Oxegen 2013	2013	Ireland	The ninth Oxegen festival to take place since 2004, it was the first to focus on electronic music instead of rock music. Calvin Harris and David Guetta were among the featured artists.	
7107 International Music Festival	2013	Pampanga, Philippines	A rock and electronic music festival featuring Kaskade and Alvaro, Natives, Reid Stefan, Kid Ink, DJ Riddler and The Asteroids Galaxy Tour.	
Morning Gloryville	2013–present	United Kingdom	Originally named Morning Glory, the festival is a sober, drug-free morning rave.	
TomorrowWorld	2013–2015	Chattahoochee Hills, Georgia	Organized by ID&T Belgium, it is a spinoff of Tomorrowland. In its inaugural year, TomorrowWorld received a nomination for Best Music Event at the International Dance Music Awards.	
Electric Castle Festival	2013–present	Romania	One of the biggest Romanian music festivals. It takes place annually at Bánffy's Castle Domain in Cluj County, Romania.	
Forestland	2013–present	Međimurje, Croatia	An electronic dance music festival in Međimurje, Croatia.	
Psy-Fi	2013–present	Leeuwarden	A psychedelic music and arts festival held annually in August.	
Ultra Europe	2013–present	Split & Hvar, Croatia	Also known as Destination Ultra - Croatia Music Week, the event lasts seven days and takes place across Croatia. The main festival lasts three days and takes place at the Poljud Stadium in Split.	
Ultra Chile	2013–present	Santiago, Chile	A Santiago, Chile–based version of the popular North American Ultra Music Festival in Miami. In 2016, the festival was a one-day event entitled Road to Ultra.	
Peacock Society	2013–present	Paris, France	An annual electronic music festival held in Paris, France, known for its eclectic blend of techno, house, and experimental electronic music. Launched in 2013.	A huge crowd dances under the multicolored projectors illuminating an art-nouveau metal hanger of the Parc Floral in Paris, FRANCE
Riverside Festival	2013–present	Gatineau, Quebec	An annual 3-day EDM festival taking place outside the Canadian Museum of History on a single 7,000-capacity stage.	
Ultra Japan	2014–present	Tokyo	The festival first started in 2014 and lasted two days, but was extended to three days. It consisted of three stages: the Main Stage, Ultra Worldwide Stage, and Resistance Stage.	
Ultra South Africa	2014–present	Cape Town & Johannesburg, South Africa	The event started off as a two-day festival, now spanning across three days with three stages.	
Road to Ultra	2014–present	multiple locations	Road to Ultra was introduced in 2014 with multiple stops, with most of those stops continuing in 2016. Among them are Road to Ultra: Colombia, Road to Ultra: Thailand, Road to Ultra: Taiwan, and Road to Ultra: Paraguay. Road to Ultra: Philippines debuted in 2015, as did Road to Ultra: Bolivia and Road to Ultra: Peru. Road to Ultra: Puerto Rico was held in 2015, and Road to Ultra: Macau was held only once in 2015, switching to Road to Ultra: Hong Kong in 2016.	
Electric Paradise	2014–present	Punta Cana, Dominican Republic	The Electric Paradise festival has had performances from Steve Aoki, Tiesto, Martin Garrix, Otto Knows, Moti, Blasterjaxx, Skrillex, and Steve Angello.	
Sea Dance Festival	2014–present	Jaz Beach in Budva, Montenegro	The festival has been part of the EXIT Adventure, representing an additional 3 days of EXIT Festival. The key stages include the Main stage with a 30,000-capacity, Dance Paradise, Reggae Stage, Silent Dance, Latino Stage, Cinema, and Full.feel.CHILL Zone.	
Empire Music Festival	2014–present	Guatemala	The biggest music festival in Central America, with performances from Martin Garrix, Skrillex, Calvin Harris, Tiësto, DJ Snake, Timmy Trumpet, The Chainsmokers, Alesso, Marshmello and many others.	
EUphoria	2014–present	Mauritius	The first festival to bring live EDM acts to Mauritius. David Jay performed the first year, and 2015 brought Dimitri Vegas & Like Mike.	
ÎleSoniq Music Festival	2014–present	Montreal, Quebec	Canada's largest EDM festival. Occurring every year in early August, the 2-day festival attracts over 40,000 people per day across three stages.	
SocialBuzz Music Festival S.M.F	2014–present	Mauritius	An annual festival held over the last weekend of November at L'Aventure du Sucre, Beau Plan. Representing all genres of electronic music, it brings live acts from multiple countries along with local DJs. The event also features a music arena and entertainment village. Previous artists include Otto Knows, Riva Starr, Nick Warren, and Darin Epsilon.	
Stylematic	2014–present	Dhaka, Bangladesh	An annual electronic dance music festival started in January 2014. It is known for inviting international DJs.	
Coincidance Festival	2014–present	Playa del Carmen, Quintana Roo, Mexico	Coincidance is a festival held in the jungles and beaches of the Caribbean. The 2014 lineup included Mihai Popoviciu, Climbers and Paul Johnson. The 2015 headliners were Fur Coat, Francesca Lombardo, DVS1, Jimpster, Crazy P, and Einmusik.	
Pangyo Techno Valley Festival	2014	Pangyo, South Korea	May be cancelled after a safety incident led to several deaths.	
Midwest Wonderland Music Festival	2014–present	Rochelle, Illinois	A two-day music and arts festival which takes place at Chicagoland Skydiving Center. The event is a Wonderland themed event with many activities and attractions, including skydiving.	
Neon Festival	2014–present	Turkey	The festival began in the 4th biggest city of Turkey.	
Amsterdam Music Festival	2014–present	Amsterdam	A large event organized by ALDA Events and ID&T.	
Dreamland	2014–present	Ancient Olympia, Greece	A three-day event that aims to promote different types of electronic music, art and culture with an ecological theme. There are interactive workshops and sports activities in the Alfeios River, such as kayaking, rafting, and hydrospeed.	
Alfa Future People Festival	2014–present	Nizhny Novgorod, Russia	An electronic music and technology festival on the coast of the Volga. Headliners have included Skillex, Atb, Avicii, Benny Benassi, Nero, Matisse & Sadko, Dimitri Vegas & Like Mike, Martin Garrix, and Yellow Claw.	
Barcelona Beach Festival	2014–present	Barcelona, Spain	One of the biggest electronic music-centered events in Spain, held every second weekend at Barcelona, with DJs as Martin Garrix, Hardwell, Alesso, and Sander Van Doorn.	
Moonrise (festival)	2014–present	Baltimore, Maryland	Electronic music festival held at Pimlico Race Course, taking the place of Starscape Festival. The Moonrise concept was first publicly introduced in 2013, but organizers failed to obtain permits for the festival in time. Bassnectar headlined the festival the first three years, alongside Kaskade in 2014, Above & Beyond in 2015, and The Chainsmokers, Tiësto, and Zedd in 2016.	
Transient Festival	2014–present	Paris	Paris-based festival dedicated to electronic arts, digital culture and experimental music.	
Kosmos	2014–present	Ristiina, Finland	A 3-stage festival concentrating mostly on underground electronic music, such as psytrance, drum and bass, and techno.	

==== 2015–present ====
Name	Year	Location	Notes	Picture
CRSSD Festival	2015–present	San Diego	A biannual electronic dance music event with a mix of house, techno, electro, and indie dance music in San Diego.	
Dreamstate	2015–present	Southern California	Biggest trance event in the United States. Dreamstate has taken place in San Francisco, Mexico City, London, Melbourne, Los Angeles and New York too.	
AUM Festival	2015–present	Auckland, New Zealand	Aims to promote a culture of inclusivity and social and environmental responsibility in a family-oriented atmosphere. 5 zones set on 600 acres of deer farms include 4 music stages, a silent disco, a circus play zone, a market area and a glade with workshops on all subjects, healers, and yoga instructors.	
Twisted Frequency Festival	2015–present	Golden Bay, New Zealand	Aotearoa's home of underground music and culture. 5 days of diversity and community in the heart of Golden Bay.	
GEM Fest	2015–present	Anaklia, Georgia	Held on the beach of Anaklia every summer, the festival attracted more than 30,000 people in 2016. Headliners have included Armin van Buuren, Who Made Who, GusGus, Paul Kalkbrenner, and Fedde Le Grand.	
AVA Festival	2015–present	Belfast	Based in Belfast, AVA events have been held worldwide. The 2022 festival had c. 16,000 attendees and featured artists such as Holly Lester and Bicep.	
Parookaville	2015–present	Weeze, Germany	The event has featured a number of notable international acts such as Armin van Buuren, Steve Aoki, Tiësto, Robin Schulz, and Hardwell. It had 25,000 attendees in 2015 and grew to 50,000 people in 2016. For the event in 2017, 80,000+ tickets were sold. Some people call the event the 'German Tomorrowland'.	
Untold	2015–present	Cluj-Napoca, Romania	Attracted around 200,000 people and a number of well-known international DJs.	
Weekend Festival Baltic	2015–2018	Pärnu, Estonia	Held on Pärnu beach, the festival is a spinoff of Weekend Festival and is the largest EDM festival in the Baltic area. Headliners have included Armin van Buuren, David Guetta, Tiësto, Martin Garrix, and Hardwell.	
Future Music Festival World	2015–present	Australia, 52 countries	Themed after a futuristic fantasy land, the festival has been held in Sydney, Adaline, Perth, Kuala Lumpur, Safari, and Asia. It features both local acts and international artists at each location.	
Ultra Bali	2015–present	Bali, Indonesia	Introduced in 2015 as part of Ultra Music Festival's worldwide expansion. The festival lasts two days and takes place at the Potato Head Beach Club in Bali.	
Ultra Singapore	2015–present	Singapore	Introduced in 2015 as a one-day, single-stage Road to Ultra event, curated by the team behind Ultra Music Festival.	
The Flying Dutch	2015–present	Netherlands and Sweden	The event, hosted by Alda Events, takes place at three locations simultaneously. The artists are flown to every location by helicopter. Amsterdam, Rotterdam, and Eindhoven are the Dutch Edition locations, while Den Bosch, Nijmegen, and The Hague are the Swedish Edition locations.	
Zug der Liebe	2015–present	Berlin, Germany	An annual technoparade and demonstration similar to the Fuckparade. It attracted about 30,000 people in its first year.	
EDMANIA	2015–present	Trenčín, Slovakia	EDMANIA is an electronic dance music festival that started in the winter of 2015 as a one-day indoor festival. It gradually grew, leading to the addition of summer and winter editions, and in the summer of 2018, it became a two-days outdoor festival. The event has hosted Armin van Buuren, Axwell Λ Ingrosso, Timmy Trumpet and many others.	
Ikarus Festival	2015–present	Memmingen, Germany	Ikarus is a yearly EDM event which grew to 40000 visitors. It's three days on an old military airfield with multiple stages, some in shelter hangars, some outdoors. The event has hosted Ben Klock, Boris Brejcha, Charlotte de Witte, Claptone, Dixon, Fritz Kalkbrenner, Lost Frequencies, Martin Solveig, Nina Kraviz, Pan-Pot, Richie Hawtin, Sam Paganini, Solomun, Sven Väth and many others.	
BiH Color Festival	2016–present	Brčko, Bosnia and Herzegovina	A festival based on the Indian and Nepali spring festival Holi ( /ˈhoʊliː/; Sanskrit: होली Holī). Festival attendees cover themselves in washable plant-derived colors such as turmeric, neem, dhak, and kumkum. It exclusively showcases unsigned artists from the former Yugoslavia.	
Groovefest	2016–present	Punta Cana, Dominican Republic	Festival at The Holiday Place.	
Magnifique	2016– present	George, Washington	The first event featured headliners like Kaskade, Chromeo and Duke Dumont.	
Minus Zero Festival	2016–present	Stratton Mountain, Vermont	The first event featured performances by Deadmau5 and Kaskade.	
Shaky Beats Music Festival	2016–present	Atlanta, Georgia	First ever event featured headliners Major Lazer, Odesza, and Big Gigantic.	
Elements Music & Arts Festival	2017–Present	Long Pond, Pennsylvania	Produced by BangOnNYC! In 2017, it launched as a 3-day camping festival in Lakewood, PA. Returning every year, with a hiatus in 2020 due to the COVID-19 pandemic. In 2022, the festival was relocated to the Pocono Raceway in Long Pond, PA. Considered a “transformational festival”, the festival is a mix of music, art, and performance.	
Afterhills Music & Arts Festival	2017–present	Iași, Romania	A total of 74,000 people attended the first event, which featured ALB, Bob Sinclar, Sander van Doorn, Maurice West, Moguai, Vini Vici, W&W, Andrew Rayel, Technasia, Juicy M, Khomha, Cristian Varela, Ilario Alicante, and Marco Bailey.	
FNY Festival	2017–present	Munich, Germany	A ten-day electronic dance music festival on the grounds of the abandoned former Pfanni factory site. The first event included DJs and acts such as Marshall Jefferson, Seth Troxler, Sascha Funke, Tobi Neumann, Martin Buttrich, Erobique, Danny Daze, Lawrence, Sven Dohse, and Robert Dietz.	
Lost Lands	2017–present	Legend Valley, Thornville, Ohio	A three-day electronic dance music festival founded by dubstep artist Excision. The first event included DJs and acts such as Excision, Zeds Dead, 12th Planet, Illenium, Kill The Noise, Rezz, Barely Alive, Dion Timmer, Downlink, Figure, Space Laces, Virtual Riot, The Frim, Sullivan King, and Datsik. The second event was held 14–16 September 2018. A third event is scheduled for 27–29 September 2019.	
Festival 84	2018–present	Jahorina, Bosnia and Herzegovina	A four-day electronic dance music festival on Mt. Jahorina, which is part of the Sarajevo Olympic mountain range. The first event included DJs and acts such as Sigma, Asian Dub Foundation, Joris Voorn, Umek, Burak Yeter, Mahmut Orhan, Eric Cloutier, Patrice Baumel, After Affair, and Filatov & Karas.	
Kala Festival	2018–present	Dhermi, Albania	A week long boutique festival along the Albanian Riviera featuring London-based electronic musicians.	
ValhallaFest	2018–present	Terrace, British Columbia	An electronic dance music festival.	
UNUM Festival	2019–present	Shengjin, Albania	First festival of its kind in the Albanian Adriatic coast featuring 3 different stages along the Rana Hedhun coastal dune with DJs from around Europe and wellness sessions.	
Scream Or Dance	2022–present	Jakarta, Indonesia	Scream Or Dance, or SOD is Indonesia's largest annual Halloween-themed electronic dance music festival, also considered one of the largest Halloween electronic dance music in South East Asia, blending a concept for high-energy dance music with immersive horror and theatrical experiences. The festival itself is traditionally held near the end of the weekend of October, near 31st Halloween or early weekend of November.	
Unity Electro Fest	2022–present	Quebec City, Quebec	The first EDM festival in Quebec City. The 3-day event takes place every year in September in the Charlesbourg area.	
Doof in the Park	2025–present	Dundee, Scotland	A one-day festival hosted by Hannah Laing at Camperdown Park in Dundee, Scotland.	
Igloofest (Gatineau)	2025–present	Gatineau, Quebec	An annual EDM festival held for 3 days in February, curated by the Montreal Igloofest.	

== See also ==
- List of music festivals
  - List of electronic dance music festivals
  - List of music festivals in the United Kingdom#Dance & Electronic
- Live PA
- Timeline of electronic music genres
- Second Summer of Love
