= White Wonderland =

Music festival

- Genre: Dance music, Electronic dance music
- Dates: December 31 (New Year's Eve)
- Location: Anaheim, California
- Years active: 2011-2014
- Founders: Insomniac Events, Giant
- Website: Official website

White Wonderland is an electronic music festival co-organized by club promoters Insomniac Events and Giant.

The inaugural event took place on New Year's Eve in 2011. It was founded after Insomniac cut ties with Together as One.

== History ==
From 1999 to 2011, Insomniac had partnered with Go Ventures to organize Together as One, an annual festival historically held on New Year's Eve at the Los Angeles Memorial Sports Arena. Shortly prior to the 2011 event, Insomniac founder Pasquale Rotella announced that they would no longer co-produce Together as One, due to "various issues" surrounding Go Ventures' commitments to "safety, production quality and the overall value of our fans' experience." Rotella also felt that there were conflicts between his creative visions and those of Go Ventures' Reza Gerami.

At the same time, Rotella announced that Insomniac would partner with the club promoter Giant to form a new, competing New Year's Eve event known as White Wonderland, a two-night festival which would be held at the Anaheim Convention Center on December 31, 2011 and January 1, 2012. Similarly to Montreal's Bal en Blanc festival and the Sensation White tour, the winter-themed event would require all of its attendees to wear white-colored clothing. Despite the break-up, Together as One would still be held for 2011–12, organized solely by Go Ventures. However, the following year's edition would ultimately be cancelled.

== Editions ==
The inaugural 2011–12 edition of White Wonderland was a two-night event, headlined by Benny Benassi, Dada Life, Paul Van Dyk, and Steve Angello of Swedish House Mafia. The event concluded with a total of 24,000 attendees across both nights, with Saturday night hosting a sell-out crowd of 14,000 attendees.

The 2012–13 edition would be reduced to a one-night event on New Year's Eve, and featured performances by Above & Beyond, Avicii, Bingo Players, Dash Berlin, Dannic, Ferry Corsten, Hardwell, Madeon, Sebastian Ingrosso, and Tritonal.

Insomniac announced the 2013-14 lineup on November 24, 2013, featuring ATB, Congorock, Cosmic Gate, Dash Berlin, Laidback Luke, and Steve Angello. The 2014-15 edition was headlined by Armin van Buuren, Laidback Luke, Showtek, and W&W.

== See also ==
- List of electronic music festivals
