= Every Picture Tells a Story (disambiguation) =

Every Picture Tells a Story is a 1971 album by Rod Stewart.

Every Picture Tells a Story may also refer to:

- Every Picture Tells a Story (event), a series of all-night electronic dance music festivals in Melbourne
- Every Picture Tells a Story (song), a song by Rod Stewart from the album of the same name
- Every Picture Tells a Story (8 Simple Rules episode), an episode of the American sitcom comedy television show
