= Secondfest =

Music festival

- Genre: Electronic music, rock music, etc.
- Location: Online
- Years active: 2007
- Founders: Second Life

Secondfest is a music festival which takes place in the Second Life virtual world. Unlike other musical performances on the web which provide audio through individual web pages for listeners to enjoy by themselves, Secondfest offers an on-line community the ability to experience entertainment together, in a large virtual space.

The first Secondfest event was aired in June 2007 and was favorably received by the artists and Second Life users alike. The festival was conceived and produced by the company Rivers Run Red - the metaverse development agency based in London (directed by Justin Bovington) and Sara Linfoot (head of digital partnerships) and Sarah Ellison (head of events) at The Guardian and curated by Sav Remzi of Tirk Records. The event was sponsored by Intel, with an emphasis on the 'power within' This, the first on-line festival of its type, featured artists and arenas from the UK festival circuit. Secondfest was subsequently awarded the AOP (Association of Online Publishers) prize for the 'Innovation' category and The Guardian Achievement Award for 'Innovation in advertising'.

== Day one ==
Artists that performed on day one included:

- Toby Tobias
- Glimmer Twins
- Greg Wilson
- Groove Armada's Tom Findlay

== Day two ==
Day two, making use of four 'stages', included the following artists:

- Hot Chip
- The Cinematic Orchestra
- Gilles Peterson
- New Young Pony Club
- The Aliens
- Hexstatic
- Coldcut

== Other ==
Other real world artists who performed include:

- Pet Shop Boys
- Hadouken!
- Florence and the Machine
- Rob da Bank

In-universe bands also played:

- Strangefates
- DJ Jenns
- DJ Doubledown Tandino
- Slim Warrior

Also billed to 'appear' were:

- Simian Mobile Disco
- Digitalism
- The Knife

As well as the four stages, the festival site included a cinema, private beach party, games, roller skating, food court, bar, deer rides and walk on map.

== See also ==
- List of electronic music festivals
- Live electronic music
