= Real Bad =

- Genre: Electronic music
- Location: San Francisco, California
- Years active: 1989–2019, 2021-
- Founders: Grass Roots Gay Rights Foundation (formerly: Grass Roots Gay Rights/West)
- Website: www.realbad.org

Real Bad is the name of a fundraising party held annually in San Francisco, California, immediately following the Folsom Street Fair. The party, which occurs on the last Sunday in September, has been in existence since 1989. It is thrown by a non-profit organization called Grass Roots Gay Rights West (GRGR/West). Most of the money raised by the event comes from ticket sales, which are generated by a network of party hosts who sell tickets to friends. Proceeds from the party go to HIV/AIDS charities and LGBT health and community service organizations. In 2007, the party raised $150,000 for San Francisco Bay Area charities.

Because it serves as an unofficial closing event for Folsom Street Fair weekend, the party has a leather and BDSM bent.

There was no party in 2020.

== See also ==
- List of electronic music festivals
