= Soundscape (New Zealand festival) =

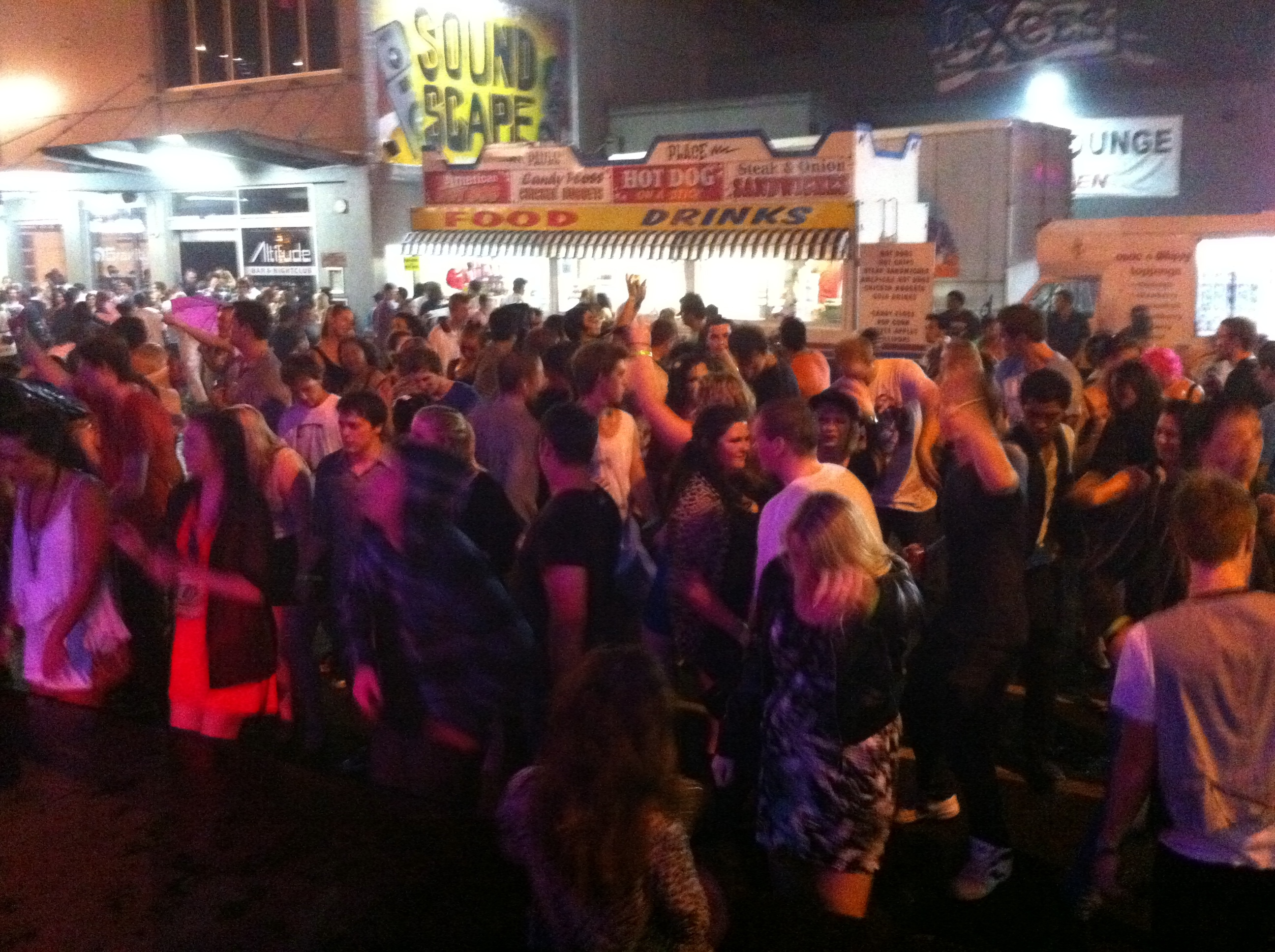
- Outdoor Stage, Soundscape February 2011
- Genre: Electronic Dance Music, Dubstep, Hard house, Drum and bass, Rock, Hip hop
- Dates: March and July
- Location: Hamilton, New Zealand
- Years active: 2010 - 2014
- Founders: Greg Stack and James Lawless

Soundscape was a music festival in Hamilton, New Zealand, held during Orientation week of University of Waikato from 2010 to 2014. The event saw a section of Alexandra Street closed off, with up to seven stages in the surrounding nightclubs and on the street. Although the event predominantly featured electronic dance music, the 2011 festivals have featured live rock, reggae and hip hop.

The first Soundscape featured three stages of electronic music: Club Classics, Dirty Electric and Destructive Dub. The July 2010 festival expanded to five stages across four Hamilton central city nightclubs. The March 2011 Soundscape was the first to feature live music and international acts, which over 4000 people attended.

In March 2012 the event increased in size, yet again, and sold out at 5,500. It featured acts including Kora, AC Slater, Carl Nicholson, Redial, Distrakt and more. In July, Greg Stack and James Lawless launched a sister event called Homestyle - which follows a similar design, albeit smaller.

Soundscape's final event ran as 'Homestyle' in 2014, 3000+ people attended.

== Artist lineups ==
Soundscape has featured DJs from around the world, including Dem Slackers, Octane & DLR, Nadisko, Distrakt, TrumpDisco and Jody6, Steve Hill, Carl Nicholson as well as established New Zealand music acts like Tiki Taane and Cornerstone Roots. The event has featured many local Hamilton bands and DJs.

== See also ==
- List of electronic music festivals
- Live electronic music
