= Hartera =

Annual music festival in Croatia

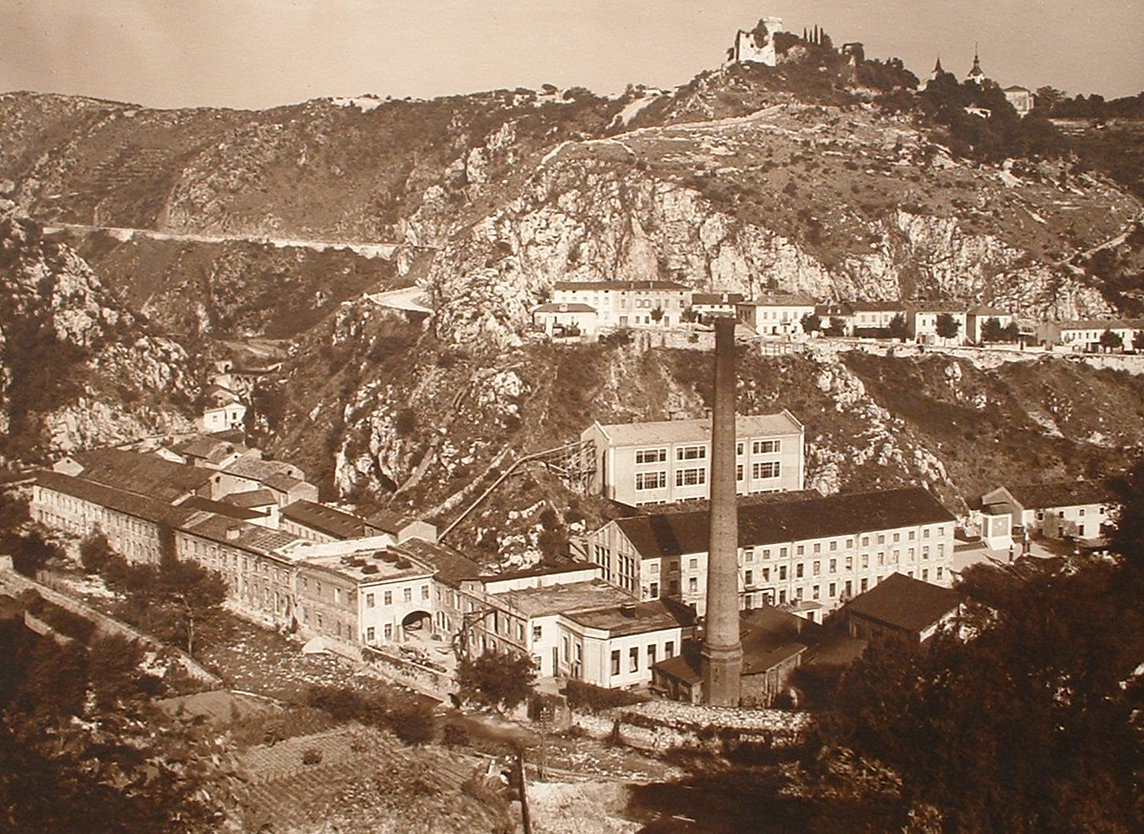
- Genre: House music, Indie rock, Electronic dance
- Dates: June or July
- Locations: Rijeka, Croatia
- Years active: 2005 – present
- Website: http://www.hartera.com/

Hartera is an annual electronica music festival held in Rijeka, Croatia. The name derives from the festivals location, an old paper factory (which was one of the largest in Europe) that functioned for 150 years before shutting down. One of the original purposes of the Hartera Festival was to preserve the old building by converting it into a public gathering for cultural purposes.

== See also ==
- List of electronic music festivals
