= Ricochet Gathering =

- Genre: Electronic music,
- Dates: 2000-present
- Locations: Okefenokee Swamp, various
- Years active: 2000-?
- Capacity: Ricochet Gathering

Ricochet Gathering is a collaboration event for electronic music. The name applies both to the event and to the group of musicians involved in the event, where a group of musicians and a usually small group of fans gather at locations around the world. The event takes place approximately once each calendar year; the first gathering was held at the Okefenokee Swamp in April 2000. Each gathering event has a theme tied to the Berlin School of electronic music pioneers Tangerine Dream. The Ricochet Dream Web site has been replaced by "Site Under Construction" since 2016.

== Electronic music and beyond. ==
The type of music that is created at these event varies from old-style retro Berlin School to new contemporary electronic music (EM). Musicians and fans usually have to make an effort to reach the exotic locations. Once there, the setting and atmosphere allow fans and musicians to live in a communal setting for a few days (usually a week) to make and listen to electronic music. All music created at each event is live, unrehearsed, improvised, and captured in one take.

== Chronology of music events ==
- Okefenokee 2000 (Okefenokee Swamp, Georgia, USA)
- Okefenokee 2001 (Okefenokee Swamp, Georgia, USA)
- Okefenokee 2002 (Okefenokee Swamp, Georgia, USA)
- Mojave 2003 (Mojave Desert, Nipton, California, USA)
- Poland 2004 (Jelenia Góra / Szałas Muflon / Wrocław, Poland)
- Gomera 2005 (La Gomera Island, Canary Islands, Spain)
- Rubycon 2006 (Tuscany / Rubicon, Italy)
- Yellowstone 2007 (Bozeman, Montana / Yellowstone, Wyoming, USA)
- Romania 2008 (Transylvania, Carpathian Mountains, Romania)
- Croatia 2009 (Vinišće, Dalmatia, Croatia)
- Berlin 2010 (Berlin, Germany - 40th Anniversary of Berlin School EM)
- Siberia 2011 (Trans-Siberian Railway, Russia (Soundtrack with artist Wolfram Spyra)).

The music at and by the Ricochet Gathering is recorded and eventually published by the Ricochet Dream music label, which is dedicated to releasing music from this event and its associated musicians. Vic Rek has been the producer of these events, the music being released on his Ricochet Dream EM label. He also coined the term "Electronic Woodstock" when he was preparing for the Poland 2004 event, even though the published slogan was "Elektronika u Rolnika", which means "Electronics at the Farm" in Polish. Complete details about the Ricochet Gathering music and releases are cataloged in the Discogs music database.

== See also ==
- List of electronic music festivals
- Live electronic music
