= Wintercase =

- Genre: Electronic music, electro, minimal, dub, and drum and bass
- Locations: Palermo, Italy
- Years active: ?-present
- Founders: Alcapone Records; Mira Communication
- Website: WintercasePalermo.com

Wintercase is an international festival of electronic music which takes place in clubs in Palermo, Italy. It is designed and produced by Alcapone Records and Mira Communication.

== Overview ==
The festival includes a variety of styles which fall under the genre of electronic music, such as electro, minimal, dub, and drum and bass.

The festival also includes an educational cultural section called the WiLAB, which is designed to educate the public on the subject of electronic arts and their applications in music, visual arts, video art, and photography. WiLAB engages in academic and institutional collaborations with entities such as Studio Azzurro (Milan), the University of Palermo, LUM (Laboratorio Universitario del Mediterraneo), and Antithesis (Palermo).

The 2010 edition provided a structured program of workshops, lectures, classes, and concerts.

== See also ==
- List of electronic music festivals
- Live electronic music
