= Soundwave Festival (San Francisco) =

Soundwave Biennial Festival
- Genre: Electronic music, art
- Dates: Every two years for two months
- Locations: San Francisco, California
- Years active: 2004-present
- Founders: MEDIATE Art Group
- Website: Soundwave Festival site

Soundwave Biennial Festival (formerly called the Soundwave Series) is a sound, art, and music festival that happens every two years for two months in San Francisco.

== Overview ==
Soundwave is produced by the 501(c)3 non-profit Mediate Art Group. The festival features diverse local and international multimedia artists working with sound including noise artists, sound artists, improvisers, experimental musicians, composers, avant-garde musicians, vocalists, electroacoustic musicians, classical musicians and rock musicians. The festival focuses on new and unusual performances and art works, often in untraditional environments. Soundwave primarily showcases "sound art," but also explores disciplines such as media art, performance art, music, dance, and installation.

== Artists ==
Soundwave created the well-received AudioBus series conceived by Soundwave founder and artistic director Alan So for its third season MOVE SOUND in 2008. It featured Bay Area singer Goh Nakamura, avant-cellist Zoe Keating, Odessa Chen and [ruidobello] and David Graves.

Other noted artists and musicians that have created performances at Soundwave include: Moe! Staiano (Moe!Kestra!), Andrea Polli, Matt Davignon, Diana Burgoyne, (Rob Reger (Beno+Minnie with Aimee Friberg), Dana Gumbiner (of Deathray under electronic name Night Night), Danny Grody (of Tarentel performing with band The Drift) and Neal Morgan (of Joanna Newsom's Y Street Band and Golden Shoulders)

Soundwave was awarded "Best Sound Sculptures – Future Classic" by the editors of San Francisco Magazine in their Best of 2007 issue while being compared to San Francisco's Audium (Theater).

== Soundwave seasons ==
Soundwave has had nine seasons: FREE SOUND 2004, SURROUND SOUND 2006 (curator and show featured by SPARK* on KQED-PBS), MOVE SOUND 2008 which included amplified skateboarding, sound drawing, holographic movies. ME'DI.ATE's fourth Soundwave season GREEN SOUND 2010 included performances in historic WWII Bunkers, churches, city streets and parks, and an artist-imagined environment Illuminated Forest. Its fifth season Soundwave HUMANITIES 2012 has been called epic, glorious and with distinct and daring artists. Season six explored WATER in 2014 in the midst of a California drought. The seventh season ARCHITECTURE occurred in 2016 exploring the rapid transformation of San Francisco's changing cityscapes and its implications. Its eight season in 2018 is INFRASTRUCTURE exploring Bay Area and global networks provoking ideas around isolation amid interconnectivity; environmental degradation and mass consumption of electronics; the politics of energy infrastructures, fossil fuels and renewables; the movement of goods and services across roads, bridges, railways, channels and ports; the often invisible protocols that affect our daily lives. TIME in 2019 arrived a year early, apropros for the medium and explored the histories of the past and possibilities for the future.

Soundwave evolved into Soundwave NEXT in 2020, but COVID had organizers reimagine events into live streamed performances on Twitch. 2021-2023 the pandemic ushered in ideas of innovative ulterior sonic experiences that negated the need for gatherings: From playlists to Translocality soundwalks enabled by the Echoes app to New Art City virtual sonic art space.

== Locations ==
Soundwave events have occurred in galleries, museums, and unusual and iconic locations in and around San Francisco. They have included:

- Grace Cathedral
- California Academy of Sciences
- de Young Museum
- Legion of Honor
- Battery Townsley
- San Francisco Zen Center
- California College of the Arts
- San Francisco Art Institute
- Dolby Cinema
- SPUR
- The Exploratorium
- Yerba Buena Gardens
- Civic Center Plaza
- Ocean Beach
- The Lab
- Alterspace
- Contemporary Jewish Museum
- Gray Area Foundation for the Arts
- Intersection for the Arts
- Bonsai Garden at Lake Merritt
- SomArts
- St. Mark's Lutheran Church
- ARUP

== See also ==
- List of electronic music festivals
- Experimental rock
