= Isotopia Festival =

Electronic music, art and lifestyle festival

Coordinates: 13°07′02.16″S 130°48′36.30″E

- Isotopia Logo
- Genre: Electronic music, art, lifestyle
- Locations: Northern Territory, Australia
- Years active: 2006 - 2009
- Website: Official website

The Isotopia Festival (Isotopia Music Festival or Isotopia Eclipse Music Festival) was an annual electronic music, art and lifestyle festival that took place between 2006 and 2009 in Northern Territory, Australia. It featured a program that included environmental speakers, forums, films, local bands, DJs and several workshops.

The inaugural festival occurred from 9 to 12 June 2006, near Darwin. One of the main goals of the festival was to raise awareness against Australian nuclearisation. The name Isotopia came from the fusion of the words Isotope and Utopia.

Although the festival was largely influenced by electronic music it had in its line-up a variety of different music genres including hip hop, Reggae, dub, Psytrance, funk, and jungle.

The 2008 edition of the festival took place at Woolaning Indigenous Community located within Litchfield National Park 160 km south of Darwin and was spread over three days, co-inciding with a partial lunar eclipse. The final edition ran from 3 to 6 July 2009 at the same location.

== See also ==
- List of electronic music festivals
- Live electronic music
