= Moonpark =

Argentine music festival

- Genre: Progressive House, House, Techno, Tech-house, Eurodance, Electronic music, Indie rock, Dance, Electropop, World music.
- Dates: March, June and December
- Locations: Buenos Aires, Argentina
- Years active: 2003 - present

Moonpark is an Argentine music festival, held three times annually since 2003. It is held in the Northeast of Buenos Aires city. It is considered one of the most important dance and electronic music festivals in the country.

Some of the acts performed during its last editions included Nick Warren, John Digweed, Sasha, Hernán Cattáneo, Satoshi Tomiie, Danny Howells, Carl Cox, Steve Lawler, Danny Tenaglia, James Zabiela, S.O.S., Luke Fair, Richie Hawtin and Loco Dice.

== See also ==
- List of electronic music festivals
- Live electronic music
- List of music festivals in Argentina
