= UltraMar Festival =

- Genre: Electronic dance music, house music, trance music
- Location: Cartagena, Colombia
- Years active: 2004–10, 2012–13

The UltraMar Festival was an annual electronic music festival held in Cartagena, Colombia. It took place during the first week of January from 2004 until 2013, with the exception of 2011.

== History ==
The first UltraMar festival was held between 2–4 January 2004 in the Convention Center of Cartagena, Colombia. Among the international DJs participating in the first festival were Italians Mauro Picotto, Joy Kitikoni and Marco Carola, the Hungarian Corvin Dalek and British DJ Pete Tong, playing alongside twelve Colombian DJs. From 2005 onwards the festival played in a different location in Cartagena each night. Among the 130 international artists who participated in the festival over the years were Armin Van Buuren, David Guetta, Tiesto, Paul Van Dyk, Ferry Corsten, Roger Sanchez, Sasha, Deep Dish, Richie Hawtin and Axwell. In 2008, the UltraMar Festival joined with Summer Dance Festival, another dance festival that had been taking place in the same week in Cartagena since 2006, to create the Ultra-Summer Festival.

With the growing popularity of UltraMar and other dance festivals in Cartagena, problems started to surface regarding noise pollution and policing of the event. The 2011 UltraMar Festival was canceled at short notice after the organizers were unable to obtain the necessary permission from the local authorities and the Convention Center where the event was to be held. Tickets for the event were sold before a deal with the site had been reached, and were later reimbursed. UltraMar returned in 2012 and 2013, but faced more obstacles: the 2012 event was moved out of Cartagena to the beach of Manzanillo del Mar north of the city, and then in 2013 it was moved again at the last moment to Punta Canoa, another beach even further away, following complaints from residents about noise and delinquent behavior. The logistical difficulties faced in putting on the 2013 festival and the competition from the rival Summerland (now Storyland) Festival resulted in the organizers deciding to discontinue UltraMar.

== See also ==
- List of electronic music festivals
