= Eclipse Festival =

- Genre: Electronic dance music, performance art
- Dates: summer
- Locations: Quebec, Canada
- Years active: 1999– present
- Website: Eclipse Festival

Eclipse Festival is an electronic music festival held in Quebec, Canada during the summer. Biennial (on even years, with the exception of a 2017 edition), this festival is a weekend-long international gathering of visual and musical art. It features a symbiosis of dance, open philosophies, performance art, human (and spiritual) experiences.

== History ==
The first edition of the Eclipse Festival was an indoor party that happened in Montreal in the end of April of the year 1999. After two years of absence, they came back in September 2002, with another indoor party. The festival has been happening every year since then, inviting electronic music producers and DJs from all over the world.

The 2003 edition of the Eclipse Festival happened in the outdoors near Mont-Tremblant, Quebec. People were invited to bring their tents and camp there. Since that year, the festival officially became an outdoor festival. The 2004 edition was held in Ste-Agathe, Quebec. In 2005 they moved the location to Ste-Therese-de-la-Gatineau, which is a lot farther from the big cities, but which is also a bigger place with big open fields and a beach on the river. They used the same location for all the other events after that, except in 2007, when the festival happened at the ecovillage at Mont-Radar and in 2014, when it happened at Awacamenj‐Mino Camp in Wakefield.

== See also ==
- List of electronic music festivals
