= Karnataka video clip controversy =

Political scandal in India

2012 Karnataka video clip controversy
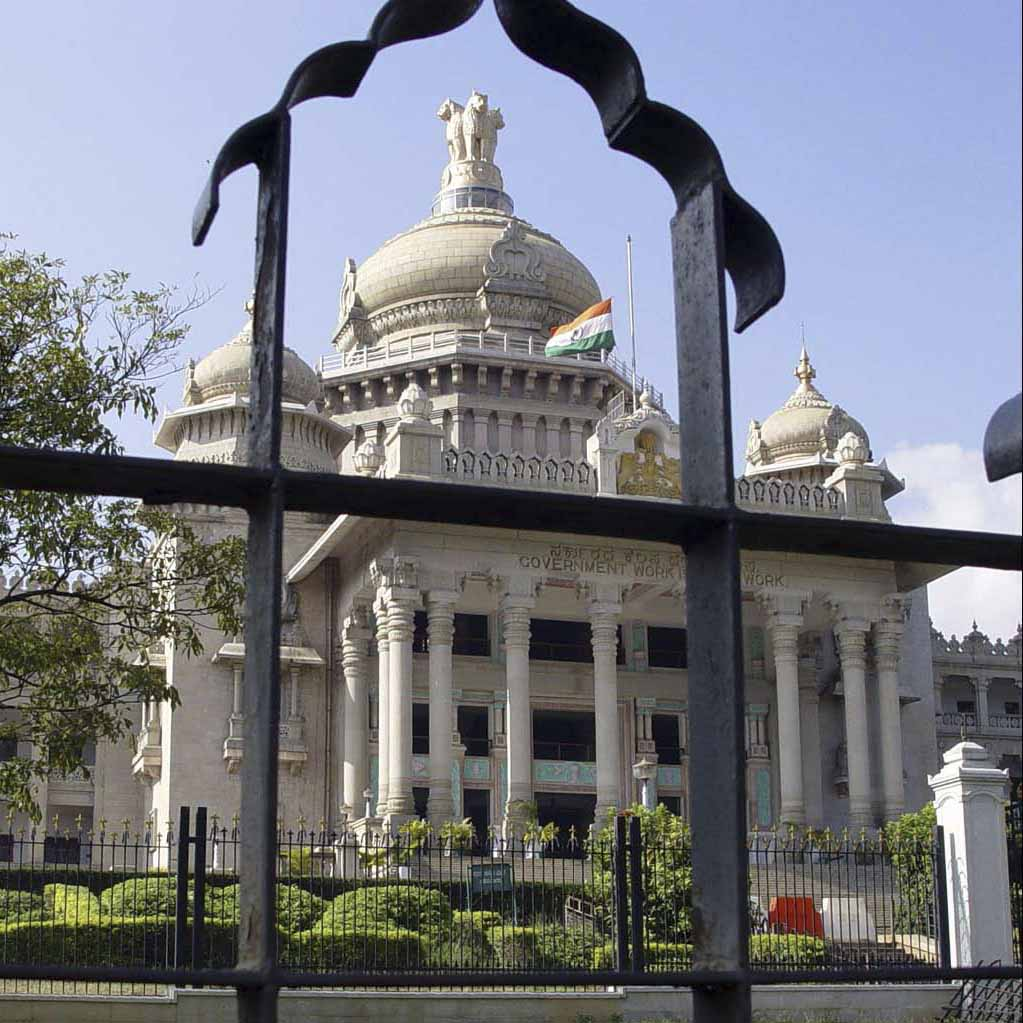
- Vidhana Soudha
- Location: Karnataka Legislative Assembly, Vidhana Soudha
- Also known as: Porngate
- Filmed by: Local media
- Participants: Bhartiya Janata Party, Indian National Congress, Janata Dal (Secular)
- Outcome: Resignation from ministerial berths
- Inquest: Constitution of six-member Special House Committee to probe allegations
- Charges: BJP MLAs accusedof watching an obscene film while the house was in session

The 2012 Karnataka video clip controversy, also referred to as Porngate, was a controversy in the Karnataka Legislative Assembly where two ministers of the state cabinet resigned over claims of inappropriate conduct. It is alleged that they viewed a pornographic video on a mobile device while the legislature was in session.

== Incident ==
In February 2012, Spring Zouk, an international festival described as a rave party, was attended by mostly foreign tourists at Udupi beach on at St Mary's Islands. The event is coordinated to increase tourism. At this rave, a video of tourists at the event having sex in public was created and the viewing of this video became the subject of controversy.

At a session of the Karnataka Legislative Assembly, a camera showed two cabinet ministers, J. Krishna Palemar, Laxman Savadi and C C Patil, allegedly watching pornographic clips on a mobile phone. The ministers said that the video was an investigation of the behavior of foreign tourists at the party on St. Mary's Islands, who were having sex in public and consuming drugs and alcohol at the rave organised by the state tourism department and others.

== Reactions ==
=== Political ===
On 8 February, all ministers offered resignation letters and the party accepted their resignations. Former Karnataka chief minister and BJP party leader B. S. Yeddyurappa reprimanded all officials for their behavior. Anna Hazare called for their imprisonment.

=== Media ===
An Indian news source claimed that the international media attention of the event was on how the members of the party who were caught viewing the video were in a party which was especially condemning of this sort of behavior.

The public sought information about this event using Facebook, Twitter, and YouTube. The hashtag "#porngate" was a top trending word on 8 February 2012 on social media site Twitter.

=== Social ===
The All India Democratic Women's Association issued a statement that "the anti-women mindset of the former women and child development minister C C Patil, who has been a vocal advocate of dress codes for women, has been thoroughly exposed. The BJP is answerable for justifying and defending hypocrites who indulge in moral policing, while themselves violating all norms of decent behaviour."

== See also ==
- Neil Parish, a British politician involved in a similar scandal
