= Wave Sound (festival) =

Italian electronic music festival

- Genre: Electronic music, EDM
- Dates: First weekend of September
- Locations: Bogliasco, Italy
- Years active: 2009–present
- Founders: Sunset Staff Genova

Wave Sound is an electronic music festival held on the beach of Bogliasco, 11 kilometers southeast of Genova, and has been organized since 2009.

== See also ==
- List of electronic music festivals
- Live electronic music
