= Konemetsä =

Electronic music festival in Finland

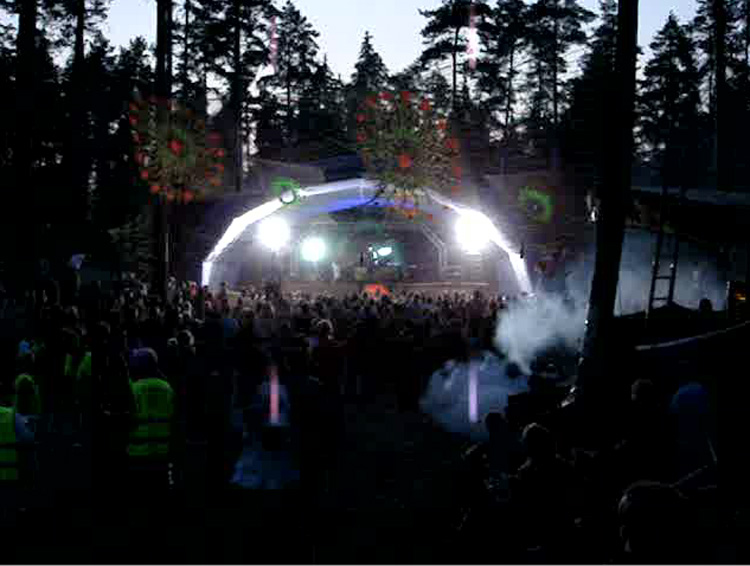
- Konemetsä main stage, year 2006
- Genre: Electronic music
- Dates: 2004-2009
- Location: Finland

Konemetsä - Open Air Forest Festival is an electronic music festival held in South West of Finland in the village of Ollila in Marttila county. The festival have always been arranged in July. The characteristic aspect of the festival is that the music is played continuously 24 hours / day. Other characteristic aspects are that the Main Stage is in the middle of a forest surrounded by a natural amphitheatre. A very Finnish thing has been a 24/7 Finnish Sauna during the event, it has been popular.

== History ==
The festival was first held in 2004 and it attracted some 600 daily visitors (Total visitors 1800). In 2005 the attendance grew to 1200 daily (Total 3600). The 3rd Konemetsä in 2006 had about 2000 daily participants (Total 6000). The so far largest partaking was seen in 2007 when the festival attracted 3200 (Total 9600) electronic music, arts and culture fans. In 2008 the attendance was 3000 daily (Total 9000). In 2009 the event became a four-day festival instead of earlier three and there was about 2000 daily enthusiastic party people (Total 8000). The festival will not be arranged in 2010 but will be back in action in 2011.

During the years 2004 - 2009 it has presented an eminent line-up year after year. Here are some of the artists that have been on stage at Konemetsä - Open Air.

Deadmau5, Koxbox, Eat Static, GMS, Astrix, Ticon, Orkidea, Proteus, Ott, Far Too Loud, Tristan, Laughing Buddha, Raja Ram, Miles Dyson, Texas Faggott, Haltya, Carbon Based, Ephexis...

Konemetsä is based on Peace, Love, Unity and Respect. It has always been an independent event and will always stay that way according to the organizers. Unfortunately the police authorities have taken the role of the main artist during 2008–2009. Their action has made this festival a scapegoat of the challenges that are commonly faced in modern society and youth culture. No one has ever been arrested due to any reasons in Konemetsä. There has been zero violence during all years. Minor recreational drug possessions have been found by the authorities which has legitimated their hunt. Due to its independent and non-political status, the festival is very vulnerable against attacks made by both hostile authority- and hostile media publicity. Konemetsä is not the first electronic music event in Finland that is in the teeth of the power agencies. The organizers wish that critical thinking is becoming more and more popular and while prejudice promoting publicity still try to sell there would be fewer buyers on the market.

In 2008 Konemetsä won the title "Best Event of the Year", issued by Basso. It has become the most attended electronic music event in Scandinavia.

== See also ==
- List of electronic music festivals
