= Forestland (festival) =

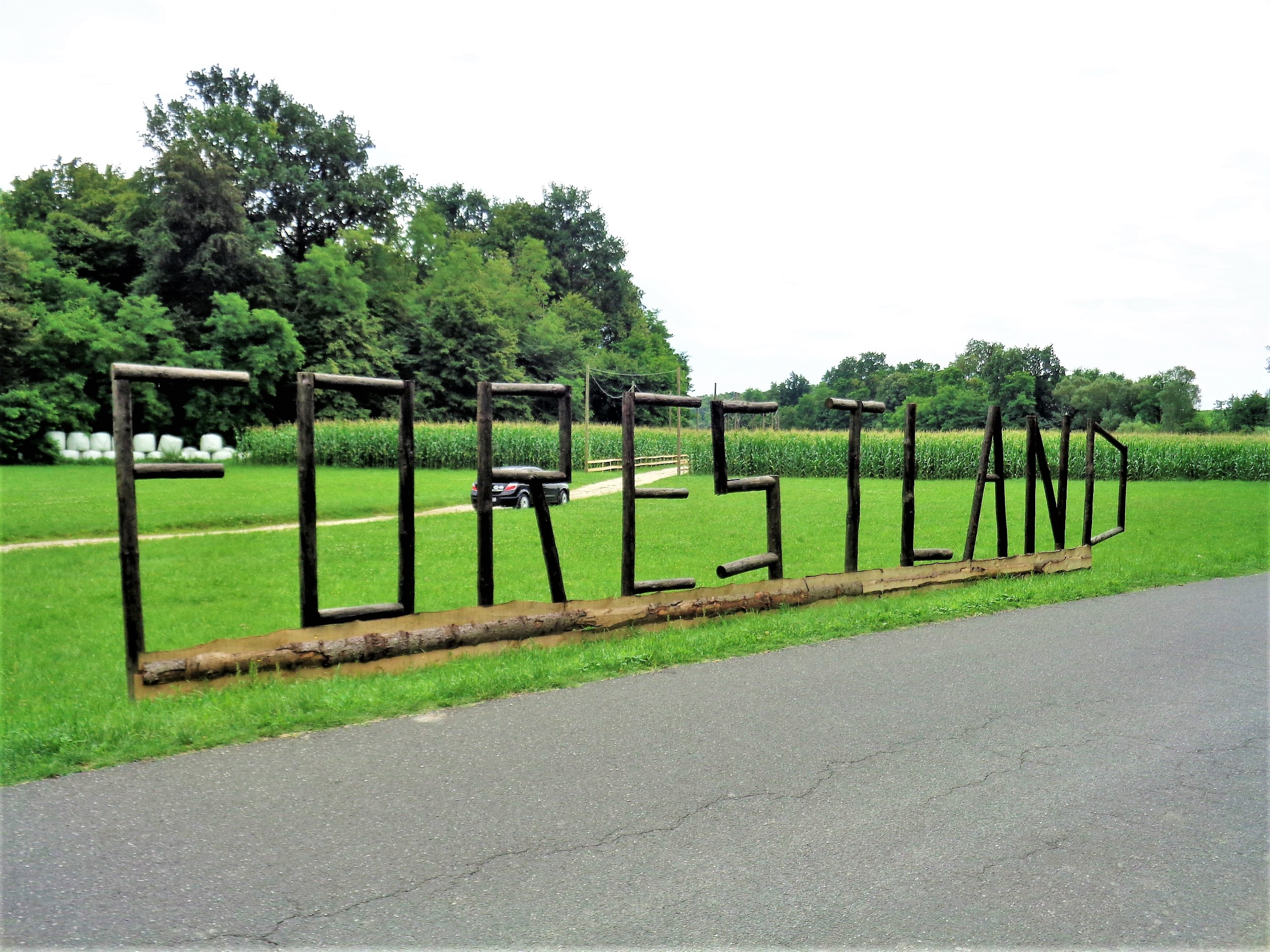
- Genre: Electronic music
- Locations: Međimurje County, Croatia
- Years active: 2013-2025
- Website: forestland.hr

Forestland was an electronic dance music festival that took place in Međimurje County, Croatia. It was one of Croatia's most popular electronic music events.

== See also ==
- List of electronic music festivals
- Live electronic music
