= Amber Beach Festival =

Annual music festival in Russia

Amber Beach Янтарный пляж
- Genre: Electronic music
- Locations: Kaliningrad Oblast, Russia
- Years active: 2010 – 2016

Amber Beach (Russian: Янтарный Пляж, romanized: Yantarny Plyazh) was an annual music festival in Kaliningrad Oblast, Russia.

== Renditions ==
=== 2010 ===
The first festival was held in Yantarny from July 23 to 25, 2010. It was headlined by Everything Is Made In China, Vopli Vidoplyasova, Dieselboy, Covenant and Timo Maas. The event was attended by about 3000–4000 people.

=== 2011 ===
In 2011, the festival was held in Zelenogradsk on July 15 to 16. The headliners were Paul Oakenfold, SASH! and Smash HI-FI. There were about 5000 attendees.

=== 2012 ===
In 2012, the festival was held in Zelenogradsk on July 13 to 14. The headliners were Scooter, Ronski Speed, and Tantsy Minus.

=== 2013 ===
In 2013, the festival was held in Zelenogradsk on August 30. The headliners were Westbam and Solarstone.

=== 2014-2015 ===
The festival was canceled in 2014 and was not held 2015.

=== 2016 ===
In 2016, the festival returned to Yantarny and took place from July 28 to July 31. The headliners were Gus Gus, Enter Shikari, and Brainstorm.

== See also ==
- List of electronic music festivals
- Live electronic music
