= Bang Face =

Electronic dance music event in the United Kingdom

- Genre: Electronic music
- Location: United Kingdom Netherlands Belgium
- Years active: 2003–present
- Founders: James Gurney aka Saint Acid
- Website: Official website

Bang Face (sometimes written as Bangface) is an electronic dance music event that has been taking place at various venues across the UK and Europe since 2003. Referring to itself as a Neo-Rave Explosion, Beatport announced on 18 April 2024 that its newest genre was Neo Rave - "Coined by BangFace, Neo Rave encompasses the harder styles of dance music". Starting as a monthly club night in London, it has grown to include an annual weekender, a boat party on the River Thames, as well as guest shows at festivals such as Glastonbury. In 2013 Bang Face celebrated its 10th birthday with DJ Mag stating Bang Face [maintains] "the perfect blend of old skool rave and the finest contemporary leftfield sounds". In March 2015 Bang Face reached the milestone of 100 events by hosting the Weekender at Southport Holiday Park. Resident Advisor asked the question "Is Bangface the most unique rave out there?" and described it as a "Neo-rave utopia". In 2023 Bang Face celebrated 20 years of events with the 2023 Weekender headlined by Orbital.

== Description ==
Bang Face is known for its party atmosphere featuring inflatables being bounced above the crowd, banners bearing comedic slogans, and fancy dress themes. A photo feature illustrating this appeared in the Observer Magazine. It is this atmosphere that has become Bang Face’s signature with Time Out London claiming that the 2009 Weekender would “make Bestival look like f***ing ‘Question Time’". Bang Face hosts a range of electronic dance music.

Bang Face themes its events using historical references. Rolling Stone magazine commented on the 2024 theme, “Such off-the-wall ridiculousness runs through the blood of Bangface: owing to the ‘Bangus Maximus’-theme, this year’s opening party commences with an on-stage Gladiator-style duel that sees one rave champion crowned and then make their way through the crowd on a ginormous Trojan horse.”

== London events ==
Bang Face began as a monthly club night in London and quickly became increasing popular with a resurgence in electronic dance music. Event organiser, James Gurney, was interviewed by The New York Times in 2007 and said the dance-music scene has been “snowballing” and the crowd is “getting younger and younger.” It gained attention early on with a video endorsement from Ozzy Osbourne who described it as "the Punk Rave Place". Whilst supporting mainly new and upcoming artists, Bang Face began to gain attention in the media. It appeared top of the recommended club features in publications such as NME’s ‘Top clubs to get your rocks off’ and The Guardian Guide: “Bang Face celebrates with luminaries Venetian Snares, A Guy Called Gerald and Hellfish to unleash all manner of mayhem”. Timeout said “There’s a line most club nights stop at, for fear of being too silly. Bangface crossed that line on its very first night, and hasn’t looked back since. What started in 2003 as a one-off party has become a cultish hub for London's ravers.” Bang Face also holds an annual boat party on the River Thames.

== Weekenders ==
After five years of monthly club nights, Bang Face launched the first Weekender in 2008, held over three days at Pontins in Camber Sands. Following the success of this event it has now become an annual event. A fly poster for the first Weekender appeared in Channel 4's Shameless as a stage prop. In 2012 the Bang Face Weekender was held at Trevelgue Holiday Park, Newquay, Cornwall and headlined by Aphex Twin.

The Bang Face Weekender returned in 2015 to Pontins Holiday Park Southport for the 100th event and continued there annually until 2023. Following their performance at the 2023 Weekender, Atlanta-based producer and DJ Nikki Nair said "Bang Face, oddly enough, was one of the most beautiful festivals I’ve ever attended; a celebration of rave as a culture and language, done in a very genuine and wholesome way, with no punches pulled or expense spared to make it feel like, well, the raviest possible rave."

In January 2024, Pontins in Southport closed down permanently following damage from Storm Henk. On 29 March 2024, it was announced that Bang Face Weekender 2024 would now be held at Butlins Skegness on 4-7 October.

Following the 2024 Weekender at Butlin’s Skegness, Rolling Stone magazine commented that “Bangface – the UK’s last surviving rave-cation – must be protected at all costs... Suffice to say, losing this uninhibited club-born escape from reality would have been an irredeemable travesty for British rave culture – there really is nothing else quite like it. Long live Bangface!”.

== Festivals and European events ==
Bang Face began to host showcase events at UK festivals, starting with The Glade in 2006. In 2010 it hosted a night at the Glastonbury Festival for the first time, which was ranked ninth in a Daily Telegraph columnist's Top 10 highlights of the festival. BangFace returned to Glastonbury in June 2011. In 2013 - 2014 Bang Face organised events in Belgium and Holland where they have a strong fanbase. This included a takeover at Dour Festival in 2014. In 2016 Bang Face was invited to talk at a panel at ADE (Amsterdam Dance Event). From 2017 - 2019 Bang Face held an annual event in Amsterdam, known as Amsterbang at the famous Melkweg venue. In 2019 Bang Face hosted a stage at Boomtown Festival in the UK.

== See also ==
- List of electronic music festivals
