= Bounce Festival =

The Bounce Festival
- Genre: Arts, electronic music
- Location: Plumas County, California
- Years active: 2009-present
- Founders: The Bounce, LLC and Fresh Bakin'

The Bounce Festival is a music and arts festival in the foothills of the Sierra Nevada, in Plumas County, California. Presented by The Bounce, LLC and Fresh Bakin', the two entities host a variety of music and special events year round in the Lake Tahoe, Sacramento, and Reno, NV area.

The Bounce and Fresh Bakin' producers aim to create community while blurring the lines between musical genres. Highlights include integrated Installation Art, Live Painting by local and international artists, a movement and wellness village with workshops and yoga, a variety of craft and food vendors, and a river.

== History ==
The Big Bounce debuted in Belden, CA in 2009 with headliners Bassnectar and Fort Knox Five. Event producers formulated The Bounce, LLC in 2011 and created The Bounce Festival with Fresh Bakin'. The event remained in Belden until they expanded the event to a larger private Plumas County location in 2013.

== See also ==
- List of music festivals in the United States
- List of electronic music festivals
