= Systo Palty =

Systo Palty Togathering
- Genre: Trance
- Dates: Early May
- Locations: Russia: Sisto-Palkino village (2004–2008); Lujki village (2008–present)
- Years active: 2004–present
- Website: Official website

The Systo Palty is annual open-air art music festival held near St. Petersburg, Russia.

== See also ==
- List of electronic music festivals
- Live electronic music
