= Disco Donnie Presents =

EDM event production company

Disco Donnie Presents (DDP) is an electronic dance music (EDM) event production company founded by James "Disco Donnie" Estopinal in 1994.

DDP has reportedly sold over 16 million tickets across more than 16,000 live events, arena shows, and outdoor festivals in over 100 markets across the U.S., Mexico, Canada, and Latin America. DDP organizes and promotes an estimated 1,000 club events annually in U.S. cities such as Portland, Philadelphia, Houston, Tampa, New Orleans, Dallas, and St. Louis.

== History ==
James "Disco Donnie" Estopinal, Jr. began hosting dance music parties in New Orleans in 1994, after graduating from Louisiana State University. He initially used company aliases such as Moon Patrol and Freebass Society before settling on Disco Productions, the precursor to Disco Donnie Presents. In 1995, he secured his first venue, the New Orleans State Palace Theater.

In 1997, Estopinal expanded his operations by hosting raves in Houston, Austin, Atlanta, Louisiana, and Mississippi in both legal and underground venues, including an abandoned movie theater, a six-story warehouse (rent: $1,000), and the Austin Music Hall. These events featured artists such as Frankie Bones, Paul Oakenfold, The Crystal Method, Keoki, Clint Mansell (Pop Will Eat Itself, film composer for Requiem for a Dream & Black Swan), LTJ Bukem, Derrick Carter, Freaky Chakra and Single Cell Orchestra.

In the fall of 2000, Estopinal was indicted under the federal "crack house" statute, a provision of the Anti-Drug Abuse Act of 1986, which criminalized property owners who knowingly allowed the manufacturing, distribution, or use of controlled substances on their premises. This law enabled the Justice Department to prosecute venue owners and promoters associated with rave parties. In 2001, the State Palace Theatre was fined $100,000 but was allowed to remain open, provided it banned drug paraphernalia such as glow sticks and pacifiers.

In 1999, Disco Donnie partnered with Pasquale Rotella's Insomniac on Nocturnal Wonderland in Los Angeles and later on Electric Daisy Carnival. The large attendance led to crowd control issues, with riot police using tear gas to disperse the crowd outside the gates.

In January 2000, the Drug Enforcement Agency (DEA) initiated "Operation Rave Review," targeting the owners of the State Palace Theater in New Orleans, as well as Estopinal and his raves. The DEA searched the State Palace Theater and office based on the suspicion that the venue and/or Estopinal were smuggling and selling drugs, using runners with VIP credentials. After the search, the DEA left and Estopinal proceeded with his show that night. In January 2001, federal prosecutors charged Estopinal under the Crack House Law. He was also threatened with charges under the Continuing Criminal Enterprise (CCE) statute. Estopinal and the manager of the State Palace Theater pleaded "not guilty" and sought a dismissal. The American Civil Liberties Union (ACLU) took on the case, and in March 2001, Estopinal emerged victorious. Later in 2001, he moved to Ohio and expanded into producing shows in Columbus, Cleveland, Cincinnati, Detroit, Pittsburgh, Nashville, and Memphis. In 2003, Congress passed the RAVE Act.

Beginning in 2008, after years of collaborations in California, Estopinal partnered with Pasquale Rotella, CEO of Insomniac Events, to strategically develop the Insomniac brand throughout the U.S. This included bringing EDC to Dallas, Orlando, Puerto Rico, New York City, and Las Vegas, as well as bringing Nocturnal Wonderland to Austin, Beyond Wonderland to Seattle, and co-founding Electric Forest in Michigan.

In 2012, Estopinal developed a strategy for consolidating electronic music companies. He created a pitch deck and presented it to Bob Sillerman, who founded Live Nation. Estopinal's deck later formed the basis for SFX's roll-up strategy. Sillerman's first acquisition was Disco Donnie Presents. With Estopinal's support, SFX acquired Electric Zoo, ID&T, React, Beatport, and Flavorus, among others. In 2013, Afrojack rang the bell at NASDAQ to celebrate Sillerman taking SFX public.

=== DDP goes international 2014 ===
Disco Donnie Presents expanded into international markets, producing shows in Canada, Mexico, Panama, and the Dominican Republic, including club shows and international festivals such as The Day After.

In 2016, SFX declared bankruptcy, and LiveStyle emerged as the new corporate umbrella for Disco Donnie Presents, React, Made, and Beatport. Estopinal began working with LiveStyle's then CEO Randy Phillips.

=== Return to Independence 2020 ===
On April 1, 2020, Disco Donnie became the first electronic music company founder to buy his company back. To date, Disco Donnie Presents has produced over 16,000 shows and sold over 16,000,000 tickets in over 100 cities since its inception.

== Regional promotion partners ==
Disco Donnie Presents regularly collaborates with regional partners, including NightCulture, Sugar Society, Sunset Events, Full Access, Steve LeVine Entertainment & Public Relations, Red Cube, SMG Events, Heavier Than Gravity, Global Groove Events, Ampersand Events, Ultimo, B&W Productions, Tru Events, Amplified Access, Eventvibe, Stellar Spark Events, Committee Entertainment, Cult Entertainment Group, My Best Friends Party, and Party Bassics.

== Festivals and notable events ==
Since its launch in 1994, Disco Donnie Presents has organized 7,000 live events, arena shows, and outdoor festivals in over 100 markets globally. Noteworthy events include Something Wicked in Houston, Texas; Sunset Music Festival in Tampa, Florida; Sun City Music Festival in El Paso, Texas; Alive Music Festival in Mexico; the Ultimate Music Experience on South Padre Island, Texas; Sound Wave Music Festival in Arizona; and the Zoolu party in New Orleans, Louisiana.

=== Freaky Deaky Texas ===
After discontinuing the Something Wicked brand, and during the SFX era, Estopinal partnered with React in 2018 to bring Chicago's Halloween dance music experience to Houston, Texas. The first year sold 25,000 tickets. In 2019, the event moved from Sam Houston Race Park to Houston Raceway Park and became wholly owned by Disco Donnie Presents. In 2020, the event was intended to combine with Ubbi Dubbi for a supersized event, Ubbi Dubbi Gets Freaky Deaky, but was later postponed due to the COVID-19 pandemic.

=== The Day After Festival ===
Day After Festival is a carnival-themed experience in Panama City, Panama, held on the second weekend of January. The festival debuted in 2013 with regional partner ShowPro. A partnership with ShowPro was announced later that year, and the event expanded to three days for the 2014 edition. Located at Figali Plaza Convention Center, the event has hosted artists such as Hardwell, NERVO, Afrojack, and David Guetta.

=== Something Wicked Festival ===
Something Wicked is Houston's Halloween EDM event. Disco Donnie Presents and NightCulture debuted the event in 2012 at Sam Houston Race Park, where it was held until 2017. The first Something Wicked had an estimated total of 12,000 attendees.

=== Something Wonderful Festival ===
In 2015, Disco Donnie Presents and Nightculture debuted Something Wonderful, a springtime sister event to Something Wicked, in Dallas. Something Wonderful was held at the Cotton Bowl. In 2016, the event was moved to Texas Motor Speedway, where it was held in 2017. The event was discontinued in 2018 and replaced by Disco Donnie Presents' new springtime Dallas festival, Ubbi Dubbi.[27]

=== Sun City Music Festival ===
Sun City Music Festival was the first EDM event hosted in El Paso, Texas. Held on Labor Day Weekend each year, the first Sun City was hosted at Cohen Stadium, and Ascarate Park has hosted the event since then.

=== Sunset Music Festival ===
Tampa's Sunset Music Festival launched in 2012, marking it as the first EDM event for the city. The event occurs every Memorial Day Weekend. In early 2014, Disco Donnie Presents and regional partner Sunset Events announced that the event would expand to two days.

=== Ubbi Dubbi Music Festival ===
Ubbi Dubbi is Disco Donnie's festival brand which is themed around two characters known as Ubbi & Dubbi. Its inaugural year saw success, with its 2020 follow-up postponed due to the COVID-19 pandemic. In 2021, the event moved to Texas Motorplex in Ennis, Texas. In 2022, the event was moved back to Panther Island and discontinued the camping features.

=== Ultimate Music Experience ===
Ultimate Music Experience is an EDM festival which generally takes place the second week of March at Schlitterbahn Water Park on South Padre Island, Texas. Disco Donnie Presents, Global Groove, and Sugar Society launched the event in 2011 as a two-day event; it has since grown to become a three-day event with an opening party.

=== Zoolu ===
Zoolu is a three-day event and the longest-running party for Disco Donnie Presents, taking place every Mardi Gras weekend at the State Palace Theater from 1995 to 2006. In 2007, the event was relocated due to interior damage caused by Hurricane Katrina.

== Charitable contributions ==
Disco Donnie Presents has donated to various local charities and organizations.

Over the last 10 years, DDP has donated over $600,000 to local charities and groups following its festival events. At Ubbi Dubbi Festival in 2021 (Ennis, Texas), DDP donated $35,000 to local charities, including $15,000 to the NorthTexas Food Bank and $20,000 to Ennis Cares. In 2021, DDP and Sunset Music Festival donated $50,000 to local Tampa charities, including $25,000 to the Moffitt Cancer Center for Adolescent and Young Adult Program and $25,000 to the Bay Pines VA Healthcare System in Florida. Most recently, DDP has committed $1,000,000 in tickets to First Responders, veterans, and Gold Star families.

== $1 million ticket donation ==
The donation was made to non-profit organizations Vet Tix and 1st Tix (which is powered by Vet Tix), national 501(c)(3) foundations supporting military and first responder communities. These services provide free event tickets to first responders, currently serving military, veterans, and gold-star families for sporting events, concerts, performing arts, and family activities.

The donation is dedicated in memory of PFC Jason Hill Estopinal, Estopinal's cousin, who was killed in action in Afghanistan in 2010 during Operation Enduring Freedom.

"Our first responders and veterans are the ones who keep us safe and they've had a rough year. We wanted to show them some love, honor their work, and spark a little joy, by welcoming our heroes to our best festivals and club shows. We invite other promoters from all types of music to join us in this effort,” said Disco Donnie.

The $1,000,000 ticket donation followed a $150,000 donation of 2021 Freaky Deaky Texas tickets. In addition to ticket donations, Freaky Deaky has also donated to local groups, including $10,000 to the Houston Food Bank and $10,000 to the Texas Association of First Responders. DDP also donated $25,000 to Americares for Hurricane Ida relief. In total, DDP has donated over $500,000 to local charities. DDP's combined ticket and cash donations over the past eight years total over $1.5 million.

== Bob Moog Foundation ==
The partnership between Disco Donnie Presents and the Bob Moog Foundation aims to educate and inspire elementary school students through the integration of science and music in their curriculum.

== Dr. Bob's Sonic Workshop ==
With a portion of the ticket sales from Houston's Something Wicked 2013, The Bob Moog Foundation, DDP, NightCulture, and Stereo Live presented the Dr. Bob's Sonic Workshop to the entire student body at Cornelius Elementary School in December 2013. The workshop consisted of an interactive sonic experience and a 45-minute presentation of the science of sound, intended to inspire creativity in students by introducing them to the physics and science of electronic music.
