= Every Picture Tells a Story (event) =

- Status: Defunct
- Genre: Electronic dance festivals
- Venue: Global Village, TVU Warehouse, West Gate Sports Complex, Bertie St Warehouse, Festival Hall, Docklands
- Locations: Melbourne, Victoria, Australia
- Years active: 1993–2000, 2010
- Founder: Heidi John, Richard John, Melbourne Underground Development (M.U.D.)
- Most recent: 17 April 2010

Every Picture Tells a Story were a series of all-night electronic dance music festivals held at different venues in Melbourne. In 1991 Heidi John and Richard John started a series of warehouse, rave parties. In 1993 they formed the Melbourne Underground Development (M.U.D.) crew with Phil Woodman (a.k.a. Phil Voodoo, Deja Voodoo). From 1993 to 1997 the parties were held at the Global Village in suburban, Footscray. Some 21 such parties were held until the year 2000. A one-off Every Picture Tells a Story event was held in April 2010.

== Every Picture and other M.U.D. events ==
In 1991 Heidi John and Richard John organised a set of rave parties as all-night electronic dance music festivals, Every Picture Tells a Story. In the 1980s they had attended warehouse parties in the United Kingdom, which were run by local crews before they ran their own parties in London's East End with Joe Wieczorek of Club Labyrinth. The Johns created a similar collective, Melbourne Underground Development (M.U.D.), with Phil Woodman (a.k.a. Phil Voodoo, Deja Voodoo), and local DJs (Will E Tell, Richie Rich, HMC) who each performed for several hours. Paul Fleckney, in his book Techno Shuffle (2015), praised how "During the 90s, the Johns keep the underground flame burning with jungle and breakbeat DJs."

Aside from live electronic musicians and DJs, the festivals featured computer animation, performance artists and visual art. From 1993, the parties were held at the Global Village warehouse complex in Footscray, and later also at TVU Warehouse Footscray, West Gates Sports Complex Altona, Epicentre (Byron Bay, New South Wales), and the Bertie St Warehouse, Port Melbourne. Each festival used a collective of artists (such as the Mutoid Waste Company) and DJs who together formed the local underground techno movement. Some of the TVU Warehouse performances were screened live-to-air. M.U.D.'s Woodman organised the May 2000 event, "Everyone comes in, they live here for a week, they all draw banners... They all work together, they all connect, they are in one mindframe. That's what started this party." Woodman, as Deja Voodoo, is a mixed-media artist; an exhibition of his artwork was held in June 2013. M.U.D. also put on other events such as the Pleazure and Strange parties, each had their own themes, décor, installation art, video graphics and vibe with music performed by dozens of Australian and international live acts and DJs.

The final Every Picture Tells a Story party (number 21) was held on 4 November 2000 at Festival Hall, Melbourne. Appearing at festivals were international acts, including Luke Slater, Claude Young, Derrick May, Stacey Pullen, Ultra Sonic. The visual aesthetic for Every Picture Tells a Story events made a cultural impact in Melbourne. Christine Siokou described the local rave party scene of 1998 to 1999, she noted that Every Picture Tells a Story "parties aim for an all-ages crowd" and that their "capacity crowds" show that "the thousands of young people attending raves associate, to varying degrees, with a raver identity".

In 2010 Every Picture Tells a Story returned for a one-off performance, Frequency Shift. After the devastating bush fires in Victoria in February 2009, community spirit needed to be lifted and a space was offered to M.U.D. to stage a special 3-day gathering in the Yarra Valley. The event was due on 16 to 18 April 2010, but was cancelled due to council restrictions. A warehouse day-night event took place instead on 17 April 2010 at the Melbourne Docklands, shed 4.

== Global Village ==
Global Village was a warehouse complex in an industrial area of Footscray, named by Richard John of M.U.D. Once the Docklands Cotton Mill, the huge warehouse space was lying unused and was discovered by Woodman in 1993; he recognised its potential as an arts and events space. Global Village was first used as a rave venue on New Year's Eve 1993-1994 when it hosted the seventh Every Picture Tells a Story party.

Global Village was the first of its kind in Australia, and possibly the world - a local council approved venue that allowed for total freedom to create any style of event without noise restrictions or hours of operation. It hosted a range of events, from a Melbourne Fashion Festival show, art exhibitions (such as Mind a Maze) and dance parties.

Over sixty events were held, and the final, Shut-Down, party was held on 22 February 1997. The afternoon of the party, the building's owners attempted to stop it taking place by locking the organisers out and putting security guards in place. M.U.D. moved the sound system into the outside courtyard and with hundreds of guests beginning to queue, the local police were called by the owner's to assist in shutting the event down. However, due to its popularity and the size of the crowd, and the fact that no problems had ever arisen at previous events, the police allowed the party to go ahead fearing a riot may take place if they intervened. Woodman described Global Village as "artistic hub of like-minded people that came to dance, laugh, and express themselves in a safe, inspirational environment that was unique to the 90's."

== Responses ==
"Artists came out of the woodwork," visual artist, Garry Shepherd, told the ABC's Sounds Like Techno online documentary in 2002. "Where else do you get to play with a ready-made crowd and a huge sound system and lasers at your disposal?" In the same documentary, fellow artist Robin Cooke agreed: "These events were so big, eight to nine thousand people. This was too big for one or two artists to handle; it needed 20 artists to make the thing come together."

Melbourne journalist and former editor of Zebra (dance music insert) in Inpress magazine, Andrez Bergen (a.k.a. Little Nobody), described the venue: "Global Village was one of the most important semi-institutions in Melbourne in the mid '90s especially. The crew behind Global Village, namely M.U.D., were very supportive of the more cutting edge live acts, for example Voiteck, Zen Paradox, Soulenoid, Guyver III, Sense and TR-Storm – who were then known as Void – and it gave these guys the opportunity to play before large and often more-into-it or dare I say 'enlightened' audiences. It also gave audiences the opportunity to see these guys because at more mainstream parties or clubs more mainstream music was played."

"The first thing I noticed upon arrival was the queue. Immense," wrote Lindy Tan in a review of Every Picture Tells a Story: Equinox in March 1998 for Tranzfusion website. She continued, "It's true that Every Picture parties always seem to attract quite a younger crowd, but – as per usual – there was stunning decor, a great venue, and great local acts." Also at Tranzfusion, Natural 1, wrote "M.U.D. is an institution within Melbourne's dance community, establishing the first specifically designed rave venue, Global Village, which was home to more than 60 events over a 4-year period."

== Record label ==
M.U.D. also operated a record label, which released three Every Picture Tells a Story compilation albums by various artists including Melbourne-based producers: Voiteck, Zen Paradox, Soulenoid, Guyver III, Sense, Slieker, Honeysmack, Little Nobody (a.k.a. Andrez Bergen), Son of Zev, TR-Storm, Kandyman, Davide Carbone, Sugar, Lumukanda, Natural 1, The DEA, PB909, Ollie Bobbitt, Drek and Kilroy.

== See also ==
- List of electronic music festivals
