= Spring Zouk =

- Genre: Electronic music, etc.
- Dates: February 3–5
- Locations: St Mary's Islands in Udupi, India
- Years active: 2012
- Website: springzouk.in at the Wayback Machine (archived February 14, 2012)

Spring Zouk is the name of an infamous festival in which was held February 3–5, 2012 at Udupi beach on at St Mary's Islands in India. The festival was a project coordinated by the state government and various sponsors to attract international tourism.

== Description ==
The event was a 3-day music festival where 30 international bands performed.

== Sponsors ==
The event was sponsored by Kingfisher, VH1, and the government of Karnataka.

== Performers ==
Juno Reactor, Prem Joshua, Braindrop, Gipsy Shalon and others were among the performers at the event.

== Reviews ==
Attendees at the event reported that it was successful and fun.

== Porngate ==
It was accused that at the event some people had public sex. Actually, there was this just one incident, where a foreign couple had their clothes on. but were gyrating each other. Someone took a video clip of this and when they did air on TV, the bodies of the couple were blurred to leave it to peoples imagination. Then there was talk among some local people that the foreigners' way of having a party was not in accord with local customs. A government committee decided to review the events at the party and compare them with community values.

Shortly after the party, some members of the Karnataka Legislative Assembly watched a sexually explicit video taken from this event during government proceedings, and subsequently resigned amid public outcry of watching pornography. The media named the scandal about watching the video from this event as Porngate.

== See also ==
- List of electronic music festivals
- Live electronic music
