= Bal en Blanc =

Annual Rave Party held in Montreal, Canada

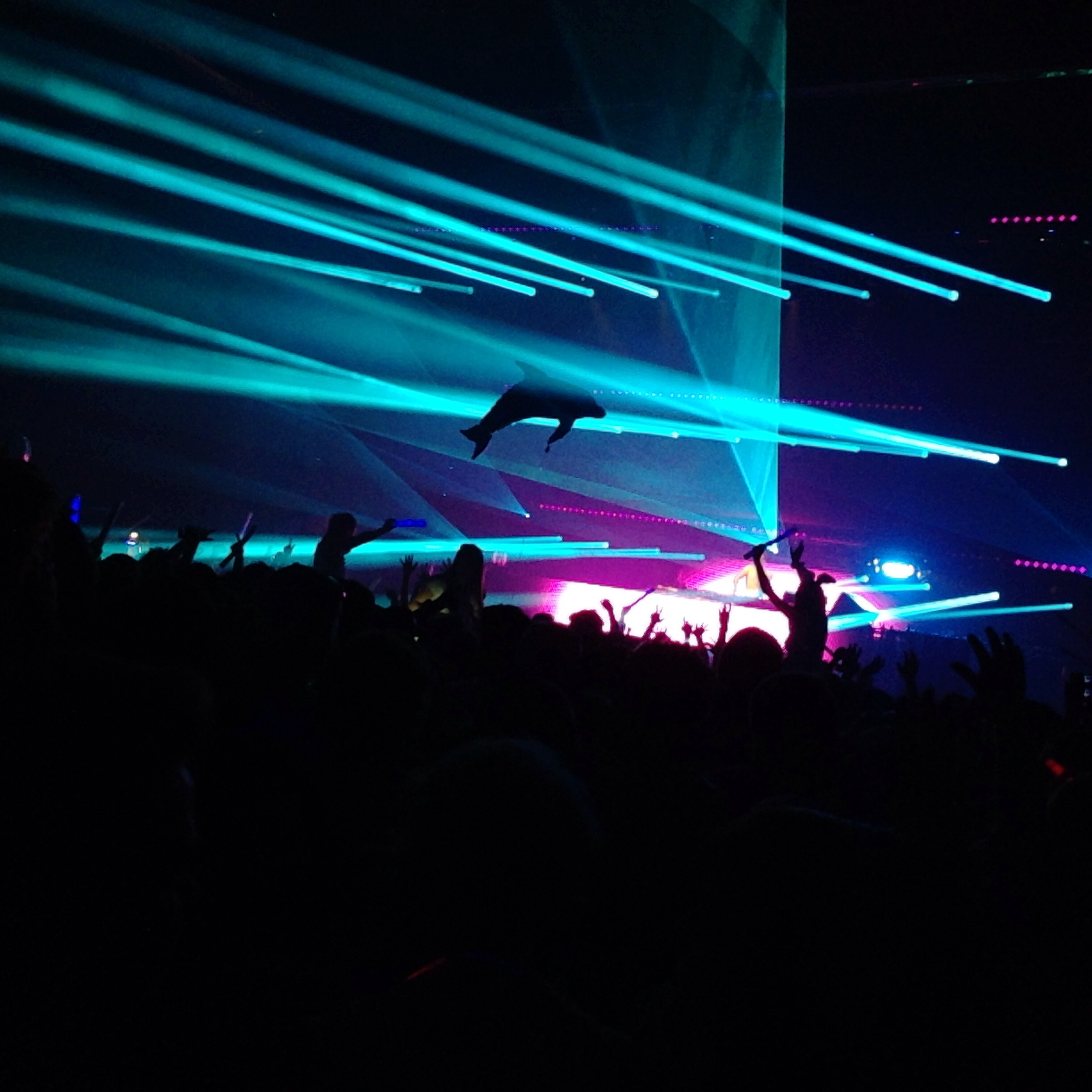
- Genre: Electronic music
- Dates: Easter holiday weekend, 28 May (Bal en Blanc in the park), Canada Day Weekend
- Locations: Montreal, Quebec, Canada
- Years active: 1995-2019, 2022-present
- Website: Bal en Blanc Official Website

Bal en Blanc is a rave party that is hosted annually, during the Easter holiday weekend, in Montreal, Quebec, Canada. It was first held in 1995, and the first event had 800 attendees.

No rave party was held in 2020-21.

== See also ==
- List of electronic music festivals
- List of music festivals in Canada
- Black and Blue Festival
