= Culture of San Francisco =

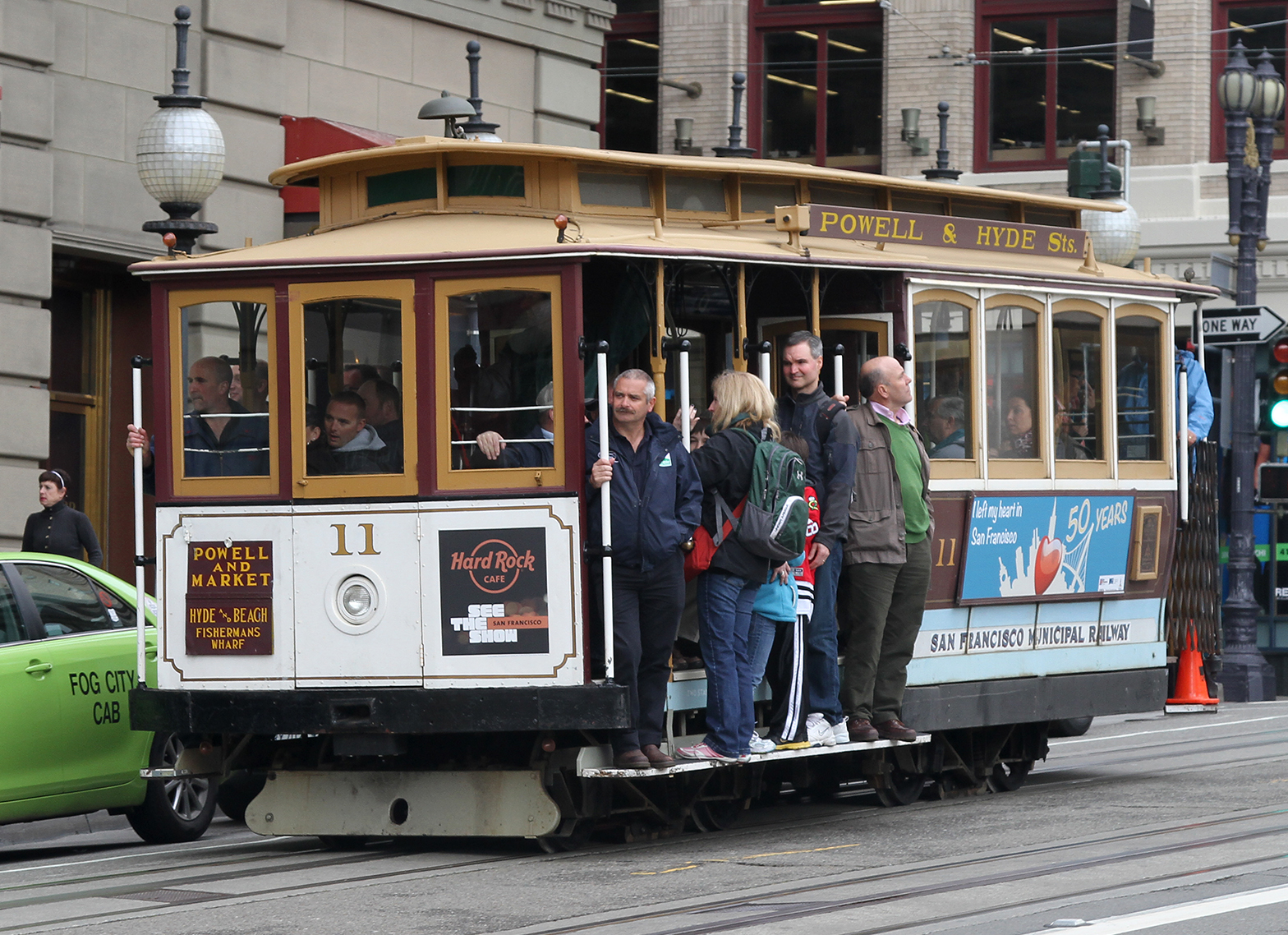
A San Francisco cable car

The culture of San Francisco is major and diverse in terms of arts, music, cuisine, festivals, museums, and architecture but also is influenced heavily by Mexican culture due to its large Hispanic population, and its history as part of Spanish America and Mexico. San Francisco's diversity of cultures along with its eccentricities are so great that they have greatly influenced the country and the world at large over the years. In 2012, Bloomberg Businessweek voted San Francisco as America's Best City.

== Museums ==
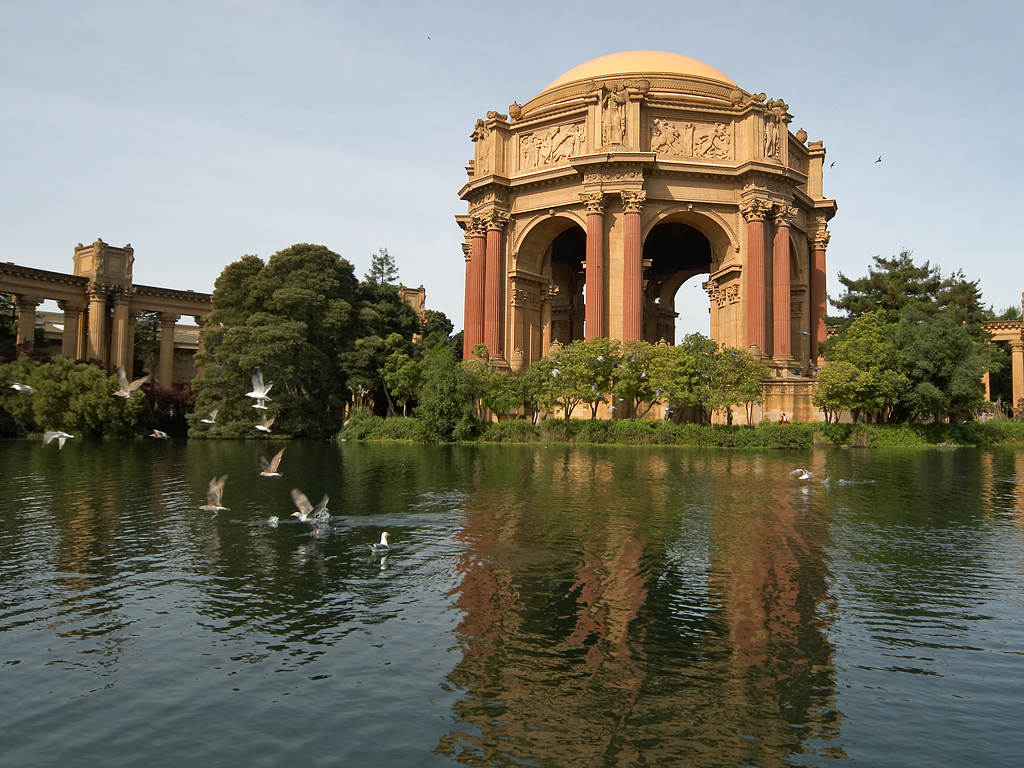
Palace of Fine Arts

The Museum of Modern Art (SFMOMA) contains 20th Century and contemporary pieces. It moved to its building in South of Market in 1995 and attracts 600,000 visitors annually. The California Palace of the Legion of Honor contains primarily European works. The de Young Museum and the Asian Art Museum have significant anthropological and non-European holdings.

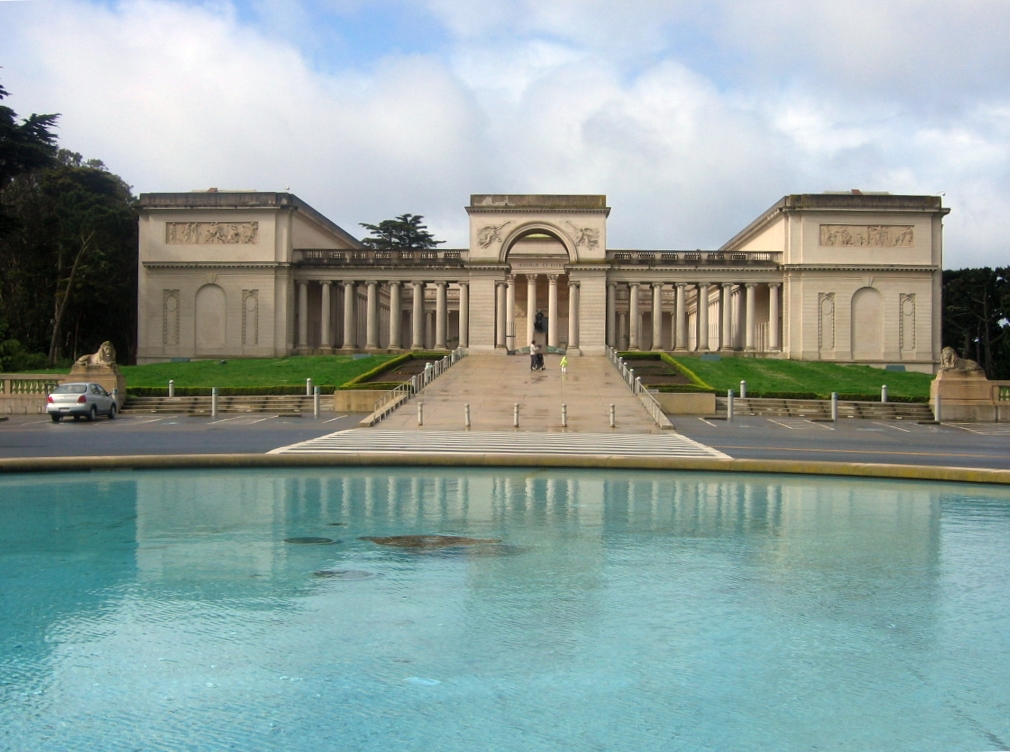
Palace of the Legion of Honor

The Palace of Fine Arts, a remnant of the 1915 Panama-Pacific Exposition, used to house the Exploratorium, a popular science museum dedicated to teaching through hands-on interaction, which moved to a new location on the Embarcadero in 2013. The California Academy of Sciences is a natural history museum and hosts the Morrison Planetarium and Steinhart Aquarium. The Asian Art Museum of San Francisco has one of the most comprehensive collections of Asian art in the world. From 1958 until 2003 the collection was housed in a wing of the original de Young Museum in Golden Gate Park. When the de Young closed while constructing a new building, the Asian Art Museum moved to the former San Francisco City Library building, which was renovated for the purpose under the direction of Italian architect Gae Aulenti who had previously overseen the conversion of the Musée d'Orsay in Paris.

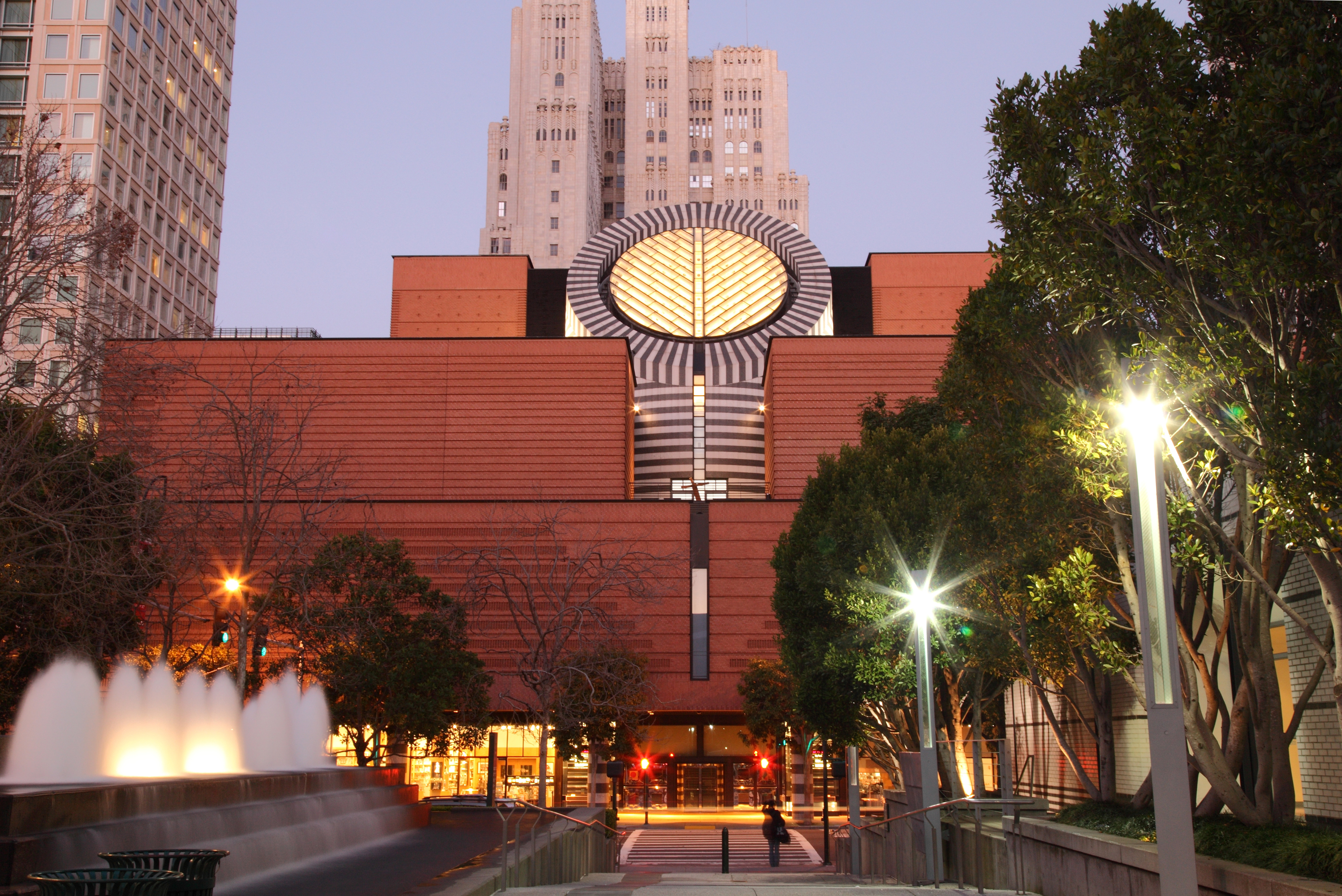
The red brick and central circular structure of the San Francisco Museum of Modern Art as seen from Yerba Buena Gardens. The Art Deco-style Pacific Telephone Building (1925) rises behind the museum.

The San Francisco Zoo cares for a total of about 250 animal species, 39 of which have been deemed endangered or threatened.

Other museums include the Museum of the African Diaspora, the Contemporary Jewish Museum, the Museum of Craft & Folk Art, the Cartoon Art Museum, and the Mexican Museum. Some "offbeat" museums and galleries dealing in unconventional topics include the Antique Vibrator Museum, the Musée Mécanique (dedicated to penny arcade machines), the Museum of Ophthalmology, Ripley's Believe it or Not Museum, the Stamp Francisco/Stamp Art Gallery (rubber stamps not postal stamps), the Tattoo Art Museum (old tattoo machines and instruments), the UFO, Bigfoot and Loch Ness Monster Museum, and the Wax Museum at Fisherman's Wharf.

== Music and nightlife ==
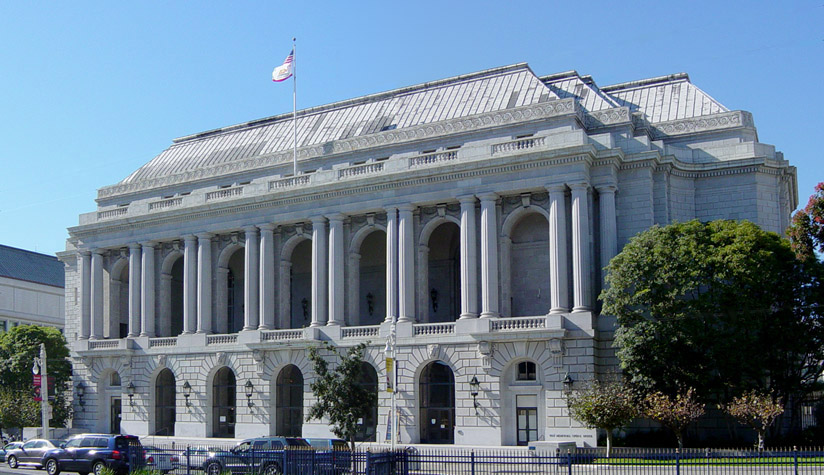
War Memorial Opera House, San Francisco

Classical and opera venues in San Francisco include the San Francisco Symphony, the San Francisco Opera and the San Francisco Ballet. They all perform at the San Francisco War Memorial and Performing Arts Center. San Francisco's Ballet and Opera are some of the oldest continuing performing arts companies in the United States. San Francisco is the birthplace and home city of the vocal ensemble Chanticleer. The city is also home to the American Conservatory Theater, also known as A.C.T., which has been routinely staging original productions since its arrival in San Francisco in 1967. Additionally, the New Conservatory Theatre Center (NCTC) is known for being an intimate theater that routinely stages original productions by the local, national, and international LGBTQIA+ community. Hundreds of smaller, alternative theatres also attract a significant portion of the audience given their historical role in the San Francisco performing arts culture. The oldest of these are Intersection for the Arts, founded in 1965, and the Magic Theatre, founded in 1967. A major player in the promotion of theater in the Bay Area is Theatre Bay Area (or TBA). A non profit organization, Theatre Bay Area has members from more than 365 Bay Area theatre and dance companies, is the publisher of Callboard Magazine, and runs San Francisco's Half-Priced Ticket Booth.

The Fillmore is a music venue located in the Western Addition. It is the second incarnation of the historic venue that gained fame in the 1960s under concert promoter Bill Graham, housing the stage where now-famous musicians such as the Grateful Dead, Janis Joplin, Led Zeppelin and Jefferson Airplane first performed, fostering the San Francisco Sound. Beach Blanket Babylon was a zany musical revue and a civic institution that performed to sold-out crowds in North Beach from 1974—2019. In its former location, the Club Fugazi, now resides Dear San Francisco, a revue featuring acrobatics, choreography, spoken word, video projections, shadow play, and original music, focused on the emotional impact and the myths of San Francisco. Bimbo's 365 Club, in North Beach, is one of the city's oldest entertainment venues and plays host to music shows of all genres. Most nightclubs in San Francisco are exclusive to audiences age 21 and older; the two most prominent nightclubs in the city which are open to ages 18 and older are 715 Harrison (known locally by its two event names Club X and City Nights) as well as DNA Lounge. The Independent on Divisadero Street offers all-ages shows as well as 18+ and 21+ shows. Nightlife venues occasionally have a strong affiliation with a certain theme or culture, such as 1015 Folsom, which has a history with BDSM culture, or Temple, noted for its futurism and energy-generating dance floor.

Additionally, San Francisco is home to the 200-member San Francisco Gay Men's Chorus, the world's first openly gay chorus, as well as the San Francisco Lesbian/Gay Freedom Band. Two additional gay choruses, the Lesbian/Gay Chorus of San Francisco and Golden Gate Men's Chorus, also perform throughout the year.

== Theater ==
San Francisco has a large number of theaters and live performance venues. Local theater companies have been noted for risk taking and innovation, as documented in the film Stage Left: A Story of Theater in San Francisco. The Tony Award-winning non-profit American Conservatory Theater (A.C.T.) is a member of the national League of Resident Theatres, and has been in San Francisco since it moved from Pittsburgh in 1967. Other local winners of the Regional Theatre Tony Award include the San Francisco Mime Troupe, and Berkeley Rep in nearby Berkeley. The Magic Theatre was the home theater of the playwright Sam Shepard during his most productive period, and many of his plays were first staged there. San Francisco-based SHN hosts productions of Broadway shows in its vintage 1920s-era venues in the Theater District: the Curran, Orpheum, and Golden Gate Theatres.

San Francisco theaters frequently host pre-Broadway engagements and tryout runs, and some original San Francisco productions have later moved to Broadway. Plays and productions that have been staged in San Francisco (or nearby) prior to their Broadway productions include the following:

- A Chorus Line (revival) at the Curran Theatre (2006)
- Ain't Too Proud at Berkeley Rep (2017)
- Amélie at Berkeley Rep (2015)
- American Idiot at Berkeley Rep (2009)
- Angels in America: Millennium Approaches at the Eureka Theatre (1991)
- Beautiful: The Carole King Musical at the Curran Theatre (2013)
- Biloxi Blues at the Curran Theatre (1985)
- The Boys in the Band at Theatre Rhinoceros (1990)
- Brighton Beach Memoirs at the Curran Theatre (1983)
- Bring It On the Musical at the Orpheum Theatre (2011–2012)
- Buried Child at the Magic Theatre (1978)
- Cabaret (revival) at the Golden Gate Theatre (1987)
- Carnival in Flanders at the Curran Theatre (1953)
- Choir Boy at the Boyer Theatre (2015)
- Dame Edna: Back With a Vengeance at the Curran Theatre (2004)
- Defending the Caveman at The Improv San Francisco (1991)
- Diversions & Delights at the Marines Memorial Theatre (1977)
- Evita at the Orpheum Theatre (1979)
- Fences at the Curran Theatre (1987)
- Fool for Love at the Magic Theatre (1983)
- For Colored Girls Who Have Considered Suicide / When the Rainbow Is Enuf at the Bacchanal Bar in Albany, California (1974)
- Forever Tango (1994–1996)
- Gigi at the Curran Theatre (1973)
- Godspell at the Geary Theater (1972)
- Head Over Heels at the Curran Theatre (2018)
- High Society at the Geary Theater (1997)
- Home Sweet Homer (Odyssey) at the Curran Theatre (1975)
- Hugh Jackman in Performance at the Curran Theatre (2011)
- In the Next Room (or The Vibrator Play) at Berkeley Rep (2009)
- Jitney at the Curran Theatre (2002)
- Joseph and the Amazing Technicolor Dreamcoat (revival) at the Golden Gate Theatre (1993)
- Kismet at the Curran Theatre (1953)
- La Boheme (Baz Luhrmann's production) at the Curran Theatre (2002)
- Latin History for Morons at Berkeley Rep (2016)
- Legally Blonde at the Golden Gate Theatre (2007)
- Lennon at the Curran Theatre (2006)
- Lestat at the Curran Theatre (2005–2006)
- Magdalena: a Musical Adventure at the Curran Theatre (1948)
- Mama Mia! at the Orpheum Theatre (2000–2001)
- Martin Short: Fame Becomes Me at the Curran Theatre (2006)
- Memphis at TheatreWorks (2002 & 2004)
- Metamorphoses at the Zellerbach Playhouse (Berkeley Rep) (1999)
- My Fair Lady (revival) at the Golden Gate Theatre (1981)
- No Man's Land (revival) at Berkeley Rep (2013)
- Oh, Hello at the Herbst Theatre (2016)
- Oliver! at the Curran Theatre (1962)
- Passing Strange at Berkeley Rep (2006)
- Peter Pan at the Curran Theatre (1954)
- Pickwick at the Curran Theatre (1965)
- Ring of Fire at the Curran Theatre (2006)
- Seared at San Francisco Playhouse (2016)
- Show Girl at the Curran Theatre (1959)
- Stones in His Pockets at the Magic Theatre (1999)
- Straight White Men at the Boyer Theatre (2018)
- The Act at the Orpheum Theatre (1977)
- The Grand Tour at the Curran Theatre (1978)
- The Invention of Love at the Geary Theater (2000)
- The Two-Character Play at the Showcase Theatre (1976)
- Three Wishes for Jamie at the Curran Theatre (1951)
- True West at the Magic Theatre (1980)
- What the Constitution Means to Me at Berkeley Rep (2018)
- White Christmas at the Curran Theatre (2004–2005)
- Wicked at the Curran Theatre (2003)
- Wishful Drinking at Berkeley Rep (2008)

== Popular music ==
San Francisco has often hosted influential rock music trends, starting with the San Francisco Sound during the 1960s. Two of the most influential bands from that era, the Grateful Dead and Jefferson Airplane, started out in San Francisco in 1965. Other groups include rockers Creedence Clearwater Revival, Santana, soft rock band Pablo Cruise and Journey, seminal punk band the Dead Kennedys, and alternative metal band Faith No More. It is the birthplace of thrash metal with bands such as Metallica, Testament, Exodus, Slayer, Death Angel, Megadeth and latterly Machine Head. San Francisco has had significant influence on punk rock in California since the late 1970s. In the late 1980s and early 1990s it was somewhat influential in rave and electronica. Activity in the Goth/industrial scene has been continuous in the city since then, with it being home to the world's second longest running goth club after Slimelight in London, England. Gentrification during the late 1990s is said to have forced many performers to move away. However, San Francisco is still home to a number of respected music acts, such as Chuck Prophet, Lords of Sealand and John Vanderslice, and especially in the Fillmore and Hunters Point districts, San Francisco is the home of numerous rappers, including Messy Marv, RBL Posse, Rappin' 4-Tay, HughEMC, San Quinn, Andre Nickatina, Big Rich, JT the Bigga Figga, Ant Rich 415, and Paris. San Francisco DJs and electronic musicians are credited with defining the laid-back, dub-influenced sound of the West Coast house music. Prominent DJs and artists include Kaskade, Miguel Migs, Mark Farina, and DJ Garth. Dub Mission is among the city's regular music parties. Since 2000 San Francisco has hosted the How Weird Street Faire, claimed to be the longest-running electronic music street festival in North America.

Famous songs about San Francisco include Tony Bennett's "I Left My Heart in San Francisco", the Scott McKenzie song "San Francisco (Be Sure to Wear Flowers in Your Hair)", People Under The Stairs' "San Francisco Knights", Chris Isaak's "San Francisco Days", Journey's "Lights", "Fake Tales of San Francisco" by the Arctic Monkeys, and "Save Me, San Francisco" by Train.

== Comedy ==
Comedian and actor, Robin Williams helped San Francisco become recognized as a good town for comedy clubs. He rose to fame, having gotten his early start in San Francisco clubs such as the Holy City Zoo, the Punchline and The Other Café in the '70's. He also shot seven films on location in San Francisco.

== Cuisine ==
The city is the birthplace of the local variety of sourdough bread, the Mission burrito, and steam beer. Fisherman's Wharf has served local specialty Dungeness crab for decades. Food companies include Anchor Brewing Company, Boudin Bakery, the Ghirardelli Chocolate Company. Famous past and present restaurants include the Tonga Room, Fleur de Lys, Greens, Original Joe's, Stars, Vesuvio Cafe and the Top of the Mark. California Cuisine and fusion cuisine are prominent in the city. Food trucks are a source of ethnically diverse, and gourmet street foods, with concentrations of various trucks at regular times and places. Notable grocery stores, which often focus on locally-grown organic produce, include the Rainbow Grocery Cooperative and Bi-Rite Market. Johnny Kan opened one of the first modern Chinese restaurants, in Chinatown in 1953.

== Festivals and street fairs ==
San Francisco is home to many different and unique street festivals, parties and parades. Most famous are its gay pride parade, held every June; the Folsom Street Fair held every September; Chinese New Year Parade held in February; Carnaval, held during the spring; Litquake and Hardly Strictly Bluegrass in October. It used to host a North American version of the Loveparade electronic music festival (later known as the "Lovefest" and "LoveEvolution"), held in late summer/early fall, until city officials revoked the event's permits due to safety concerns in 2009. Since 2000 San Francisco has hosted the How Weird Street Faire, claimed to be the longest-running electronic music street festival in North America. Outside Lands Music and Arts Festival in the city is the largest independently owned music festival in the United States. San Francisco is also home to running races such as the Bay to Breakers and the San Francisco Marathon. During Labor Day weekend in 2008, the city played host to the first Slow Food Nation, the first major public event for Slow Food USA and one of the largest food events in the nation.

Many neighborhoods in San Francisco have annual street festivals featuring live music, arts and crafts vendors, and community organizations. Among the largest of these are Castro Street Fair, Union Street Art Festival, North Beach Festival, and Haight-Ashbury Street Fair. The San Francisco Opera company puts on an annual free Opera in the Park performance in Golden Gate Park. The San Francisco Symphony does likewise on several dates in July, including one as part of the Stern Grove Festival. On the Fourth of July holiday, there are fireworks shows over Fisherman's Wharf and Marina Green. Another fireworks show is held every May as part of the KFOG: Kaboom!.

== Architecture and tourist attractions ==
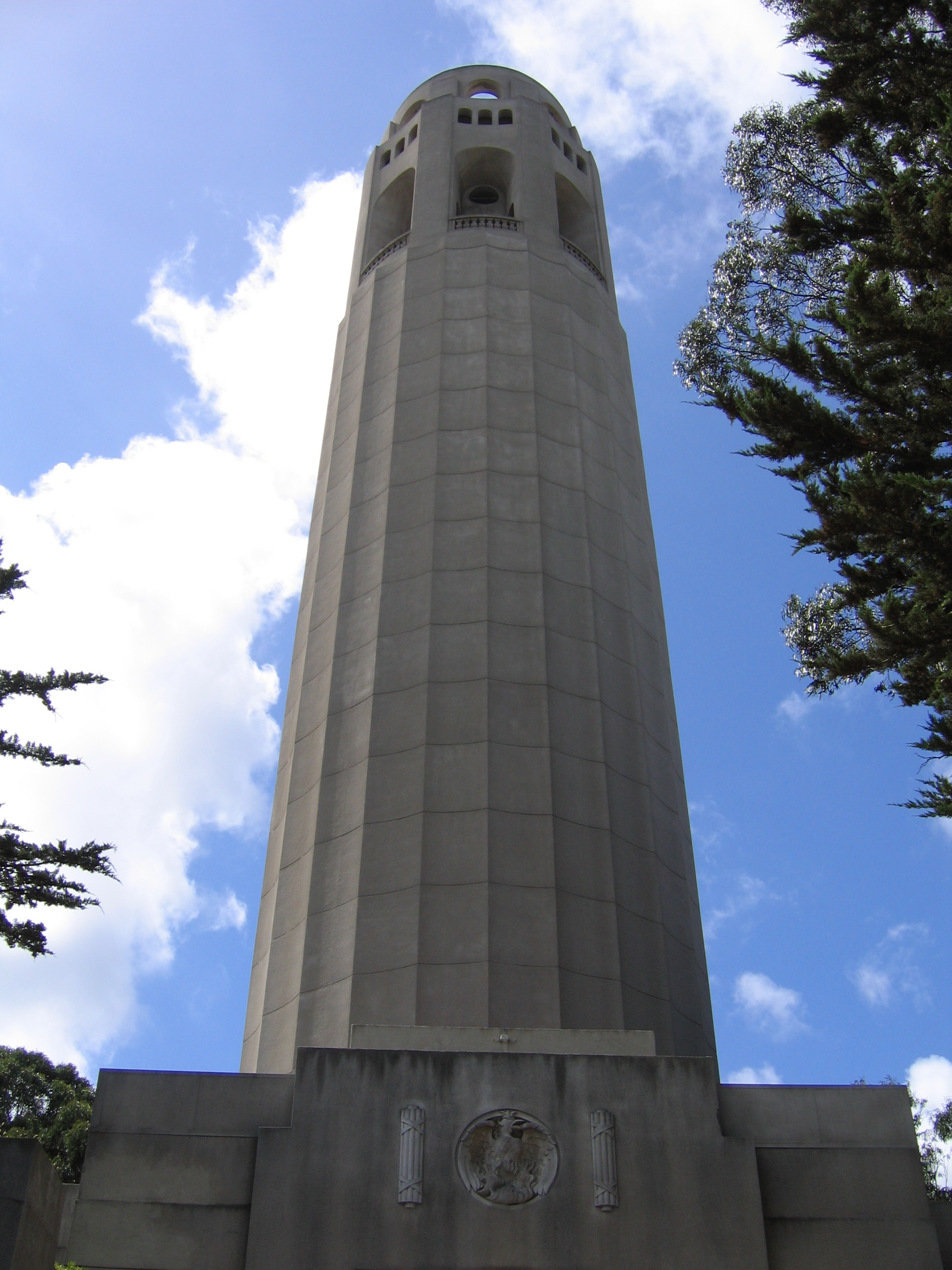
Coit Tower is a major landmark.

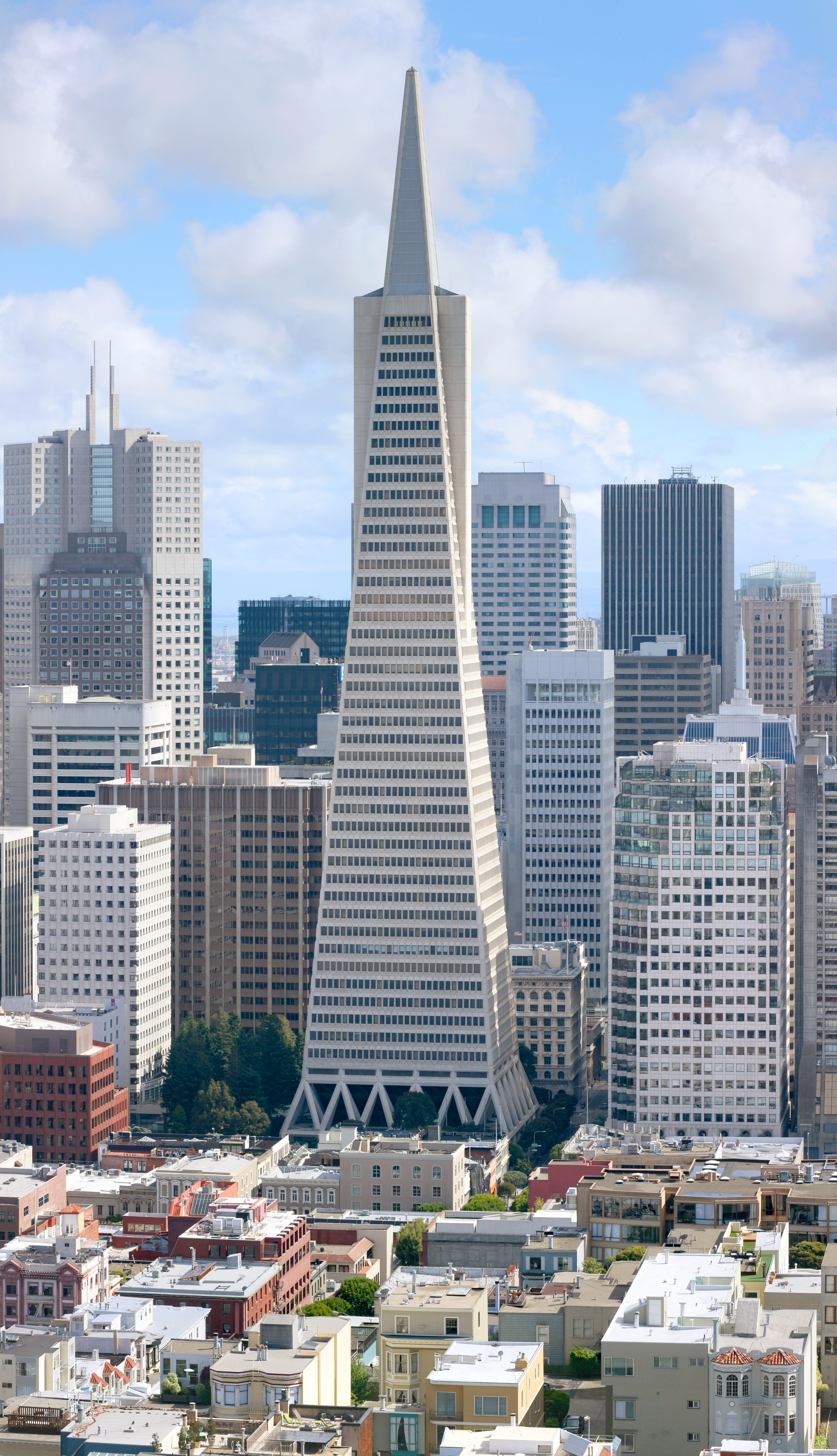
The Transamerica Pyramid, completed in 1972, has become an iconic symbol of the city.

San Francisco offers a plethora of unique architecture as popular tourist attractions. They include: The Civic Center, Coit Tower atop Telegraph Hill, the Ferry Building on the waterfront, the world-renowned Golden Gate Bridge, the twisty and windy Lombard Street in Russian Hill, "Painted Ladies", the terraced victorian houses that can be found citywide, the San Francisco cable car system, the abstract San Francisco Museum of Modern Art, the San Francisco–Oakland Bay Bridge, the ruins of the once great Sutro Baths, Chinatown, and the Transamerica Pyramid.

== Cultural enclaves ==
San Francisco has long been home to many different ethnicities and nationalities from around the world as well as sexual and gender identities, and have developed unique cultural neighborhoods (either naturally or through redlining) over its time.

Cultural enclaves in San Francisco
Enclave name	Neighborhood	Community represented	Official recognition or dedicated district
Asian/Pacific Islander ethnic enclaves
Chinatown	Chinatown, San Francisco & North Beach	Chinese Americans in San Francisco, Hong Kong Americans	Yes, 1848
Clement Street	Richmond District, San Francisco	Chinese Americans in San Francisco, Hong Kong Americans	No
Japantown	Japantown, San Francisco	Japanese Americans	Yes, March 28, 1968
Little Saigon	Tenderloin, San Francisco	Vietnamese Americans	Yes, 2004
Manilatown	Manilatown, San Francisco	Historically Filipino Americans	Yes, 2005
SoMa Pilipinas	South of Market, San Francisco	Filipino Americans	Yes, May 2014
	Pacific Heights, San Francisco	Asian/Pacific Islander American	No
	Bayview–Hunters Point	Pacific Islander Americans	No
African and African American ethnic enclaves
Harlem of the West	Fillmore District, San Francisco	African Americans in San Francisco	No
	Bayview–Hunters Point, San Francisco	African Americans in San Francisco	No
Latin American/Caribbean ethnic enclaves
(Calle 24) Latino Cultural District	Mission District, San Francisco	Mexican Americans primarily, Californios, and Latin Americans	Yes, May 2014
Chilecito / Little Santiago	North Beach, San Francisco	Chilean Americans	No, but commemorated by the Chilean Consulate in 2003
European/Middle Eastern ethnic enclaves
Belden Place / French Quarter	Belden Place	French Americans	Informally
Little Italy	North Beach, San Francisco	Italian Americans	Yes, 1924
Slovenian Hill	Potrero Hill	Slavic Americans	No
Sunset District Eruv	Sunset District, San Francisco	Jewish Americans	
Richmond District Eruv	Richmond District, San Francisco	Jewish Americans	
LGBTQIA enclaves
The Transgender District	Tenderloin, San Francisco	Transgender American	Yes, 2017
Castro LGBTQ Cultural District	Castro District, San Francisco	LGBT Americans	Yes, 2019
LGBTQ Leather Cultural District	South of Market, San Francisco	LGBT Americans	Yes, 2018

== See also ==
- LGBT culture in San Francisco
- List of dramatic theatres in San Francisco
- San Francisco in popular culture
- San Francisco Nature Education
- Social nudity in San Francisco
