= List of Hyoyeon live performances =

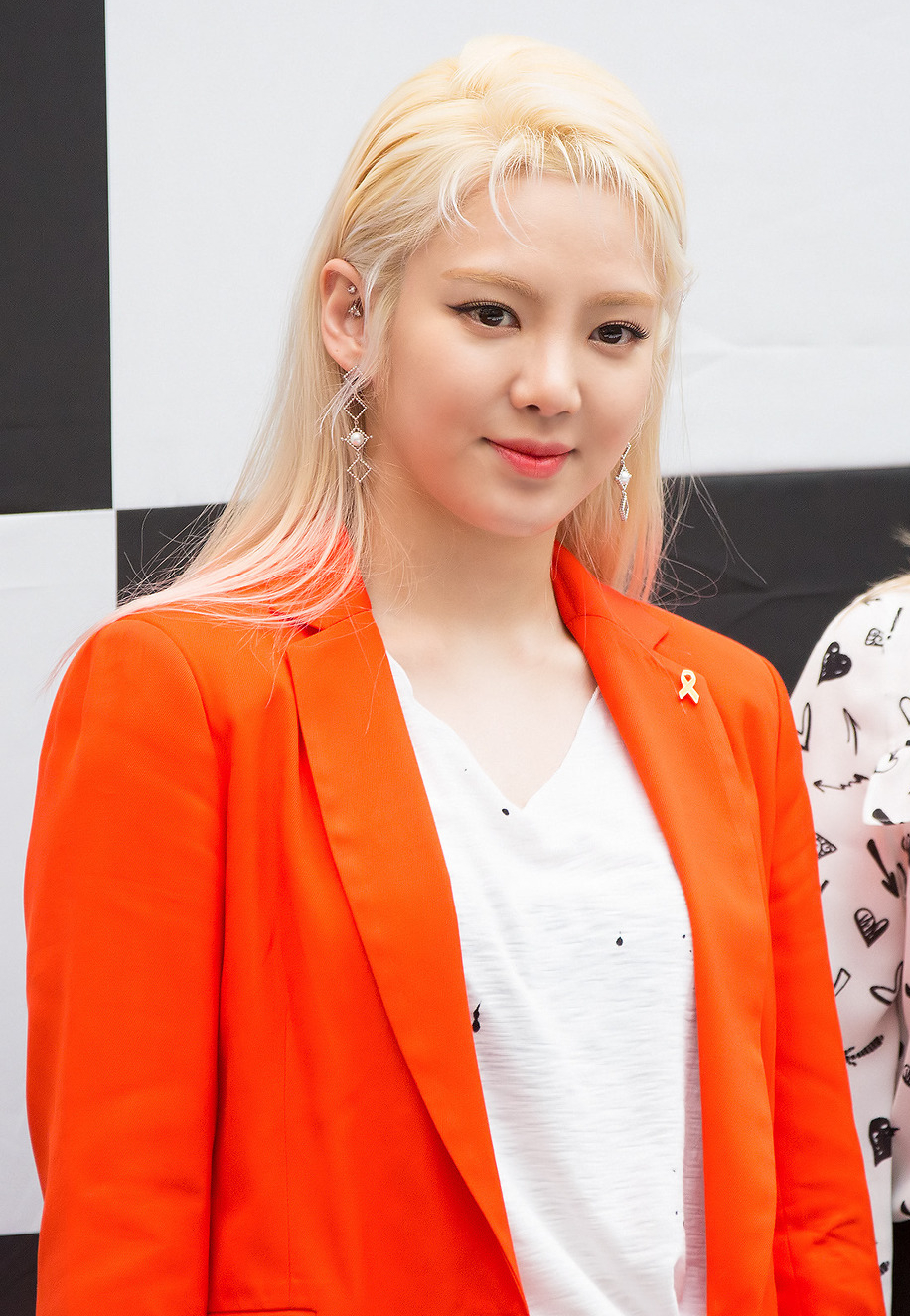
- Hyoyeon in 2017
- Music Festivals: 16
- Tours: 2
- TV Shows & Specials: 19

South Korean singer Hyoyeon has performed in multiple concerts an festivals since November 2005. Her first appearance on stage was in November 2005 performing as silhouette for BoA on her MKMF song which named "Girls on Top".

== Festivals ==
Date	Title	City	Country	Ref.
May 26, 2018	2018 Seoul World DJ Music Festival	Seoul	Korea	
September 9, 2018	Spectrum Dance Music Festival 2018	Seoul	Korea	
December 7, 2018	Legacy Festival	Singapore	Singapore	
July 23, 2022	Coca-Cola Zero MARSHMELLO Launch House Party Festival	Seoul	Korea	
September 6, 2022	Bronze Island Music Festival	Kota Kinabalu	Malaysia	
October 4, 2022	Great Music Festival	Seoul	Korea	
December 31, 2022	Heineken Countdown Party 2023	Hanoi	Vietnam	
January 14, 2023	Grand Wave K-pop Music Festival	Sunbang Jaya	Malaysia	
February 18, 2023	MIK Festival Paris	Paris	France	
June 18, 2023	SEEN Festival	Hoian	Vietnam	
September 30, 2023	2023 Cheongwadae K-Music Festival	Seoul	Korea	
October 6, 2023	Borneo Sonic Music Festival	Kuching	Malaysia	
October 8, 2023	'Peaches' One Universe Festival 2023	Seoul	Korea	
October 13, 2023	K-Magic Live	Manila	Philippines	
November 11, 2023	9Wave Music Festival	Subang Jaya	Malaysia	
November 25, 2023	Martell Noblige Swift Festival	Seri Kembangan	Malaysia	

== Tours ==
=== DJ HYO Tour 2023 in North America ===
Tour dates
Date	Country	City	Venue	Attendance
October 14, 2023	United States	Chicago	Sound-Bar Chicago	600
October 16, 2023	Canada	Montreal	Club Soda	975
October 18, 2023	Canada	Toronto	The Phoenix Concert Theatre	1,350
October 20, 2023	United States	San Francisco	Temple Club	2,500
October 21, 2023	United States	Boston	Royale Boston	1,220
October 27, 2023	United States	New York City	Webster Hall	1,500
October 28, 2023	United States	Madison	Madison Liquid	720
November 2, 2023	Canada	Vancouver	Harbour Event & Convention Centre	1,400
Estimate total				10,265

=== DJ HYO 2024 Spring USA Tour "Cherry Blossom" ===
Tour dates
Date	Country	City	Venue	Attendance
March 22, 2024	United States	Los Angeles	Exchange LA	1,500
March 23, 2024	United States	Atlantic City	HQ2 Nightclub	500
March 29, 2024	United States	Atlanta	District Atlanta	1,000
March 30, 2024	United States	Austin	Summit Rooftop	500
April 5, 2024	United States	Chicago	Sound-Bar Chicago	600
April 12, 2024	United States	Denver	Temple Club	2,500
April 13, 2024	United States	San Francisco	Temple Club	2,500
Estimate total				9,100

=== DJ HYO 2024 Summer USA Tour ===
Tour dates
Date	Country	City	Venue
June 28, 2024 (Note: This concert is part of Summerfest.)	United States	Milwaukee	Henry Maier Festival Park
June 29, 2024	United States	Boston	Royale Boston
August 23, 2024	United States	Seattle	ORA Nightclub
August 24, 2024	United States	Costa Mesa	Time Nightclub
August 29, 2024	United States	Houston	Warehouse Live Midtown
August 30, 2024	United States	New York City	Pier 15 NYC
August 31, 2024	United States	Chicago	TAO Nightclub
September 1, 2024 (Note: This concert is part of North Coast Music Festival.)	United States	Chicago	SeatGeek Stadium

=== DJ HYO 2025 Summer USA Tour ===
Tour dates
Date	Country	City	Venue
July 11, 2025	United States	San Francisco	Temple
July 12, 2025	United States	Los Angeles	Los Angeles State Historic Park
July 18, 2025	United States	New York City	Racket
July 19, 2025	United States	Denver	Temple Denver

=== DJ HYO 2026 Summer USA Tour ===
Tour dates
Date	Country	City	Venue
July 10, 2026	United States	Los Angeles	Electrik Seoul LA, Exchange L.A.
July 11, 2026	United States	San Francisco	Electrik Seoul SF, The Midway
July 12, 2026 (Note: This concert is part of Lost in Dreams Festival.)	United States	Los Angeles	Los Angeles State Historic Park
July 17, 2026	United States	San Diego	Electrik Seoul SD, Nova
July 18, 2026	United States	Denver	Electrik Seoul, The Church Nightclub
