= San Francisco LovEvolution =

Festival in San Francisco

LovEvolution
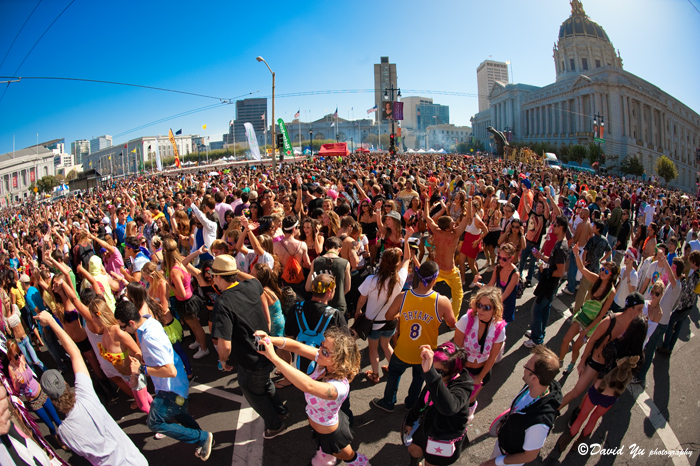
- LovEvolution 2009
- Genre: Electronic dance music
- Dates: late September and early October
- Locations: San Francisco Bay Area, California
- Years active: 2004-2009 (free); 2011 (paid)
- Attendance: 100,000 (2009)
- Website: Official site

LovEvolution (formerly San Francisco LovEvolution and San Francisco LoveFest) was a technoparade and festival that occurred annually in the Bay Area in late September and early October. From its inception in 2004 to 2009, the parade included 25 floats and started at San Francisco's 2nd and Market Streets. The parade continued all the way to San Francisco Civic Center Plaza. The 2009 parade drew over 100,000 people.

== History ==
The parade has its origins in Berlin's Loveparade which began in 1989. In 2003, the city denied the parade a permit and the event moved to San Francisco. In 2004, when German organizers were able to secure permits back in Berlin, North American organizers decided to continue their own event and dubbed it the LoveFest. In 2009 the name was changed to LovEvolution to avoid confusion with a similarly named electronic music event in LA.

In 2009 the permit for LovEvolution was revoked by officials in San Francisco citing safety concerns. Unable to find a suitable venue after the permits were revoked the event was cancelled in 2010 and moved to Oakland the following year and became a paid event. Since 2011 the parade has not been held and its website states it is looking for a venue.

Artists who have performed at LovEvolution Afterparty in previous years include Deadmau5, Above & Beyond, DJ Rap, Kaskade, ATB, Armin Van Buuren, Ferry Corsten, Gabriel & Dresden, Kyau & Albert, Deep Voices, Dave Dresden, Green Velvet, Paul Oakenfold, Guy Fieri, Christopher Lawrence, Junkie XL, Andy Moor, Bad Boy Bill, DJ Dan, Donald Glaude, Dieselboy, Aphrodite, DJ Sasha, John 00 Fleming, Eddie Halliwell, DJ Icey, Mr. Becker, Sector -7G and Robert Nickson.

== Gallery ==
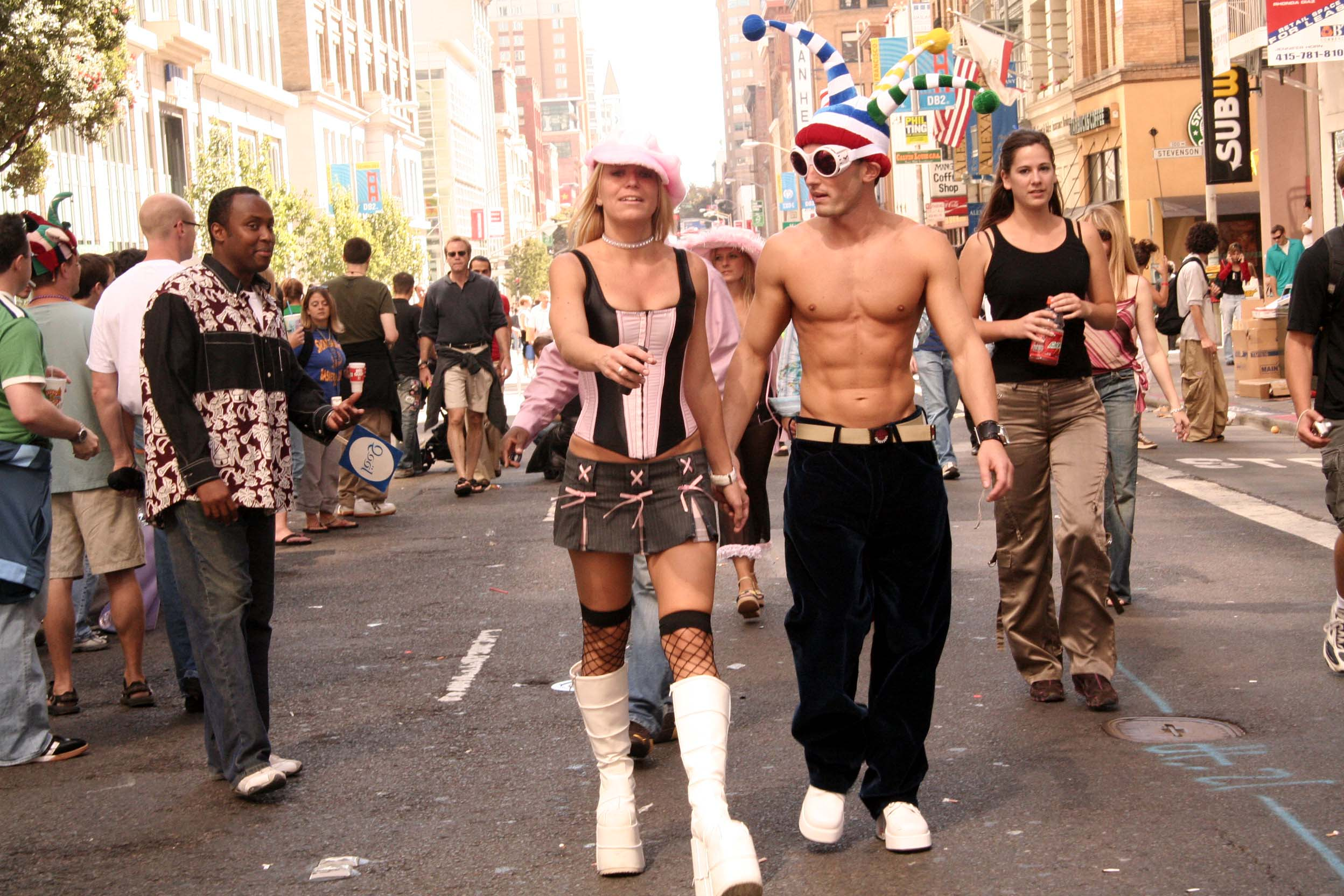
2005

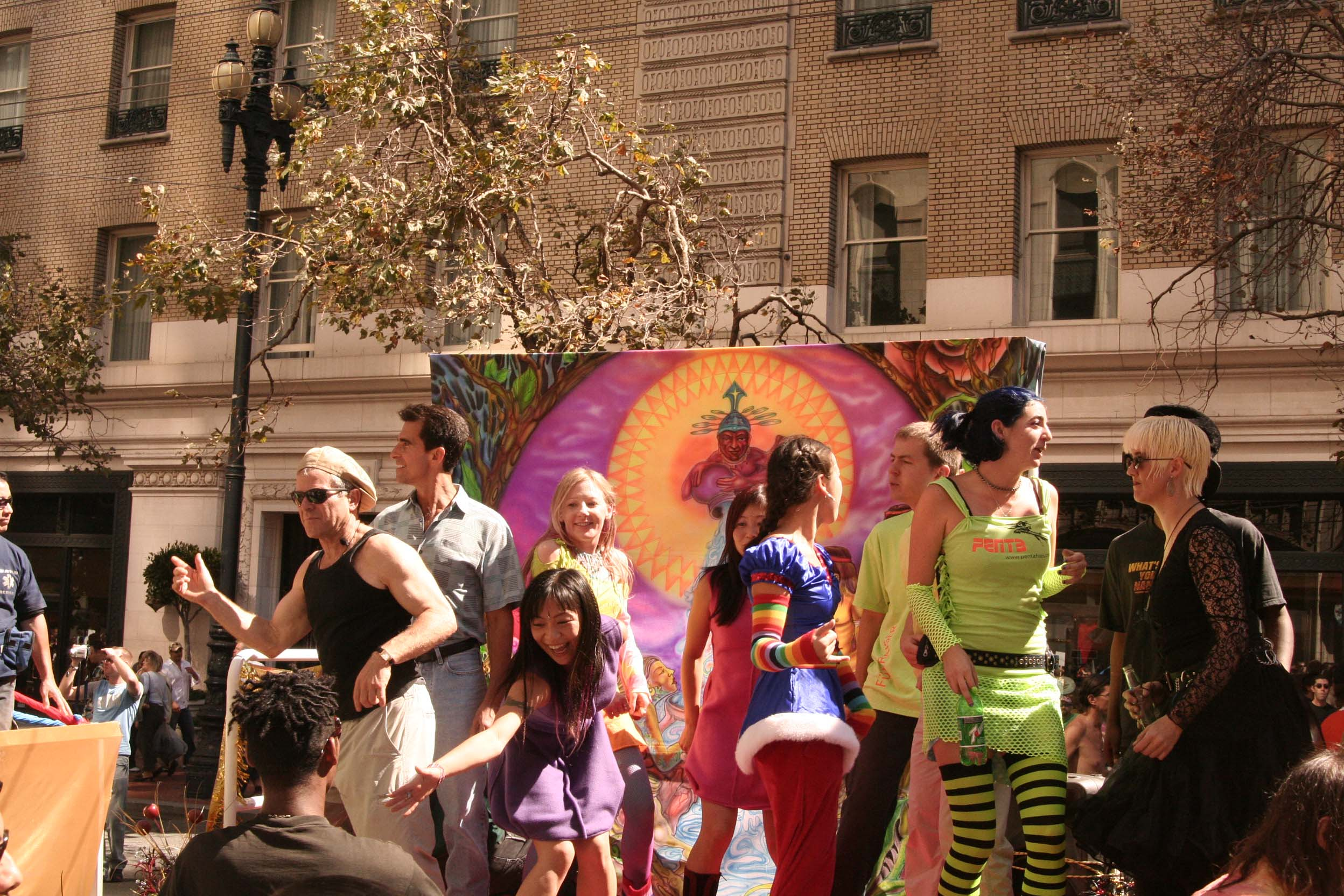
2005

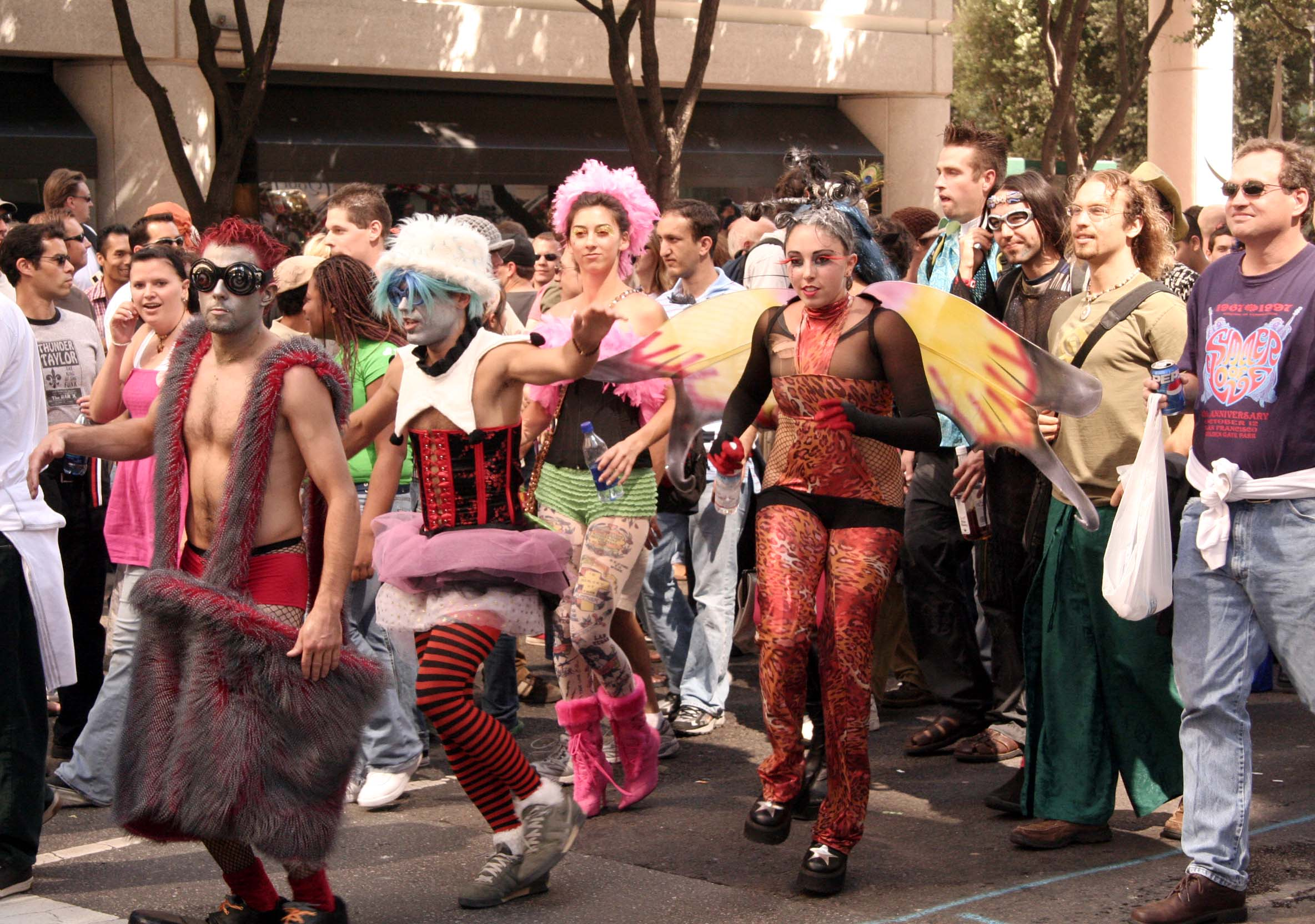
2005

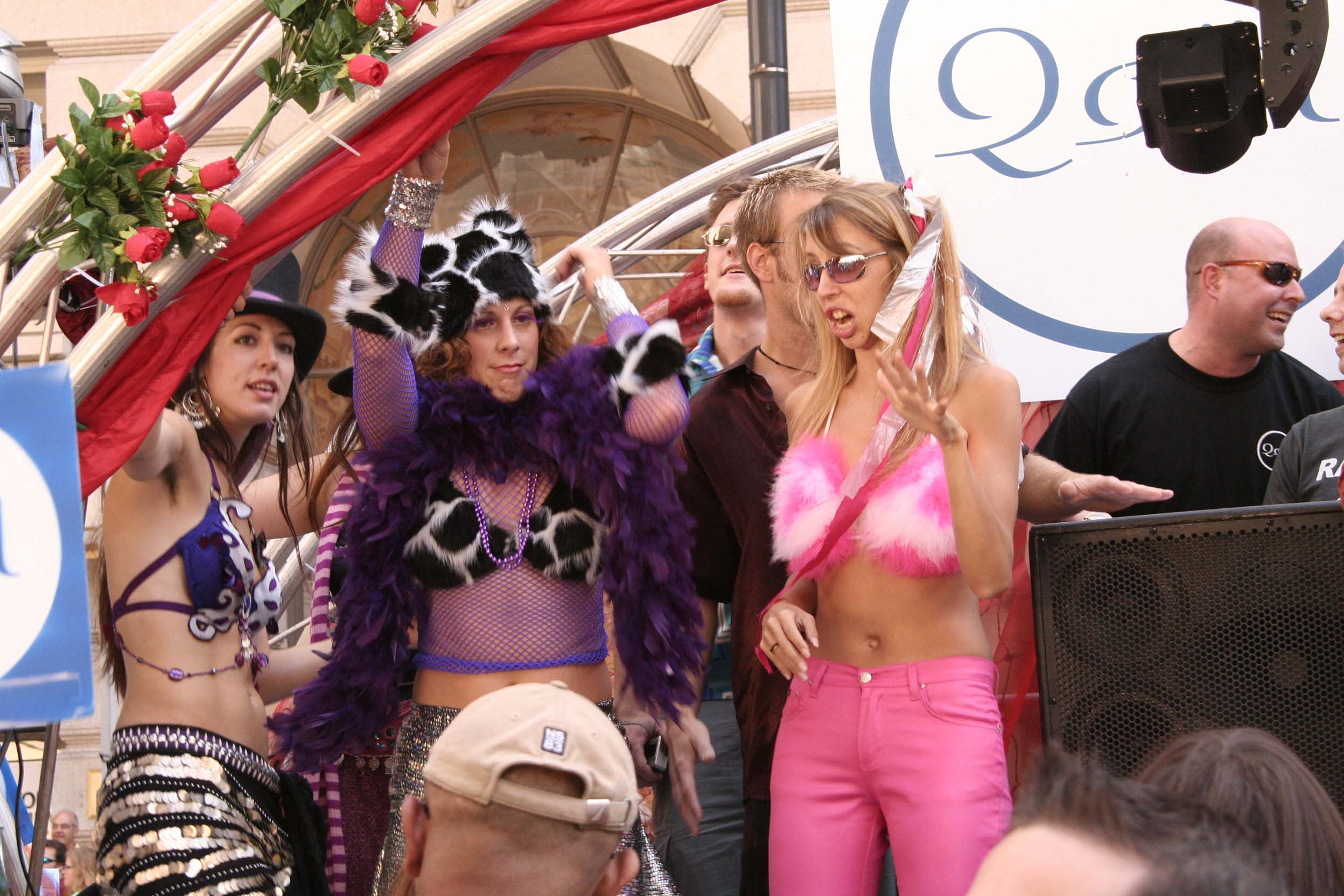
2005

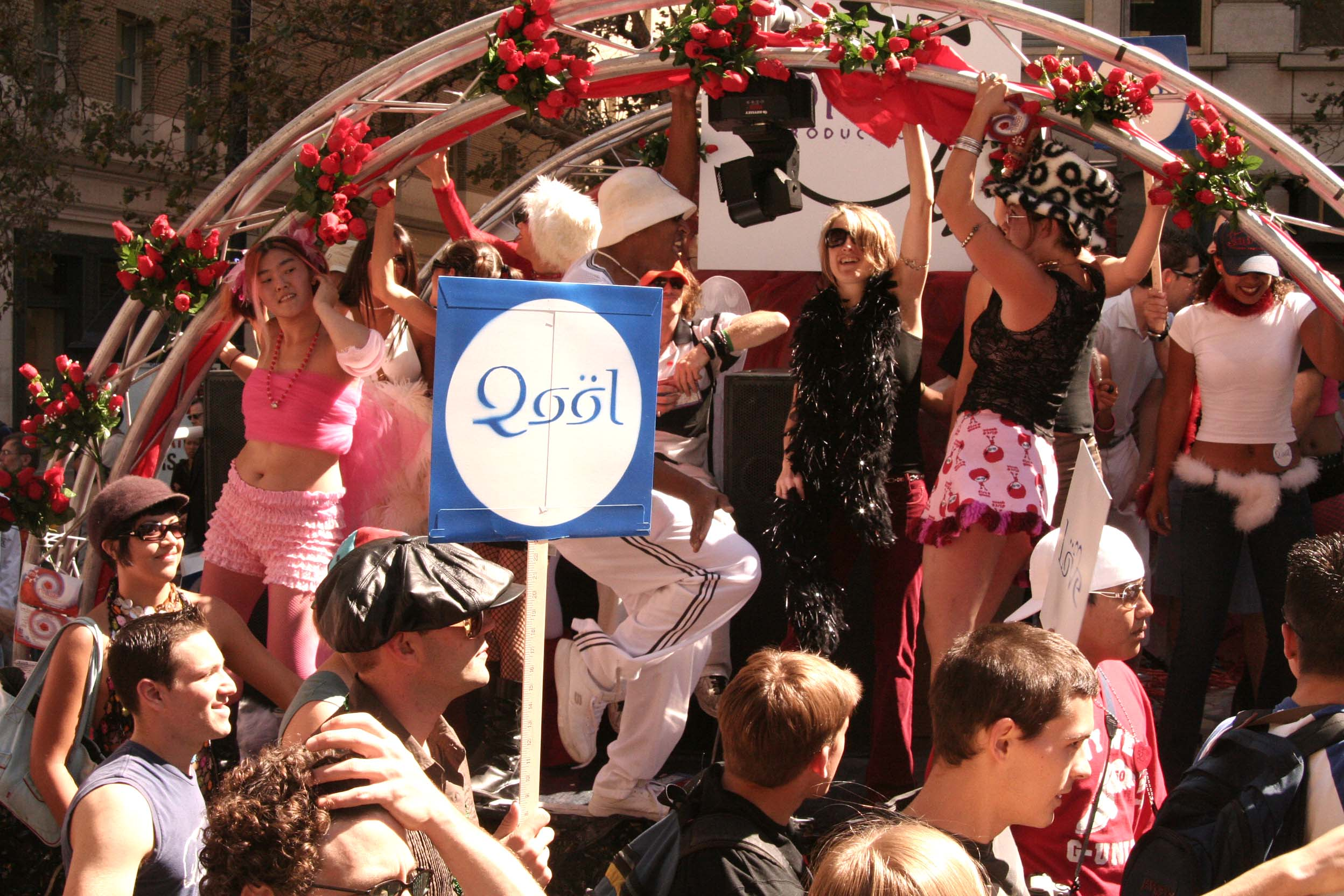
2005

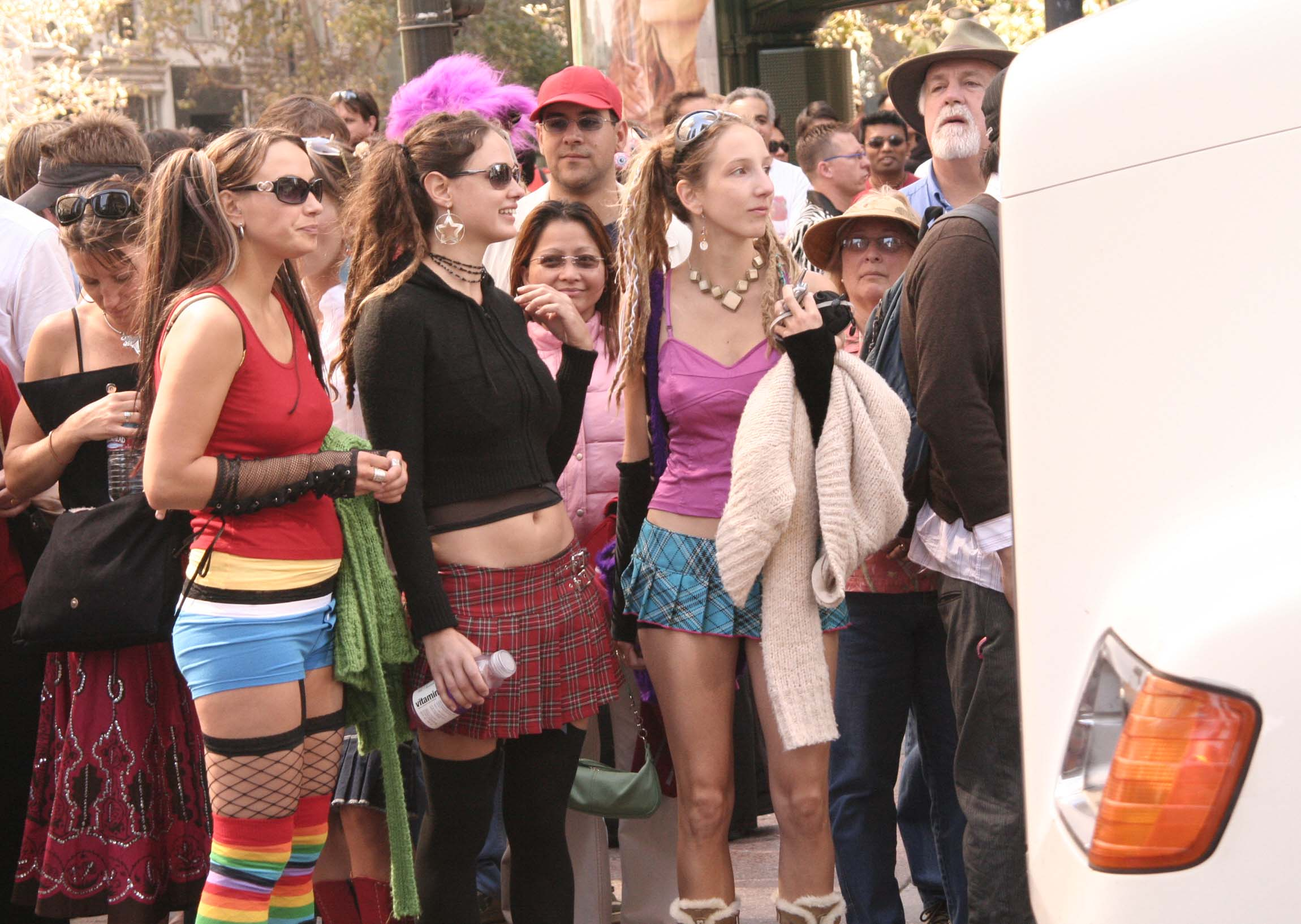
2005

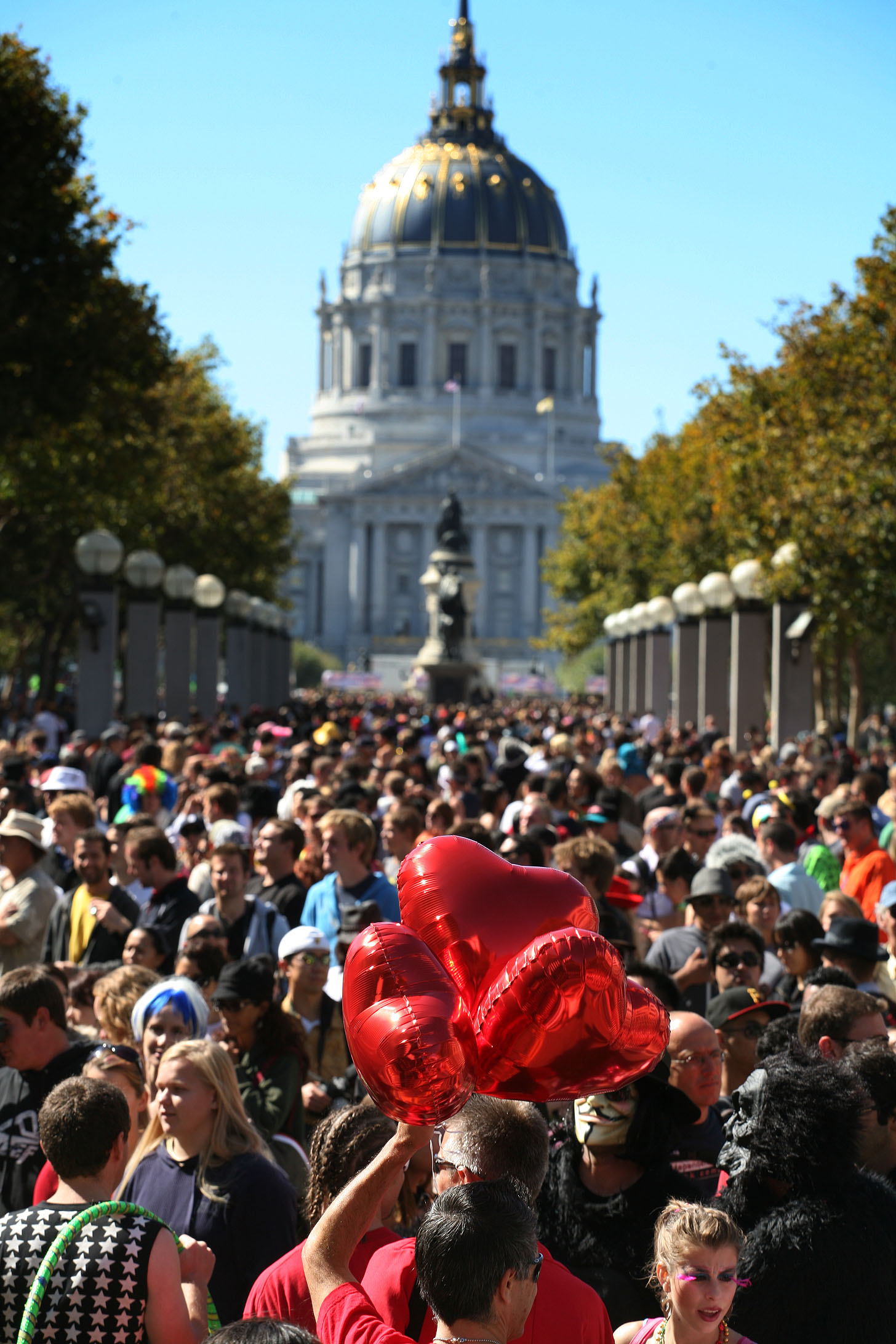
2008

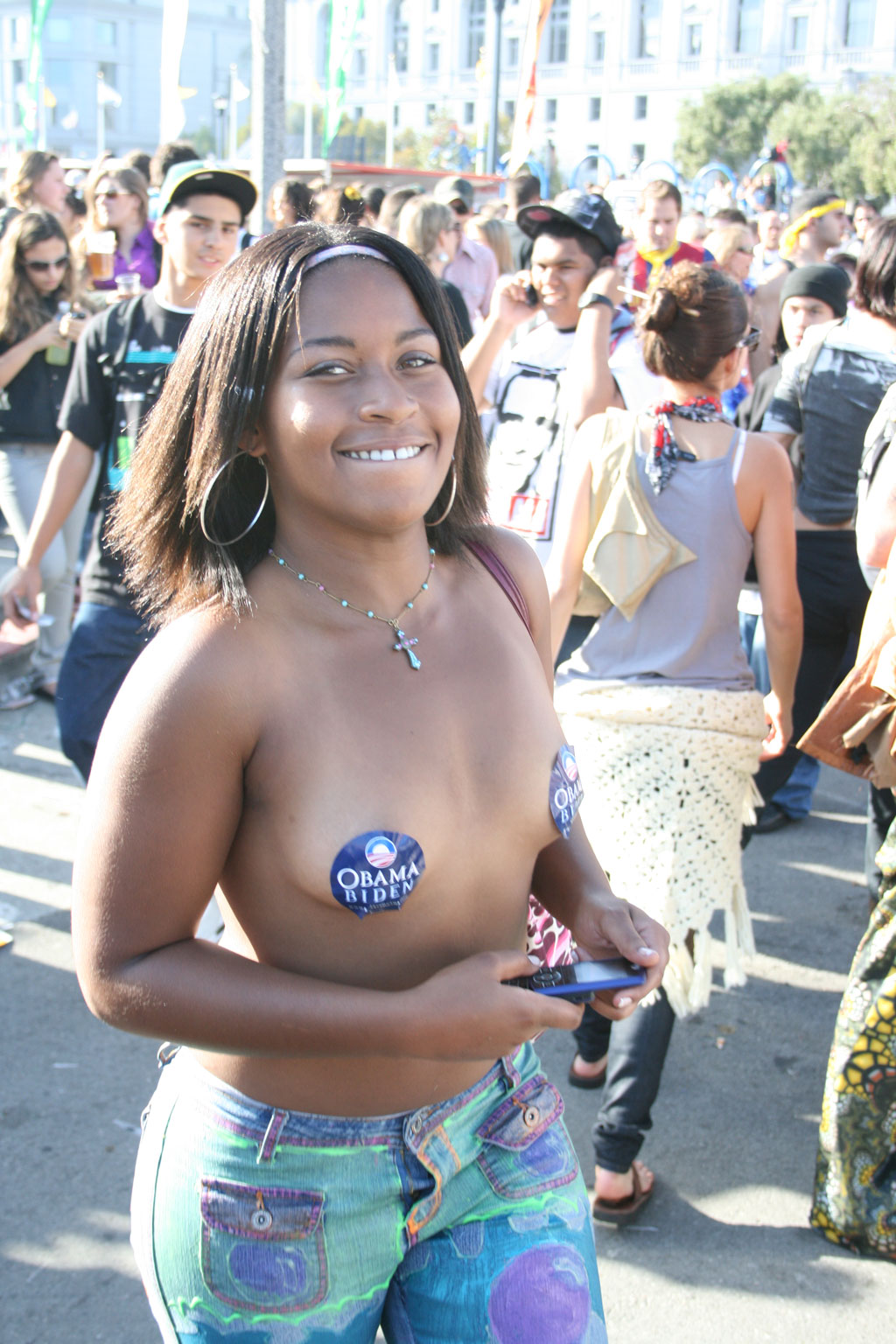
2008

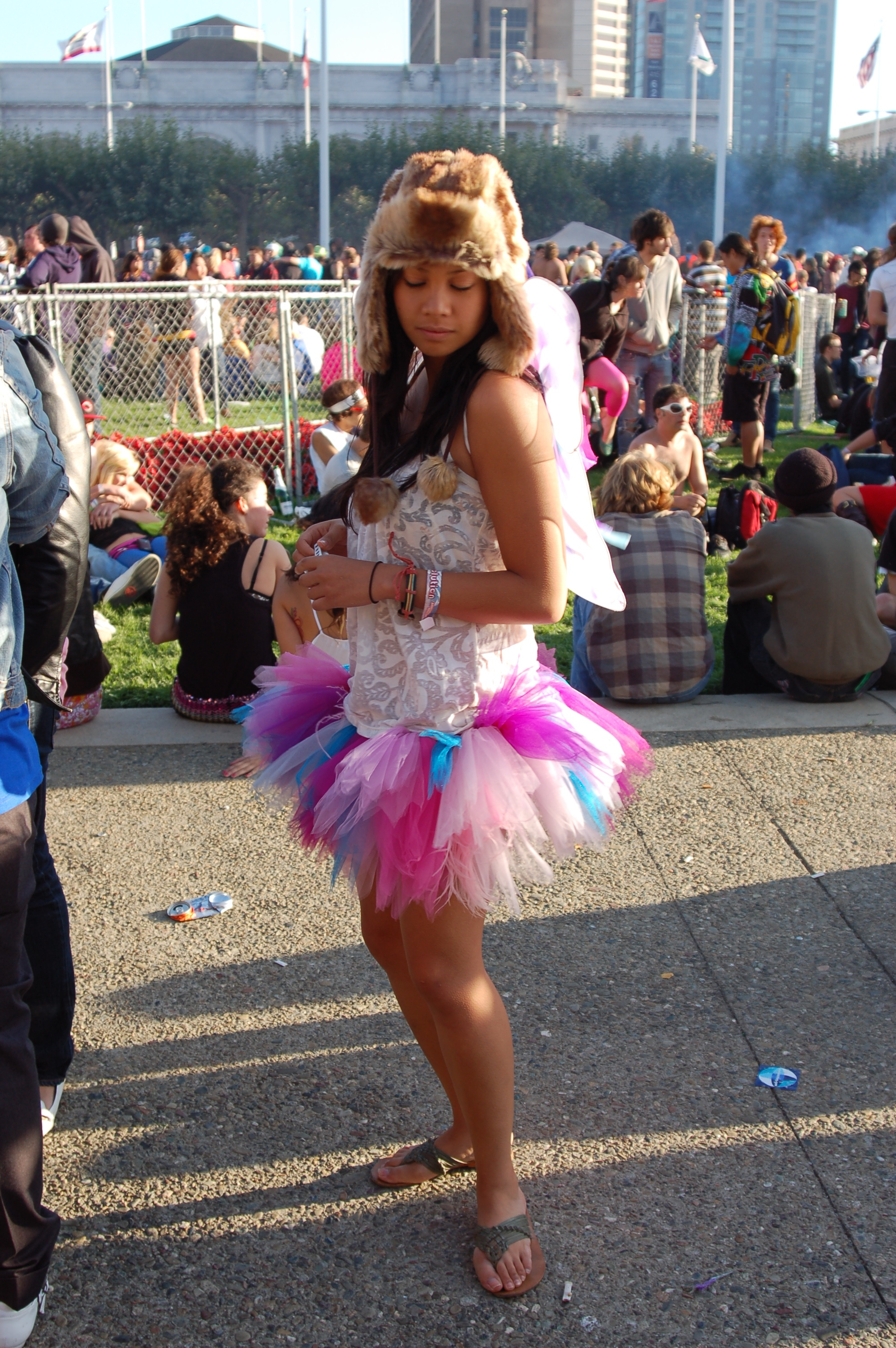
2009

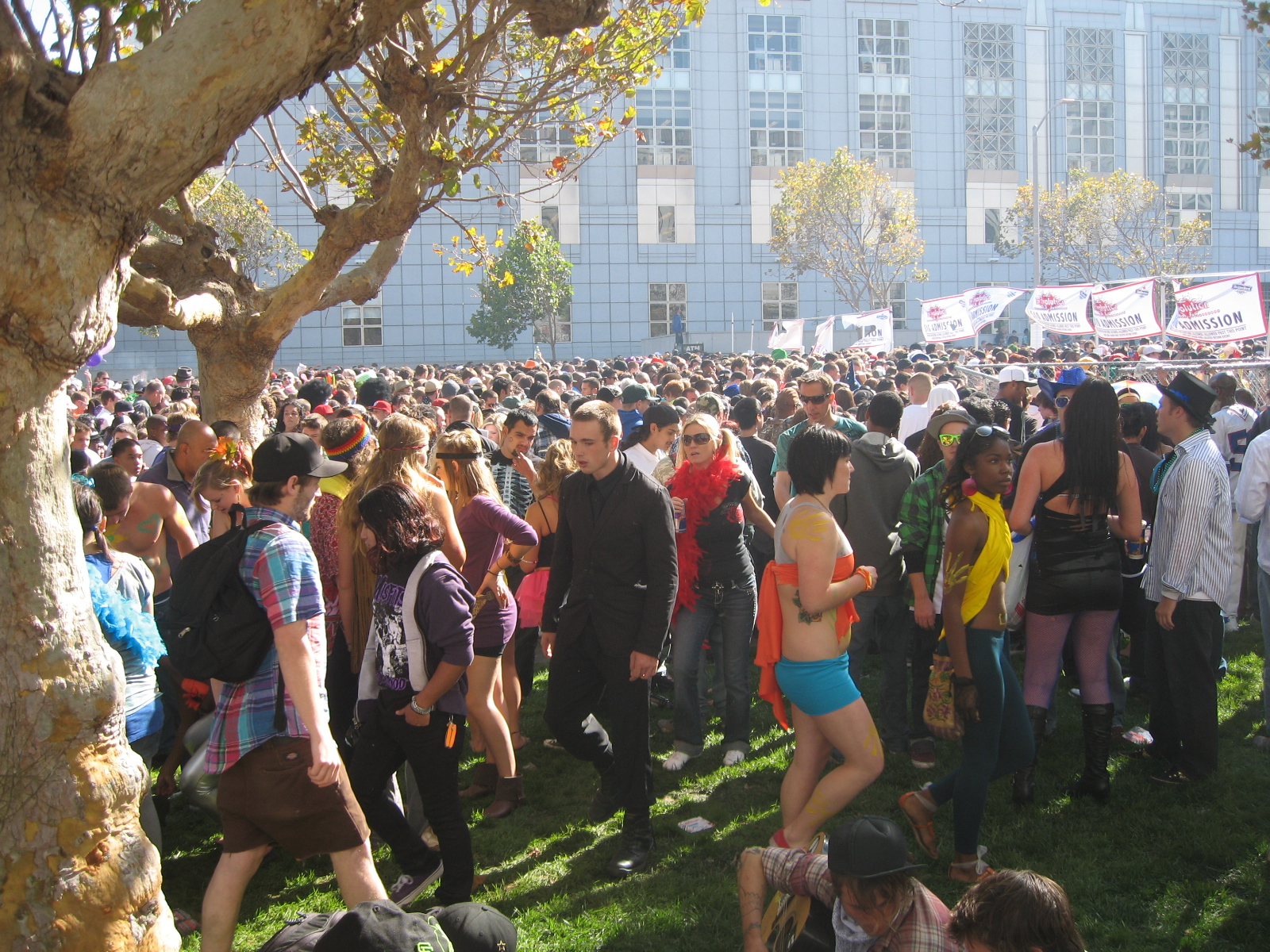
2009

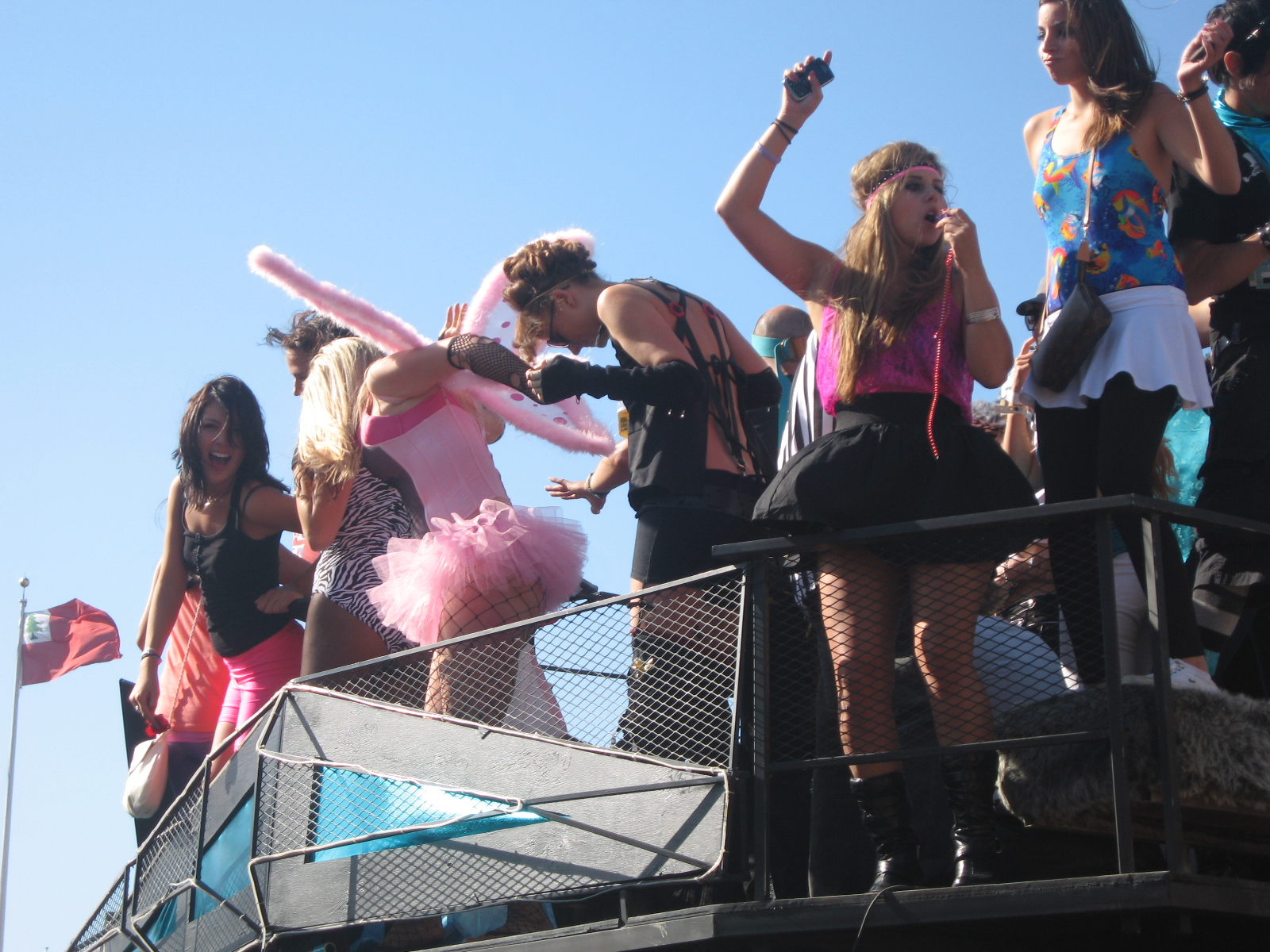
2009

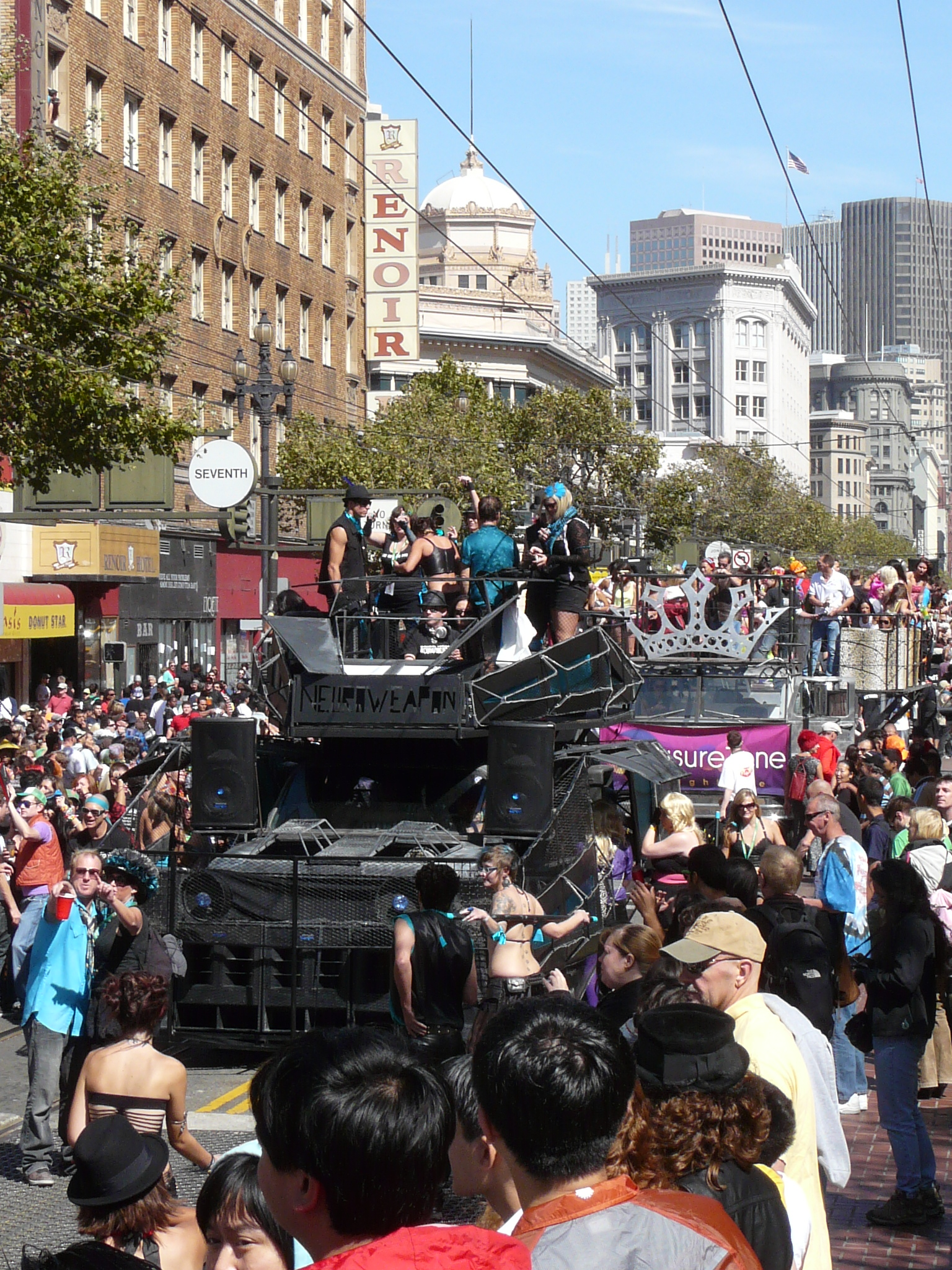
2009

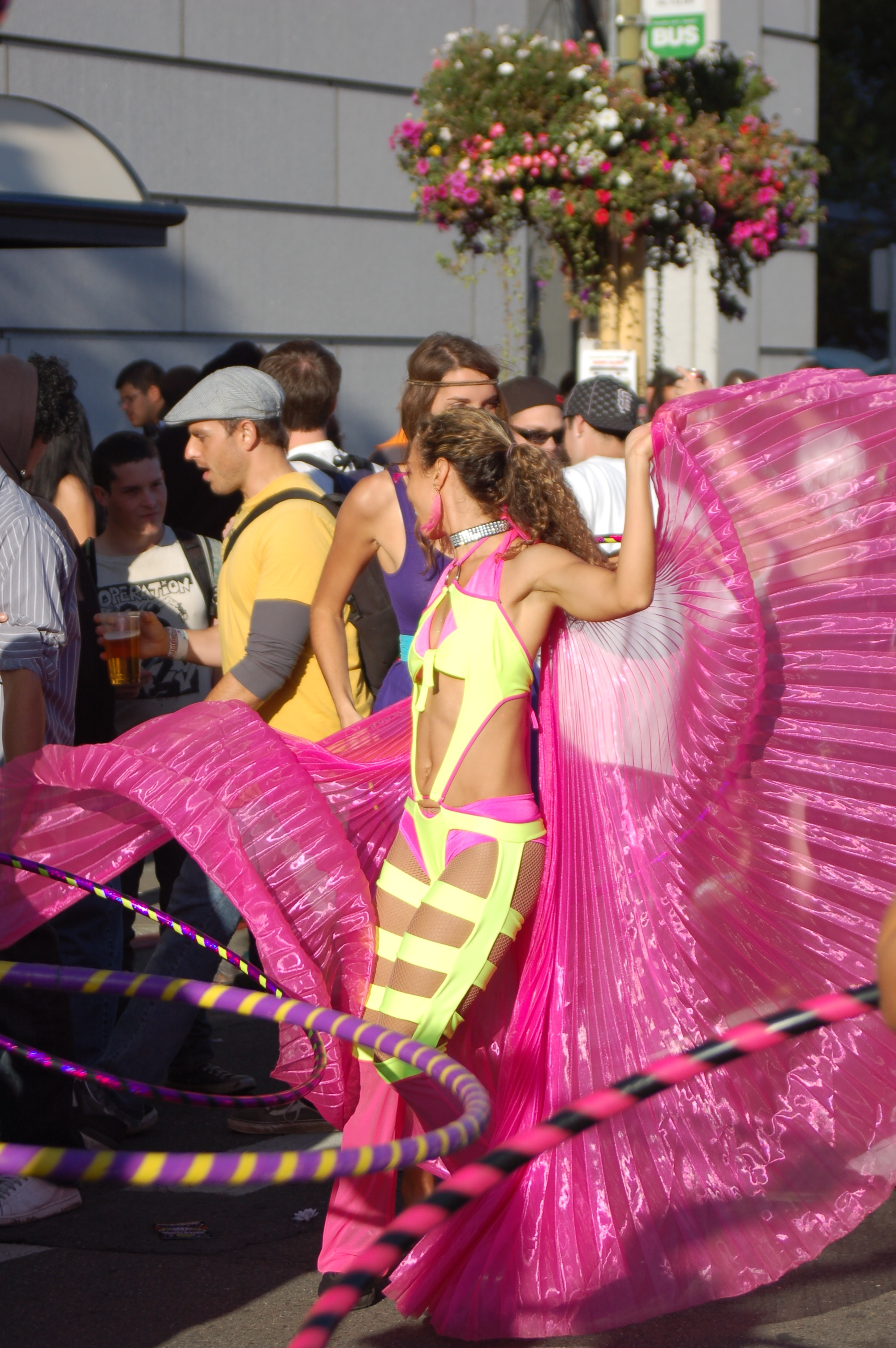
2009

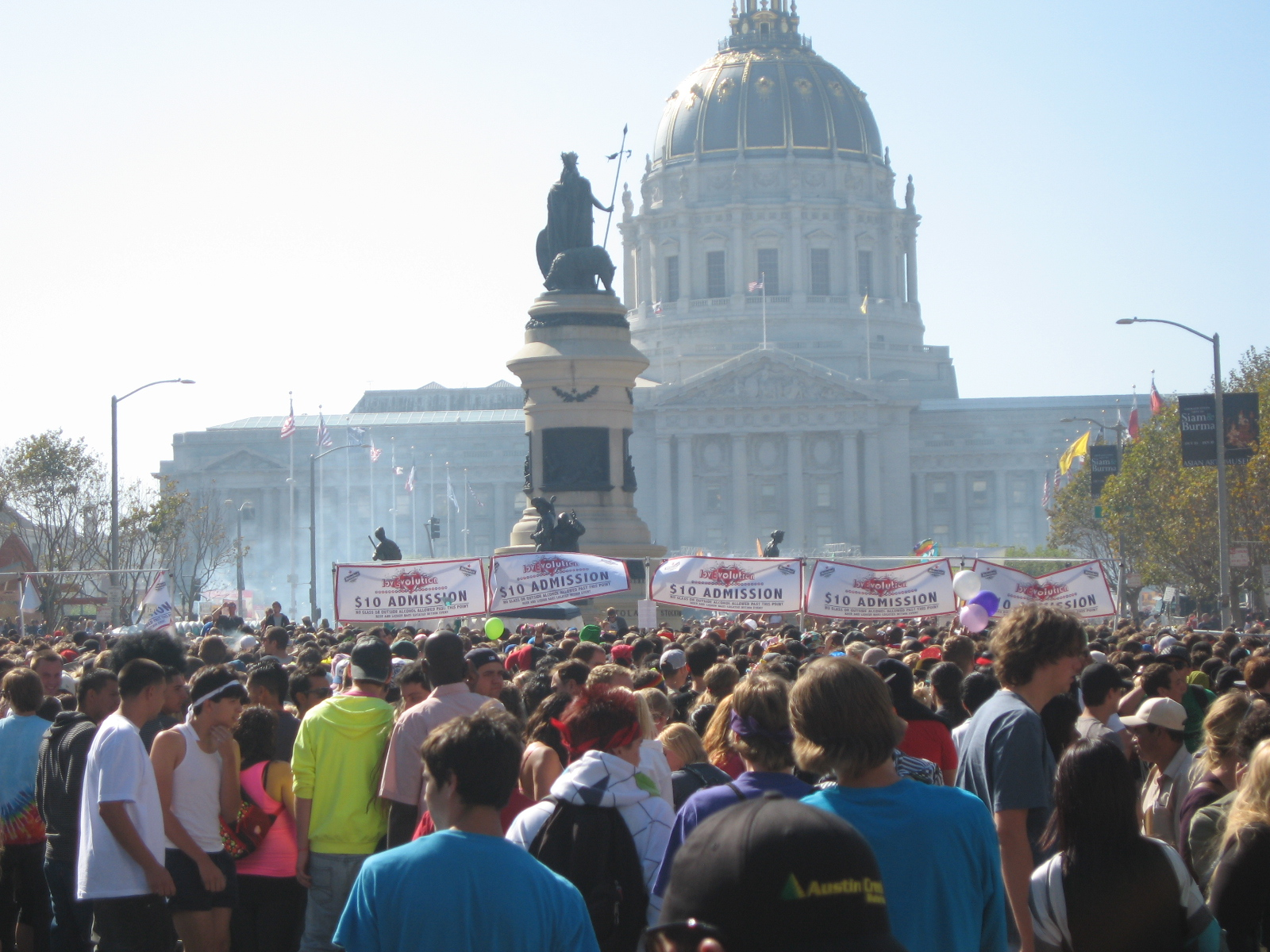
2009 $10

== See also ==
- How Weird Street Faire (annual electronic music festival in San Francisco)
- List of electronic music festivals
- List of technoparades
