= Joe's Special =

American egg, spinach and beef dish

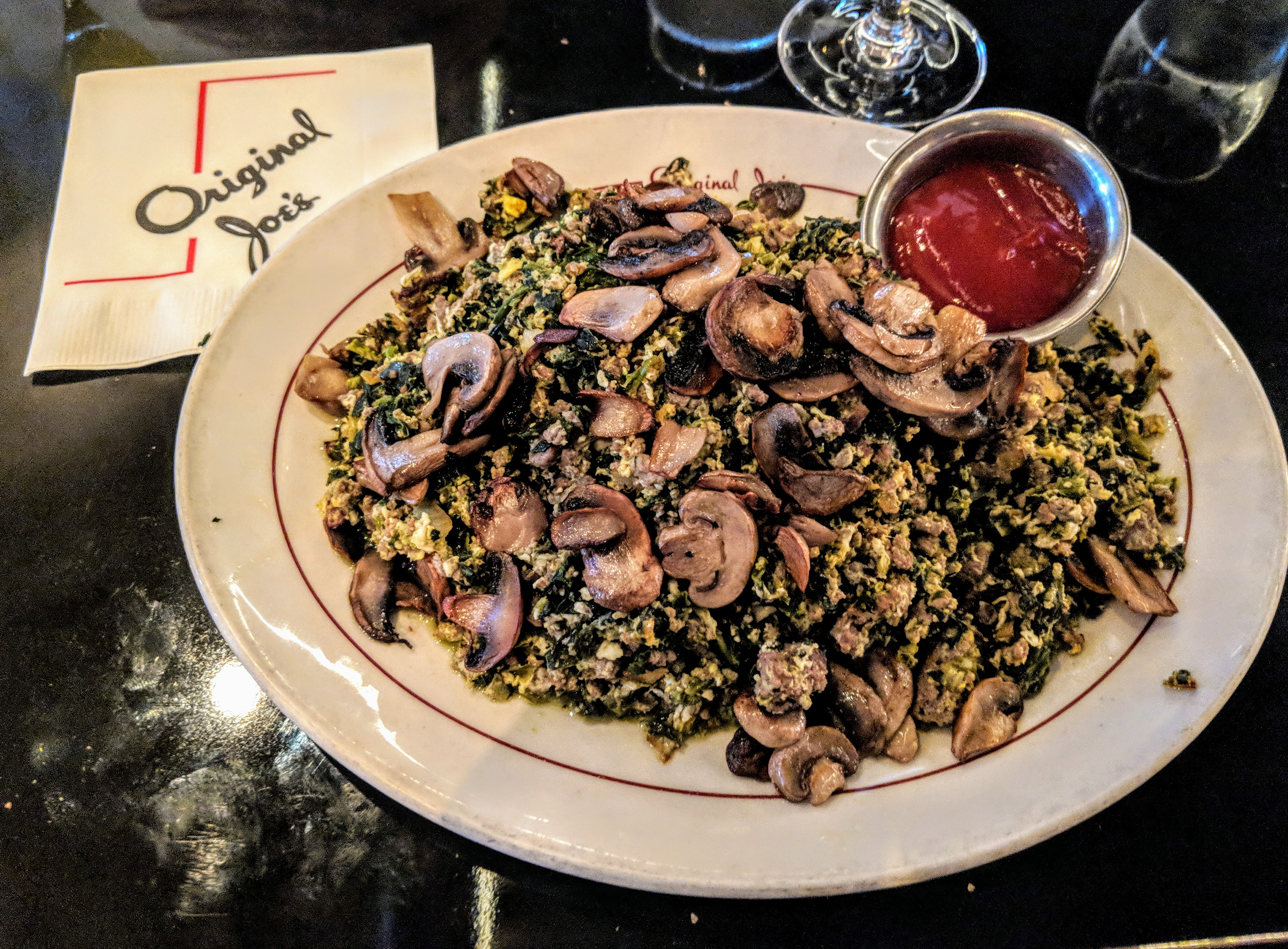
- Place of origin: United States
- Region or state: San Francisco
- Created by: Original Joe's
- Main ingredients: Eggs, spinach and ground beef
- Ingredients generally used: Onions, garlic and sometimes mushrooms, and various spices
- Variations: Italian Joe's, Mexican Joe's

Joe's Special is a dish that originated in San Francisco. It always includes eggs, spinach and ground beef. Other common ingredients include onions, garlic and sometimes mushrooms, and various spices. It is a scramble.

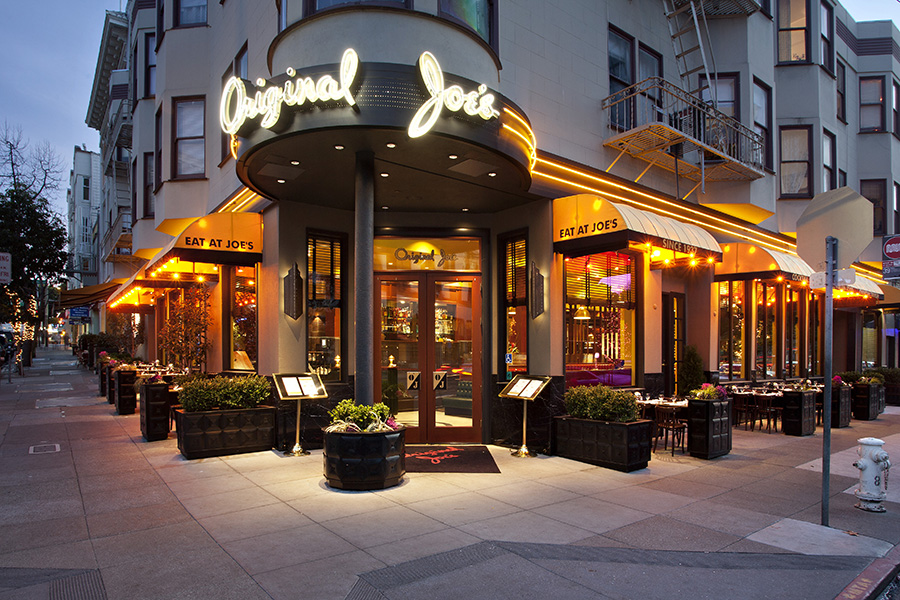
Original Joes in San Francisco

Although the dish has been served for decades at many restaurants throughout the San Francisco Bay Area including several with "Joe's" as part of their names, it was popularized by Original Joe's, a restaurant in San Francisco's Tenderloin District. During World War II, a serving cost 75 cents. When Original Joe's relocated to the North Beach neighborhood following a fire, San Francisco mayor Ed Lee issued a proclamation calling the Joe's Special "famous".

As a dinner entree, the dish can be served with slices of toasted sourdough bread spread with garlic butter, or on a bed of rice or pasta. It is also sometimes served as a breakfast dish. Ketchup or Tabasco sauce are common condiments.

Variations include Italian Joe's, which includes Italian sausage as the meat component, and Mexican Joe's, which includes chorizo instead of ground beef.
