= Theatre Bay Area =

Theatre Bay Area (TBA) is a non-profit organization founded in 1976. Its mission is to unite, strengthen and promote the theatre community in the San Francisco Bay Area.

TBA is the largest regional theatre service organization in North America, around 2,000 individual artist and 300 theatre company members.

The San Francisco Bay Area is the third largest theatre center in the country, with more than 400 companies in 12 counties. The region has more theatre companies per capita than almost any other metropolitan area in the U.S. and is home to the third largest community of Equity (union) actors, following New York City and Chicago. Some 200 new plays are premiered in San Francisco each year, many going on to wider success at large.

Theatre Bay Area's membership is derived from 12 Bay Area counties (the 9 counties plus Santa Cruz, Monterey, and San Joaquin counties) and consists of more than 365 Bay Area theatre and dance companies, from multimillion-dollar organizations to grassroots community groups; some 3,000 individuals, including actors, directors, designers, playwrights, technicians and theatre patrons; and more than 100 organizational members, from libraries and universities to theatre industry professional services.

Theatre Bay Area's most prominent programs include TIX Bay Area, Theatre Bay Area magazine, and re-granting programs for emerging theatre companies and local theatre artists.

== TIX Bay Area ==
TIX Bay Area was a walk-up box office, located on Union Square, San Francisco, California. It closed in September, 2019.

== Theatre Bay Area Magazine ==
The first issue, a mimeographed single page, appeared in January 1976 (it took the name Callboard four months later). The single page turned into a couple of stapled pages. In September 1987, under Theatre Bay Area's executive director and Callboard managing editor Deborah Allen, the publication grew to a 7-inch-by-11-inch format.

In 1987, one color was added. The September 1988 issue was Jean Schiffman's first as editor. (She was previously the organization's communications director, and before that a publications associate.) Belinda Taylor became editor in June 1993 and by October 1993 had completely redesigned the magazine. The result is the roughly 8.5-inch-by-11-inch magazine Theatre Bay Area Magazine has today.

The name Callboard was changed to Theatre Bay Area Magazine in January 2004 in an attempt to more accurately reflect its content. The magazine has up to date audition listings that Callboard got its start publishing in 1976, and also covers stories and articles about the Bay Area theatre scene and theatre in general.

The magazine transferred to a digital format beginning with its September / October 2013 edition.
