= Original Joe's =

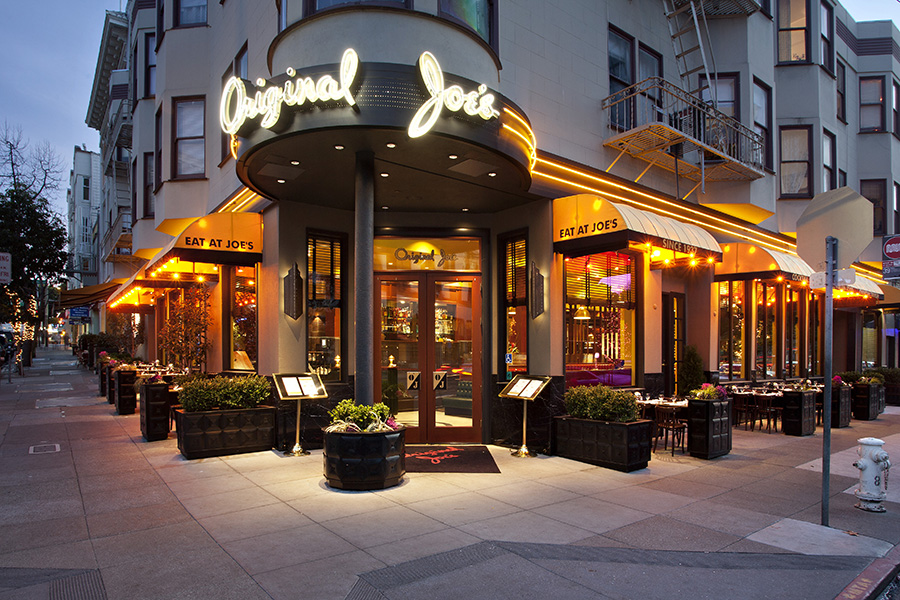
- Interactive map of Original Joe's

Restaurant information
- Established: 1937
- Food type: Italian cuisine
- Location: 601 Union Street, San Francisco, California, 94133, United States
- Coordinates: 37°48′0.9″N 122°24′41.52″W
- Seating capacity: 250
- Other information: Phone: 1.415.775.4877
- Website: originaljoes.com

Original Joe's is a local chain of restaurants in the North Beach neighborhood of San Francisco and the Westlake neighborhood of Daly City. They serve a wide variety of foods, mostly Italian-American cuisine with some mainstream American favorites. Their "signature" dishes include Joe's Special, Chicken Parmigiana, the Joe's Famous Hamburger Sandwich and a variety of steaks and chops.

== Original Joe's San Francisco ==
The first Original Joe's was established by a Croatian immigrant, Ante "Tony" Rodin in 1937. The restaurant was originally located at 144 Taylor Street in San Francisco's Tenderloin neighborhood, and initially consisted of a 14-stool counter on a saw-dust covered floor. As business grew, Rocca and Rodin leased a vacant space next to them, which allowed the addition of a full dining room. Later, more space became available next to the dining room enabling the addition of a full bar, which resulted in its final size. It was known for serving people from all walks of life "from the head politician to the head prostitute"; serving old-fashioned, Italian-American fare, the restaurant prepared dishes in an open kitchen.

In 2007, Original Joe's closed due to a fire that began in the restaurant's flue just before lunchtime. The blaze affected the eatery and the single-room occupancy (SRO) hotel upstairs, and the damage to the property was too extensive for the restaurant to resume operating at that location. After years of delays involving insurance and other financial matters, the restaurant reopened in a new location in the North Beach neighborhood in 2012, under the ownership and operation of Tony Rodin's grandchildren. The location was previously occupied by Joe DiMaggio's and Fior d'Italia. The original Tenderloin location is slated to be marked by one of nine commemorative plates throughout the neighborhood recognizing locations of historical significance.

San Francisco Mayor Ed Lee declared January 26 as "Original Joe's Day".

== Original Joe's Westlake ==
Joe's of Westlake closed at the end of January 2014 since its inception in 1956 by Bruno Scatena, a former business partner of Tony Rodin at Original Joe's in San Francisco.

In the early 1980s, Bruno Scatena's daughter assumed management responsibilities of the restaurant after her father's death. When she realized she could no longer operate the restaurant herself, she arranged to sell the building and land to the Duggan Family in 2014. After a two-year closure for extensive front-to-back renovations, the restaurant re-opened in February 2016 as the brand's second location and dubbed Original Joe's Westlake.

== Original Joe's San Jose ==
The Original Joe's San Jose is the oldest remaining restaurant in the former Original Joe's local chain, however since 1980 it has been independently owned (from the San Francisco and Westlake locations) and it is technically not affiliated anymore.

== Awards and accolades ==
- 2018, San Francisco Chronicle Top 100 Brunch 2018|SF Chronicle - Top 100 - Brunch
- 2018, San Francisco Chronicle Michael Bauer - Five Favorite Burgers
- 2017, SF Gate Most San Francisco Restaurants
- 2017, American City Business Journals San Francisco's 5 favorite restaurants
- 2017, Zagat 9 SF Bay Area Restaurant Families You Need to Know
- 2017, PureWow Things Every San Franciscan Must Add to Their Foodie Bucket List
- 2016, SF Weekly Eat: Original Joe's of Westlake
- 2016, San Francisco Chronicle Top 10 new restaurants of 2016
- 2016, Harpers Bazaar 88 Things to Do and See in San Francisco
- 2016, Eater The Best Family-Owned Restaurants in the US
- 2015, SF Gate Best dishes
- 2014, 7x7 San Francisco's Best Old-School Restaurants
- 2013, Conde Nast San Francisco's Best New Restaurants
- 2012, Inside Scoop SF - Mayor Ed Lee declares today Original Joe's Day
