= Bi-Rite Market =

Grocery store in San Francisco, California

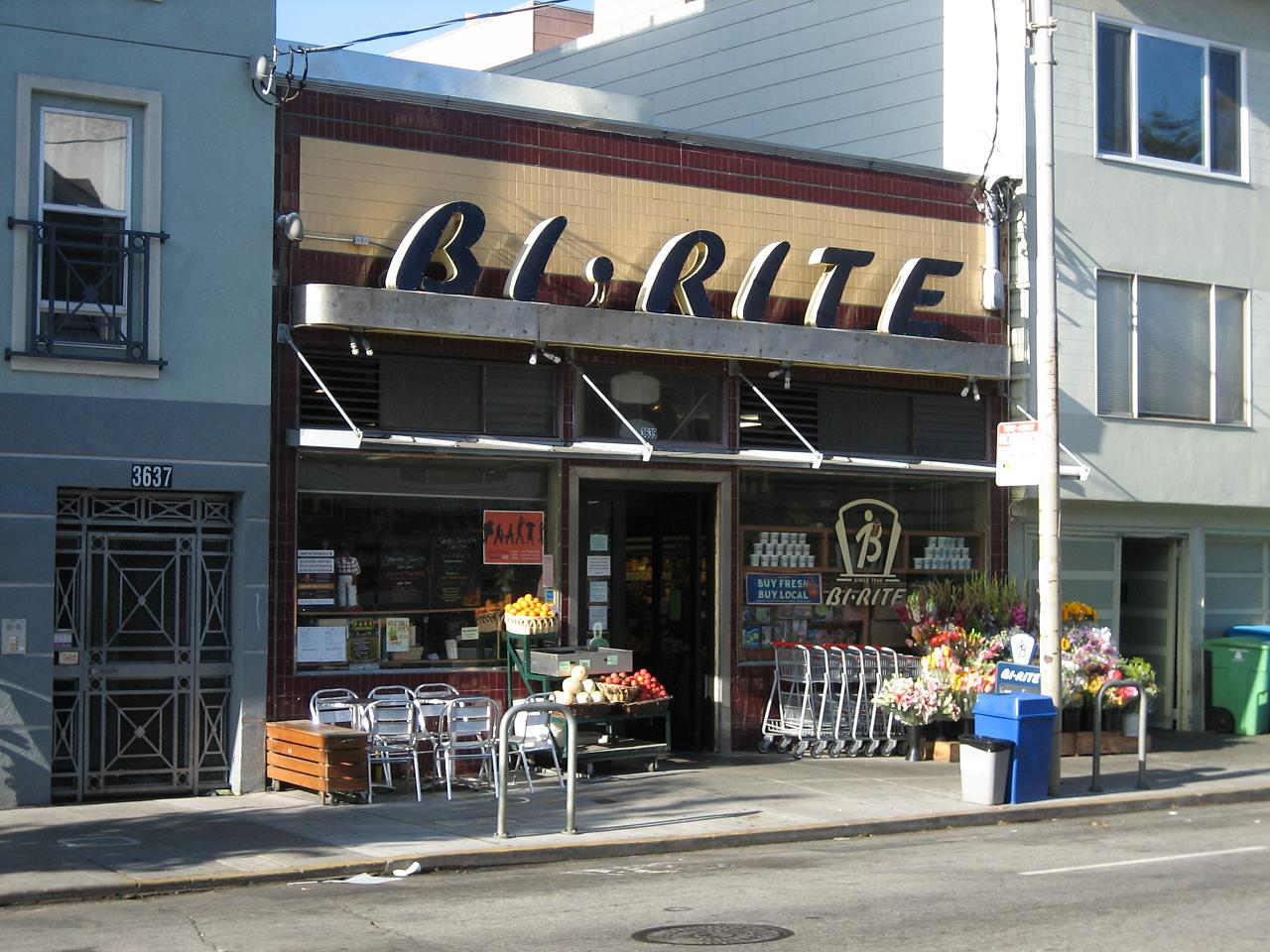
The original Bi-Rite Market in the Mission District

Bi-Rite Market (stylized as Bi·Rite) is a grocery store chain with three locations in San Francisco, California. It is owned and operated by Sam Mogannam, who took over the original grocery store from his family in 1997 with his brother Raphael Mogannam. The store is known for its prepared foods made using locally grown produce.

== History ==
The original Bi-Rite Market was established in San Francisco's Mission District in 1940 by brothers Joe and Bill Cordano. In 1964, they sold the store to brothers Jack and Ned Mogannam. In 1997, Ned's sons Sam and Raphael took over the store.

Sam Mogannam spoke at TEDxPresidio 2012 on reinventing capitalism. Fast Company profiled him as one of the 100 most creative people in business for 2012. The market runs a non-profit community food education project, 18 Reasons. The store is a pioneer in the new farm-to-grocery store movement, and has published a book, Eat Good Food (Ten Speed Press). Whole Foods Market has sent staff to the store to adopt its practices. Bi-Rite earned certification as a B Corporation in late 2015 for its contribution to developing a more sustainable and inclusive economy. In 2018, Bi-Rite was named a Best for Community World Honoree by B-Lab.

== Locations ==
The original market opened in the Mission District in 1940. The second location, in the Divisadero Street Commercial District in the Western Addition neighborhood, opened in 2013. The third location, in Russian Hill, opened in 2024. A fourth location in the Richmond District is scheduled to open in 2027.
