= Temple (nightclub) =

Nightclub in San Francisco and Denver, United States

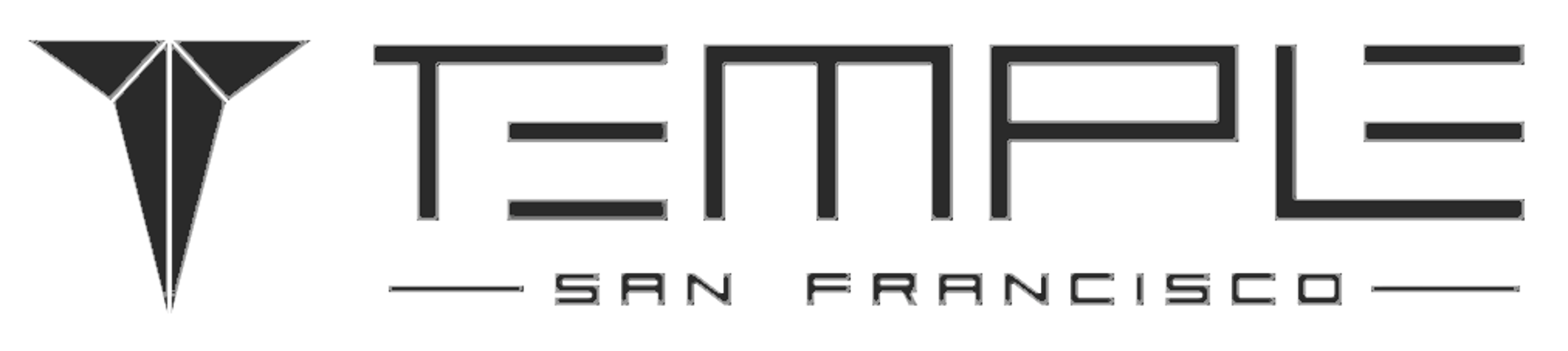

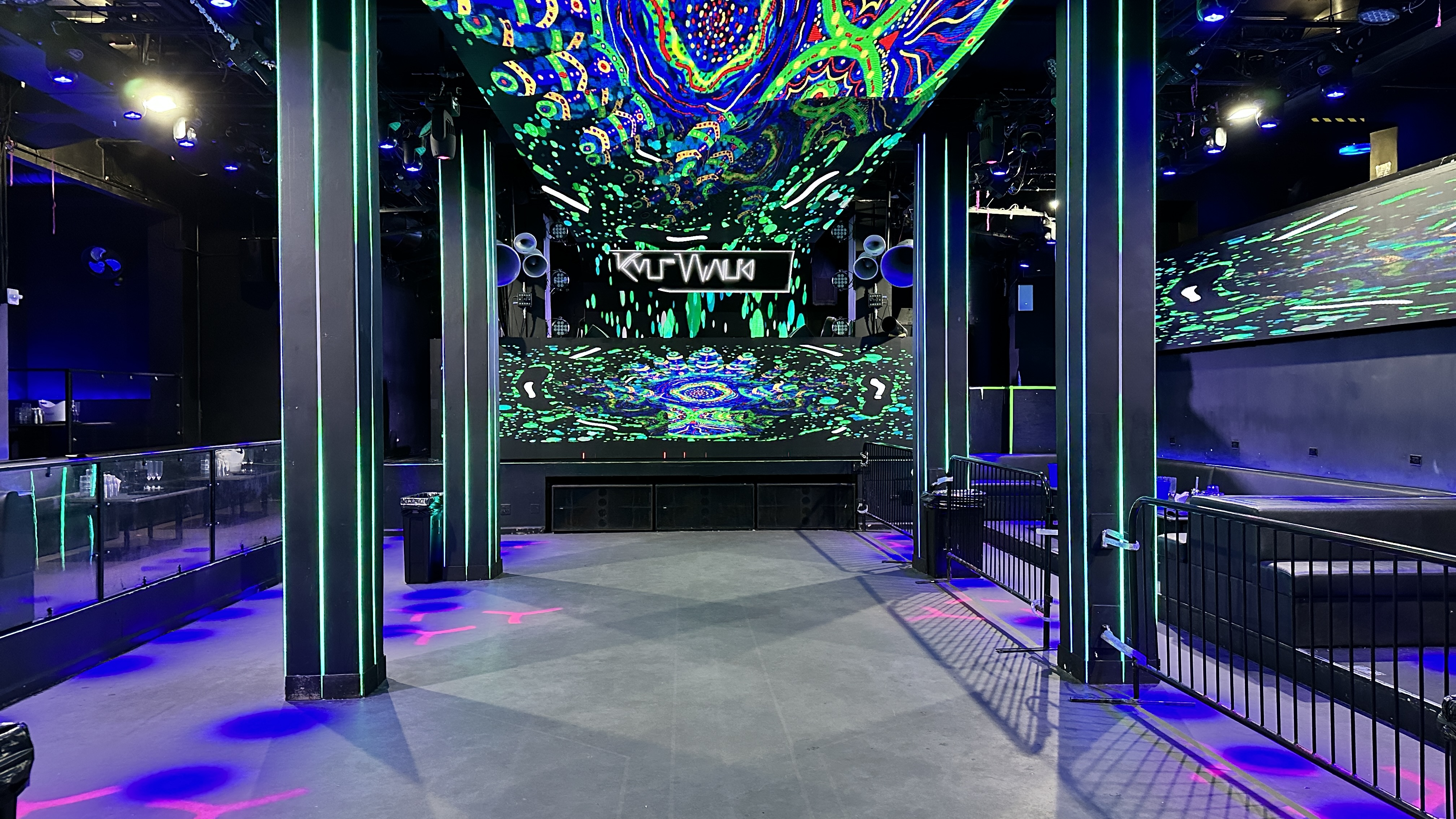
- Temple San Francisco's main room in 2023

General information
- Location: 540 Howard Street; San Francisco, California, United States
- Coordinates: 37.78796°N 122.39724°W
- Opened: 2007

Technical details
- Floor count: 4

Other information
- Public transit: 5/5R Fulton, 38/38R Geary, 7 Haight/Noriega; Montgomery Street, Embarcadero; Montgomery Street, Embarcadero

Website
- https://templesf.com

Temple is a nightclub first established in San Francisco, with an additional location in Denver. With a San Francisco location south of Market Street near the Salesforce Tower and Salesforce Transit Center, the club was opened in 2007 by entrepreneur Paul Hemming. Temple has been notable for being among the highest-grossing nightclubs by revenue in the San Francisco Bay Area in the early 2010s. The club is seen as a primary gathering place for technology industry figures in and near Silicon Valley entrepreneurs.

== History and venue structure ==
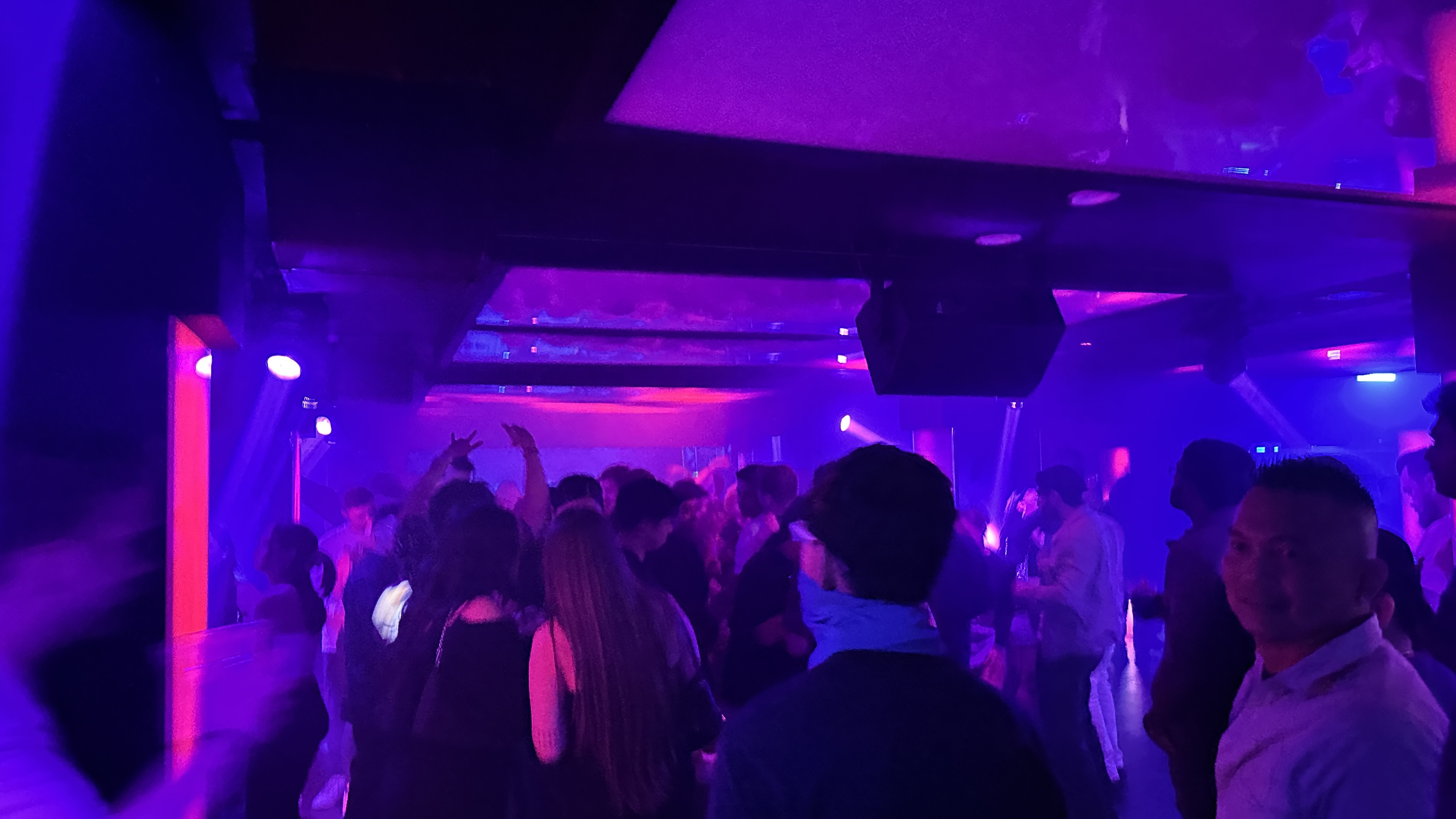
LVL 55, a separate nightclub part of the Temple venue

Temple was first opened in 2007 by Paul Hemming, opening at the former location of Club DV8. Hemming has stated his belief in nightclubs being a place where people can escape from reality, inspiring a spaceship theme into both the San Francisco and later Denver locations. Temple is noted for taking inspiration from 1980s science fiction films such as Tron and Blade Runner. Hemming also credits Burning Man with influencing the design of Temple, aiming to create an experience where people travel to a new world where "none of the rules on Earth apply". Temple's San Francisco location credits itself with having the first energy-generating dance floor in the United States, introduced in 2010, and Hemming eventually wishes to have all of his venues to not have to rely on electrical grids.

The club has traditionally been seen as a hotspot in San Francisco for tech industry figures. Due to many startups acquiring their first offices in warehouses south of Market Street, Temple's location poised it as a primary hangout spot for entrepreneurs during boom and bust cycles.

Temple's San Francisco location also opened LVL 55, a futuristically designed basement level which acts as its own separate club. Open to patrons of Temple during most nights, LVL 55 hosts 15 VIP booths and acts as a slower-room playing West Coast hip-hop whilst Temple's main room plays faster songs. The San Francisco location additionally hosts a rooftop bar, named the Skyline Lounge by Temple, which hosts events usually during the afternoon.

=== Incidents ===
Temple's reputation was severely damaged in 2011 after the club became the site of a brawl which knocked Joey Hernandez, a fourth-year medical student. Hernandez was knocked brain-dead by an object at Temple during an altercation between himself and three others. An organ donor, the homicide of Hernandez was coined by CBS News as the "oldest open homicide case" in San Francisco, due to the primary suspect, Richmond resident Dung Minh Nguyen, bailing out of jail and failing to be sent to trial by San Francisco's district attorneys.

Separately, a pending lawsuit filed in February 2024 alleged that on May 13, 2023, a customer was mugged by Temple's security guards. The customer, Kenneth Oyewole, alleges that Temple security approached him unprovoked, punched him in the face, and kicked him while Oyewole was on the ground before proceeding to steal his wallet and phone. Oyewole is demanding damages above $35,000 for several injuries and mental distress.

== Development ==
Temple's 2015 renovation, according to Architect Magazine, cost $2,000,000 and was completed by Deleap LLC for interior designs. The club spans 16,000 square feet.

== Revenue ==
In 2013, Temple was the 88th highest grossing club nationwide by estimated revenues, earning an estimated $5–$10 million; this also placed it as the second-highest grossing nightclub in San Francisco, trailing only 1015 Folsom which itself generated $10–$15 million. Two years later in 2015, Temple outperformed 1015 Folsom in revenue and became the Bay Area's highest grossing nightclub that year, as well as the only nightclub from the San Francisco Bay Area to be within the top 100 highest revenue-generating clubs nationally; the club ranked 24th in the United States with estimated revenues of $10–$15 million. According to Eater, Temple's high revenues that year are credited towards a 2014 renovation and the addition of various club and non-club related amenities such as a café, co-working spaces, improved lighting, and sound system improvements.

== San Francisco location closure ==
Temple abruptly announced in April 2024 that it would close its doors on May 25 of that year, citing financial difficulties. In a WARN notice sent out, Temple stated that its recent attempts to return to profitability in light of recent industry events and changes had failed. Temple stated that it would be laying off 86 employees, including bartenders, security, servers and maintenance staff.

Reports from the magazine EDM Identity though stated that Temple would not be permanently closing, contrary to public statements, and that Hemming would be reopening the club as Future Factory, in line with a new project that Hemming and his company Zen Compound have been developing in Los Angeles, with Temple Denver also due to rebrand as Future Factory. EDM Identity reporter John Cameron expressed concern over whether Temple's original San Francisco location would be able to rebrand successfully due to the financial issues reported on in the April WARN notice.

A paper trail left by Temple, though, did encourage San Francisco Standard journalist Garret Leahy to suggest that the financial issues explanation provided by Temple did not tell the full story. Leahy cites the February 2024 lawsuit against Temple's guards as well as the January 2023 collapse of the roof into the kitchen, and that the work to inspect and fix the roof was never finished, on top of separate concerns that the roof was not accessible to disabled patrons. Temple was ordered by the City of San Francisco to install an elevator and obtain all necessary permits, though the work was never completed. Furthermore, a 4 foot by 4 foot hole was found in Temple's main floor light booth, and a mice infestation was later brought to public attention. Leahy also mentioned that though very limited online records exist, that Temple has become subject to Occupational Safety and Health Administration complaints.

Despite the reports of closure, though, Temple hosted events after the May 2024 closure date passed. In January 2025, Temple hosted a night where one of the DJs was a war robot developed by Foundation Robotics as part of a party hosted by the tech startup Vently, which also featured Twitch founder Justin Kan and the sister of Mark Zuckerberg playing sets.

== Denver location ==
In 2017, Temple opened up its Denver location, its first outside of San Francisco. The location gained local recognition in 2022 for hiring its first female and youngest manager. Hemming has stated he aspires to open a Temple nightclub in various cities around the world beyond San Francisco and that he chose Denver first due to his friends' ties with the local market as well as Denver being "fertile soil" for his visions.

== Notable performers ==
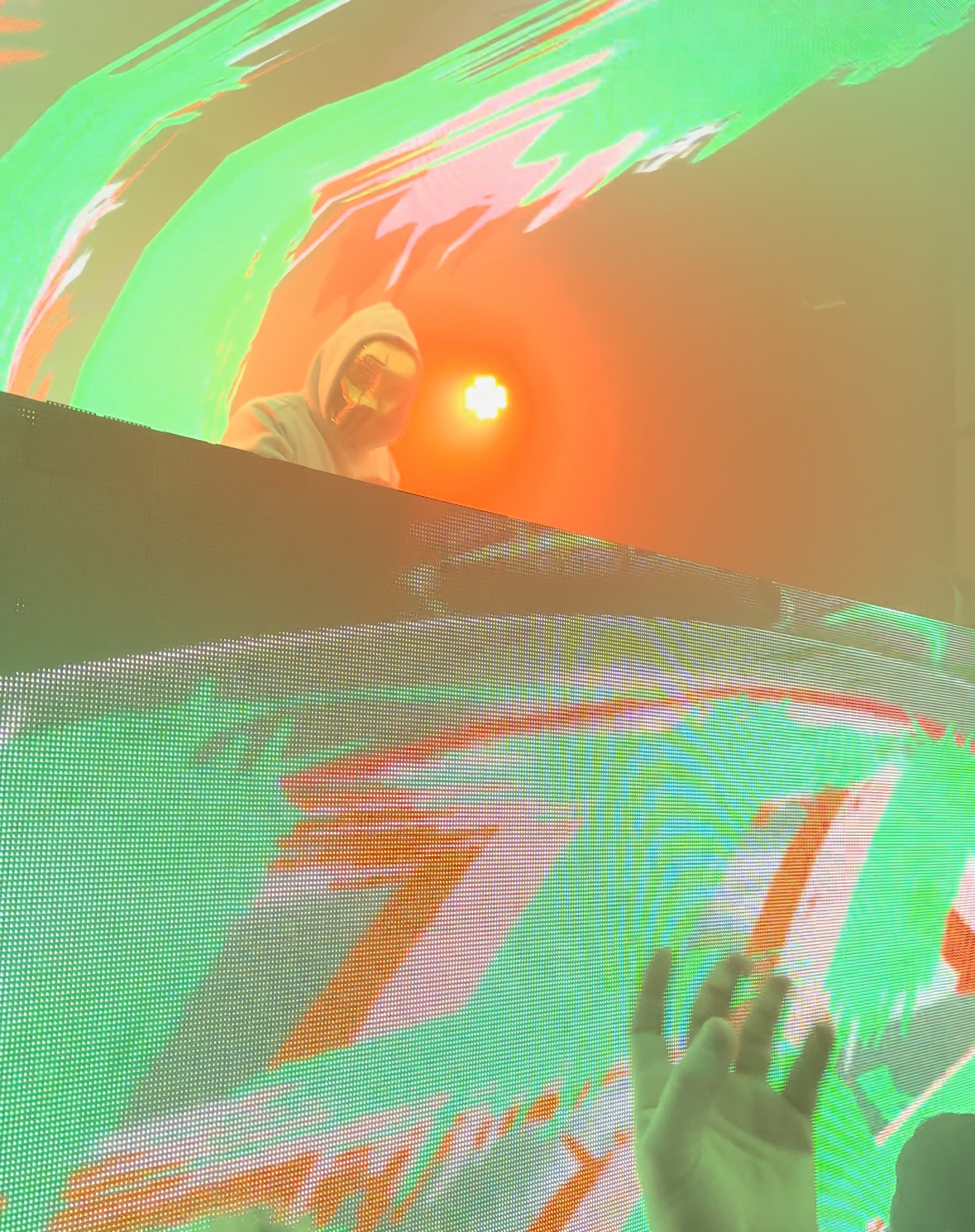
Sickick performing in Temple's main room

- 3lau
- Alesso
- Afrojack
- Bassjackers
- Blasterjaxx
- Brooke Evers
- Eva Shaw
- Firebeatz
- Flux Pavilion
- Heather Bright
- Lil Jon
- Marshmello
- Showtek
