= How Weird Street Faire =

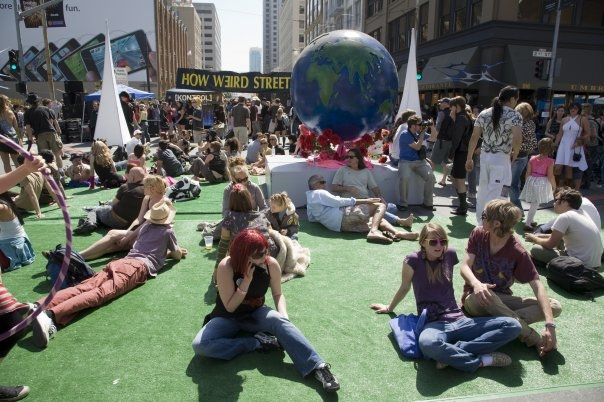
- The How Weird Street Faire's center intersection, at Howard and 2nd Streets in San Francisco.
- Genre: electronic music, live electronica, downtempo, breaks, electro, trance, house, techno, dubstep, drum & bass, dub, and world beat
- Locations: San Francisco, California
- Years active: 2000-2024 (25 Years)
- Founders: World Peace Through Technology Organization
- Website: Official website

The How Weird Street Faire was an outdoor street fair held each year in San Francisco, occupying several blocks of Howard Street and the surrounding area, in the SoMa neighborhood. The event was held yearly since 2000, centered at the intersection of Howard and Second Streets. Its last iteration was held in 2024, after which they announced that the event would no longer continue, citing rising costs. The How Weird Street Faire claims to be the longest-running electronic music street festival in North America, showcasing diverse forms of dance music including live electronica, downtempo, breaks, electro, trance, house, techno, dubstep, drum & bass, dub, and world beat. As of 2017, it had several thousand visitors, many of whom come dressed in costumes.

== History ==
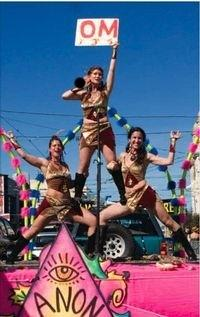
The Shamanic Cheerleaders perform at the How Weird Street Faire.

The event is a project of (and fundraiser for) the non-profit World Peace Through Technology Organization, which describes it as "an experiment in creating peace" that brings a diverse audience together to find similarities and common ground, to accept and appreciate differences, and to celebrate creativity and peace. There are many stages of music, performances, and vendors from around the world at the event. The event also features live and exhibited artwork, including an area called "Art Alley". Occurring in late Spring, the How Weird Street Faire is considered by many to be the start of San Francisco's street fair and outdoor event season. The name "How Weird Street Faire" alludes to the venue, Howard Street, as well as the street's namesake William Davis Merry Howard (1819-1856).

The festival has included workshops, fashion shows, and even a "peace game". Several charities set up booths with information about topics such as peace and sustainability. Some of the speakers who have talked about technology and peace include R. U. Sirius, Joe Firmage, Craig Newmark, and San Francisco City Supervisors Mark Leno and Chris Daly.

In 2003, a CD was released titled "How Weird Street Faire CD Vol. 1" featuring ten songs from artists who had played at the event. The album features songs from Irina Mikhailova, Adam Ohana, Shakatura, Quasar, Penta, Ocelot, Biodegradable, Kode IV, Waterjuice, and Bassnectar. The album was released by Ceiba Records. The mission of the album and the music was to inspire peace.

The How Weird Street Faire attracts thousands of people in colorful costumes, featuring a different theme each year. The 10th annual event was held on May 10, 2009, with the theme of "Rebooting the Motherboard". The 11th annual event was held on May 9, 2010, with the theme of "Bollyweird: The Cosmic Dance". The 12th annual event took place on May 1, 2011, with the theme of "Mythical Realms". The 13th annual How Weird Street Faire took place on May 13, 2012, with the theme of "2012: The 13 moons we’ve been waiting for". The 14th annual event was held on April 28, 2013, with the theme of "Weirdi Gras: A Carnival of Peace". The 15th faire was held on May 4, 2014, with the theme of "How Weird in Outer Space. Peace - the final frontier". The 16th event took place on April 26, 2015, with the theme of "The Weirdest Show on Earth". The 17th event took place on May 1, 2016 with a theme of "Cosmic Stew". The 18th annual event took place on May 7, 2017 with a theme of "Summer of Weird". The 19th annual event took place on May 6, 2018 with a theme of “The Disco Ball Inferno”.

The faire has participated in National Dance Week from 2013-2015, and was declared the national flash mob with the most participants in 2014. The How Weird Street Faire won the SF Weekly’s 2018 Best of SF award for “street fair that continues to improve and blow our minds”. The event was named one of the 10 Best Cultural Festivals in America by USA Today in 2019.

2020 saw the first How Weird World Faire, a virtual fair.

== See also ==
- List of electronic music festivals
