= Madwave =

Stéphane Imbach (born March 20th of 1979 in Lausanne), performing as Madwave, is a Swiss trance DJ and producer.

== Career ==
Stéphane Imbach's interest in music began in the early 1990s, when he came into contact with trance and rave. In 1996 he started his DJ career as Madwave and he quickly became resident DJ in the renowned Swiss clubs such as MAD (Lausanne), MOA (Geneva) and Globulle (Bulle) as well as in the Zurich clubs OXA and Sensor.

In 2001, he mixed for the first time the official "Street Parade Live"-compilation, which sold over 14.000 copies. In 2006, the founded together with Dave Joy the music label Phoenix Recordings, where artists such as Dave202, Mind-X, DJ Sakin and DJ Snowman released their productions.

Madwave plays at festivals such as the Street Parade, Future Sound of Egypt 500 & 550, Amsterdam Dance Event, Lake Parade, Energy, Love Parade, or Nature One as well as at 800 other events in England, Ireland, Australia, the Czech Republic, Spain, France, Italy, Austria, New Zealand, Greece, Tahiti and the Netherlands. He is also a co-organizer of the Street Parade.

== Selected discography ==
=== Originals ===
- 1999: Vibrations (Foresight Records)
- 2007: The Anthem 2007 (as Synergy)
- 2009: A Time For Romance (Joyride Music)
- 2012: Neverending Story (Phoenix Recordings)
- 2013: Synergy Anthem 2013 (High Contrast Recordings)
- 2014: Perceptions (Tytanium Recordings)
- 2015: Ritual (Estelle) (with Plastic Angel) (Always Alive Recordings)
- 2015: Yukatan (Grotesque Music)
- 2016: Era (with Damian Wasse) (In Trance We Trust)
- 2017: Torpedo (In Trance We Trust)
- 2018: Remote Control (& Andre Visior) (Digital Society Recordings)
- 2018: Miracle (& Exouler) (FSOE Recordings)
- 2018: Temptation (FSOE Recordings)
- 2018: Azaela (vs. Toyax) (Universal Nation)
- 2018: Shinobi (Degenerate Records)
- 2018: Lost In The Desert (vs. Kiran M Sajeev) (Rielism)
- 2018: Melodia (GO Music)
- 2019: Departure (vs. Chris SX) (Phoenix Recordings)
- 2019: Interlunium (Phoenix Recordings)

=== Remixes ===
- 2001: Murphy Brown works with Mike Nero – Loose My Mind (Part I) (MB Records)
- 2007: Michael Tsukerman – Are You Mad ? (Phoenix Recordings)
- 2010: Jaybee – Say You Will (Klubbhouse)
- 2011: DJ Snowman – Falling Lights (Phoenix Recordings)
- 2012: Solid Sunrise – The Paradigm (Phoenix Recordings)
- 2013: Butterfly – HardLove (Motion Anthem 2013) (Future Soundz)
- 2014: Shaolin Master – Imagination (Future Soundz)
- 2015: Ferry Tayle – Metamorphosis (Always Alive Recordings)
- 2015: Andrea Ribeca Feat. Lokka Vox – Cyberfly (Milk Records)
- 2016: Dave Joy – Second Chase (Phoenix Recordings)
- 2016: Mind-X – Love – Freedom – Tolerance 2K16 (Phoenix Recordings)
- 2017: Basic Dawn – Pure Thrust (Phoenix Recordings)
- 2018: DJ Sakin & Friends – Dragonfly (Reborn) (Phoenix Recordings)
- 2019: Tastexperience – Time (Black Hole Recordings)

=== Mixed compilations ===
- 2000: Magic Kingdom Vol. 2 (mit Dave202)
- 2001: Street Parade 2001 – Official Live (Trance)
- 2001: Trance.Com – Dimension One
- 2003: Shiva 2003
- 2007: Synergy (mit Dave Joy)
- 2012: Street Parade 2012 – Official Trance (mit Dave Joy)
- 2015: Street Parade 2015 – Official Trance
