= Technoparade =

Parade of vehicles playing electronic dance music

- A DJ mixing music and multiple dancers at the Paris Techno Parade. The equipment is onboard the float, which has a large speaker setup for the moving crowd.

General Information
- Related genres: Trance music, electronic dance music, goa, dub techno, psychedelic trance, happy hardcore, etc.
- Location: Germany (origin); Worldwide
- Related events: Music festival, carnival parade, rave, doof, algorave, trance festivals, electronic dance music festivals, teknivals
- Related topics: Live electronic music

A technoparade (taken from the German word "Technoparade") is a parade of vehicles equipped with strong loudspeakers and amplifiers playing electronic dance music. It resembles a carnival parade in some respects, but the vehicles (called lovemobiles) are usually less elaborately decorated. Unlike some carnival parades, a technoparade does not share the tradition of bombarding the spectators with sweets. However, the revellers do occasionally throw confetti (usually larger and more sparkly than that in a carnival parade) and spray foam from the vehicles onto the crowd.

Nearly all of the vehicles are converted trucks. In order to power the amplifiers, the trucks are frequently equipped with an additional electrical generator. For safety reasons, horse-drawn floats are never used in technoparades: there would be a danger of horses panicking from the noise and chaos. However, there are occasional human-drawn floats equipped with generators, record players, amplifiers and loudspeakers. Some of the vehicles allow people to ride along, for a fee. For those on the sidelines, or travelling alongside on foot or bicycles, attendance is free.

== Official program ==
The official program of a technoparade is generally not as important as what happens informally. In contrast to a carnival parade, the vehicles are little more than flatbed trucks with sound equipment, rather than elaborately decorated floats. There are usually no fireworks or other traditional elements of large celebrations. Technoparades are rarely linked to anniversaries of historical events: they usually simply take place in the summer to take advantage of the good weather.

However, in Germany technoparades are usually officially registered as a political demonstration and thus have an appropriate motto. That way techno fans have a constitutional right to dance in the streets, and any objections from the authorities to noise and traffic obstructions are overruled and the cities also have to pay for security and cleaning up the streets afterwards.

== Character ==
DJs deliver a constant stream of music from the parade trucks.

Technoparades generally have a carnival atmosphere, where social rules (and some laws, or at least their enforcement) are at least loosened, and sometimes broken outright. An atmosphere of chaos and tolerance prevails as bystanders dance to the shifting sounds of successive vehicles rolling by them: the music blasting from one vehicle blends into that from another, which can mean a sudden change of dance style in the area where the spheres of influence overlap. The music coming from two sound trucks overlaps with approximately equal intensity, and people can dance to either of two competing rhythms. In the technoparade subculture they call this the Verwirrungsgebiet ("overlap zone") by analogy to a concept in radio frequency engineering.

The street allows for a type of dancing that would be literally impossible in cramped German nightclubs, and the breadth of some people's dancing is further exaggerated as they throw their clothes outwards. Some in the crowd generally climb up to any high point that can possibly be scaled, more and more as the event continues. The spirit is usually continued at after-parties in the local nightclubs, sometimes including unofficial after-parties at venues having no official connection to the parade.

== Major events ==
=== World's largest ===
Count of participants for the Love Parade (blue) and Street Parade (red)

- Street Parade, Zürich around 1,000,000 participants annually as of 2018
- Love Parade, previously the world's largest with 1.5 million in 1999

=== Germany ===
5 big technoparades of the 1990s and early 2000s:

- Love Parade, Berlin / Ruhr area (1989–2010)
- Union Move, Munich (1995–2001)
- Generation Move, Hamburg / Kiel (1995–2007)
- Reincarnation, Hanover (1995–2006)
- Vision Parade, Bremen (2002–2006)

Parades with a political character:

- Fuckparade, Berlin (since 1997)
- Krachparade, Munich (since 2014)
- Zug der Liebe, Berlin (since 2015)
- Rave The Planet Parade, Berlin (since 2022)
- Nachttanzdemos (many cities)

Small town or onetime moves:

- Night Move, Cologne (1994)
- Future Parade, Brockhagen (1997–2003)
- Beatparade, Empfingen (since 1998)
- Numerous others

=== Austria ===
- Freeparty, Vienna (1994–1999)
- Unite Parade, Salzburg (1999–2008)
- Loveparade, Vienna (2000–2006)
- Freeparade, Vienna (2001–2010)
- Snow Move, Sölden

=== Switzerland ===
- Street Parade, Zürich (since 1992)
- Jungle Street Groove/Beat on the Street, Basel (since 1995)
- Antiparade, Zürich (since 1996)
- Lake Parade, Geneva (1997–2015; 2017; 2023–)
- Tanz Dich Frei (Dance yourself free), Bern (2011–2013)

=== Other ===
- FFWD Heineken Dance Parade, Rotterdam (Netherlands) (1997–2007)
- Techno Parade, Paris (France) (since 1998)
- Love Parade, Santiago (Chile) / Tel Aviv (Israel) / Mexico City (Mexico) (2000–2006)
- Budapest Parade, Budapest (Hungary) (2000–2006)
- Elektro Parade, Porto (Portugal) (2001–2003)
- Cityparade, Ghent/Liège/Brussels/Mons/Charleroi (Belgium) (2001–2006)
- Freedom Parade, Tartu (Estonia) (2002–2009)
- LovEvolution, San Francisco/Oakland (United States) (2004–2011)
- Freedom Parade, Łódź (Poland) (1997–2002; 2022–)

== Gallery ==
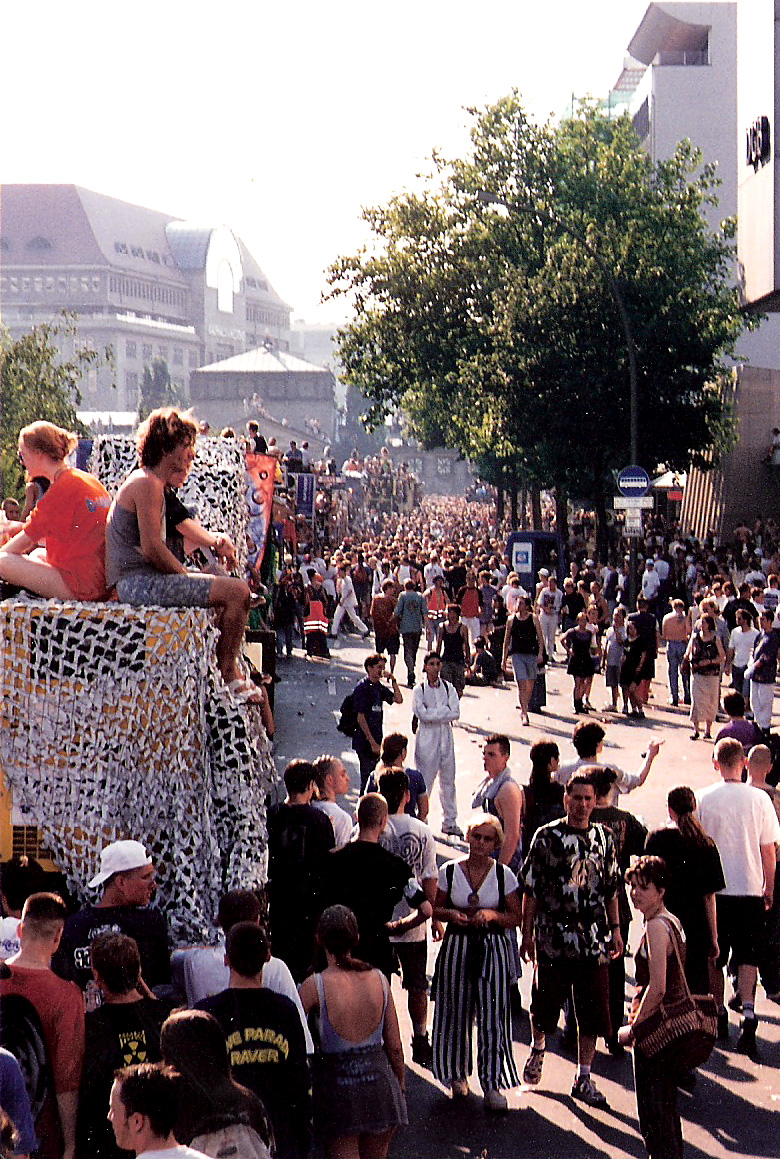
Franconia-Love-Truck 1995

Paraders dancing in front of the massive speakers carried by the parade trucks at the 2006 Paris Techno Parade.

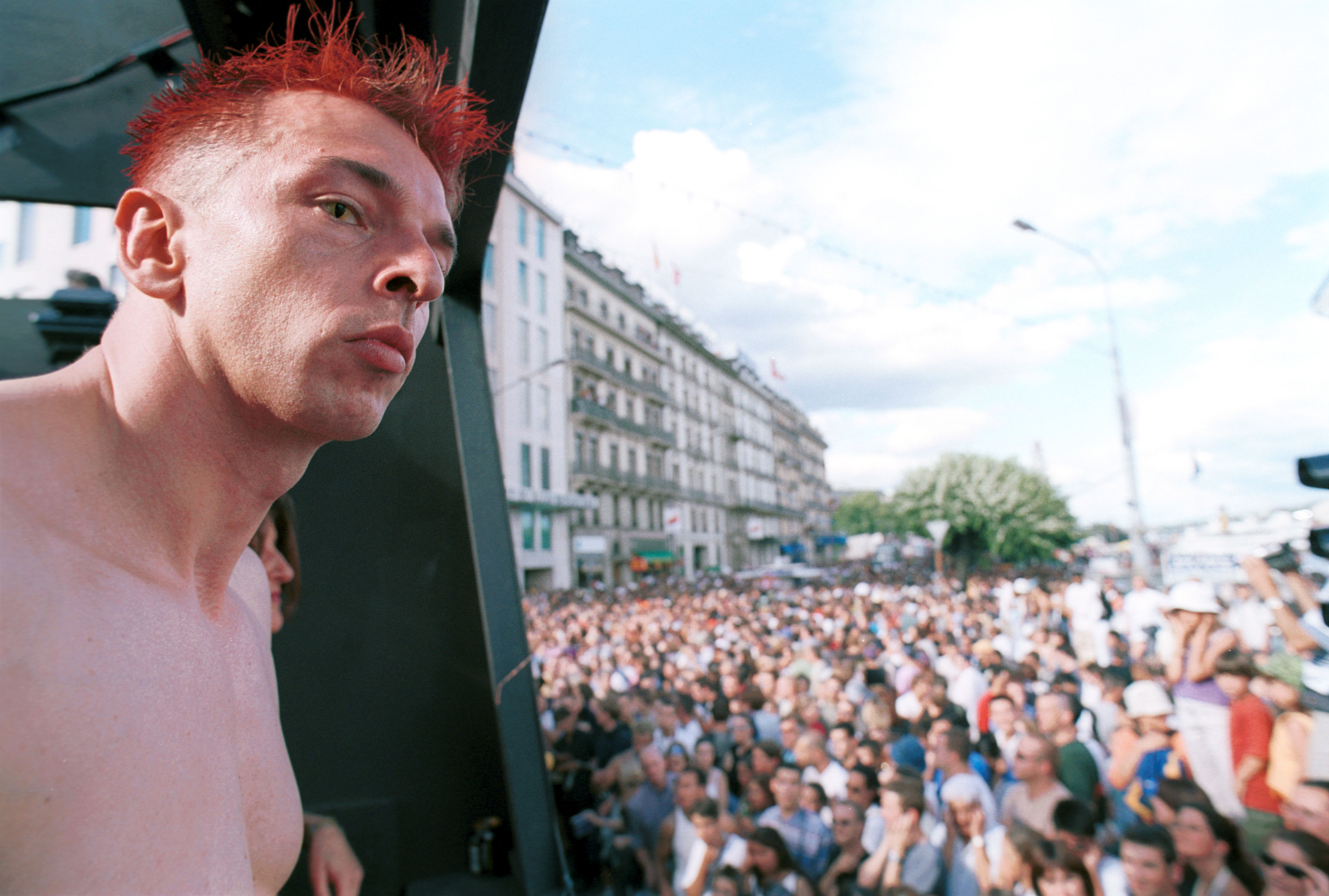
Lake-Parade-2001

The July Column during the 2006 Techno Parade in Paris, France

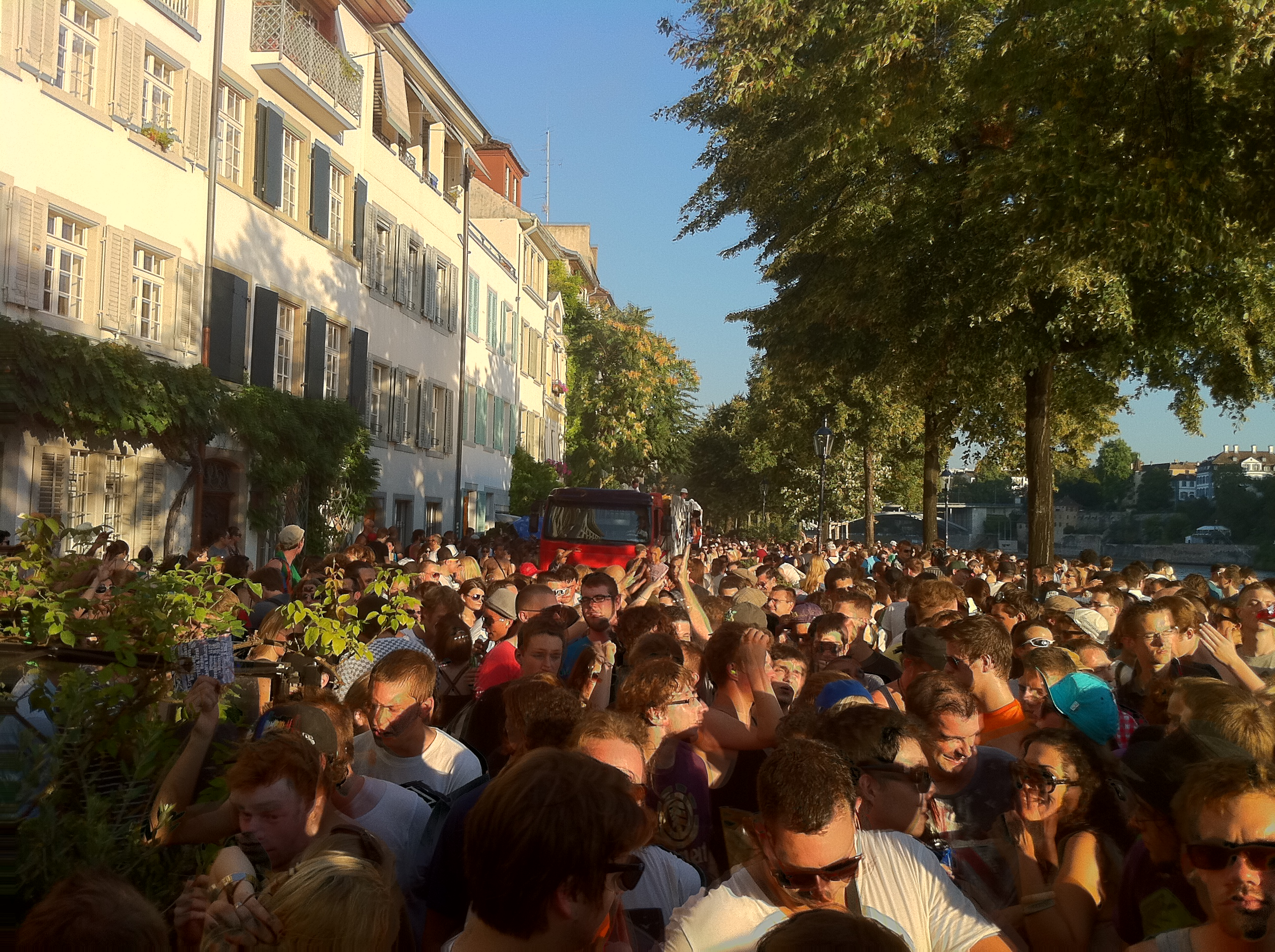
Beat on the Street Basel

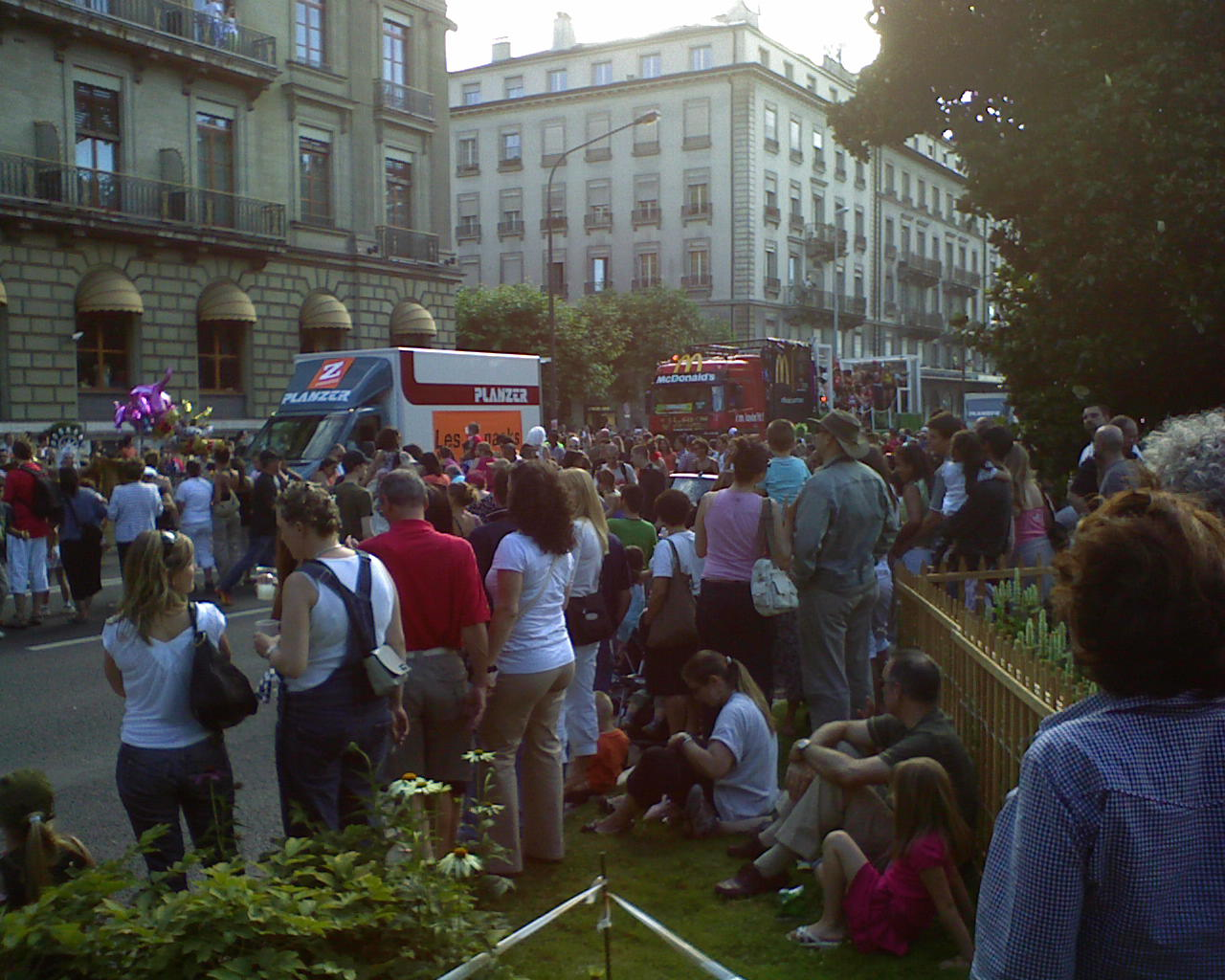
Lake Parade 2007

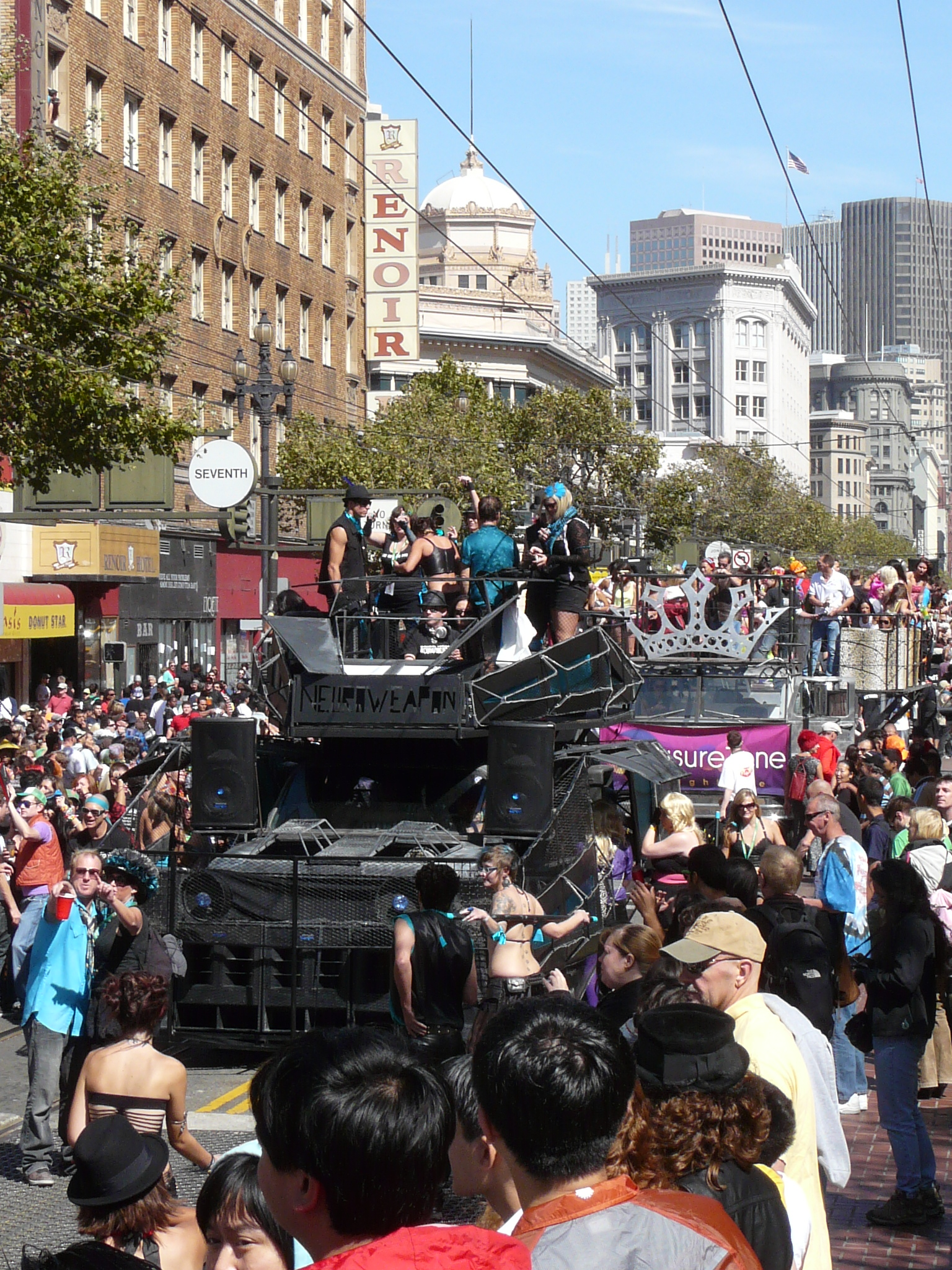
LovEvolution 2009

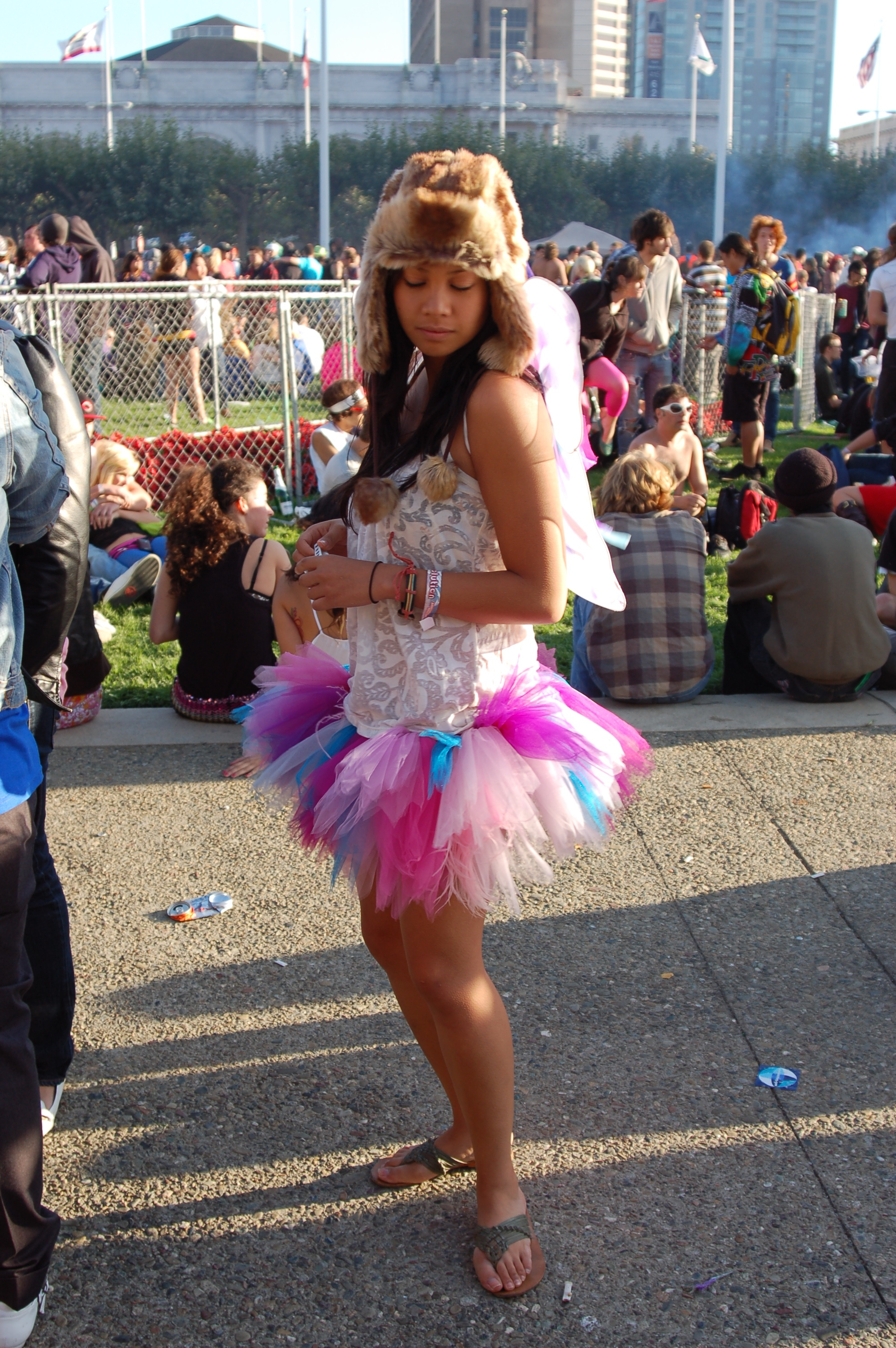
LovEvolution 2009

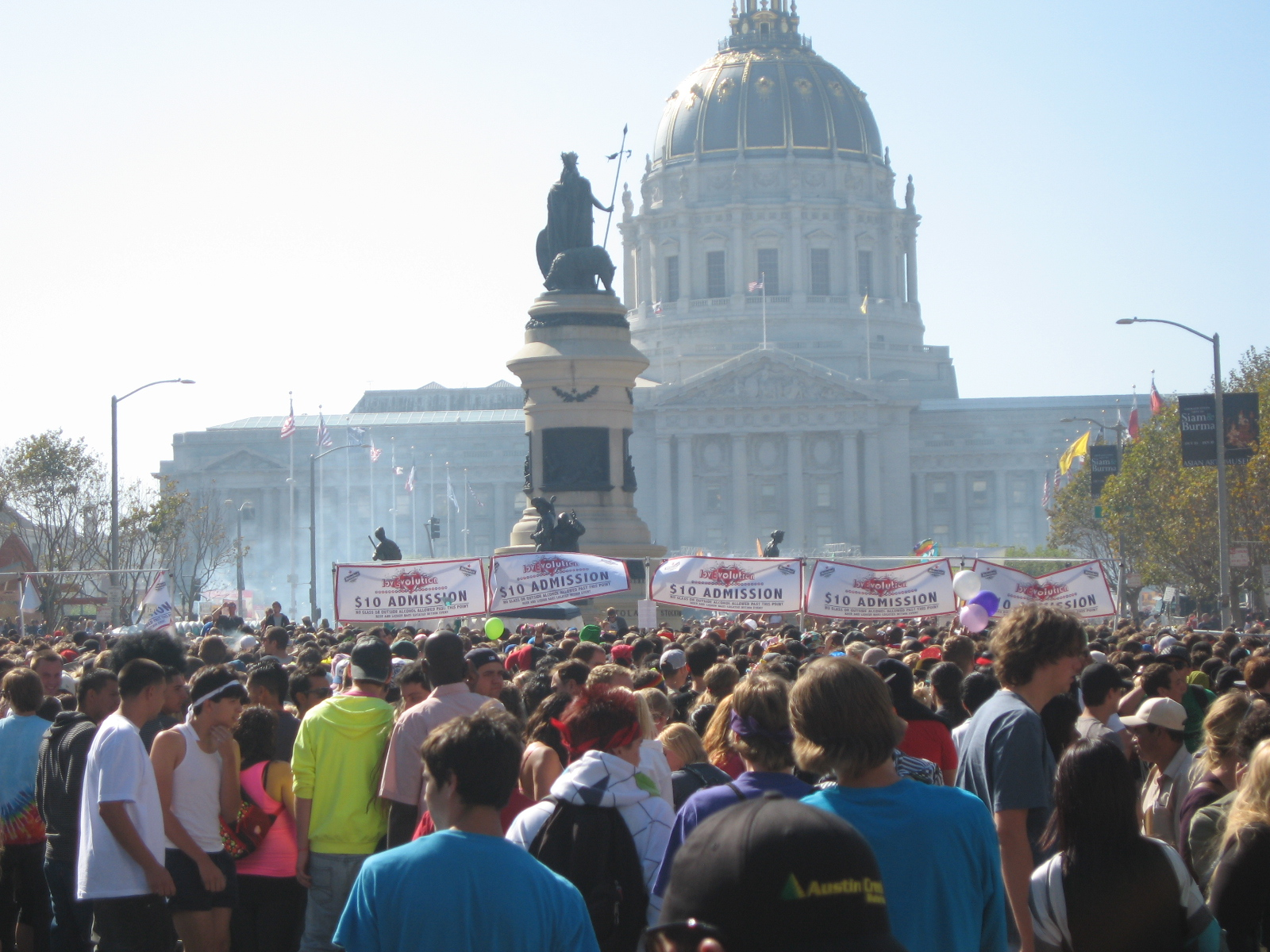
LovEvolution 2009

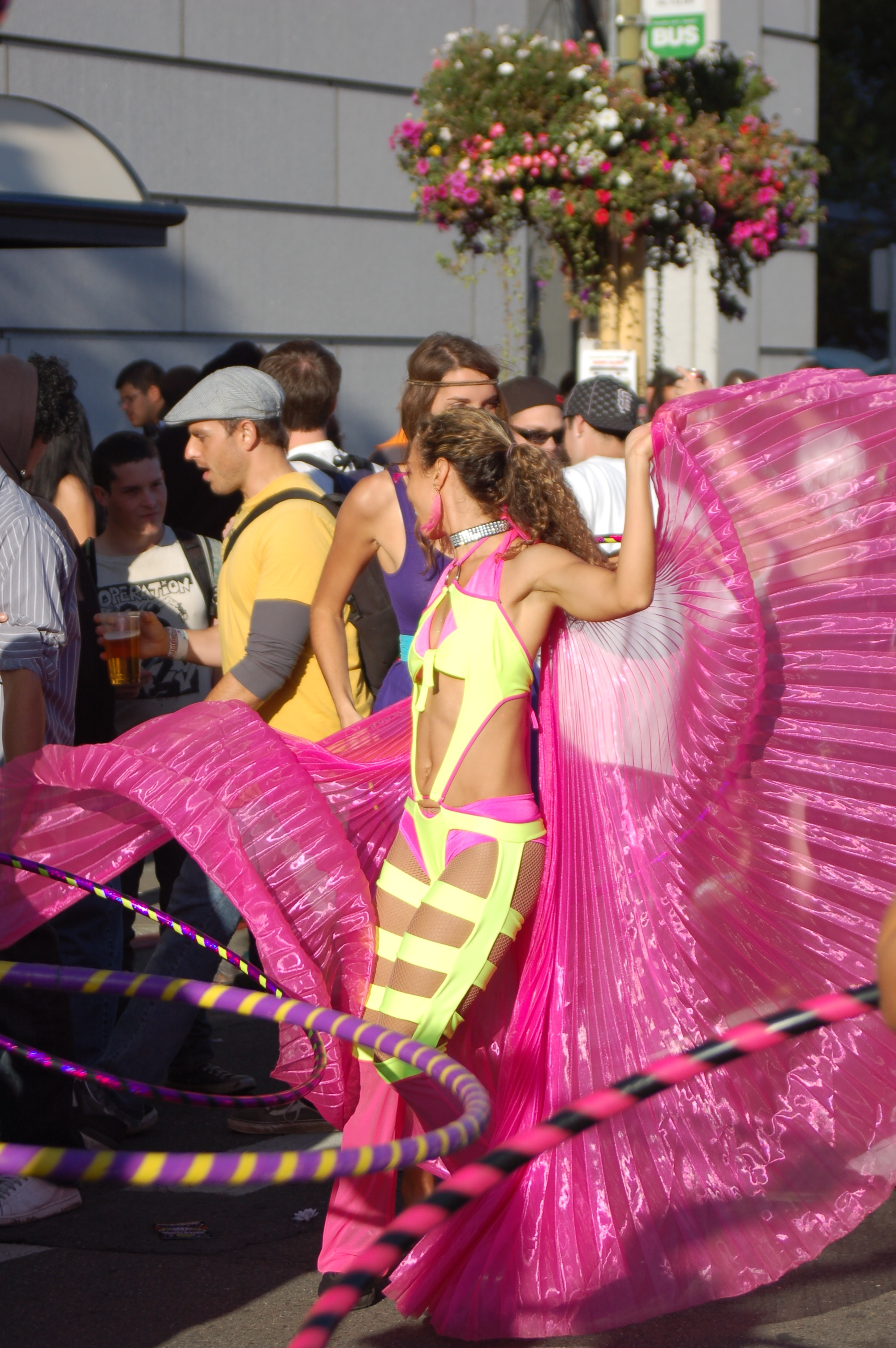
LovEvolution 2009

== Similar Events ==
Similar to technoparades, electronic dance events have also been organized using other moving vehicles such as boats and trams. In contrast to technoparades which are characterized by free participation on the street, in this case only the passengers on the vessels or inside the trams are part of the event. An example for a boatparade is the Berlin Beats & Boats event which takes place annually since 2009 and involves up to 14 swimming dancefloors. A regular Housetram event has been organized by Monika Kruse in Munich since 1995.

== See also ==
- List of electronic music festivals
- Teknival
- Doof
- Rave
