= Love Parade =

Electronic dance music festival and parade

Love Parade Loveparade

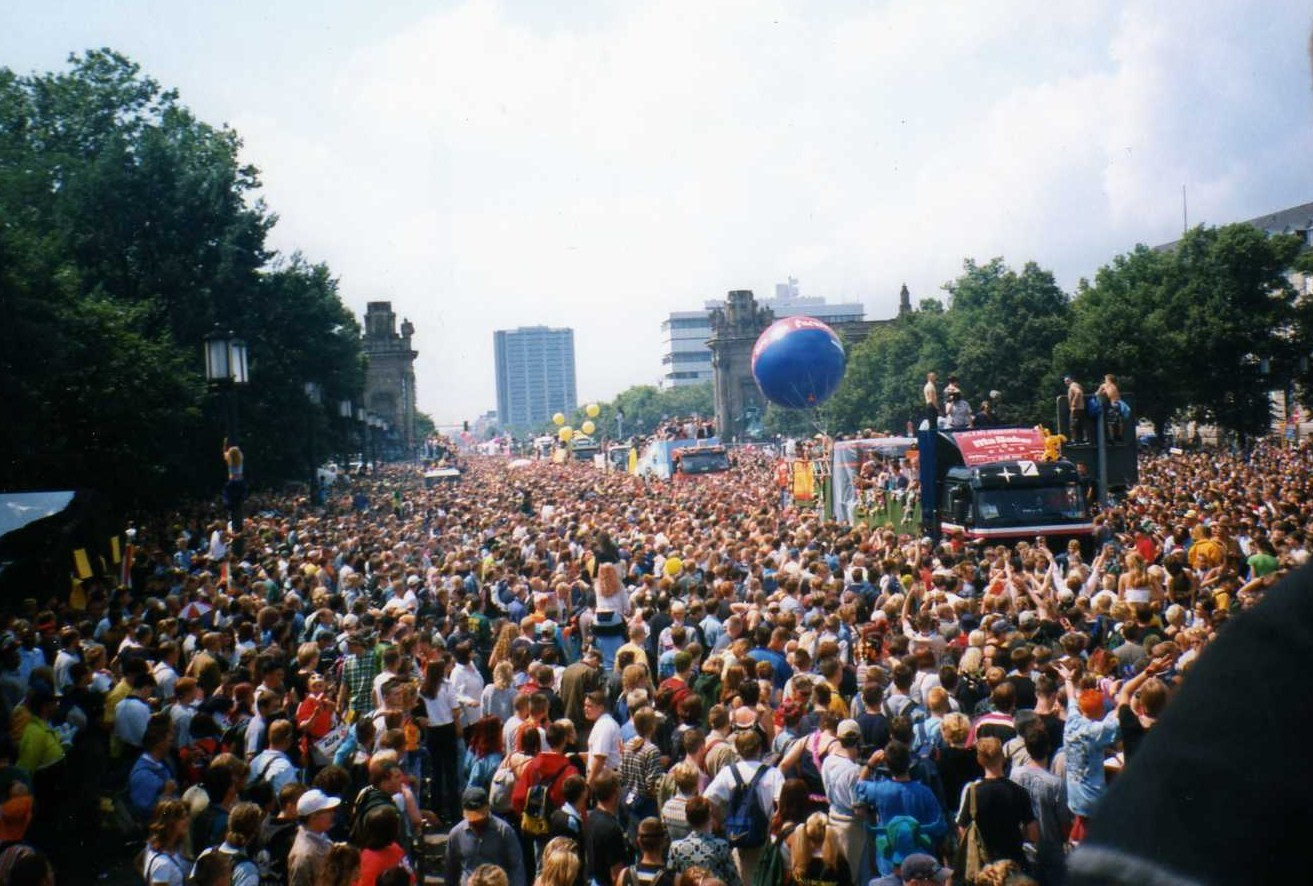
- Loveparade 1998 in Berlin
- Genre: Electronic dance music festival and technoparade
- Location: Various locations in Germany
- Years active: 1989–2003; 2006–2008; 2010
- Founded: July 1989; 37 years ago West Berlin, Germany
- Most recent: 24 July 2010

The Love Parade (German: Loveparade) was an electronic dance music festival and technoparade that originated in 1989 in West Berlin, Germany. It was held annually in Berlin from 1989 to 2003 and in 2006, then from 2007 to 2010 in the Ruhr region. Events scheduled for 2004 and 2005 in Berlin and for 2009 in Bochum were canceled.

On 24 July 2010, a crowd crush at the Love Parade in Duisburg caused the deaths of 21 people, with at least 500 others injured. As a consequence, the organizer of the festival announced that no further Love Parades would be held and that the festival was permanently canceled.

== History ==
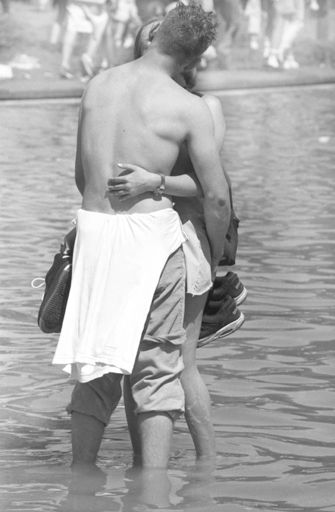
Lovers on the Love Parade, 1999

The parade first occurred in July 1989, when 150 people took to the streets in Berlin. It was started by the Berlin underground at the initiative of Matthias Roeingh (also known as "Dr. Motte") and Danielle de Picciotto, who were partners at the time. It was conceived as a political demonstration for peace and international understanding through love and music. The idea came from the administrative employee Miriam Scheffler Over the years, the Berlin Love Parade was mainly organized by Dr. Motte, Sandra Molzahn, Ralf Regitz and William Röttger (until the takeover by Mc Fit in 2006) It was at the beginning supposed to be a bigger birthday party for Roeingh, and the motto Friede, Freude, Eierkuchen (in English — Peace, Joy, Pancakes) stood for disarmament (peace), music (joy) and a fair food production/distribution (pancakes). Roeingh dissociated himself from the parade in 2006 because of the commercialization of the event.

The parade was held on the Berlin Kurfürstendamm until 1996. Because of overcrowding on this street, the festival moved to the Straße des 17. Juni in the Großer Tiergarten park in the center of Berlin. The festival became centered around the Siegessäule in the middle of the park; and the golden angel atop the column became the parade's emblem.

Many people from Germany and abroad traveled to Berlin to take part in the Parade — over a million attended in the years 1997 through 2000 and 800,000 in 2001. Attendance at the 2001 festival was significantly lower because the date of the parade was changed with little advance notice. 2002 and 2003 also saw lower figures, and in 2004 and 2005 the parade was canceled because of funding difficulties. The parade had inspired opposition because of the damage to the Tiergarten by attendees, who were provided with insufficient toilet facilities. Opponents allegedly complicated matters for organisers by booking their own events in Berlin and so to exclude the parade from being able to register with city police. In 2004, however, a scaled-down version took place which served more as a mini-protest and was promoted with the title Love Weekend. Dozens of clubs promoted the weekend-long event all over the city, with various clubs staying open for three days straight without closing. In 2006, the parade made a comeback with the help of German fitness studio McFit.

The Love Parade 2007 was planned for 7 July 2007 in Berlin. However, the Berlin event was canceled in February because the Senate of Berlin did not issue the necessary permits at that time. After negotiations with several German cities, on 21 July, it was announced that the parade would move to the Ruhr Area for the next five years. The first event took place in Essen on 25 August. The parade in Essen saw 1.2 million visitors in comparison to the 500,000 who attended the 2006 parade in Berlin.

In 2008, the festival took place in Dortmund on 19 July on the Bundesstraße 1 under the motto Highway of Love. The event was planned as a "Love Weekend", with parties throughout the region. The official estimate is that 1.6 million visitors attended, making it the largest parade to date.

The 2009 event, planned for Bochum, was canceled; a year later, the deaths of 21 attendees at the Duisburg venue prompted the parade's organiser Rainer Schaller to declare an end to the festival. "The Love Parade has always been a peaceful party, but it will forever be overshadowed by the accident, so out of respect for the victims the Love Parade will never take place again," Schaller said. The parade was one of the oldest and largest festivals of electronic music, together with Zürich's Street Parade, Mayday and Nature One.

== Successor ==
A spiritual successor, the Rave The Planet Parade, was founded by Dr. Motte, the original creator of the Love Parade and is annually held in Berlin. On 9 July 2022, the first Rave The Planet Parade took place in Berlin to call for the city’s electronic music culture to be added to a World Heritage list.

== Setup ==
The music played at the events was predominantly electronic dance music — in this case mainly house & techno, and schranz music. Attempts to introduce other music styles, such as hip hop, have failed. Hardcore and gabber music were part of the parade in early years, but were later removed. They are now celebrated separately on a counter-demonstration called "Fuckparade".

The parade was seen to be louder and more crowded than most concerts. With its water-cooled sound systems on every truck, the parade produced an extremely loud sound floor. After the 2001 arrangement, veterinarians at the Berlin Zoo blamed the parade for giving more than half of its animals diarrhea. Chairman Heiner Kloes said veterinarians told him the heavy bass was to blame for disturbing the animals. The parade consisted of the sound trucks that usually featured local, or important, clubs and their DJs. It had become a rule that only trucks that had sponsors from a techno-related field, such as clubs, labels or stores, were allowed, but advertising space was increased after the 2006 event to offset the high costs of equipping a truck. The trucks were usually open on top and featured dancers, with box-systems mounted on the side or rear.

The parade was a place where some exhibited and enjoyed other people's exhibitionist tendencies. Some attendees enjoyed carrying around toys or other items such as dummies (pacifiers) or face masks. Often the crowd was imaginative in terms of clothing (or lack thereof) and appearance.

One famous picture from the parade is people sitting and dancing on streetlamps, trees, commercial signs, telephone booths, which gave the event's nickname "the greatest amateur circus on earth".

The demonstration concluded with the so-called "Abschlusskundgebung" which were sets of the world's leading top DJs such as Tiësto, Paul van Dyk, Carl Cox, Armin van Buuren, DJ Rush, DJ Hell, WestBam, Drum Connection, Miss Djax, Marusha or Chris Liebing. During this time all trucks (usually about 40) were connected to each other and set online to the statue of victory where the turntables are.

== Disturbances ==
The parade was quite peaceful for an event of its size, seeing few arrests. In 2008, for example, charges were pressed for six robberies, three sexually related offences and forty thefts. Twenty-three attendees were caught with drugs and forty-nine were charged with bodily harm. There were 177 parade visitors provisionally arrested by the police. Arrests were usually related to drug crimes and most other incidents featured people passing out due to dehydration or hyperthermia. In 2000, after the parade, a girl under the influence of ecstasy was run over by an S-Bahn after she had been leaning on the door too hard.

== 2010 disaster ==
At the 2010 Love Parade in Duisburg, the number of people attending allegedly reached 1.4 million – the original expectation was around 800,000 – whereas police believed around 400,000 people were present. 21 people were killed, and more than 600 injured, in an incident on an overcrowded ramp leading from a tunnel into the festival. All of the victims were crushed to death, according to officials.

Safety experts and a fire service investigator had previously warned that the site was not suitable for the numbers expected to attend. Rainer Schaller, the festival's organizer and chief executive officer, later said the festival would not continue in future.

A preliminary investigation of the ministry of the interior placed heavy blame on the organizers around Rainer Schaller. Schaller in turn claimed that errors by the police in controlling streams of visitors led to the accident.

== Love Parade International ==
Similar festivals have taken place in other cities of Germany and many other countries worldwide. Large spin-off festivals in Europe include Zürich's Street Parade, Geneva's Lake Parade, Paris's Techno Parade, Rotterdam's FFWD Dance Parade, Munich's Union Move, Hamburg's Generation Move, Hannover's Reincarnation, Bremen's Vision Parade and the Love Parade and the Freeparade in Vienna. In 1994, 1995 and 1996 an event called Love Parade was held in Melbourne, Australia. Unlike its overseas counterparts, this was a smaller "rave party" version of the festival. In 1996 it was held at Festival Hall in West Melbourne and included a parade that made the evening news. It was followed in 1997 by a Love Parade in Sydney, Australia, likewise a smaller rave party, held at the infamous Graffiti Hall of Fame in Redfern. In 1999 and 2000 technoparades named "Buenos Aires Energy Parade" took place in Buenos Aires, Argentina under the motto "Love, Peace and Dance". On Saturday 8 July 2000 a Love Parade was held in Roundhay Park, Leeds, United Kingdom sponsored by BBC Radio 1. In 2001, the official UK parade had moved to Newcastle upon Tyne which was to have seen a parade through the streets of Newcastle before ending up on Town Moor but was canceled after the police refused a license: BBC Radio 1 still hosted a more contained event, however. Since then no Love Parade has taken place in the United Kingdom. In Summer 2000 one of the first public events that took place in post-war Sarajevo, Bosnia and Herzegovina, was Futura, Festival of Electronic Music. Some of the world's most famous DJs, including the organizers of the Berlin Love Parade, performed in a bombed and burnt out factory.

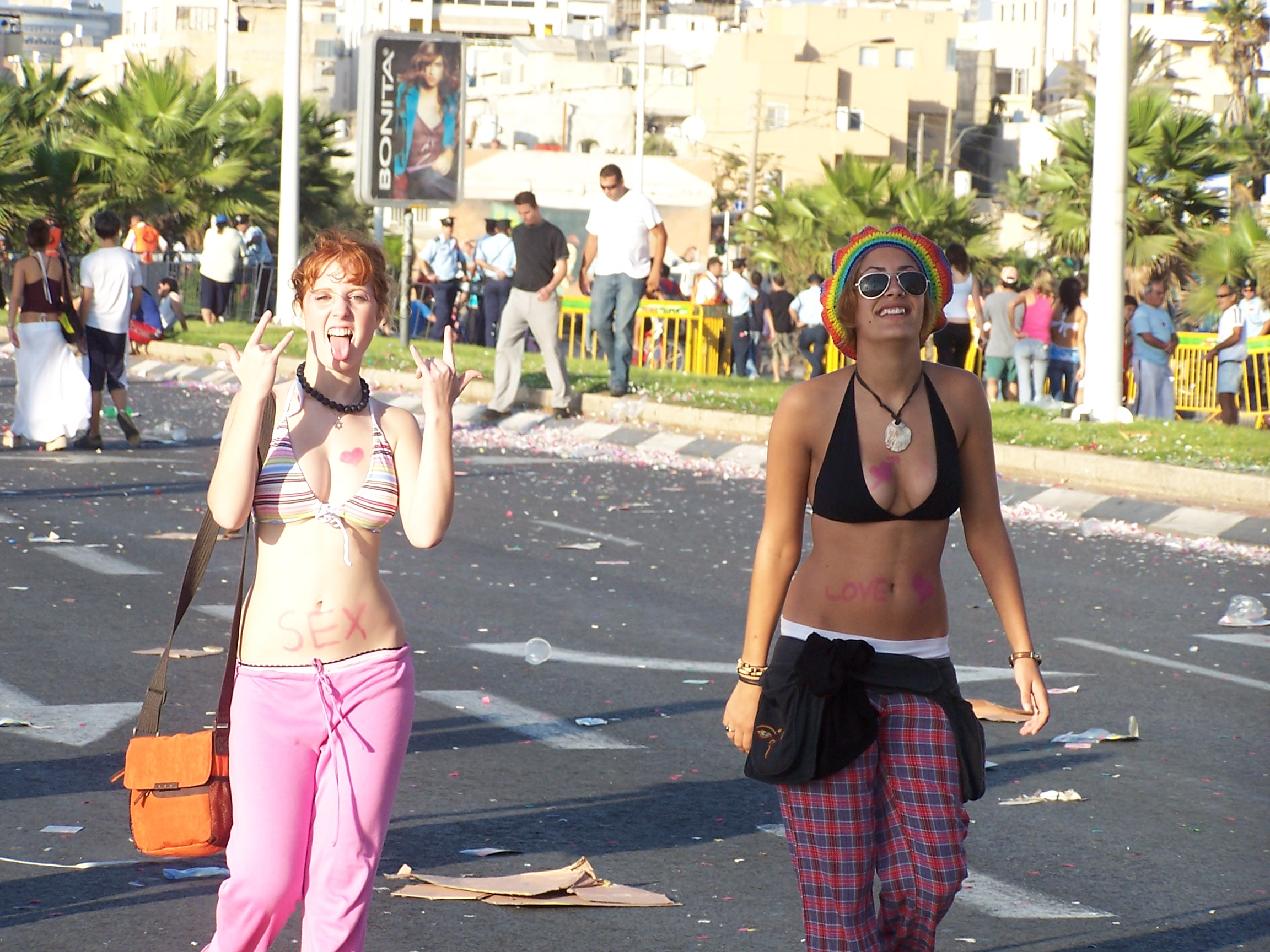
LoveParade in Tel Aviv in October 2004

After being held in the North-American Continent for the first time in Mexico (2002), in the fall of 2004 the Love Parade was held in San Francisco. They had held their inaugural Parade in September 2004 with 37,000 attending. The parade was held again in San Francisco in September 2005 as a rousing success drawing over 50–60,000 people. In 2006, the parade was held on 23 September and was renamed Love Fest because the Loveparade Berlin organization did not renew any of their worldwide licenses not already under contract so they could focus on their own event. 2009 was the biggest success of the parade now renamed LovEvolution with over 100,000 people. The first Love Parade in Santiago was held in 2005 and gathered over 100,000 people; the 2006 version gathered over 200,000 people. The first Love Parade in Caracas was held in June 2007 and gathered over 25,000 people.

Spin-off festivals of the Love Parade have taken place in:

- Berlin, Hamburg, Munich, Frankfurt, Bremen and Hanover, Germany
- Zurich, Geneva, Basel and Bern, Switzerland
- Vienna and Salzburg, Austria
- Paris, France
- Rotterdam, Netherlands
- Bologna and Turin, Italy
- Porto, Portugal
- Sydney, Australia
- Buenos Aires, Argentina
- Rio de Janeiro, Brazil
- Santiago, Chile
- Leeds, England
- Budapest, Hungary
- Tel Aviv, Israel
- Mexico City and Acapulco, Mexico
- Oslo, Norway (Summer Parade)
- Cape Town, South Africa
- Caracas, Venezuela
- Little Rock and San Francisco, United States
- Sarajevo, Bosnia and Herzegovina

== Legal issues ==
Under German law the state has to pay for security during political demonstrations as well as cleaning up the streets after the demonstration. In the case of a commercial event however, the organizer must cover these expenses. For a large event like the Love Parade the costs are quite high: an estimated €300,000 to €400,000.

The Love Parade was initially held as a political demonstration to save costs; however it was organized by two companies set up just for the Love Parade. Due to this there was a dispute between the organizers and the city of Berlin every year about the status of the Love Parade and who should bear what costs. Finally in 2001, the courts ruled that the Love Parade had to be held as commercial event.

== Anthems ==
Every German parade has had its own anthem.

Year	Artist	Title
1992	3 Phase feat. Dr. Motte	Der Klang Der Familie
1997	Dr. Motte & WestBam	Sunshine
1998	Dr. Motte & WestBam	One World One Future
1999	Dr. Motte & WestBam	Music Is the Key
2000	Dr. Motte & WestBam	One World One Loveparade
2001	The Love Committee	You Can't Stop Us
2002	The Love Committee	Access Peace
2003	The Love Committee	Love Rules
2006	WestBam & the Love Committee	United States of Love
2007	WestBam & the Love Committee	Love Is Everywhere (New Location)
2008	WestBam & the Love Committee	Highway to Love
2010	Anthony Rother	The Art of Love

== List of Love Parades ==
Year	Location	Motto	Attendees
1989	Berlin	Friede, Freude, Eierkuchen (Eng.) Peace, Joy, Pancakes	150
1990	Berlin	The Future Is Ours	2,000
1991	Berlin	My House Is Your House And Your House Is Mine	6,000
1992	Berlin	The Spirit Makes You Move	15,000
1993	Berlin	The Worldwide Party People Weekend	31,000
1994	Berlin	Love 2 Love	110,000
1995	Berlin	Peace on Earth	280,000
1996	Berlin	We Are One Family	750,000
1997	Berlin	Let the Sunshine in Your Heart	1,000,000
1997	Sydney		
1998	Berlin	One World One Future	800,000
1999	Berlin	Music Is The Key	1,500,000
1999	Buenos Aires	(Buenos Aires Energy Parade) Amor, Paz y Dance parte 1 (Love, Peace and Dance part one)	450,000
2000	Berlin	One World One Loveparade	1,300,000
2000	Leeds	Radio One & Trade – One Love	500,000
2000	Buenos Aires	(Buenos Aires Energy Parade) Amor, Paz y Dance parte 2 (Love, Peace and Dance part two)	750,000
2001	Berlin	Join The Love Republic	800,000
2001	Newcastle upon Tyne (canceled)		
2002	Berlin	Access Peace	750,000
2002	Mexico City		
2003	Berlin	Love Rules	750,000
2004	San Francisco		
2005	San Francisco		
2005	Santiago	Sal a la calle y baila (eng. Get out there and dance)	100,000
2006	Berlin	The Love is Back	1,200,000
2006	San Francisco (as LoveFest)		
2006	Santiago	El Baile es de Todos	200,000
2007	Essen	Love is everywhere	1,200,000
2007	Caracas	Live the Love!	80,000
2007	San Francisco	as LoveFest	89,000
2008	Dortmund	Highway to love	1,600,000
2008	Rotterdam	Olympic Edition	500,000
2008	San Francisco	as LoveFest	120,000
2008	Caracas	Keep the Love Alive!	
2009	Bochum (canceled)		
2009	San Francisco	as LovEvolution	150,000
2010	Duisburg	The Art of Love	1,400,000

According to media reports, the attendance figures had been misstated by the organizers for years. Accurate counts are not available since entry is free and uncontrolled. The mayor of Dortmund and the police confirmed the number of attendees in Dortmund.

== See also ==
- List of technoparades
- List of electronic music festivals
- Love Parade disaster
