= Toyax =

Disc jockey

Thomas Hoeflaak (born 29 November 1981 in Haarlem), performing as Toyax, is a Dutch DJ.

== Career ==
Thomas Hoeflaak's interest in music started in 1994, when he fell in love with trance and rave. 1999, he built his own music studio Wheaton Studios. He sent his first demo to q-dance for the Qlubtempo talentroom and 2 months later he was playing there. Toyax played at Nature One(16), Electronic Family(4), Grotesque(4), Defqon.1(3) and more than 1000 parties in the Netherlands, Germany, Switzerland, France, Spain, Poland and Belgium alongside Tiesto, Paul van Dyk, Armin van Buuren, Carl Cox, Charlotte de Witte, Reinier Zonneveld and Ferry Corsten. He mostly takes inspiration from Marino Stephano, RMB, Nostrum and Oliver Lieb.

In 2008 Toyax released his first track Just Before I Left on the label Tektra Music.

== Singles ==
- 2008: Just Before I Left (vs. Jimmy Santano)
- 2017: Melody Is Everywhere
- 2018: The Epitome Of Emotions
- 2018: It's All About Love
- 2018: Dreaming Of Summer (vs. Alexey Polozok)
- 2018: Waiting For The Summer / Heaven's Tears
- 2018: Summer Memories (vs. Terry Bones)
- 2018: Azaela (vs. Madwave)
- 2020: My Love Of My Life (with MakeFlame)
- 2021: Eternal Summer (with MakeFlame)
