= Rave The Planet Parade =

Electronic dance music festival and parade

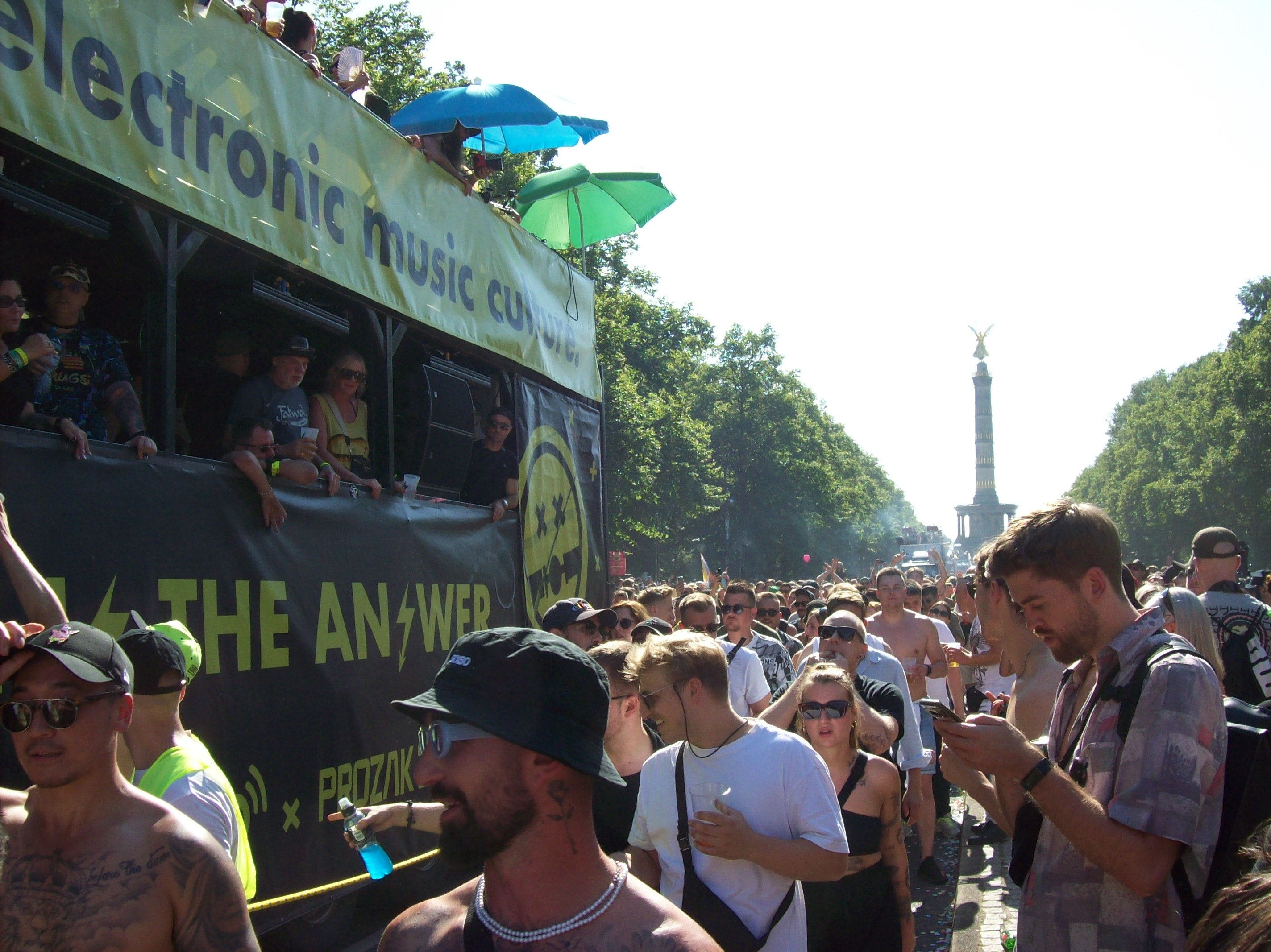
- Rave the Planet Parade in Berlin, 2023
- Genre: Electronic dance music festival and technoparade
- Dates: Annual (Summer)
- Locations: Berlin, Germany
- Years active: 2022–present
- Founded: 9 July 2022; 4 years ago Berlin, Germany
- Most recent: 15 August 2026
- Attendance: 300,000 (estimated, 2023)
- Organiser: rave the planet gGmbH

The Rave The Planet Parade is an electronic dance music festival and technoparade that originated in 2022 in Berlin, Germany. It is considered a spiritual successor to the Love Parade, which was held annually in Berlin from 1989 to 2006 and then in other German cities until 2010. The parade is organized by the non-profit company Rave the Planet gGmbH, which was founded by Dr. Motte, the original creator of the Love Parade, along with other techno enthusiasts and industry professionals.

The parade is held annually in the summer and aims to celebrate electronic music culture while advocating for its recognition and preservation. It combines elements of a music festival, political demonstration, and cultural event.

== History ==
The idea for the Rave The Planet Parade was conceived in 2019 by Dr. Motte and a group of electronic music enthusiasts. They sought to revive the spirit of the Love Parade while addressing contemporary issues and challenges faced by the electronic music community.

The inaugural Rave The Planet Parade took place on July 9, 2022, marking a significant return of large-scale techno parades to the streets of Berlin after a 12-year hiatus following the Love Parade disaster in Duisburg in 2010.

== Format and Principles ==
Rave The Planet operates as both a parade and a demonstration, combining music, art, and political activism. The event adheres to several core principles:

1. Promoting peace, joy, and pancakes (echoing the original Love Parade motto)
2. Advocating for the recognition of electronic music culture
3. Supporting sustainability and environmental awareness
4. Fostering inclusivity and diversity
5. Maintaining a non-commercial ethos

The parade features numerous floats with DJs and sound systems, representing various clubs, labels, and collectives from Berlin and beyond. Participants dance through the streets of Berlin, typically starting at Kurfürstendamm and ending at the Großer Tiergarten.

== Cultural and Political Impact ==
The Rave The Planet Parade is not just a music festival but a political demonstration advocating for the recognition and preservation of electronic music culture. The event addresses various political issues, including basic income, climate change, and queer life. The organization also demands that techno and club culture be classified as cultural goods that need protection.

== UNESCO Campaign ==
One of Rave The Planet's most significant achievements was its successful campaign for UNESCO recognition of Berlin's techno culture. The organization actively campaigned for Berlin's techno culture to be recognized as UNESCO Intangible Cultural Heritage.

On March 14, 2024, the German Commission for UNESCO announced that Berlin techno culture had been listed on the Nationwide Inventory of Intangible Cultural Heritage. This recognition solidifies techno's significant contribution to Germany's cultural identity and acknowledges its impact on the city of Berlin since the mid-to-late 1980s.

The successful UNESCO campaign marks a major milestone for the entire electronic music culture. It not only celebrates the vibrancy of Berlin's techno scene but also recognizes its global significance and enduring influence. This achievement is expected to help ensure that club culture is recognized as a valuable sector worthy of protection and support.

== Anthems ==
Similar to the Love Parade tradition, the Rave The Planet Parade features an official anthem each year:

Year	Artist	Title
2022	A*S*Y*S & Kai Tracid	Rave The Planet
2023	Dr. Motte & Jam El Mar	Music Is The Answer
2024	Dr. Motte, Westbam/ML & Tom Wax	Love Is Stronger
2025	Dr. Motte & Marc Van Linden	Our Future Is Now

== List of Rave the Planet Parades ==
Year	Location	Motto	Attendees
2022	Berlin	Together We Are One	200,000+
2023	Berlin	Music Is the Answer	300,000 (estimated)
2024	Berlin	Love Is Stronger	300,000 (estimated)
2025	Berlin	Our Future Is Now	300,000 (estimated)

== Differences from Love Parade ==
While the Rave The Planet Parade draws inspiration from the Love Parade, there are several key differences:

1. Legal Status: the Rave The Planet Parade is registered as a demonstration, addressing the legal issues that plagued the later years of Love Parade.
2. Environmental Focus: There is a stronger emphasis on sustainability and eco-friendly practices.
3. Cultural Preservation: The event has a more explicit focus on preserving and promoting electronic music culture.
4. Scale: While growing, the Rave the Planet Parade has maintained a more manageable scale compared to the peak years of Love Parade.

== Future Prospects ==
Rave The Planet aims to continue as an annual event in Berlin while expanding its cultural and political initiatives. The organization is working on year-round projects to support the electronic music community and advance its goals for cultural recognition and preservation.

== See also ==
- Love Parade
- List of technoparades
- List of electronic music festivals
