= Union Move =

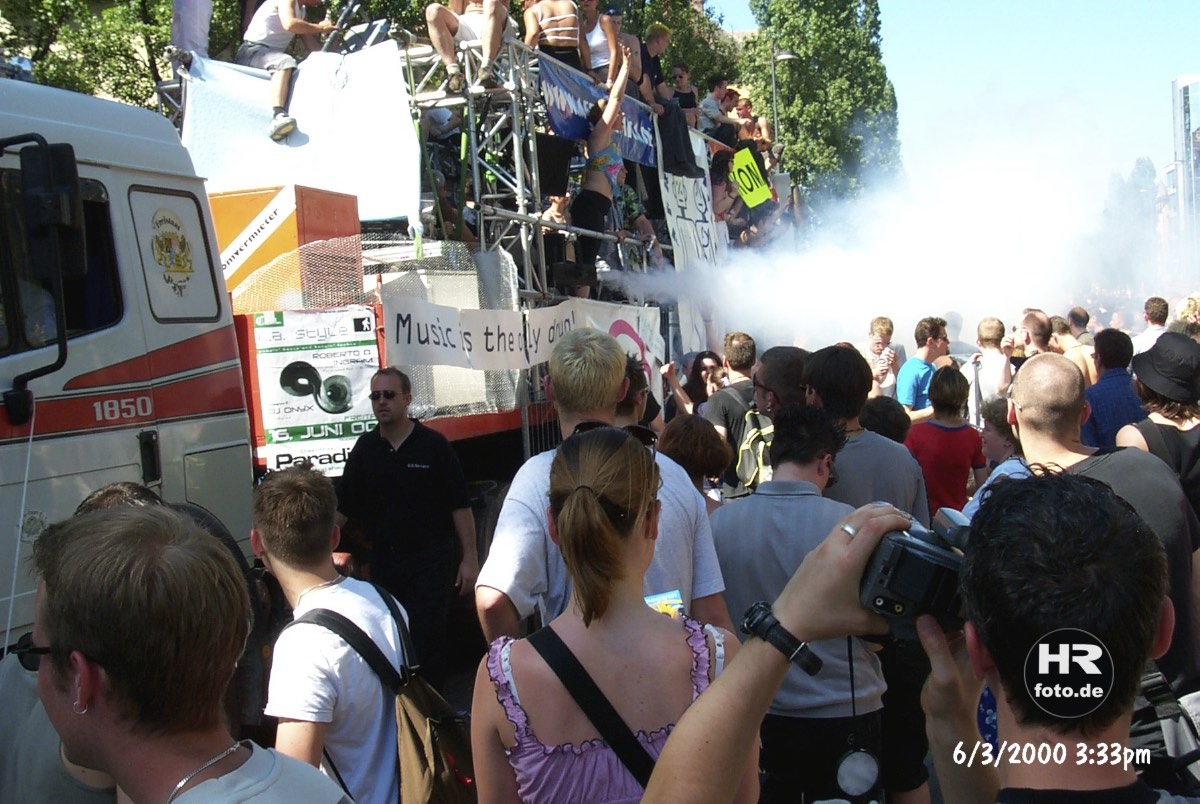
- Union Move 2000
- Genre: Electronic dance music
- Dates: late May and early June
- Locations: Munich, Germany
- Years active: 1995–2001
- Attendance: 100,000 (1996, 1997)

Union Move was a technoparade that occurred annually in Munich from 1995 to 2001. It was an initiative by Munich event organizers and nightclub owners (Kunstpark Ost, Ultraschall, Parkcafe, Pulverturm, P1, Partysan) to demonstrate against the Munich curfew and excessive police controls. A recurring motto of the parade was "Music is the only drug!". The first Union Move took place on 27 May 1995 and attracted 60,000 people. The 1996 parade for the first time attracted 100,000 people, as well as the 1997 parade which involved 16 trucks equipped with sound systems. The next three parades attracted between 60,000 and 70,000 people, but in 2001 attendance declined. The parade usually started at Münchner Freiheit square and continued over Leopoldstraße all the way to Odeonsplatz, and in the first years even further over Isartor to Marienplatz where the final took place. After the final ravers could board a Housetram and this way continue partying through the city. At night the festival was continued at multiple after-parties in the local nightclubs under the motto Night Move. In 2015 an initiative was launched to revive the parade. So far, however, these attempts have not been successful.

== Gallery ==
1998

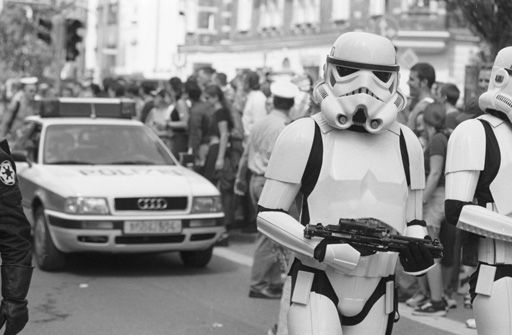

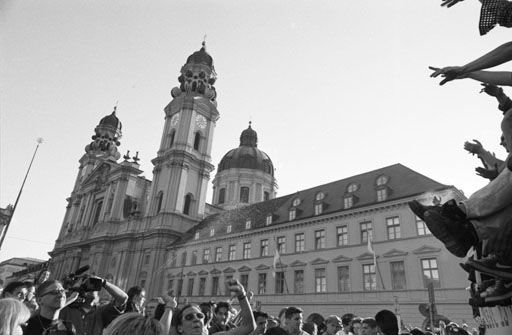

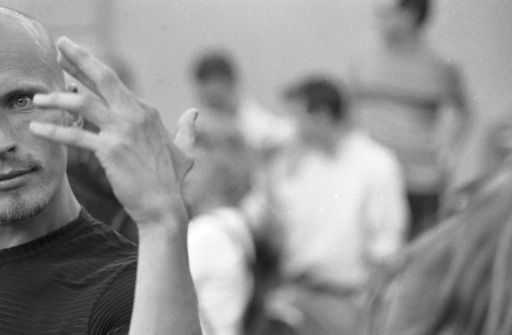

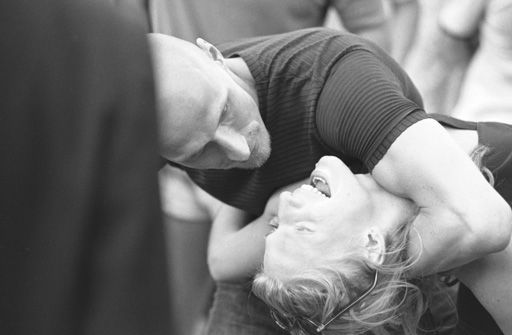

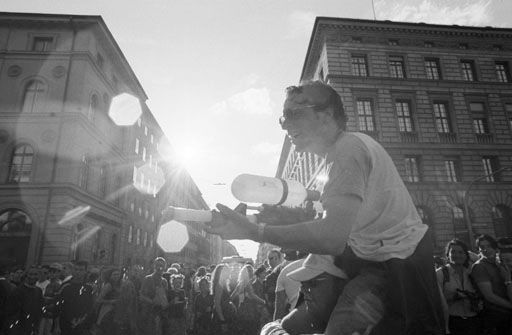
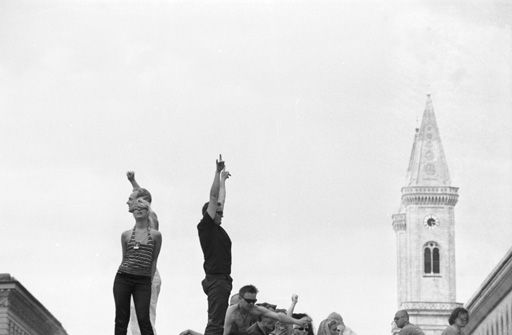

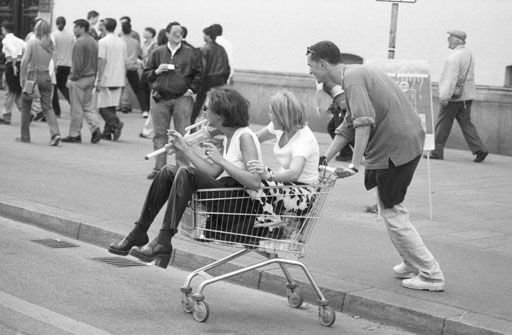

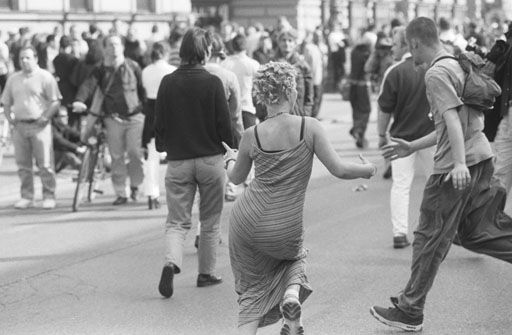

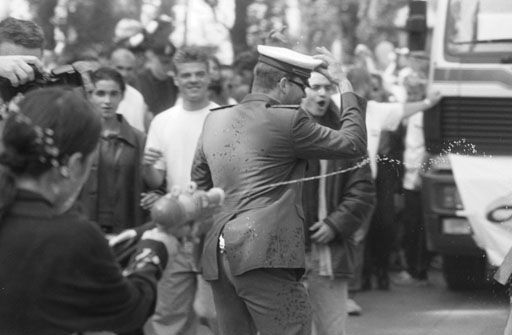

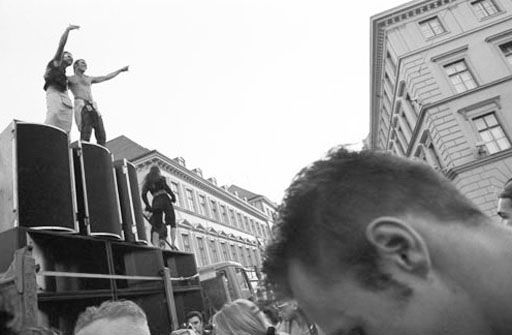

2000

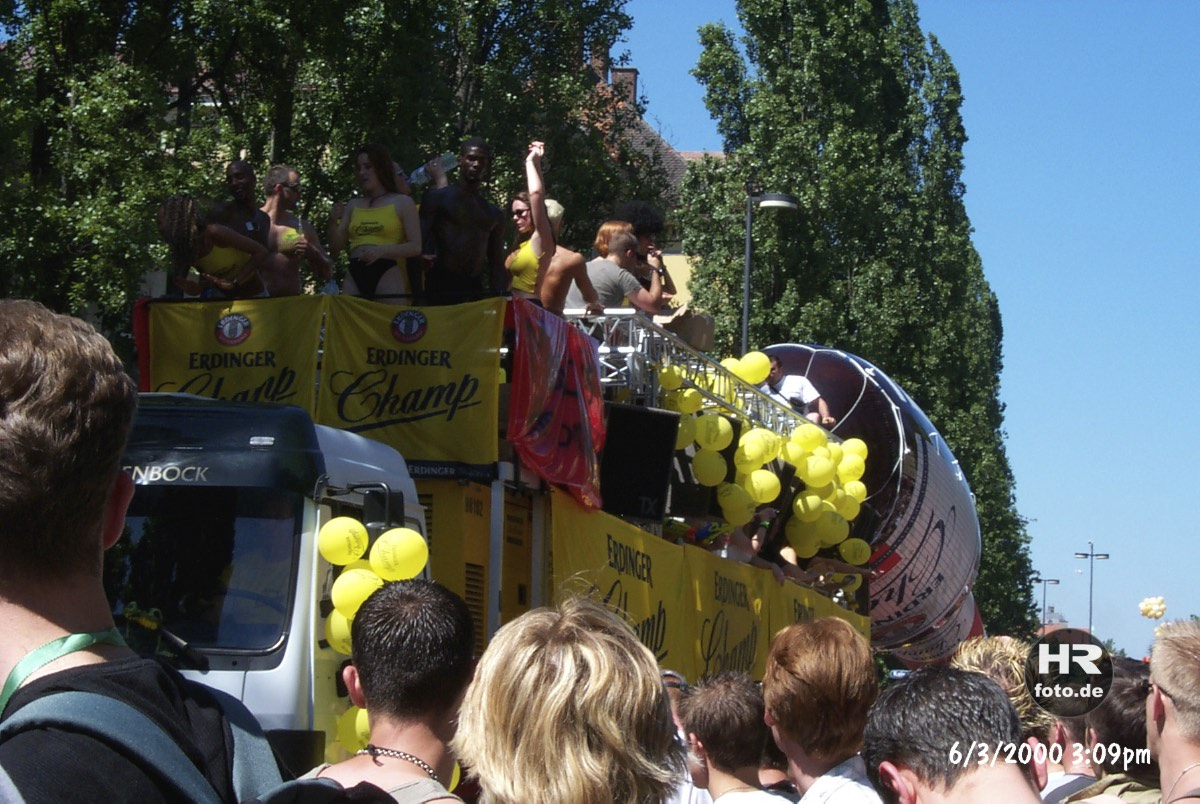

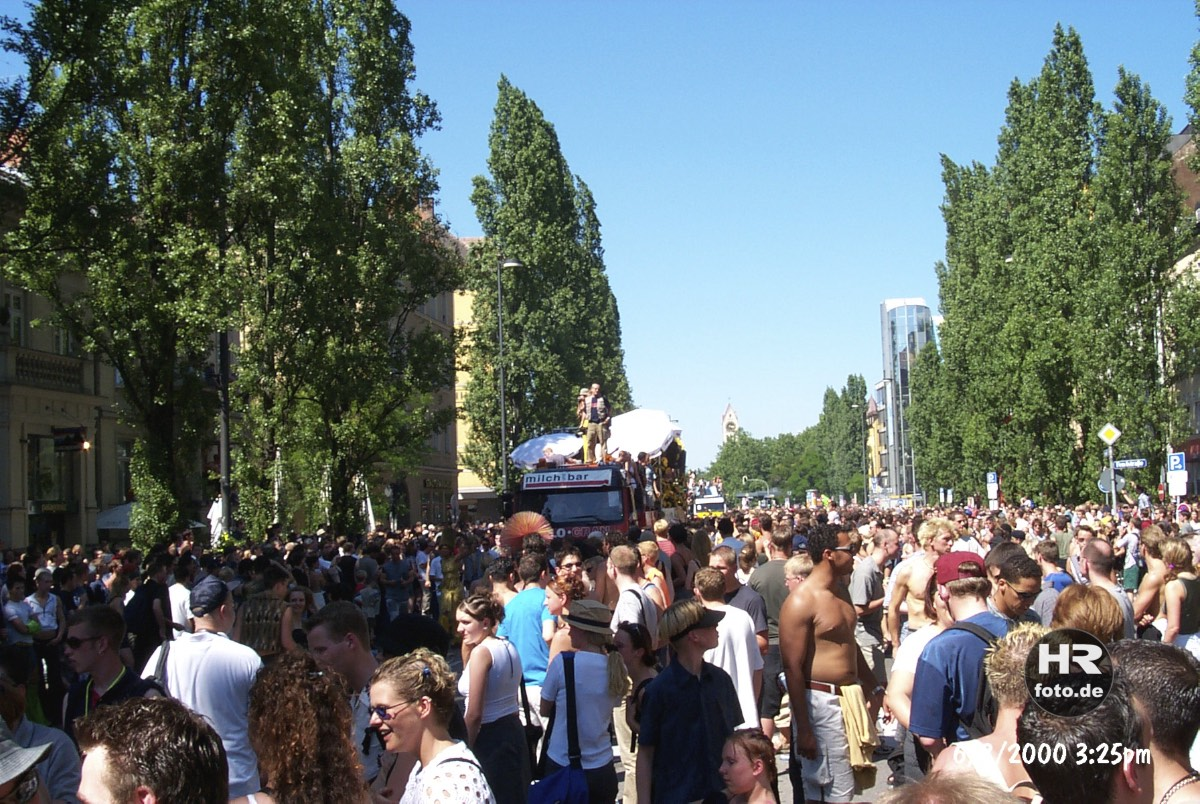

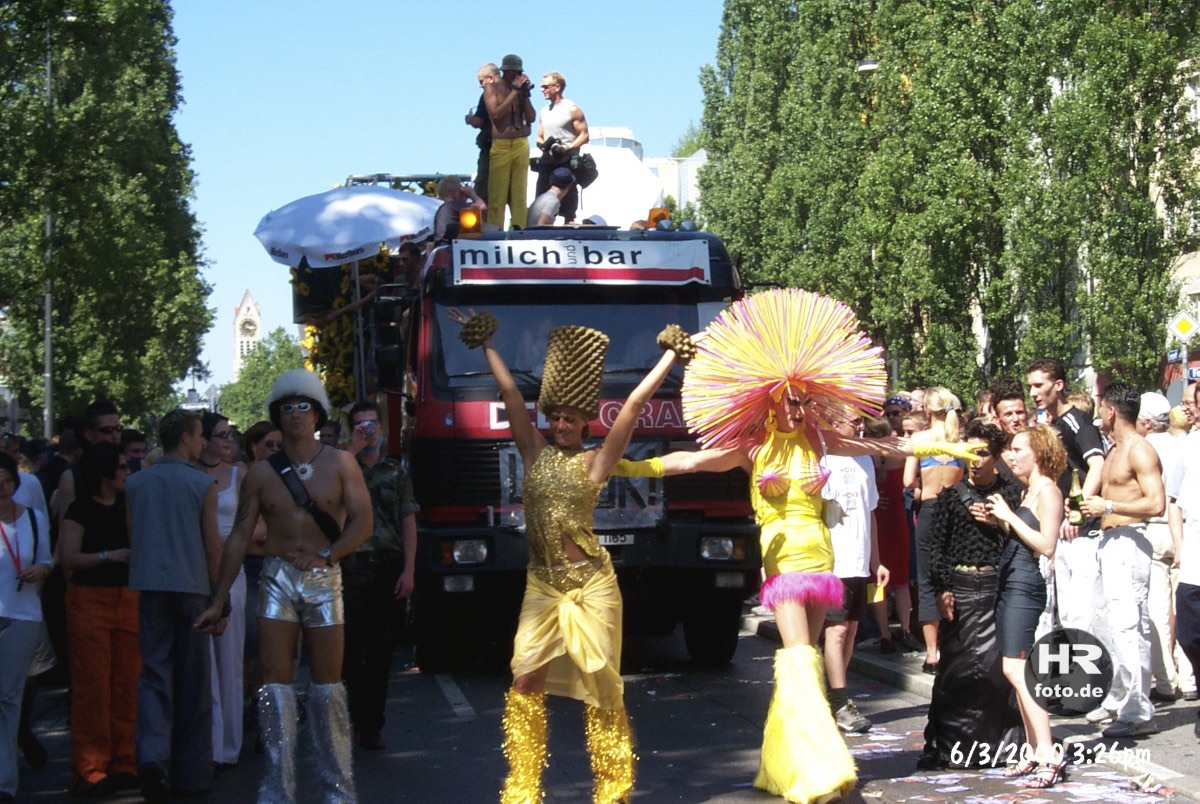

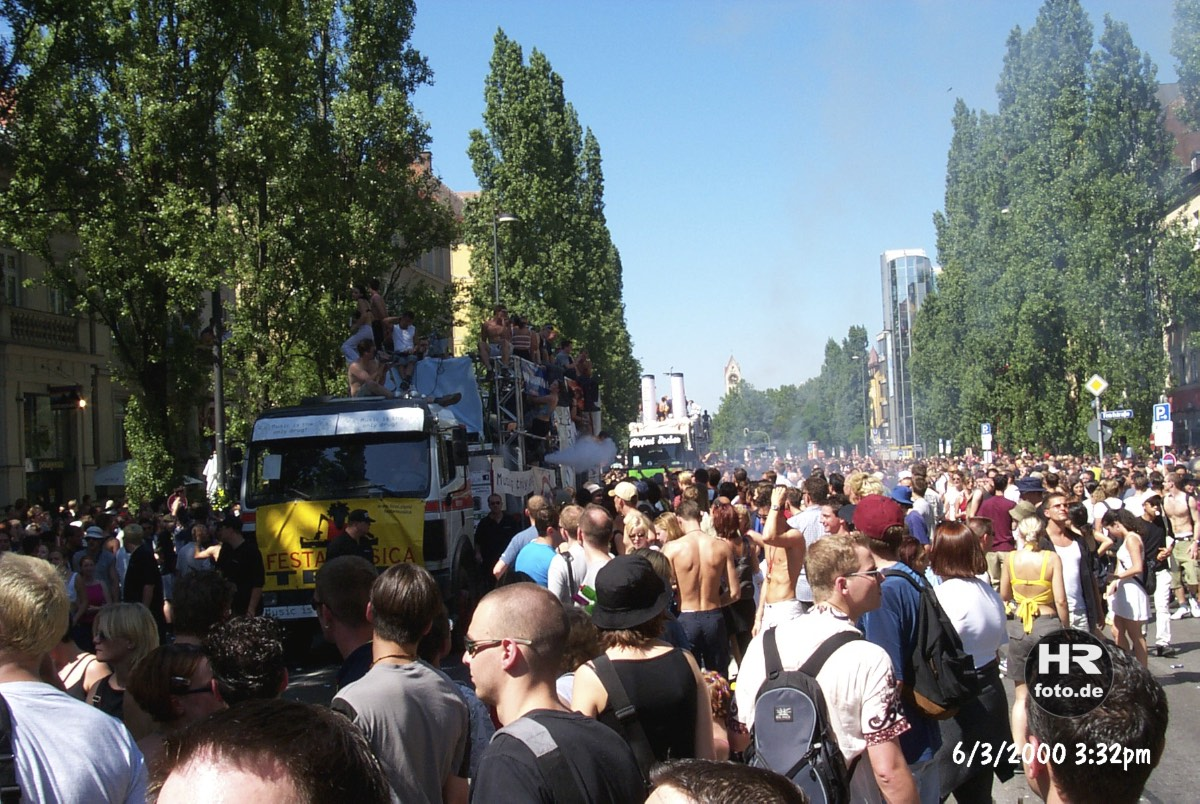

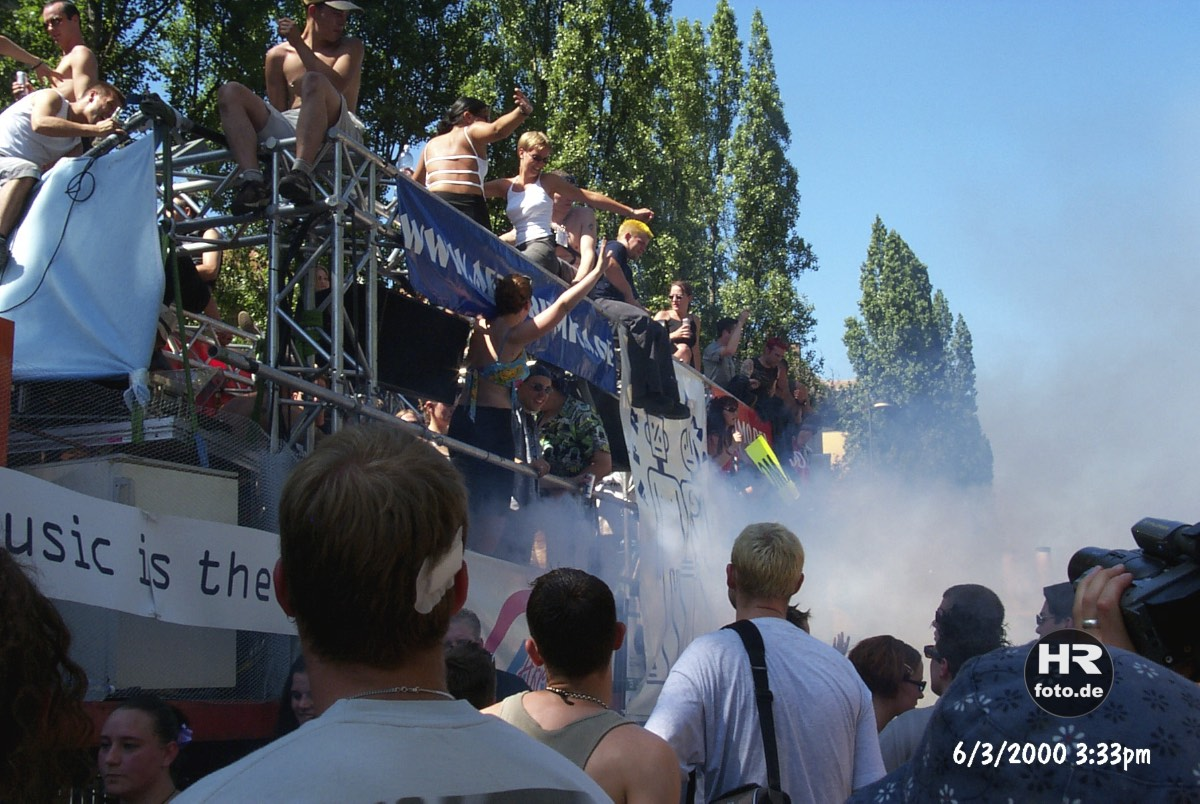
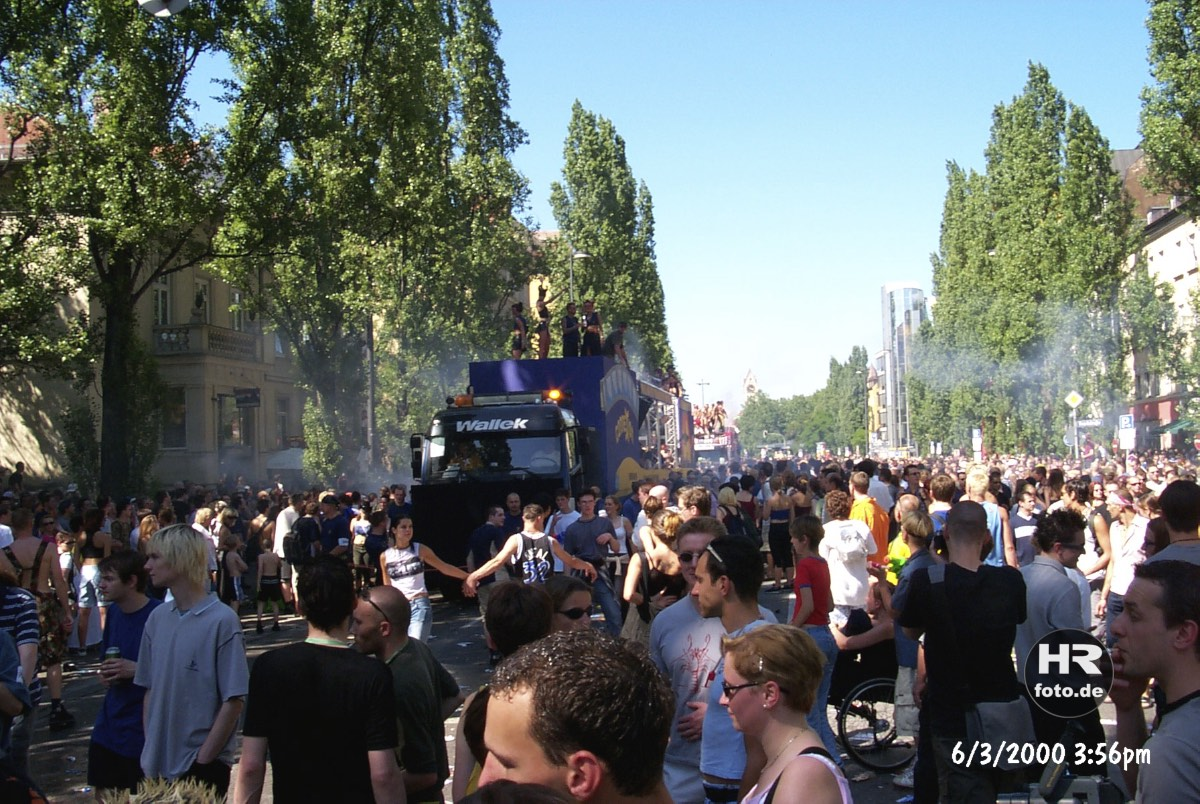

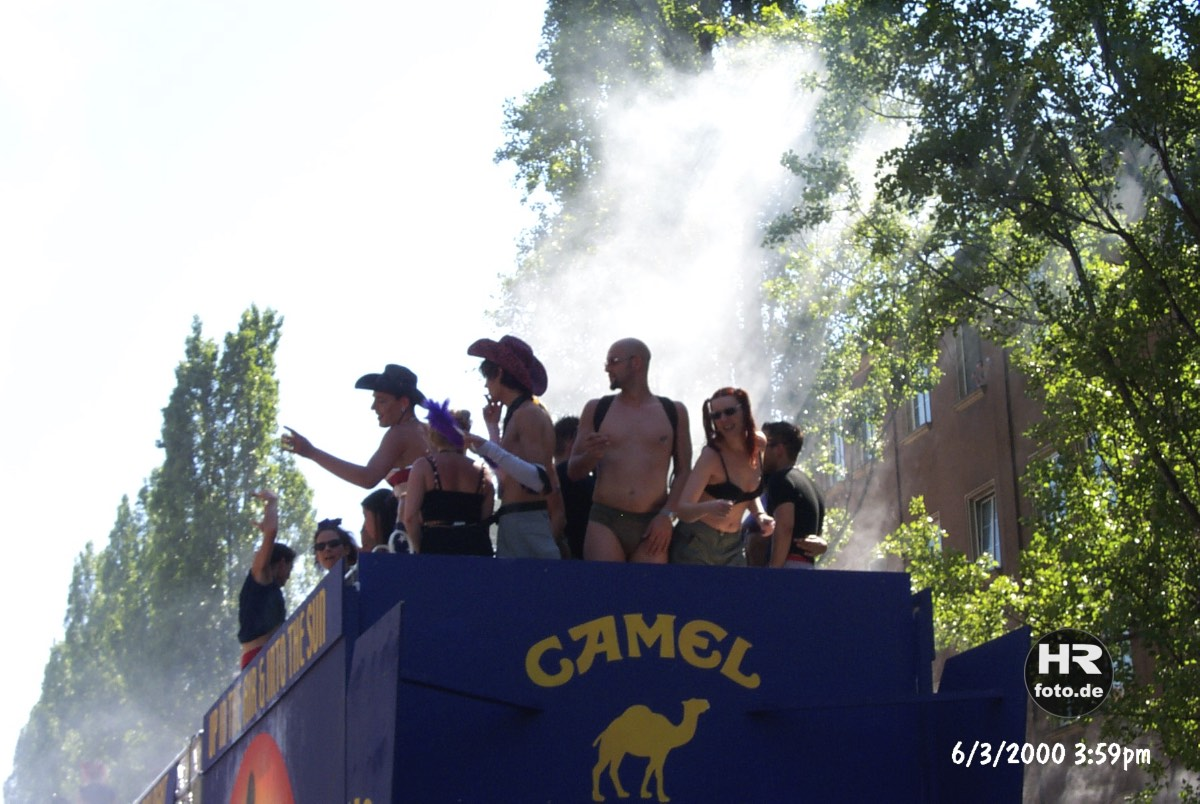

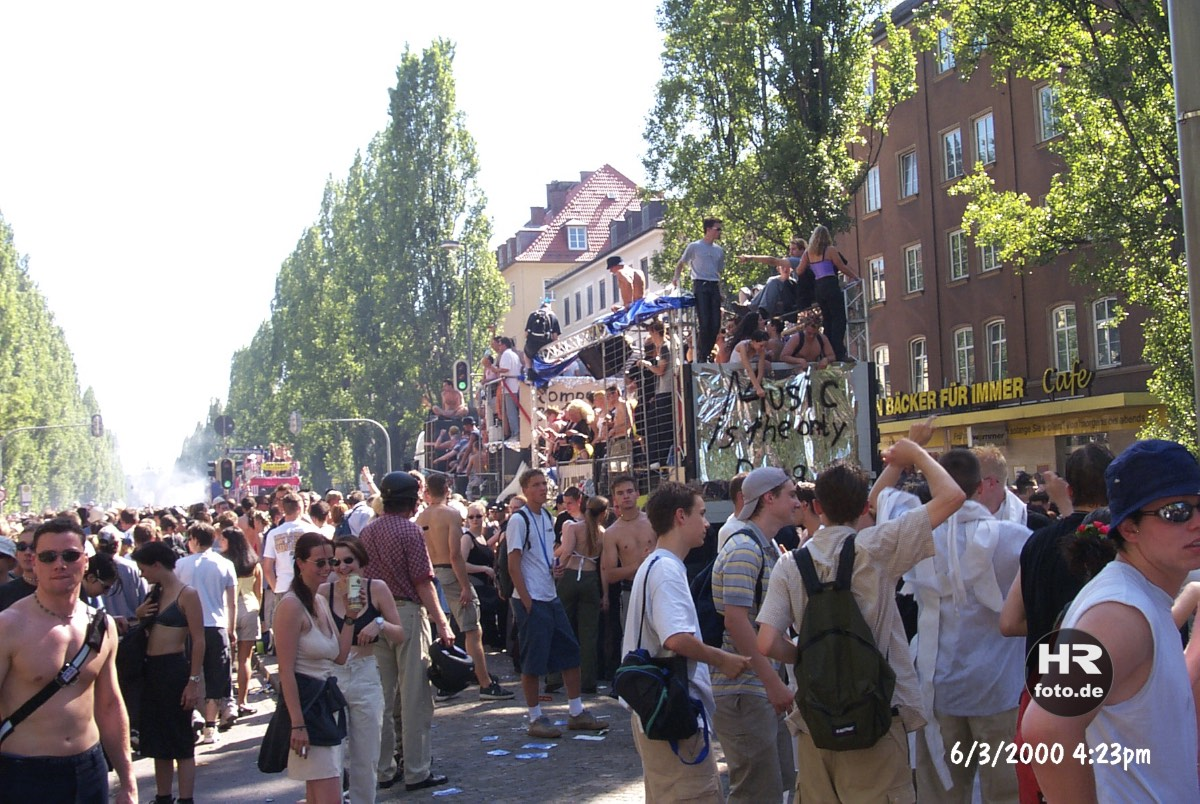

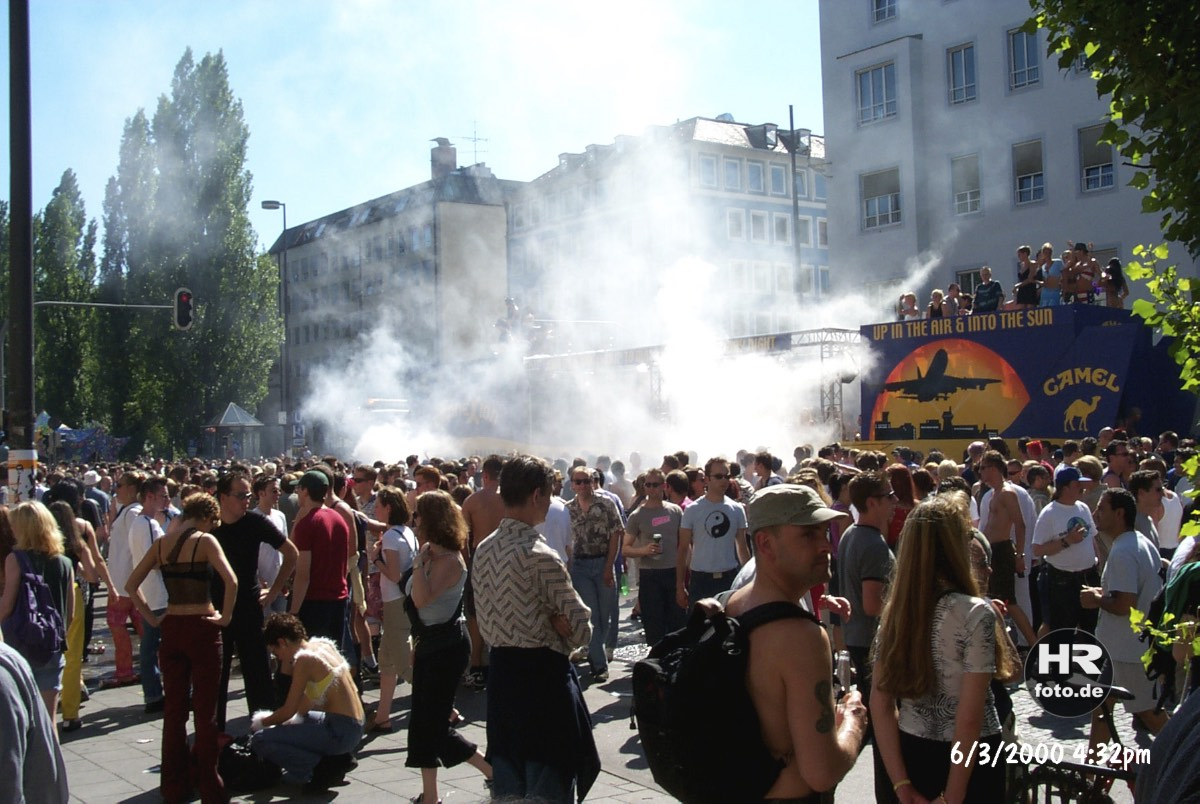

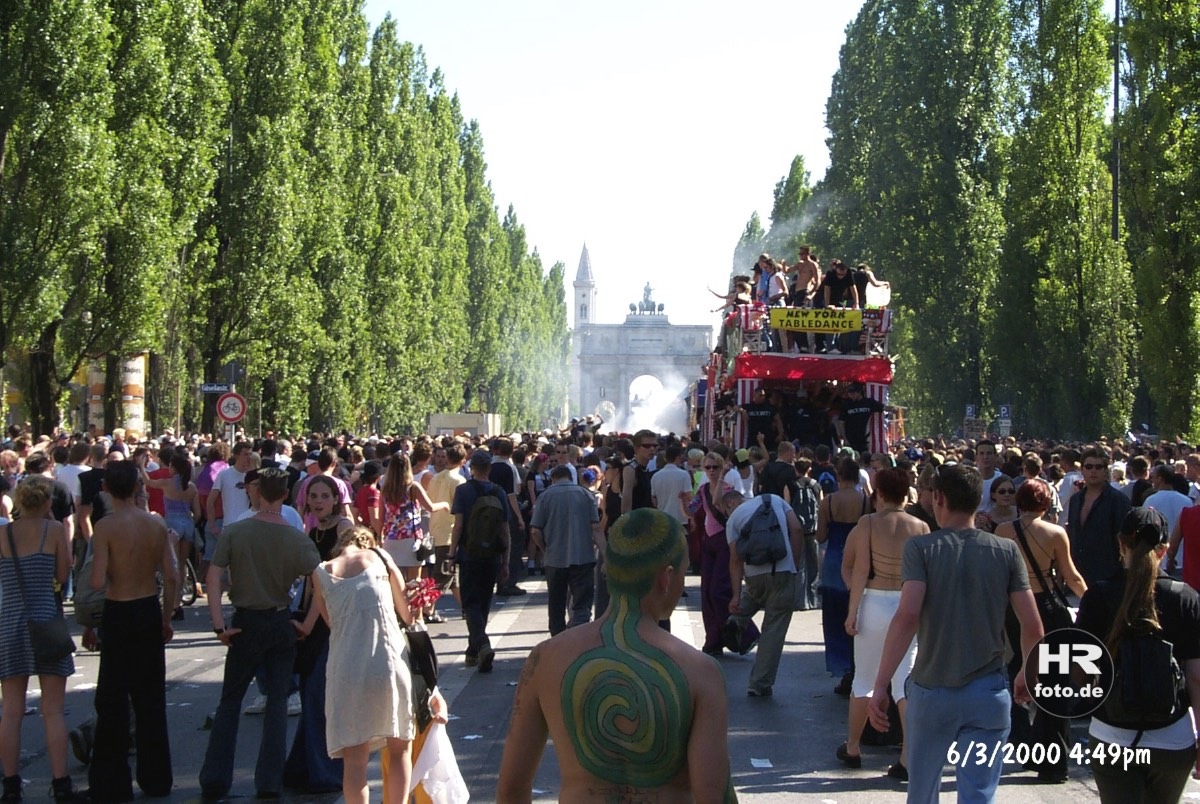

== CD/Vinyl Albums & Singles ==
- 1995 - Various – Munich Union Move - The Parade & 2nd Munich Nightmove (Virgin, 2 × CD, Compilation, 7243 8 40585 2)
- 1996 - Various – Union Move - The Compilation (Virgin, 2 × CD, Compilation, 7243 8 41 823 28)
- 1996 - Tom Wax @ Jan Jacarta – Music Is The Only Drug (The Union Move Hymn) (Virgin, CD, Maxi, 7243 8 93567 2 4)
- 1996 - Tom Wax @ Jan Jacarta – Music Is The Only Drug (Virgin, Vinyl, 12", 7243 8 9356 7 6)
- 1996 - Tom Wax @ Jan Jacarta – Music Is The Only Drug (Virgin Club, Vinyl, 12", Promo, VGP 000077)

== See also ==
- Love Parade
- List of electronic music festivals
- List of technoparades
