= Techno Viking =

2000 video that became an internet meme in 2007

A man offers an inverted bottle of water to the Techno Viking.

Techno Viking is an internet phenomenon and meme based on a video from the 2000 Fuckparade in Berlin, Germany.

== Summary ==
The four-minute video shot by experimental video artist Matthias Fritsch at the Fuckparade on 8 July 2000 begins with the title "Kneecam No. 1". The camera is focused on a group of people dancing to techno music, with a blue-haired woman in front. An apparently drunk/unbalanced man stumbles into the scene and bumps into the woman briefly before steadying himself and beginning to move on.

The eponymous "Techno Viking", a muscular bare-chested man so-named because he is wearing a Mjölnir pendant and has a blond braid and a beard, enters the scene by grabbing the man by the arms after he already let the woman go and was leaving, with the camera showing the confrontation. The Techno Viking pushes the man back in the direction he came, looking at him sternly and then pointing his finger at him to warn him to behave. It was later clarified that the man and Techno Viking were friends and that the latter was warning the former to return to the "drunk tank" truck for attendees that were excessively inebriated.

The camera then follows the Techno Viking as the parade continues. Another observer comes from the back of the scene and offers an inverted bottle of water to him. The Techno Viking starts to dance down Rosenthaler Straße (Note: Coordinates: 52°31′33.8″N 13°24′13.2″E) after drinking from the bottle. Towards the end of the video the "unbalanced" man from earlier is seen sitting next to the cameraman on the truck.

== Reception and release ==
Fritsch uploaded the video to the internet in 2001. Fritsch intended to raise questions of whether the action was real or staged. In 2006 an unknown user re-published it to YouTube, and it went viral in 2007. According to Fritsch, its popularity began on a Central American pornography site.

After being posted on Break.com, it peaked on 28 September at more than 1 million views per day, and was watched by over 10 million people over 6 months. More than 700 responses and edited versions were posted. It was the #1 clip on Rude Tube's series-three episode Drink and Drugs. Mathew Cullen and Weezer wanted to include Techno Viking in their compilation of Internet memes for the "Pork and Beans" music video, but were unable to. Techno Viking was also rendered in oils as part of an art series on internet memes.

By mid-2010, the video had generated over 20 million hits on YouTube alone. As of January 2013, the original version had more than 16 million views. Fritsch mounted an installation and the online Techno Viking Archive "to research the strategies of participatory practice in digital social networks" and presented lectures on the reception of the video. His Music from the Masses project was suggested by the Techno Viking experience: it explores web collaboration by providing silent films for artists to provide soundtracks. In response to legal action by the man featured in the video, access to the Techno Viking video itself has been restricted and annotations on YouTube blocked since late 2009.

== Identity and lawsuit ==
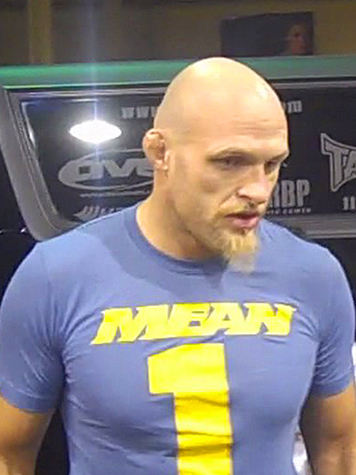
Some suspected Keith Jardine was the Techno Viking before the actual man's lawyer stated this to not be the case.

Fritsch did not know the man's name at the time of filming. A man who appeared in the 2009 "Bodybuilding" broadcast of the German television show segment Raab in Gefahr was taken to be Techno Viking in a YouTube upload. In 2008, fans claimed MMA fighter Keith Jardine was Techno Viking. The lawyer of the Techno Viking asserts that his client had never been a public figure and that he did not want to become one.

The unnamed man's court case against Fritsch concerning infringement of personality rights opened in Berlin on 17 January 2013. In June, a decision was reached for the plaintiff and Fritsch was ordered to pay the man €13,000 in damages, almost all he had made from YouTube ads and sales of Techno Viking merchandise, plus €10,000 in court costs, and to cease publication of his image. Legal scholar Andres Guadamuz noted that the injunction applied only to Fritsch and did not affect other versions of the meme.

== Documentary film ==
Fritsch raised money with a crowdfunding campaign to make a documentary film about the case, The Story of Technoviking, which was released in 2015.
