= Street Parade =

Music event in Zurich, Switzerland

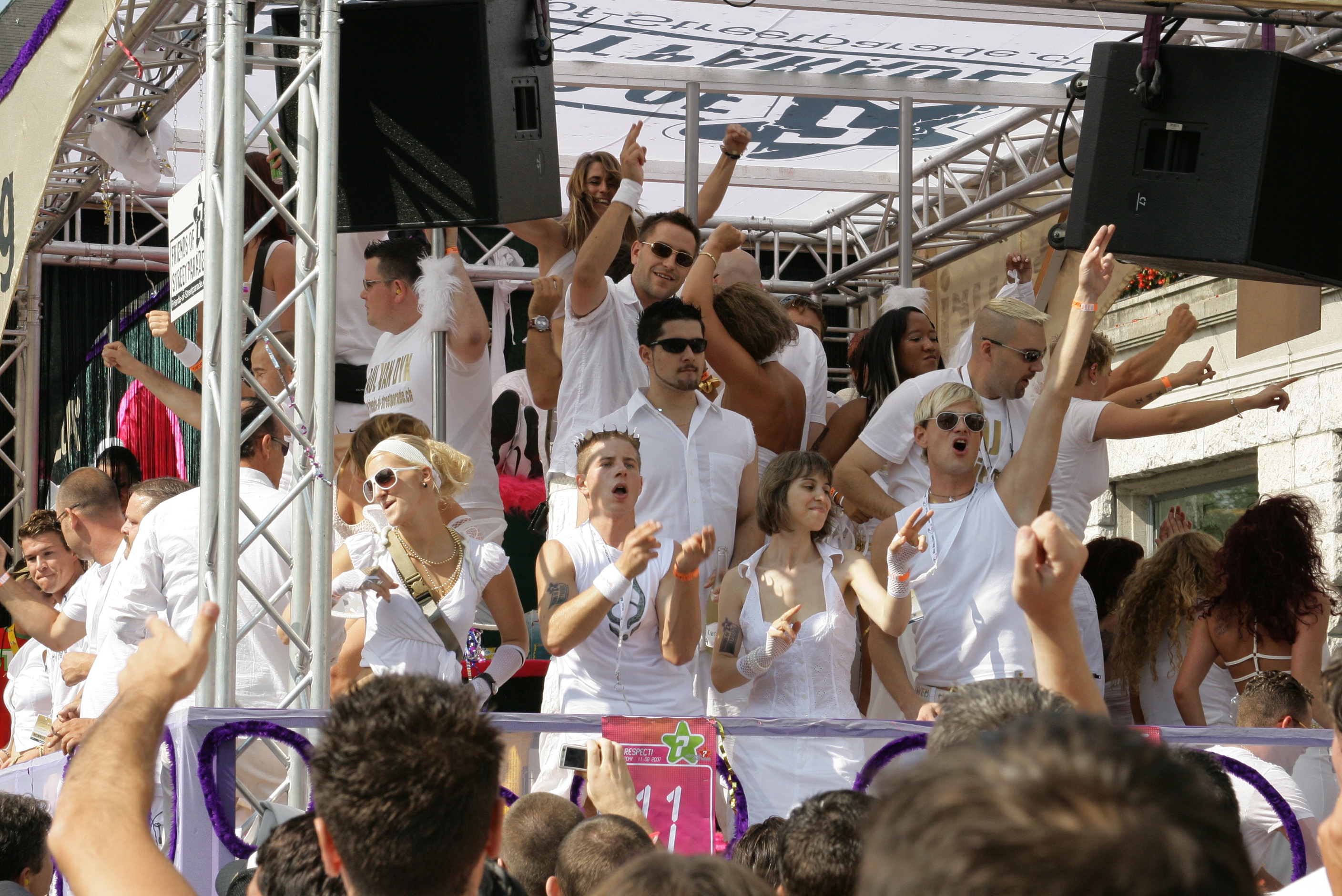
- 16th Street Parade (11 August 2007), Respect
- Genre: Electronic music
- Begins: 1992 (34 years ago)
- Locations: Lake Zurich, Zurich, Switzerland
- Founders: Marek Krynski
- Attendance: 1,000,000+
- Website: Official website

City map of Zurich showing the route and all stages of Street Parade. Until 2003, the parade started on the western banks of Lake Zurich; it now starts on the eastern banks.

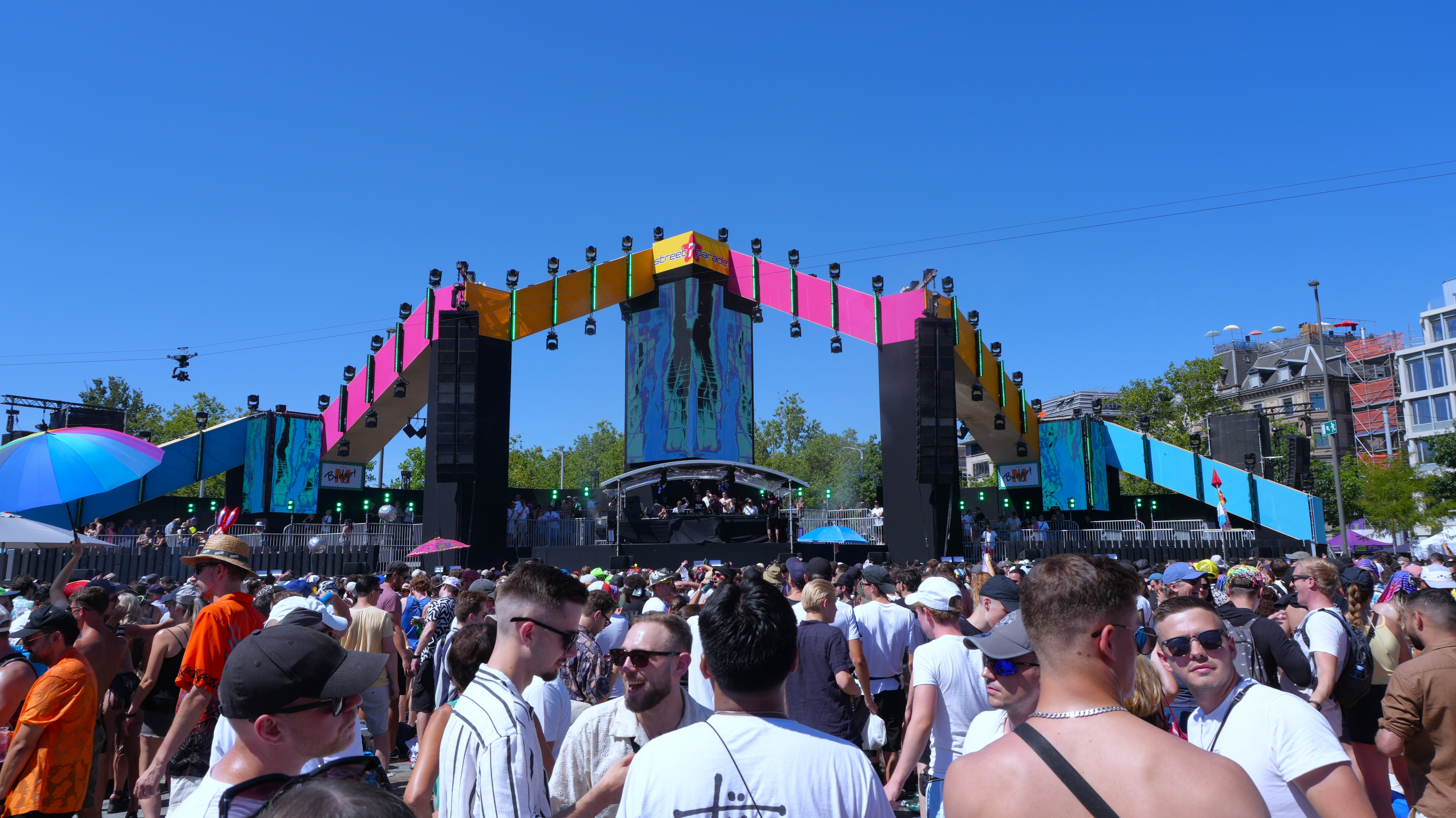
31st Street Parade (2024), Prefer:Tolerance

The Street Parade is a techno music festival in Zurich, Switzerland. With around one million participants, it is the world's most attended technoparade and one of the largest regular parties in the world. The Street Parade takes place annually on the second Saturday in August. Officially a demonstration for freedom, love and tolerance, the parade proceeds along the northern edge of Lake Zurich.

The first Street Parade (the English name is used in German) took place on 5 September 1992, initiated by student Marek Krynski and was officially called the Demonstration for Love, Peace, Liberty, Generosity and Tolerance (German: Demonstration für Liebe, Frieden, Freiheit, Grosszügigkeit und Toleranz). About 1,000 people took part, dancing behind two motorized floats with sound equipment, DJs and dancers known as Lovemobiles.

== Organisation ==
Since 1996, the event has been organised by the Verein Street Parade (Street Parade Association). While the Street Parade now has all the characteristics of a popular festival, legally it is still a political demonstration.

== Chronology ==
Notable events of the Street Parade:

- 1992: The first Street Parade took place with around 1,000 participants.
- 1993: The parade grew in popularity with around 10,000 attendees.
- 1994: The parade faced a ban, which was later overturned due to public protests. The event moved to a new route around Lake Zurich.
- 1995: The parade attracted 150,000 people and released its first official CD.
- 1996: Verein Street Parade (Street Parade Association) was founded to organize the event.
- 2000: The parade was broadcast live on television for the first time.
- 2001: The parade had a record attendance of over one million people.
- 2003: The parade route was reversed due to noise concerns.
- 2005: The event faced financial difficulties but was saved by sponsors. Beer was sold for the first time, leading to some concerns about an increase in aggressive behavior.
- 2007: The parade focused on the theme of "Respect" and attracted around 800,000 people.
- 2009: Despite rain and concerns about swine flu, 600,000 people attended the parade.
- 2010: The parade saw a slight increase in attendance compared to the previous year. A moment of silence was held for the victims of the Love Parade disaster in Duisburg.
- 2011: The parade celebrated its 20th anniversary with around 900,000 attendees.
- 2020 and 2021: The parade was canceled due to the COVID-19 pandemic.
- 2022: The parade returned with nearly one million attendees.
- 2023: The 30th Street Parade saw a similar attendance level as the previous year and a Swiss Federal Councillor participated in the parade for the first time.
- 2024: The 31st Street Parade attracted around 920,000 attendees. The hot weather led to numerous medical incidents.
- 2026: Two large showers were installed along the route to help participants cool down.

== Notable DJs ==
Notable DJs who have participated in Street Parade include: Carl Cox, David Morales, Sven Väth, Chris Liebing, Loco Dice, Michel von Tell, DJ Energy, Felix Kröcher, DJ Hell, Mind Against, DJ Antoine, Dr. Motte, Steve Lawler, and Tom Novy.

== Political aspects ==
According to the event's official website, "The Street Parade is still a demonstration that calls on everyone to live together in peace and tolerance."

== Alternatives ==
Since 1996, a counter event called Antiparade takes place in Zurich on the same day as the Street Parade to provide an alternative to it. Similar to the Fuckparade in Berlin, the goal of this smaller technoparade is to demonstrate against the increasing commercialization of club culture.

== See also ==
- List of electronic music festivals
- List of technoparades
