= Overlap zone =

Zone where radio signals of the same frequency can be received

In radio frequency engineering, an overlap zone occurs where signals from two or more radio stations, transmitting at the same frequency, can be received with comparable intensity. Interference occurs frequently in such a zone.

In order to avoid this, a receiver with directional antenna is used, which can then be aligned in such a way that it will only receive the signal of one transmitter. Alternatively, the signals could be separated using a demodulator in single sideband mode.

With digital radio (Digital Radio Mondiale and Digital Audio Broadcasting being two common types), there is no interference in the overlap zone.
