= Fuckparade =

Annual summer technoparade

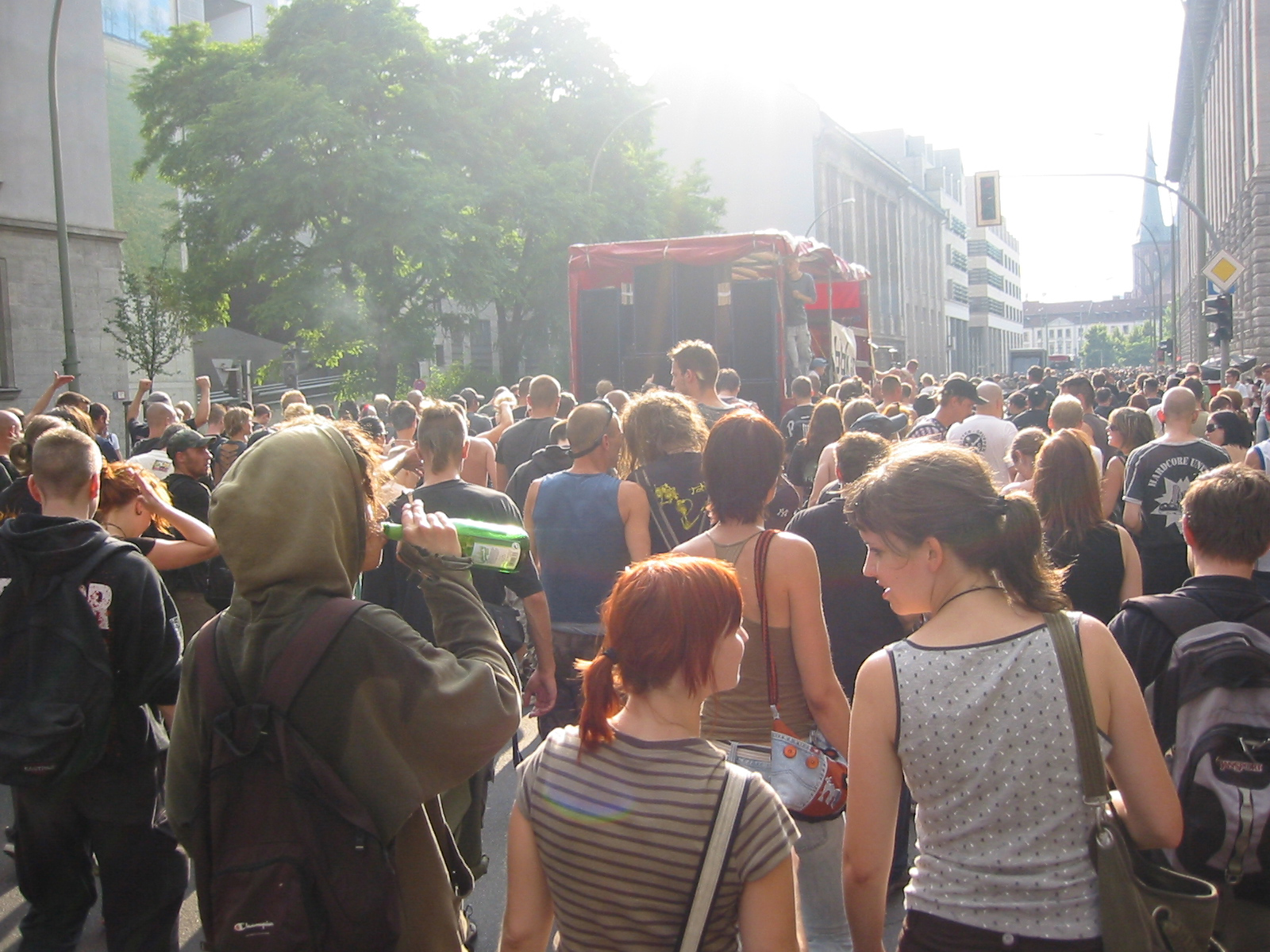
- Fuckparade 2006
- Genre: Electronic music
- Location: Berlin
- Years active: 1997–present
- Website: Official website

The Fuckparade is an annual summer technoparade in Berlin. The event began in 1997 as a demonstration against the increasing commercialisation of culture and public life and the misuse of the right of assembly by purely commercial ventures, in particular the Love Parade. The event has had problems with the authorities since 2001, but in 2007 the Federal Administrative Court of Germany decided that it met the definition of a demonstration.

== See also ==
- Techno Viking
- List of electronic music festivals
- List of technoparades
