= Lake Parade =

Large technoparade organized since 1997 along the shore of Lake Geneva, Geneva

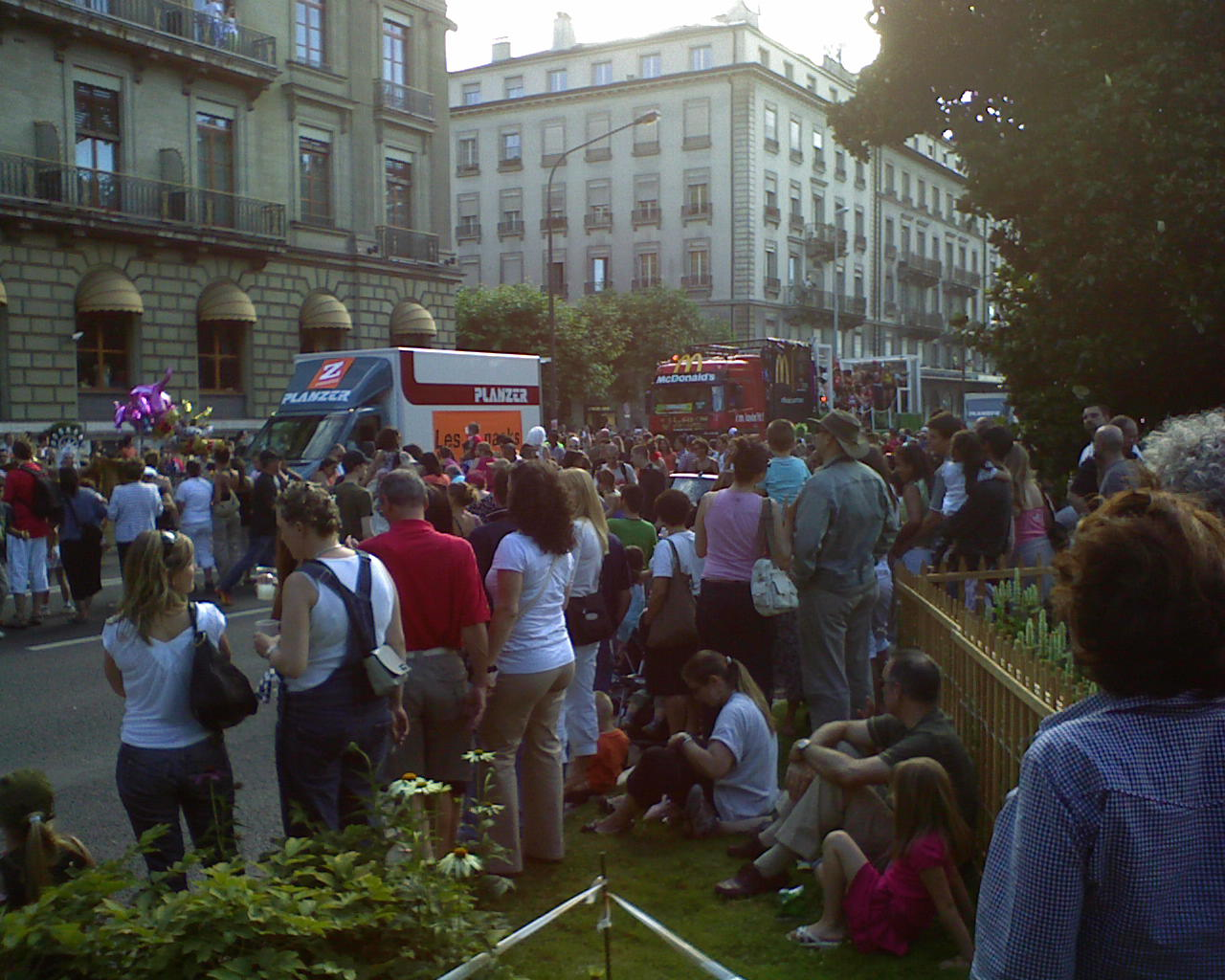
- Lake Parade 7 July 2007
- Genre: Electronic music
- Dates: July
- Locations: Lake Geneva, Switzerland
- Years active: 1997-2015; 2017; 2023-
- Website: Lake Parade

The Lake Parade is a large technoparade that started in 1997, on month of July, in Geneva on the quay of Lake Geneva.

== History ==
The Lake Parade was one of the main Geneva cultural events of the early 2000's. Every year thousands of people went to and followed the parade and then participated in the after parties in the evening. After an interruption in 2016, the Lake Parade took place once again in 2017.

Three editions are not organised due to the COVID-19 pandemic between 2020 and 2022 but on the other hand, a successful 21st edition happens in 2023.

== Program of the Parade ==
The Parade typically starts at parc Mon Repos, on the right side of Lake Geneva. People wishing to participate actively in the Parade by being on one of the Lovemobiles, should be there at 2:00 PM if they want a chance to get on one of the mobiles.

The Parade starts moving at around 4:00 PM and moves slowly along the quay to the other side of the lake right up to the Quai Gustave Ador. There the Parade stops and the night continues with the Lake Sensation.

=== The Love Mobiles ===
Every year there are up to 20 Lovemobiles. Generally each one is sponsored by a different company who decorates the Mobile with its colors. Pioneer once decorated a Mobile using large plasma displays. Each Mobile will generally have several DJs but who shall often play the same kind of music, the most common ones being Techno, Trance, Electro and House. The company sponsoring the Mobile can also insist that those wishing to ride on it wear a certain color theme so as to give a uniform look to the car.

=== Lake Sensation ===
After the Parade, all the Lovemobiles shall come to a stop and all wishing to may climb on. Stages shall also be set up so DJs may perform alongside professional dancers and light shows.

== CD/vinyl albums and singles ==
- 1997 - Lake Parade - Geneva's House & Techno Compilation (Hypnotic Records None)
- 1998 - Lake Parade - The Sound of Geneva's Parade (Energetic Records ENE069)
- 1999 - Lake Parade '99 - The Sound of Geneva's Parade (BMG Ariola (Schweiz) AG 74321 68721 2)
- 1999 - Lake Parade '99 - Rave On Boat (Energetic Records ENE109)
- 1999 - Lake Parade '99 - Splash (The Official Lake Parade Hymn) (BMG Ariola (Schweiz) AG 74321688332)
- 2000 - Lake Parade 2000 - The Sound of Geneva's Parade (BMG Ariola (Schweiz) AG 74321 77020 2)
- 2001 - Lake Parade 2001 - Trance Mix (Muve Recordings Muve 902502)
- 2001 - Lake Parade 2001 - House Mix (Muve Recordings Muve 902422)
- 2001 - Lake Parade 2001 - Bring Your Attitude (The Official Lake Parade Hymn) ([[<Lotuce Records]] None)
- 2002 - Lake Parade 2002 - Trancesession (Muve Recordings Muve 902812)
- 2002 - Lake Parade 2002 - Housession (Muve Recordings Muve 902802)
- 2003 - Lake Parade 2003 (Muve Recordings Muve 903112)
- 2004 - Lake Parade 2004 - Housemix - It's Your Show (Not On Label None)

== See also ==
- List of electronic music festivals
- List of technoparades
