= Maruosa =

- Also known as: Maruosa
- Origin: Tokyo, Japan
- Genres: Breakcore, noisecore, cybergrind, grindcore
- Occupation: Musician
- Instruments: Scream, programming
- Years active: 1999–present
- Label: Rendarec

Maruosa is a Japanese producer of breakcore/cybergrind music based in Tokyo, Japan.

He has been invited to festivals around the world, including CTM in Germany, Glade in the UK, Sónar in Spain, Roskilde in Denmark, Supersonic in the UK, This Is Not Art/Electrofringe in Australia, SXSW in the US, GOGBOT in the Netherlands, and Lausanne Underground Film and Music Festival in Switzerland.

== Discography ==
=== Singles ===
- Maruosa vs Doddodo "Bibibibibibin vol.1" (Rendarec) CDR 2002
- Mushimamire (Hirntrust Grind Media) 7" 2006
- Untitled (Kriss Records) 12" 2008

=== Albums ===
- Exercise and Hell (Rendarec) CD 2007
- Exstream!!!!!!!!! (Rendarec/Grindcore Karaoke) CD 2011
- ALIAS (Self released) Download + Cassette 2017

=== Compilation appearances ===
- "Swimsuit Squad" (Murder Yacht School) CD 2002
- "J-pop terrorizm" (Ihihi) CD 2003
- "G2 Compilation CD" (G2 PRODUCT) CD 2003
- SPICE by Punquestion (M.O.P. Recordings) CD 2003
- Hard Marchan in Osaka (Nazna Oiran Inc) CD 2004
- Tsunbosajiki (Rendarec) CD 2005
- MCP2005gb (Ihihi) CD 2006
- Romz 4th Anniversary Limited CD (Romz) CD 2006
- Misono Days (Studio Warp) Book+CD 2006
- Tough Titties (Goulburn Poultry Fanciers Society) CD 2006
- CTM.07 Audio Compilation (rx:tx) CD 2007
- MIDI_sai Hit Parade (Midiskee Record) CD 2007
- Can Buy Me Love IV (Digital Vomit) 2xCD 2007
- Statement of Intent (Noize:tek Recordings) CD 2007
- Osaka Invasion MixCD (De-fragment) MIX CD 2008
- Osaka Invasion Sampler CD (De-fragment) CD 2008

=== Remixes ===
- Watermelon Dude Zone / Germlin (Megapixxels) CDR 2006
- Black Long Hair Nice Wah Pedal / gagakirize (Teenage Riot)CD 2009
- Edge of Chaos reconstruction/Live&Remixxx / Wrench (Blues Interactions) CD 2011
