= List of experimental music festivals =

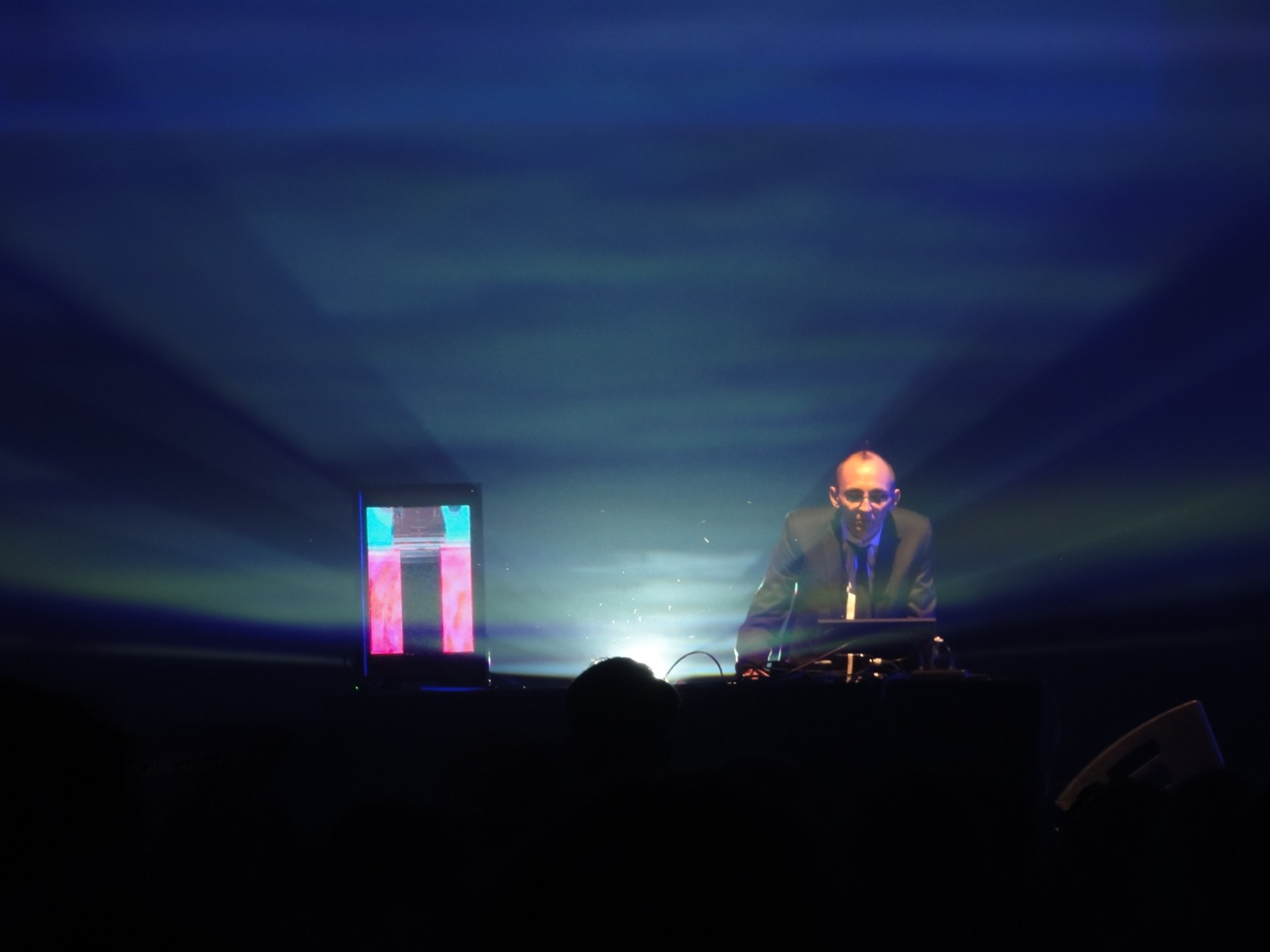

General Information
- Related genres: Experimental music, contemporary classical music, contemporary music, noise rock, electroacoustic music, electronic music
- Location: Worldwide
- Related events: Category:Music festivals, concert tour, music festival, electronic music festivals, contemporary classical music festival, electroacoustic music festivals
- Related topics: John Cage, experimental musicians, electroacoustic improvisation

The following is an incomplete list of experimental music festivals, which encapsulates music festivals focused on experimental music. Experimental music is a compositional tradition that arose in the mid-20th century, particularly in North America, of music composed in such a way that its outcome is unforeseeable. The Groupe de Recherches de Musique Concrète (GRMC), under the leadership of Pierre Schaeffer, organized the First International Decade of Experimental Music between 8 and 18 June 1953, and the phrase was used by musician John Cage as early as 1955. Afterwards saw the development of specific experimental musical instruments, which were featured at various music festivals. Musique concrète is an experimental form of electroacoustic music, and free improvisation or free music is improvised music without any rules beyond the taste or inclination of the musician(s) involved.

== Related lists and categories ==
The following lists have some or total overlap:

- List of music festivals
- List of electronic music festivals

The following categories are related:

- Category:Experimental music festivals
- Music festivals
- Contemporary classical festivals
- Electroacoustic festivals
- Electronic music festivals

== Festivals ==
- Bang on a Can projects, including Marathon Concerts/Long Play Festival and Bang on a Can Summer Festival
- Berlin Atonal
- Big Ears Festival
- CTM Festival
- Festival International de Musique Actuelle de Victoriaville
- GOGBOT
- Hamselyt
- High Desert Soundings
- High Zero
- How to Destroy the Universe festival
- Le Guess Who?
- Music Biennale Zagreb
- MUTEK
- New Interfaces for Musical Expression
- New Music America
- Noise Fest
- Noisefest
- Norbergfestival
- NWEAMO
- Murf/Murw Festival
- Okuden Music
- Olympia Experimental Music Festival
- OM Festival
- Other Minds
- Psych Tent
- Roadburn Festival
- TodaysArt
- Unsound Festival
- Warsaw Autumn
- Vendrebruit 13

== See also ==
- List of experimental musicians
- List of music festivals
- Experimental music
- Live electronic music
