= Bas van Koolwijk =

Dutch artist (born 1966)

Bas van Koolwijk (born in 1966) is a Dutch video and audio artist.

== Biography ==
Bas van Koolwijk was born in Nijmegen in 1966. He studied painting and received the degree from the Utrecht School of the Arts, Netherlands. He lives and works in Utrecht.

In 1998, he started using video for installation, then he found out that he was interested more in the characteristics of the images and sounds. He thought these interference and noises seem to have their own visual language. With this thought, he connected back to his painting's formalistic approach that he could experiment and composite with these abstract elements of image and sound, also abandoned the narrative stories.

Furthermore, van Koolwijk works with disturbances such as feedback and signals produced by the video that create both image and sound. He often develops his own electronics and software to experiment with the medium-specific characteristics of digital and analog video. The result is a visible interference reminiscent of a malfunctioning videotape. This reference to the analog era, of a capricious and chaotic nature, is repeated in his works. It opens up and exposes the illusions of the machine and the televised image.

=== Artworks (video and installation) ===
His work has appeared at media festivals worldwide since 2000, including at the Impakt Festival, the GOGBOT Festival, Ars Electronica, the Elektra Festival and Netmage. Some of his early video works are distributed at LIMA, the Netherlands. One of the series, TST, was selected for the Digital Canon (1960–2000) research project.

=== Delay Line Memory ===
Delay Line Memory (2014) is an impromptu live audio-visual performance, interplay between man and machine, in an attempt to find a common language in electronic sound, rhythm, and color. Patterns are temporarily stored within a 'delay line memory', a form of sequential access memory that was used for early computing. By delaying the data signal, it is effectively memorized for a given period of time. This work could be performed as a solo by van Koolwijk (electronics & visuals) or in combination with drums by Gert-Jan Prins. In 2016, van Koolwijk released video demos on his website DLM.

==== FDBCK/AV ====
The first video of this series, Red Flag, was released in 2005 and is produced with software applications (Max/MSP) that were developed for the live performance FDBCK/AV. The 'flagging' seen in this video is of a digital nature entirely, but its logic is based on analog video processing. The same logic applies to the computations by which FDBCK/AV creates a feedback control circuit between audio and video signals. This series includes three main abstract videos: Red Flag, Silver (2005), and Curvilinear (2014).

In his solo exhibition in 2007, he presented Red Flag and Silver as the high-resolution version with projection. Later, in 2014, he created a live-set version Curvilinear for the projection within the Sphæræ dome, which he performed at the GOGBOT Festival (Enschede). Furthermore, he released a twelve-minute video with the same title and screening at the AxS Festival (Pasadena, California, United States).

==== TST ====
TST (2000) is a series of abstract video compositions based on video disturbances, which consists of minimalistic color lines and blocks, and with flickering movement. Van Koolwijk started with experimenting analog video technologies, by using the electronic signal of the CRT monitor to produce abstract images. Then he captured these image materials into the computer and composited all the materials. Meanwhile, as he would like to monitor the visual and acoustic, he split the video signal to one CRT and another through an audio mixer converted into audio. In the end, he recorded the composited audio and served as the video soundtrack. This series contains three video compositions: TST 02, TST 03, TST 04.

With the same principle, van Koolwijk later produced another abstract video, Five, (2002) as part of a series of abstract video compositions.

==== Other video and installation works ====
- 2018 Automatone
- 2017 ON / OFF
- 2015 Black Square Projector
- 2014 Mercury to Saturn, including Earth
- 2013 PULSED – presented as an installation at the Bogong Elscyric Festival 2013, Australia
- 2013 UNCLASSIFIED
- 2010 GREEN – presented at the Optofonica event for Museum Night Amsterdam
- 2009 Sonolevitation 3D – presented at the 30th anniversary of the Netherlands Media Art Institute
- 2005 RGB Improv_1&2
- 2004 UBIK
- 2004 Urban[ISM] – collaboration with Christian Toonk and Ryan Parteka
- 2003 OZONE – collaboration with Derek Holzer, following a residence at Medienturm, Graz
- 2003 PETLAB – presented at the Academiegalerie in Utrecht, with Christian Toonk and Ronald Nijhof
- 2001 LMR [audio
- 2000 Hardcore REWIND
- 1999 CONNECTING

== Live performance ==
- 2014 Delay Line Memory, GOGBOT Festival, Atak, Enschede
- 2014 FDBCK AV – Curvilinear, Sphæræ, GOGBOT Festival, Enschede
- 2013 RUNAWAY AV – Sphæræ, Ars Electronica, Linz, Austria
- 2008 10K PFFA – Elektra Festival, Usine C, Montreal, Quebec, Canada
- 2007 FDBCK/AV 3D – STRP Festival, Eindhoven
- 2006 YOKOMONO/VIDEO – Steim, Amsterdam
- 2006 baroch - 29 January 2006, Vishal, Haarlem
- 2005 db – with Wojciech Kosma, Michal Skiba and Duszan Korczakowski; commissioned by Unsound Festival 2005, Kraków, Poland
- 2005 desktopjam – Fabrikaat, Artis Gallery, 's-Hertogenbosch
- 2004 Maps~ / Psychonavigators – performed at BAK Gallery, with Derek Holzer and Christian Toonk
- 2004 RGB – Umatic event at Club Moira, Utrecht

== SYNCHRONATOR project ==
SYNCHRONATOR is a video and audio research project initiated by Bas van Koolwijk and Gert-Jan Prins. They met and saw each other's work while they were presenting their own audio-visual performance at Impakt Festival in Amsterdam (2005). This encounter let them find many similarities in their work, also the problem they both have. So they started to develop a device together with the residency project at Impakt's laboratory (Utrecht, the Netherlands) in June 2006. Bas van Koolwijk works mainly with digital equipment also convert the video signal to audio signal, while Gert-Jan Prins works with analog techniques and transfer the audio signal to the video signal shown on the CRT TV set. The major problem they met is the complicated or distorted video and audio signals cannot be recorded on tape or accepted by video equipment like a projector. After six weeks, they developed a prototype of SYNCHRONATOR that allows them to synchronize every form of data input and then turn it into an official video signal.

The released SYNCHRONATOR AV device in 2009 transforms the audio (three inputs on each of the primary color channels of the video signal) into a composite video signal. Later in 2018, they developed an HD version by updating the connection to a beamer, flat-screen television, or capture card with HDMI signal.

=== Devices released ===
- 2018 SYNCHRONATOR HD
- 2013 SYNCHRONATOR ColorControl
- 2010 SYNCHRONATOR AV second edition
- 2010 SYNCHRONATOR AV automated color interface
- 2009 SYNCHRONATOR AV first edition

=== Events (workshop, performance) ===
- 2014 Synchronator workshop
- 2012 Synchronator Orchestra
- 2007 Tesla residency – performance took place as part of the Club Transmediale 2007
- 2006 'Impakt Works' residency and workshop

=== Another audio device ===
Mole-Rat is an EMF audio device which was released in September 2015. This audio device allows users to discover the electromagnetic fields in the living environment.

== See also ==
- Interlaced video
