= A-Z West =

Compound and art center in Joshua Tree, California

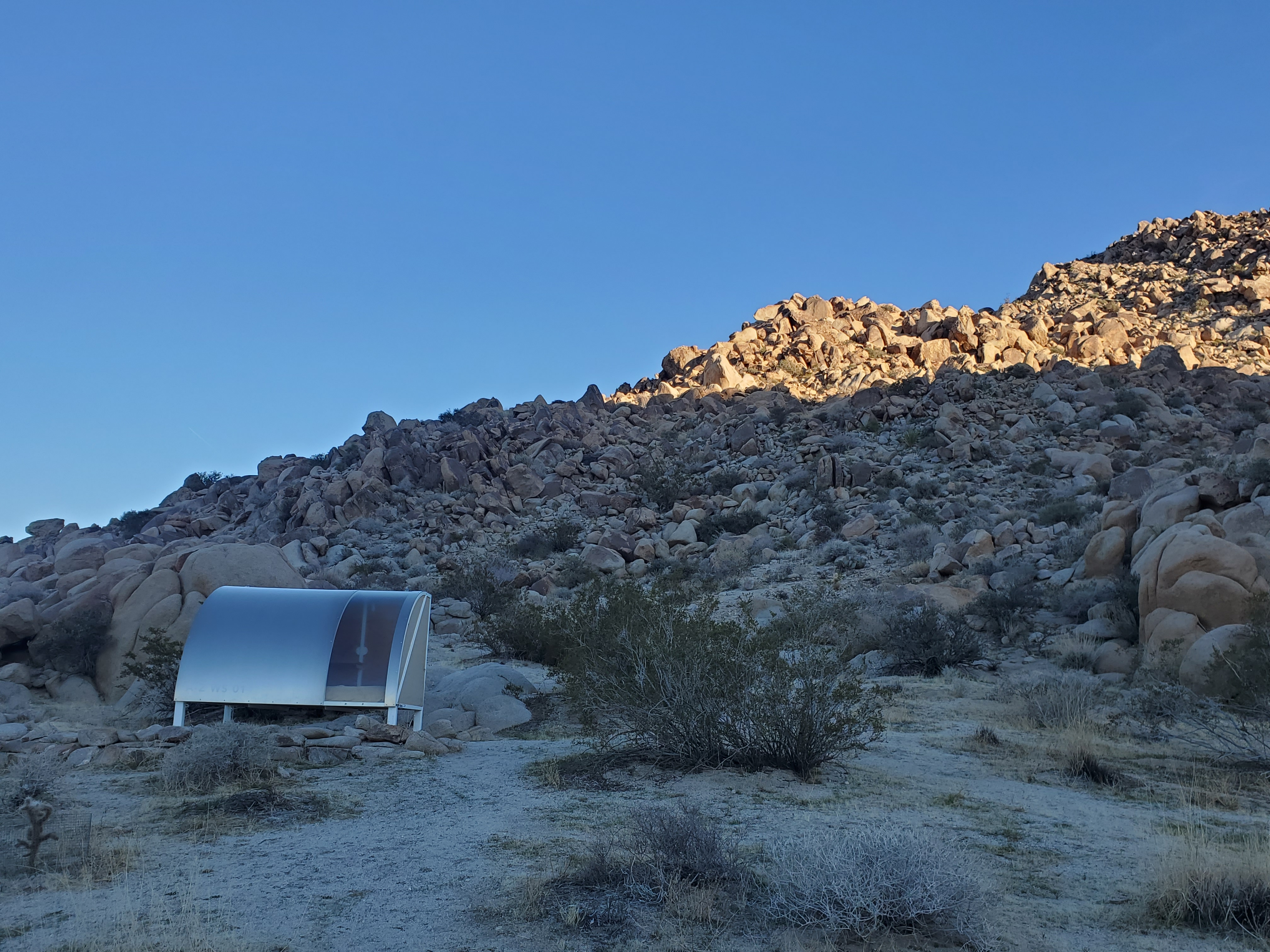
- A Wagon Station by Andrea Zittel, at A-Z West
- Interactive map of A-Z West
- Location: Joshua Tree, California, U.S.
- Coordinates: 34.1276°N 116.2904°W
- Acreage: 80

A-Z West is an 80-acre compound and artwork by artist Andrea Zittel, located in the Mojave Desert in Joshua Tree, California. Zittel conceived of A-Z West as a project to explore psycho-social aspects of day-to-day living, "what it means to live," and functional systems for desert life. Zittel lived in A-Z West from 2000 to 2022. Artworks previously created by Zittel on the A-Z West compound include The Wagon Station Encampment, Regenerating Field (2002), and Planar Pavilions at A-Z West (2017).

In 2002, Zittel and a group of collaborators - Lisa Anne Auerbach, John Connelly, Shaun Caley-Regen and Andy Stillpass - formed High Desert Test Sites (HDTS). Zittel stayed as the primary producer and supervisor for two decades. The nonprofit High Desert Test Sites assumed the management and stewardship of the land and artworks around 2022, and currently runs residencies, educational workshops, and art exhibitions on and around A-Z West.

There are four original homestead cabins on the compound that Zittel converted into The A-Z West House, a library, a caretaker’s house, and additional dwelling units. The A-Z West House contains artworks based on Zittel’s idea of “life practice” - functional aesthetics for everyday living, from furniture to a chicken coop. Functional artworks in the home include Aggregated stacks, Linear sequence, and Hooks, energetic accumulators. Art writer Terry Myers discussed the philosophy of artist Robert Rauschenberg - known for exploring the space between art and life - as an inspiration to Zittel. Others have brought attention to Zittel's focus on the elemental aspects of life and environmental thinking,

Every part of Zittel’s environment, from the home she lives in to the clothes she wears and the bowls she eats from, is intentionally designed to align with a unique mode of existence that draws on Modernist utopianism, contemporary environmentalism and progressive self-sufficiency.

— Jonathan Griffin

The A-Z West Studio was built in 2010-2011, and includes a ceramics workshop, wood shop, and weaving studio with seven floor looms, in addition to an office and the A-Z West Works Studio Store. A-Z West Works produces ceramics, textiles, and clothing products at the A-Z West Studio.

== History ==
A-Z West was a continuation of the model established by A-Z East in Brooklyn, NY. A-Z East originated as a 200 square foot storefront at 72 S. 8th St. in Williamsburg, Brooklyn, where Zittel first began experimenting with living structures and started to gain recognition for the A-Z project. In 1994, the project moved to 150 Wythe Ave. in Brooklyn, a 3 story row house, which Zittel turned into a showroom testing grounds for her experimental structures for living, opening to the public for weekly viewings, while she continued to live in it.

In 1999-2000, Zittel moved to Joshua Tree and purchased a 5 acre parcel that slowly grew to the 80 acre A-Z West compound.

From 2018-2020, A-Z West also included a satellite project in Wonder Valley, California with two homestead cabins, The Experimental Living Cabins.

== See also ==
- Andrea Zittel

== Additional bibliography ==
- Richard Julin. (2011). Andrea Zittel: Lay of My Land. Presetl, Munich (Penguin Random House). OCLC 729342177
