= TodaysArt =

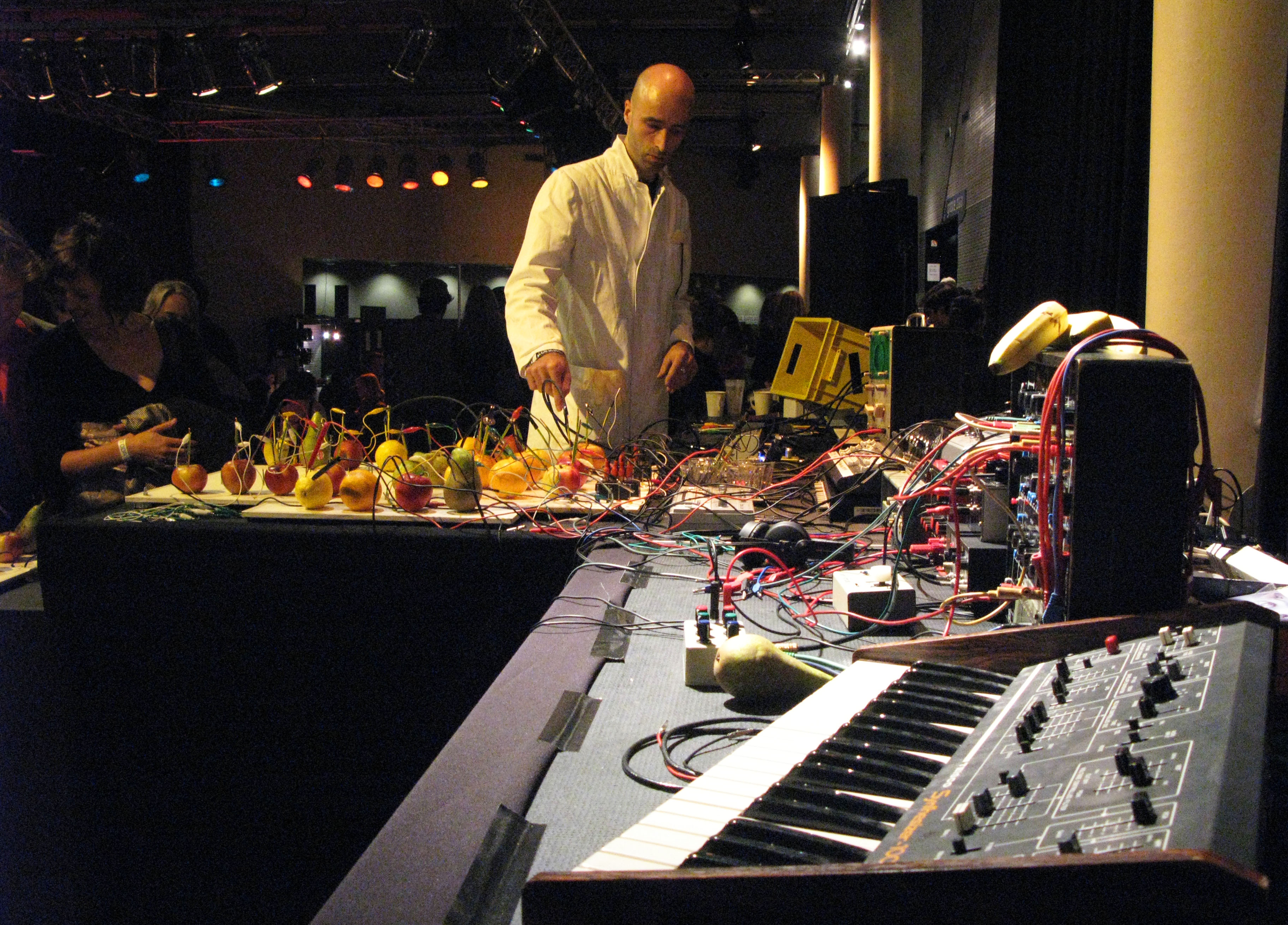
- Art installation at TodaysArt festival, 2008.
- Genre: media arts, electronic music, digital culture, video and visual arts, film, photography, fashion, performing arts, theatre, contemporary dance
- Dates: 2005
- Locations: The Hague, Netherlands
- Years active: 2002–present
- Founders: Olof van Winden
- Attendance: 10,000
- Capacity: 10,000
- Website: Official website

TodaysArt is the annual international festival for Art, Music and Technology in The Hague, Netherlands that takes place in the end of September. It is also the name of the cultural production agency TodaysArt (Stichting The Generator) that produces the festival and other TodaysArt branded events. The festival offers a selection of art and entertainment that can be described as experimental or cutting-edge, while the music program, though varied, usually features a considerable amount of electronic music. The festival is staged in a shifting selection of venues around the city, many of which are usually not used for art or performances.

The artists come from a variety of countries, are tasked by the festival with presenting their creative vision about what Art is Today in terms of music, video and visual arts, film, photography, fashion, performing arts, theatre, contemporary dance and the other disciplines and crossovers that the festival features.

The productions and performances are often made especially for the festival.

== Other events ==
TodaysArt are among the 8 major festivals that make up the We Are Europe association. They collaborate on the SHAPE creative platform along with 15 other festivals, focusing on 48 emerging artists each year. They also interact with other cultural institutions through the International Cities of Advanced Sound.

The festival has collaborated on a long list of events and other festivals, with some bearing the TodaysArt brand. Among such collaborators are the Arts Council of Mongolia at the Ulaanbaatar International Media Art Festival, the Sónar Festival in Barcelona, Insomnia Festival, Nuits Sonores, Intonal Festival, CTM Festival, Rokolectiv Festival REUSE festival in Kuwait National Centre for Contemporary Arts in Moscow, and the Tehran Annual Digital Art Exhibition (TADAEX).

== See also ==
- List of experimental music festivals
- List of electronic music festivals
