= High Desert Soundings =

American annual music and arts festival held in Wonder Valley, California

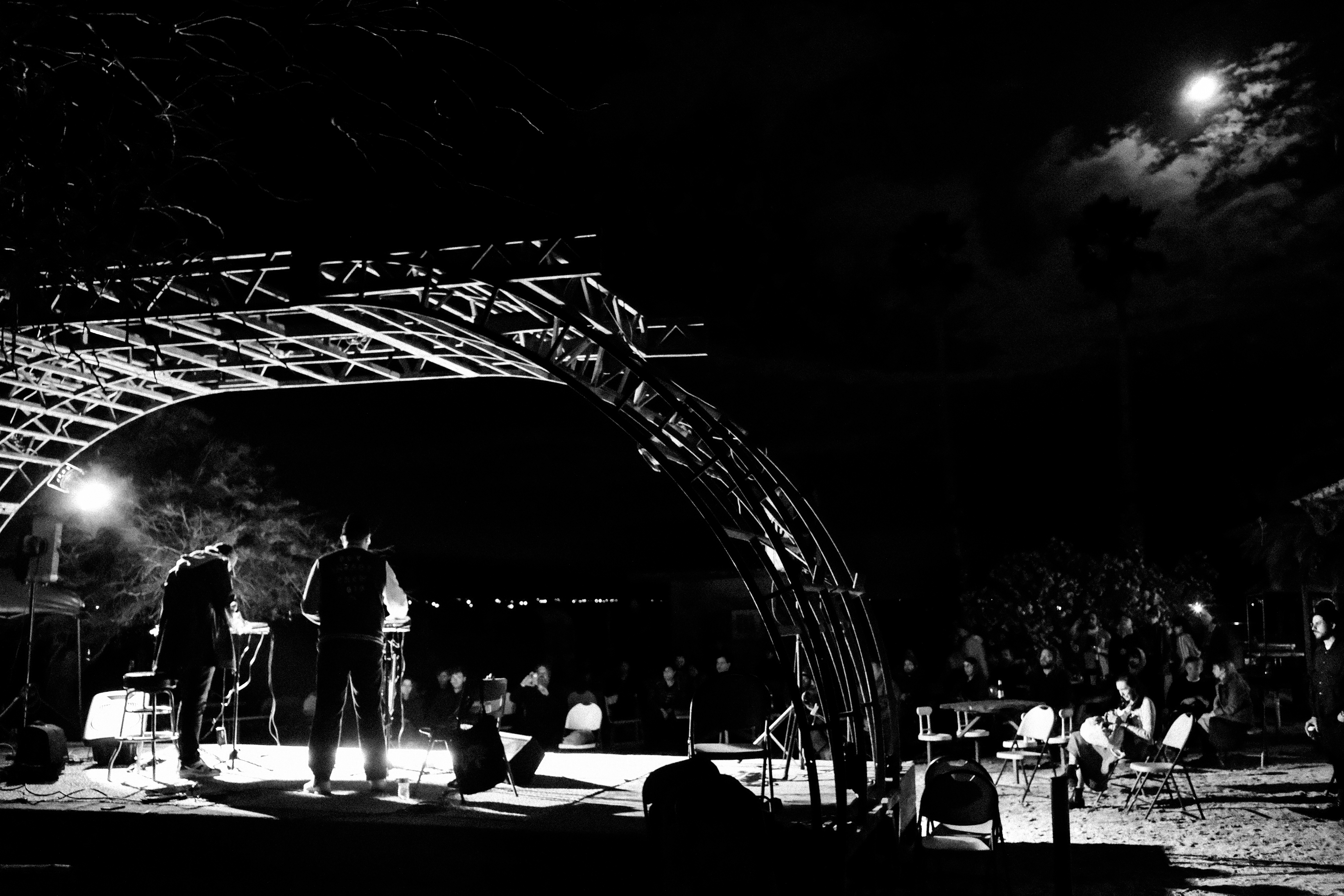
- High Desert Soundings in 2019
- Genre: Experimental, Improvisational, Jazz
- Locations: The Palms Restaurant (Wonder Valley, California, U.S.)
- Years active: 2018-present
- Founders: T.J. Borden & Daniel Meyer-O’Keeffe
- Website: highdesertsoundings.com

High Desert Soundings is a two-day outdoor music festival held at The Palms Restaurant in Wonder Valley, California focused on experimental, improvisational and immersive performances. The festival was founded by cellist T.J. Borden and composer Daniel Meyer-O’Keeffe in 2018, and is currently curated and organized by Borden and Ethan Marks.

Notable acts from previous High Desert Soundings line-ups include: Wolf Eyes, King Britt, Agriculture, Vinny Golia, Michelle Lou, Max Jaffe, Victor Vieira-Branco, Katie Porter, Patrick Shiroishi, Matt Robidoux, Haydeé Jiménez, Sarah Hennies, Audrey Chen & Phil Minton, Palberta, Michael Pisaro-Liu, Laura Steenberge, and Jeph Jerman.
