= Andrea Zittel =

American artist

- Born: 1965 (age 60–61); Escondido, California
- Education: Rhode Island School of Design, San Diego State University
- Known for: Installation art, Social Practice, Contemporary Artist
- Website: zittel.org

Andrea Zittel (born 1965) is an American artist based in Joshua Tree, California, United States. Her art and community work encompasses modes of living and design practice in an ongoing investigation that explores the questions "How to live?" and "What gives life meaning?"

Zittel's work has been described as an "expansive approach to art and space making, creating social sculptures that traverse boundaries between art, architecture, design and technology." Her installations, wearables and sculptures transform the necessities of daily living, such as eating, socializing, sleeping and bathing, "into artful experiments and scenarios for new ways of living.”

== Early life ==
Andrea Zittel was born in Escondido, California, in 1965. She graduated from San Pasqual High School in 1983. Zittel received a Bachelor of Fine Arts in painting and sculpture from San Diego State University in 1988, and an MFA in sculpture from the Rhode Island School of Design in 1990.

== Career ==
=== Work ===
In the early 1990s, Zittel began making art in response to her own surroundings and daily routines, creating functional objects relating to shelter, furniture, and clothing "in an ongoing endeavor to better understand human nature and the social construction of needs." It was then she began working under the name "A-Z Administrative Services," which evolved into the A-Z Enterprise that continues to encompass all aspects of day-to-day living. Home furniture, clothing, food all become the sites of investigation in an ongoing endeavor to better understand human nature. Zittel reconsiders the significance of given social structures, revealing that what may seem fixed and rational is often arbitrary. "What I'm interested in," Zittel said, "is that each person examines his own goals, talents and options, and then based on these begins to invent new models or roles to fulfill his or her needs." From Zittel's 2005 manifesto:

"What makes us feel liberated is not total freedom, but rather living in a set of limitations that we have created and prescribed for ourselves."

In the early 1990s Zittel's Brooklyn studio became a showroom testing ground known as "A-Z East," where she would prototype and live with her experimental designs for living. In 1991 she made the first of her "A-Z Six-Month Personal Uniforms"—garments that she wore every day for six-month periods of time. Like the uniforms, many of Zittel's projects embody and establish a set of strict rules for living; however, she suggests that these systems can instead allow for more freedom and creativity. "What makes us feel liberated is not total freedom, but rather living in a set of limitations that we have created and prescribed for ourselves"

Andrea Zittel, Living Unit

In 1992 Zittel produced the "A-Z Management and Maintenance Unit", her first "Living Unit"— experimental structures intended to reduce everything necessary for living into a simple, compact system—as a means of facilitating basic activities within her 200-square-foot (19 m^{2}) Brooklyn storefront apartment. The unit contains a small dining booth, plastic sink, stovetop, closet, sleeping cot, and stool—fulfilling basic domestic needs of eating, sleeping, cleaning and storage. Though often recalling mass-produced commodities, Zittel's "Living Units" are in actuality highly personal, customized for individual needs. Zittel's works encourage a greater personal and social responsibility in prompting an active re-examination of needs and routines. "Where on the one hand, mass production may cause greater equality by making the same goods available to everyone," Zittel said, "on the other hand it diminishes individuality and identity. What we as consumers must do is to redefine our objects within the context of our own needs."

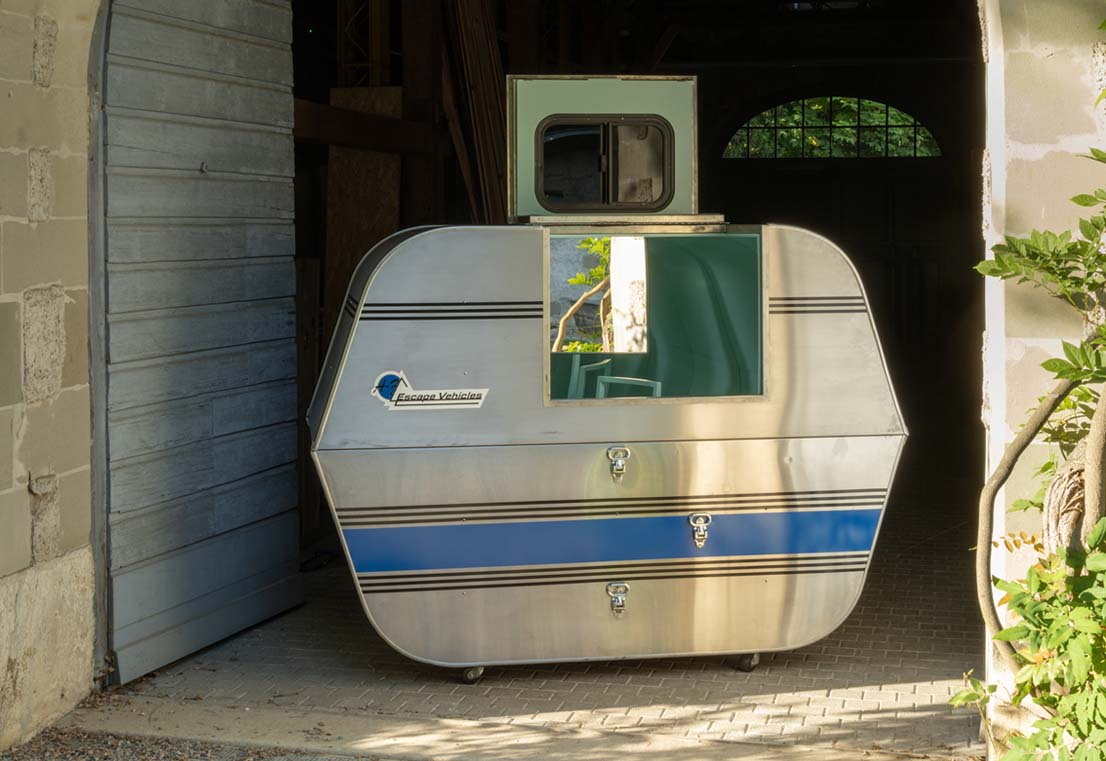
Andrea Zittel, A-Z Escape Vehicle, 1996. as exhibited in 2022 at OPEN HOUSE, Geneva, courtesy Vitra Design Museum.

While some of her modernist-inspired products were designed with the intention of streamlining daily routines, others, such as Zittel's "Escape Vehicles" (1996), appeal to fantasies of isolating oneself from the outside world. In 1998 Zittel developed her "Rules of Raugh" (pronounced raw) along with a new series of living environments and furniture. Compared to earlier goals of simplification and efficiency, the Raugh works, while also multipurpose in nature, embrace an unfinished and low-maintenance aesthetic. "Raugh is a witty and wise addition to Zittel's investigation of the interplay between modernist esthetics, efficiency, and social determinism."

In 2000, Zittel relocated her home and studio from Brooklyn, NY to a parcel of land in the California desert near to Joshua Tree National Park. She purchased five acres (2.0 ha) of desert for $40,000. There she continues to develop her life project, "A-Z West", a testing grounds for her work and ideas, and site whose environment, structure and elements shape an intentional context for experience. The grounds consist of over 50 acres (20 ha), as well as several satellite properties, as site for numerous projects and structures including: Zittel's home/testing grounds, the Wagon Station Encampment, Regenerating Field, shipping container compound, A-Z West studio and weaving studio, the A-Z West guest cabin, a ten-acre parcel (4.0 ha) for High Desert Test Sites projects, and several adjacent parcels slated for future projects.

The original structure of Zittel's home in the Mojave Desert was a homestead cabin, built during the period of the Homestead Act. While developing A-Z West, one of her first projects was the "Homestead Unit" (2001), a portable and compact structure that circumvents the necessity of a building permit due to their small size, recalling the structures mandated by the government with the Homestead Act. Continuing an investigation of limited infrastructures, scattered throughout the A-Z West grounds are twelve "Wagon Stations," portable one-person shelters that accommodate residents each spring and fall. Zittel has referenced the "earthworks" of land artists such as Walter de Maria as inspiration.

Another primary exploration of Zittel's is around the concept of panels, or planes—the basic elements of our surrounding reality. With increasingly abstract and large-scale works––Personal Panel Uniforms (1995-1998), Carpet Furniture, Parallel Planar Panels, Planar Pavilions, Planar Configurations, and Linear Sequences––Zittel questions preconceptions regarding the functional, psychological, and even spiritual meanings of horizontality and verticality.

=== Public commissions ===
In 1999, the Public Art Fund commissioned Andrea Zittel to create a site-specific project for New York's Central Park. "Point of Interest", her first public project, located at the southeast entrance to the park, comprised two giant, faux rocks—constructed from steel armatures covered in concrete—emerging from the ground. The installation served as a reminder that the park is a meticulously planned natural environment, while providing visitors with an alternative to the typical park bench. That same year, Zittel created "A-Z Pocket Property," a 44-ton floating concrete island anchored off the coast of Denmark, which was commissioned by the Danish government. The artist lived on the "fantasy island" for one month as an experiment in escapism and isolation.

In 2010, "Indianapolis Island", an inhabitable floating island at the 100 Acres: The Virginia B. Fairbanks Art and Nature Park at the Indianapolis Museum of Art, further explored Zittel's interest in ideas of independence, privacy, and comfort. "The Island is iconographic for conditions of autonomy, independence, and individualism in our culture," Zittel said. "The desire for individualization is linked inextricably to consumer culture: People consume to individualize themselves and they also consume to combat the resulting feelings of isolation or loneliness."

In 2014, the Denver Federal Center in Lakewood, Colorado commissioned a major permanent outdoor installation of "Planar Pavilions."

=== Collaborations ===
Andrea Zittel is a co-organizer of High Desert Test Sites, a non-profit organization founded by Andrea Zittel, Shaun Caley Regen, Lisa Anne Auerbach, Andy Stillpass, and John Conelly. High Desert Test Sites is a series of experimental art sites located in California desert communities including Pioneertown, Twentynine Palms, Joshua Tree, and Wonder Valley. These sites support intimate and immersive experiences and exchanges between artists, critical thinkers, and general audiences, including immersive excursions, solo projects, publications, workshops, and residencies.

From 2006 to 2010, Zittel co-organized the A-Z smockshop in Los Angeles, "an artist-run enterprise that generated income for artists whose work is either non-commercial, or not yet self-sustaining." Smocks were designed by Andrea Zittel and sewn by artists who reinterpreted the original design.

=== Teaching ===
Andrea Zittel holds an intensive eight-day MFA seminar once a year at A-Z West; the program, known as The Institute for Investigative Living, "focuses on the subject of ‘Life Practice' as the junction of art and life – asking of how one can live a life that is intellectually rigorous and culturally relevant, regardless of the market or other outside factors." Zittel is also a regular visiting critic at Columbia University, in the Master of Fine Arts program.

== Exhibitions ==
Andrea Zittel is represented by Andrea Rosen Gallery in New York, Regen Projects in Los Angeles, Sadie Coles HQ in London, Massimo de Carlo in Milan, and Spruth-Magers in Munich.

Zittel was featured in the Venice Biennale in 1993, Documenta X in Kassel and Skulptur Projekte Münster in 1997, and was included in the 1995 and 2004 Whitney Biennial.

Zittel has had solo exhibitions at Carnegie Museum of Art, Pittsburgh (1994); San Francisco Museum of Modern Art (1995); Louisiana Museum of Modern Art, Denmark (1996); Museum fur Gegenwartskunst, Basel (1996); Deichtorhallen, Hamburg (1999); Whitney Museum of American Art at Altria, NY (2006); Schaulager, Basel (2008); Magasin 3, Stockholm (2011); and Middleheim Museum, Antwerp (2015). Her 1991-2005 career retrospective "Andrea Zittel: Critical Space" was exhibited at: Contemporary Arts Museum Houston (2005), New Museum of Contemporary Art, New York (2006), Albright-Knox Art Gallery, Buffalo (2006), Los Angeles Museum of Contemporary Art (2007), and Vancouver Art Gallery (2007).

== Awards ==
In 1995, Zittel received a DAAD fellowship; in 2005, she received the Smithsonian American Art Museum's Lucelia Artist Award; in 2006 she was awarded the Distinguished Body of Work Award from the College Art Association; in 2007 she received the AICA Award for Best Architecture or Design Show, and 2012 she was awarded the Austrian Frederick Kiesler Prize for Architecture and the Arts. In 2015, Zittel was awarded a Guggenheim Fellowship for Fine Arts.

== Collections ==
Zittel's work is held in the permanent collections of the Solomon R. Guggenheim Museum, the Whitney Museum of American Art, the Metropolitan Museum of Art, among other institutions. The Museum of Modern Art in New York holds 33 of her works in their permanent collection.

== See also ==
- List of artists from Brooklyn
- A-Z West
