= David Thomas Broughton =

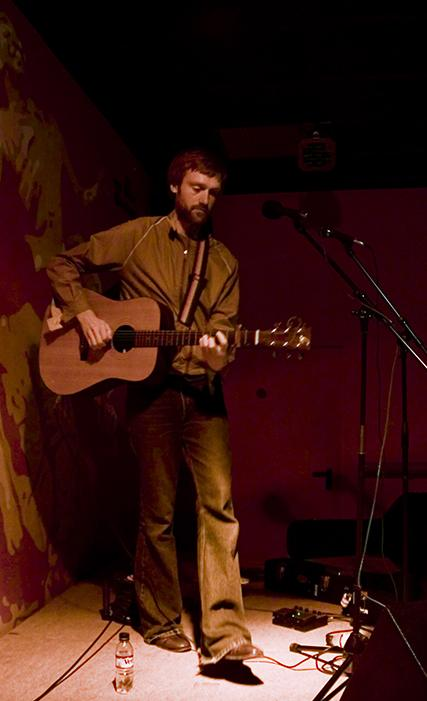
- Broughton performing in March 2008

Background information
- Born: 20 March 1981 (age 44)
- Origin: Otley, West Yorkshire, England
- Genres: Folk, avant-garde
- Instrument(s): Vocals, acoustic guitar, looper
- Years active: 2004–present
- Labels: Birdwar; Plug Research; Golden Lab; Acuarela; Paper Garden; Song, By Toad
- Website: DavidThomasBroughton.co.uk

David Thomas Broughton (/ˈbrɔːtən/, born 20 March 1981) is an English folk/avant-garde singer and guitarist. Born in Otley, West Yorkshire, he creates the sound of a large ensemble by sampling himself singing, playing acoustic guitar, and making an assortment of other sounds through a Boss loop pedal. He also uses various non-traditional musical instruments to augment his songs, including radios, personal attack alarms and televisions, and occasionally incorporates a use of natural field recordings into his music. He is also known for his love of spontaneity and musical improvisation, recording albums in one take (allowing recording faults to remain) and beginning live performances with no clear plan in mind. He includes self-conscious, ironic dance moves and off-mic (often off-stage) singing in his live performances.

Four solo albums have been released under his own name, The Complete Guide to Insufficiency (2005), It's in There Somewhere (2007), the studio recorded album Outbreeding (2010) and triple LP Crippling Lack (2016), as well as the EPs Anchovies (2007) and Boating Disasters (2010). In 2007 he collaborated with Leeds chamber music group 7 Hertz to release David Thomas Broughton vs. 7 Hertz, and released a single during the same year with Chris Casati. In 2013 he collaborated with the Juice Vocal Ensemble and the subsequent year Sliding the Same Way (David Thomas Broughton and Juice Vocal Ensemble) (2014) was released. Most of his releases have been met with great critical acclaim, with publications such as Pitchfork Media and Tiny Mix Tapes rating his work highly.

Broughton has toured around the world, including appearances at Barcelona's Primavera Sound and Britain's Green Man and End of the Road Festival festivals.

Broughton is the subject of Greg Butler's documentary The Ambiguity of David Thomas Broughton, which premiered at 29th Leeds International Film Festival on 11 November 2015.

== Biography ==
Although he was bought a guitar by his father, Broughton was never formally trained to play any instrument. Broughton's debut album, The Complete Guide to Insufficiency, was released in 2005. Recorded in a Leeds church by suggestion of the label, it contains five relatively long compositions that combine previously existing songs and improvisation. This album was followed by a decidedly low fidelity release, 2006's three track EP Anchovies, and then 2007's It's in There Somewhere, a collection of home recordings from the previous six years. 2007 also saw the release of a single with Chris Casati, featuring the songs "The Rage" and "Be My Boy".

His first full-length collaborative work, with Leeds-based chamber music group 7 Hertz, entitled David Thomas Broughton vs. 7 Hertz, was released in October 2007. The album 5 Curses was supposed to be released in April 2008 by Golden Lab, but it has now been delayed indefinitely. The album Outbreeding, was released in 2010 on Brainlove Records. Also in 2010 he released Boating Disasters, a four track EP containing, among others, newer versions of the songs "Perfect Louse" and "Ain't Got No Sole" from It's in There Somewhere.

Broughton's 2016 release, Crippling Lack, was recorded in France and via email exchange while he was living in Pyongyang, and features contributions from artists such as Aidan Moffat, Beth Orton, Jordan Geiger, Sam Amidon, Luke Drozd, Rachael Dadd and ICHI. The basic tracks were recorded in at Le Noize Maker Studios in France, and after Broughton returned to Korea, French players Timothee Couteau, Olivier Minne and Bastien Loufrani were brought in to add parts, which were approved or adjusted under instruction by Broughton after receiving mixes by email. He then asked friends to contribute vocals or instrumental parts, recording them on his iPad when he visited them, or receiving their submissions by email.

Broughton remains a part-time musician, having worked as a conservation officer, a data analyst for an electric company and in customer services for Transport for London. He has lived in Pyongyang and in Seoul through his partner's work and since 2020 lives in Tokyo.

== Style and songwriting ==
Both Broughton's recorded and live music is based heavily on spontaneity and improvisation. However, he often has a basic melody or lyric in mind beforehand, building the layers into a full composition that can be dismantled whenever he sees fit; in his own words, this process allows the music to be more organic. Similarly, the length of compositions are dependent on feelings at the time, allowing the loops of the previous song to gradually fade out and bleed into the next song when nothing else is deemed worthy of addition. Aside from his usual combination of an acoustic guitar and loop pedals, field recordings are often used; Broughton puts their usage simply down to his love of nature and the environment.

Broughton's voice, although distinctive, has been compared with singers such as Anohni Hegarty of Anohni and the Johnsons and Devendra Banhart. Broughton, however, insists he had never heard their music before the comparisons were made, seeing the similarities as being the likely result of people growing up with the same records. His lyrics often deal with serious, universal topics such as romance and death, though mirrored with more everyday references; one clear example can be heard on "Weight of My Love" from David Thomas Broughton vs. 7 Hertz, which mentions his inability to afford a pasty from Greggs bakery.

== Discography ==
=== LPs ===
- The Complete Guide to Insufficiency – 2005 CD (Birdwar/Plug Research), 2019 vinyl LP (Song, By Toad)
- It's in There Somewhere – 2007 CD/LP (Birdwar)
- David Thomas Broughton vs. 7 Hertz – 2007 CD (Acuarela), collaborative work with 7 Hertz
- Outbreeding – 2011 CD/LP (Brainlove Records)
- UnAbleTo – 2013 Cassette (Antiquated Future Records)
- 5 Curses – 2014 Download (self-released), originally scheduled for 2007 on Golden Lab Records
- Sliding the Same Way (David Thomas Broughton and Juice Vocal Ensemble) – 2015 CD/LP (Song, By Toad), collaborative work with Juice Vocal Ensemble
- Crippling Lack – 2016 Triple 12" LP, 2017 re-press (Song, By Toad/Paper Garden Records/Le Noize Maker Records)
- Live at The Rose Hill - 2020 CD, recording of a 2017 live performance in Brighton

=== Singles and EPs ===
- Anchovies – 2006 10" EP (Golden Lab Records)
- Boating Disasters – 2010 EP (Static Caravan Records)

=== Other ===
- The Rage/Be My Boy (Broughton & Casati) – 2007 Download (Plug Research), collaboration with Chris Casati
