= How to Destroy the Universe =

Music festival in California, United States

How To Destroy the Universe
- Genre: Experimental noise, industrial sounds, and avant-garde visual art
- Location: Berkeley, California
- Years active: 2002 – present
- Founders: Mobilization.com
- Website: festival website

The How To Destroy the Universe festival is a California music event that presents experimental noise, industrial sounds, and avant-garde visual art. Founded in 2002 by Berkeley, California residents Ethan Port and Scot Jenerik and the San Francisco–based experimental music label Mobilization Records, the festival aimed to expand the parameters of what is termed "art" and "culture." The bands who played during the event focused on "exploding conventions around song structure, melody and rhythm and then reassembling the parts." The 2002–2005 tours included fire-art, multimedia performances and throat singing. Bands who played in 2006 include Blixa Bargeld of Einstürzende Neubauten, the Living Jarboe of the Swans, F-Space, and Sixteens. In 2010, a four-day How to Destroy the Universe festival took place in the San Francisco Bay Area to celebrate what turned out to be the final Throbbing Gristle performances in the United States.

Although occasional, the festival series is still active.

== See also ==
- List of experimental music festivals
- Live electronic music
