= David Thomas Broughton vs. 7 Hertz =

Studio album by David Thomas Broughton and 7 Hertz
- Released: October 2007
- Label: Acuarela

Professional ratings
Review scores
| Source | Rating |
|---|---|
| Cokemachineglow | (77%) |

David Thomas Broughton vs. 7 Hertz is a collaborative album between David Thomas Broughton and Leeds-based ensemble 7 Hertz. The music was all improvised and recorded in a single take in a church in Leeds. The record was released in 2007 by Acuarela Discos.

== Track listing ==
1. "Weight of My Love"
2. "No Great Shakes"
3. "Jolly (Interlude)"
4. "Fisted Hand"
5. "River Outlet"
