= Crippling Lack =

Studio album by David Thomas Broughton
- Released: 2016
- Studio: Song, by Toad (UK); Le Noize Maker (FR); Paper Garden (US)
- Genre: Alternative folk
- Length: 1:41:04

Crippling Lack is a 2016 album by British folk singer and guitarist David Thomas Broughton. The album was released in three volumes with three labels in three countries, those being Edinburgh's Song, by Toad Records (Vol.1), Lens’ Le Noize Maker (Vol.2), and New York City's Paper Garden (Vol.3). Much like the rest of his albums, most of the songs on the album were recorded in one take. Additional parts were recorded later while he was living in Seoul, with collaborating artists sending parts and mixes by email.

Prog noted about the project, "David Thomas Broughton’s trilogy Crippling Lack (Song By Toad, among other labels) is afforded new focus by the English enigma’s current, extensive UK tour, which stretches into mid-December at folk clubs up and down the land."

== Track listing ==
No.	Title	Length
1.	"Crippling Lack, Pt. 1"	4:05
2.	"Beast"	5:49
3.	"Words of Art" (featuring Aidan Moffat)	7:19
4.	"Silent Arrow"	9:19
5.	"Dots"	9:22
6.	"River" (featuring Sam Amidon)	3:52
7.	"Concrete Statement"	13:34
8.	"I Close My Eyes"	16:17
9.	"Crippling Lack, Pt. 2"	9:35
10.	"Gulf" (featuring Jordan Geiger)	5:39
11.	"Beast Without You" (featuring Beth Orton)	6:34
12.	"Plunge of the Dagger" (featuring Luke Drozd)	9:32
