= Gay against you =

Electronic music duo from Glasgow, Scotland

gay against you
- Origin: Glasgow, Scotland
- Genres: electronic, experimental, pop
- Years active: 2005–2009
- Labels: Adaadat; Upset The Rhythm
- Past members: Joe Howe; Lachlann Rattray

Gay Against You (stylized as gay against you or GVsY) were an electronic music duo from Glasgow, Scotland, made up of high school friends Joseph Howe (a.k.a. Oats Soda) and Lachlann Rattray (a.k.a. Mr. Big Softie).

== Biography ==
The band formed in 2005 after Howe and Rattray moved into a shared flat, having previously played together in various other bands. They self-released a mini-album, also named gay against you, in 2005. It became one of the most frequently downloaded records from the last.fm website. The following year their debut full-length album, Muscle Milk, was released by the Adaadat label.

The popularity of the band's first record on last.fm led to the group being asked to perform live at the Old Blue Last venue in Shoreditch for a last.fm/Presents event, which was recorded and released as a free downloadable album on the site. Their second full-length album, Righteous Signals, Sour Dudes, was released on CD in 2009 by Adaadat, with a vinyl version released by the Upset the Rhythm! label.

gay against you toured the United Kingdom several times, also touring Scandinavia and elsewhere in Europe. They played gigs with the likes of Lightning Bolt, Dan Deacon, Shitdisco, No Age, Cutting Pink With Knives, The Blow and Eats Tapes. They recorded radio sessions for Tom Ravenscroft's Channel 4 Radio show and for Vic Galloway's "BBC Introducing in Scotland" show on BBC Radio 1. They were also played by Radio 1's Rob da Bank and Steve Lamacq, and on Resonance FM.

A rumour spread in the Norwegian press that the NME had called gay against you "the new shit", leading to reporters unexpectedly attending their Norwegian shows requesting interviews; no-one knows where this rumour originated.

The band broke up in 2009 following the release of Righteous Signals, Sour Dudes. They issued a further EP posthumously, I Play Gay, consisting of covers of the band's songs by Dananananaykroyd, Dolby Anol, Agaskodo Teliverek and House Mouse.

Both members continued to perform separately and released solo records. Howe used the name Germlin for his solo work and has more recently performed and released skweee-influenced music as Ben Butler and Mousepad, sometimes accompanied by drummer Bastian Hagedorn. Rattray has also performed and released as Yoko, Oh No!, as well as playing in the band Neighbourhood Gout.

== Style ==
The band gained attention for their flamboyant and chaotic live shows (often played with Howe and Rattray dressed in PE kits and on the venue's dancefloor rather than the stage), prominent visual style, offbeat subject matter (with songs about unicorns, lactose intolerance, Lawrence of Arabia, breakfast cereal, Magic Eye puzzles, Jurassic Park and physicist Niels Bohr) and their diverse and experimental musical style. Their early work was noted as combining accessible pop melodies with unconventional, rapidly changing song structures and disorientating bursts of synthesizer or electric guitar. Later material was described as "slightly more... mature", with lush analogue-sounding synth and even psychedelic influences.

Stated influences included Magma, Minutemen, Devo, Cardiacs and BBC Radio 4. The band garnered comparisons to artists such as The Locust, Melt-Banana, Animal Collective, The Faint, Nintendo soundtrack music, Clap Your Hands Say Yeah, Atari Teenage Riot, The Mae Shi, Lightning Bolt and The Pastels. They were described by Terrorizer magazine as "[e]ither a council estate Butthole Surfers or just Japanese mimicry... odd and wrong", and by Drowned in Sound as "a chiptune-gabba aerobics class soundtrack". The Wire called them "prog, of a sort... though with manic impatience in place of pomposity", while Fused Magazine described them as "[t]wo subterranean creatures dressed in primary school P.E. kits, complete with charcoal-stained eyes and badly-concealed erections, howl[ing] unintelligibly over spaz-core electronics". The Daily Telegraph said they were "absurdly-named".

In an interview with Dazed & Confused magazine, the band characterised their own music as "filter pop", and "pop music with all the shit bits taken out: mostly no repetition, no wastage, and no fat".

== Personnel ==
- Joe Howe – vocals, programming, synthesizer
- Lachlann Rattray – vocals, MIDI, electric guitar

== Discography ==
=== Albums ===
- gay against you (self-released/Megapixxels, 2005)
- Muscle Milk (Adaadat, 2006)
- Live at last.fm/Presents (last.fm, 2007)
- Righteous Signals, Sour Dudes (ADAADAT/Upset the Rhythm!, 2009)

=== EPs ===
- Bogus Totem Summer (CD + DVD, self-released, 2006)
- gay against you/House Mouse Summer Tour Split (self-released, 2007)
- I Play Gay (self-released, 2009)

=== Singles ===
- The Vichy Government/Gay Against You split 7-inch (Filthy Little Angels, 2007)
- O.I.B Records Split Series Volume 1 7-inch (One Inch Badge, 2007)

=== Compilation appearances ===
- "Greased Lightning" on Down to Grease on Holiday (Filthy Little Angels, 2006)
- "Fun Meal, Satabic" on Exercise for Exorcisms, vol. 1 (Unnecessary Friction, 2006)
- "Magic Eye" on Two Thousand and Ace (Brainlove, 2008)
- "Let's Build a Chinatown pt. II" on Stench of Muscle (Stench of Muscle, 2008)
