= It's in There Somewhere =

It's In There Somewhere

Compilation album by David Thomas Broughton
- Released: 2007
- Genre: Folk
- Length: 56:40
- Label: Birdwar

It's In There Somewhere is an album by David Thomas Broughton, released in 2007, collating a number of unreleased songs recorded during the previous six years.

== Track listing ==
1. "Circle is Never Complete" – 4:05
2. "Negativity" – 0:32
3. "Gracefully Silent" – 8:33
4. "Interlude 1" - 1:52
5. "I Don't Want to Believe You" - 3:23
6. "The Heart You Don't Look Out For" - 0:39
7. "Ain't Got No Sole" - 5:45
8. "Why Are You Not Here" - 3:45
9. "Nature" - 6:51
10. "One Day" - 9:35
11. "Interlude 2" - 0:30
12. "So Much Sin to Forgive" - 4:58
13. "Look What I Have Done" - 6:12

All songs by David Thomas Broughton
