= Adaadat =

- Founded: 2002
- Founder: Angus Keith, Bjorn Hatleskog
- Distributor: Cargo Records
- Genre: Experimental, breakcore, chiptune, noise, IDM, experimental rock, art rock
- Country of origin: United Kingdom
- Location: London, England
- Official website: http://www.adaadat.co.uk

Adaadat is a British Independent record label based in London releasing an eclectic mixture of Experimental Music, Chiptune, Noise Music, Art Rock, IDM and Breakcore. It was founded in 2002 by Angus Keith and Bjorn Hatleskog. The record label was initially set-up to release music by hard to find Japanese artists in the UK. Adaadat went on to develop a reputation for "anarchic spliced noise and frenetic live shows". In 2005 the Adaadat label was showcased on BBC One World programme broadcast on BBC Radio 1. From 2005 to 2006 Adaadat ran a monthly club night at the ICA called Trash Trash Noise Next Door.

== Artists ==
- 65daysofstatic
- Agaskodo Teliverek
- Atom Truck
- Bruno & Michel Are Smiling + Skipperr
- CDR
- Cow'p
- DDamage
- Duracell
- DJ 100000000
- DJ Scotch Egg
- DJ Top Gear
- Doddodo
- Drop the Lime
- Gay Against You
- Germlin
- Greypetcat
- Gum Takes Tooth
- Horatio Pollard
- Hrvatski
- Jason Forrest
- Ove-Naxx
- Lasse Marhaug
- Mathhead
- Milky Chu
- Ommm
- Reverbaphon
- Romvelope
- S. Isabella
- Shex
- Silverlink
- Strange Attractor vs. Disinformation
- Superdefekt
- The Doubtful Guest
- Utabi
- Venta Protesix
- Yaporigami
