= MUTEK =

- Genre: Electronic music, experimental music
- Locations: Montreal, international
- Years active: 2000–present
- Website: mutek.org

MUTEK is a Montreal-based festival dedicated to the promotion of electronic music and the digital arts. Its central platform is an annual six-day event in Montreal that takes place in late August. Alongside the Montreal edition, MUTEK also hosts international versions of its festival.

== History ==
Mutek was founded in 2000 by Alain Mongeau.

A Mexican edition of MUTEK has taken place in Mexico City since 2003. Annual South American single and/or multi-day events have taken place in Argentina and Chile since 2002 and 2004 respectively. The 2004 Chilean version of the event was produced locally by Pol Taylor and Rocio Venegas with the collaboration of the Canadian team, and was called ¨Synthetic City¨. The event took place in Muelle Barón, in the port city of Valparaíso. Showcases have occurred in Brazil and Colombia as well.

In 2005 MUTEK was among the first Western cultural organizations to send a delegation of electronic artists to China.

In 2014, MUTEK paired with digital arts festival Elektra for the EM15 festival in Montreal.

== See also ==
- List of electronic music festivals
- List of experimental music festivals
