= The Complete Guide to Insufficiency =

Studio album by David Thomas Broughton
- Released: 2005
- Genre: Folk
- Length: 39:06
- Label: Birdwar (UK); Plug Research (US)

Professional ratings
Review scores
Source	Rating
Cokemachineglow	84%
Drowned in Sound	8/10
Pitchfork Media	8.4/10
Sputnikmusic	4.5/5

The Complete Guide to Insufficiency is the debut album by David Thomas Broughton, released in 2005. The entire album was recorded in a single continuous take at a church in Leeds - the church bells can be heard during the record. It was originally released by small indie label Birdwar in the UK before being licensed by Plug Research for US release. The title is a play on the name of John Seymour's book The Complete Guide to Self-Sufficiency.

== Track listing ==
All songs by David Thomas Broughton.

No.	Title	Length
1.	"Ambiguity"	6:35
2.	"Execution"	8:21
3.	"Unmarked Grace"	8:46
4.	"Walking Over You"	6:17
5.	"Ever Rotating Sky"	9:07
Total length:		39:06
