= Anchovies (EP) =

EP by David Thomas Broughton
- Released: 2005
- Genre: Folk
- Length: 17:42

Anchovies is a 3-track EP by English folk musician David Thomas Broughton.

== Track listing ==
1. "Anchovies" – 9:22
2. "The Window" – 3:17
3. "Liberazione" – 5:03
