= Romvelope =

- Also known as: Kema Keur
- Born: Bjorn Hatleskog
- Origin: Edinburgh, Scotland
- Genres: Electronic music, experimental, noise music
- Years active: 2000–present
- Label: Adaadat
- Website: www.adaadat.co.uk/romvelope/

Romvelope (Bjorn Hatleskog) is a Scots-Norwegian experimental musician and sound artist based in London. His work explores the nature of feedback loops and, noise and interference. Romvelope's music has been released on several independent record labels including Adaadat, Seed Records, Benbecula Records, Invitro and Rolax Records. His music was also featured on The Wire Magazine's Wire Tapper CD compilation series. Hatleskog's sound sculptures have been exhibited at the De La Warr Pavilion, and the Kinetica Artfair.
