= OM Festival =

Canadian electronic music festival

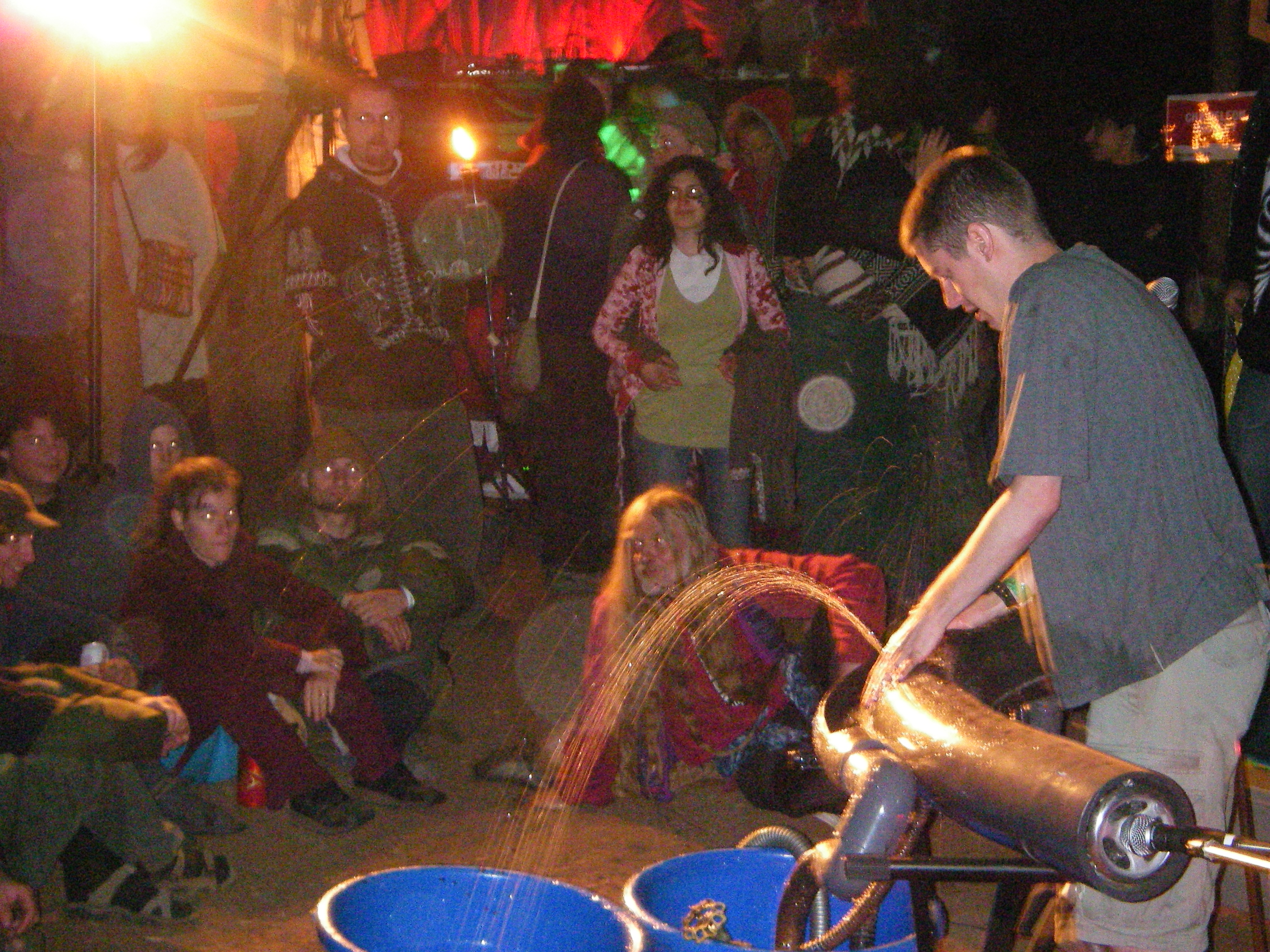
- One of the concerts/performances at the OM Festival Reunion, June 2007
- Genre: Electronic dance music, experimental music
- Dates: summer solstice
- Location: Ontario
- Years active: 1998–2004
- Attendance: 3000
- Website: OmReunionProject.org (ORP)

The OM Festival was a community-based summer solstice festival that ran annually in southern Ontario from 1998 to 2004. The festival, organized by Sumkidz (now Suma), primarily featured electronic music as well as dance, workshops, art, and other forms of acoustic music. It encouraged its attendees to participate by volunteering and promoted free expression and a no-spectator, leave-no-trace philosophy. At its peak, Om drew in just over 3000 participants from all over the world.

== History ==
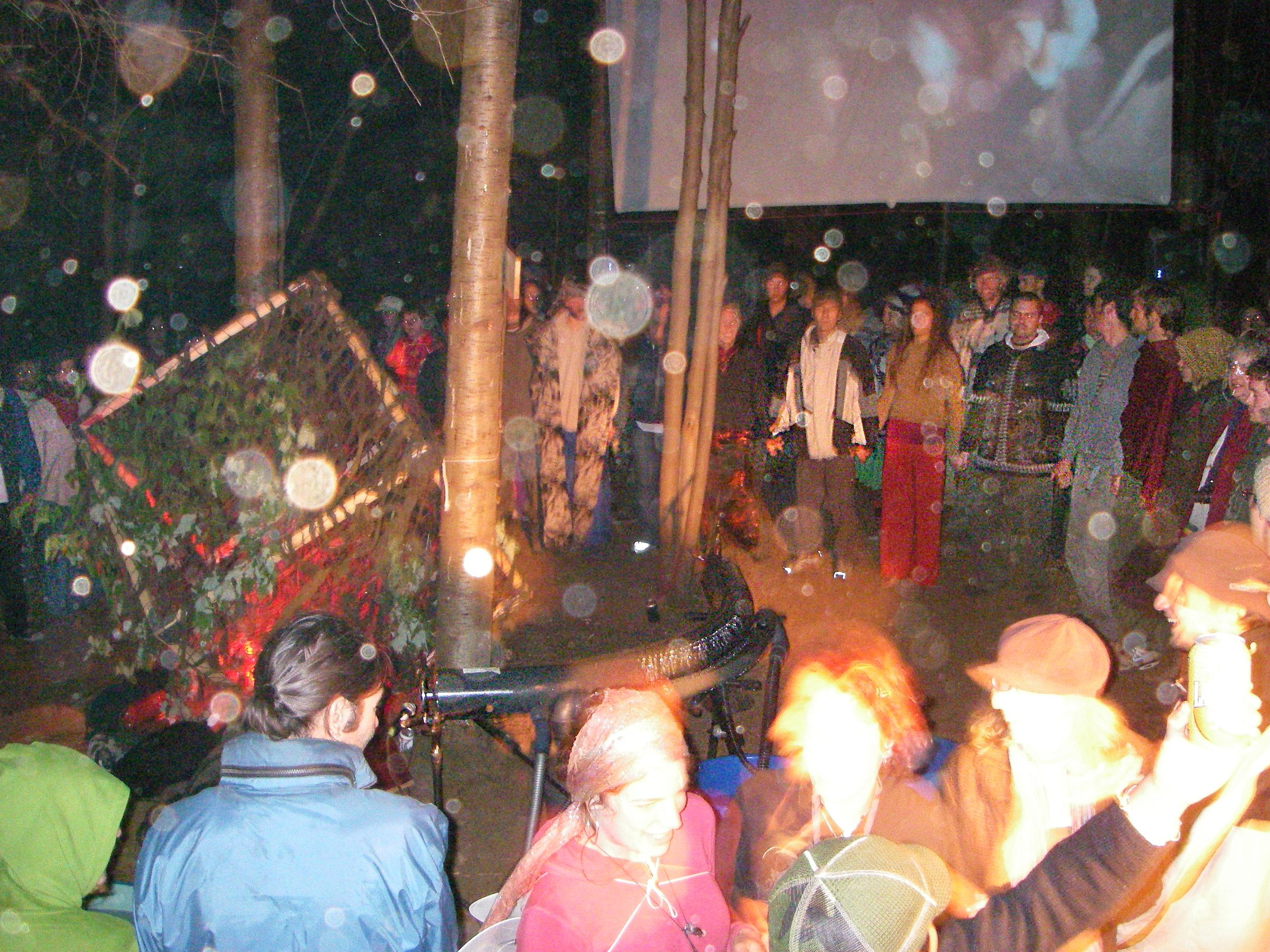
OM Circle at the Reunion 2007. Visible also are data projection screen in background and hydraulophone in center of OM Circle.

The event had multiple stages, a free community kitchen which produced thousands of meals throughout the weekend, a healing area, and an educational hub where people shared ideas and offered hundreds of workshops on everything from knitting to independent media.

The annual gathering attracted people who enjoyed electronic music, considered themselves knowledge-seekers, environmentalists, spiritual travelers, and other individuals who sought the enlightenment of the human spirit. The festival also supported many musicians (primarily electronic) and artists from across Canada and internationally, as well as a wide range of collectives. It offered them the opportunity and funds to produce and showcase their work and skills to a large and diverse audience.

Ideals espoused by the core group of festival organizers and participants were togetherness, freedom, volunteering, and spiritual tolerance and exploration.

Former festival attendees and Message Board members sometimes called themselves 'Omies'.

The final Om Festival occurred in 2004. It ended as a result of many factors. Provincial politics and false media surrounding the booming electronic music scene at the time made it increasingly difficult to produce outdoor gatherings of that magnitude. An unsustainable, volunteer-based organizational structure that required many coordinators to work, unpaid, on a nearly full-time basis for months at a time was another significant factor.

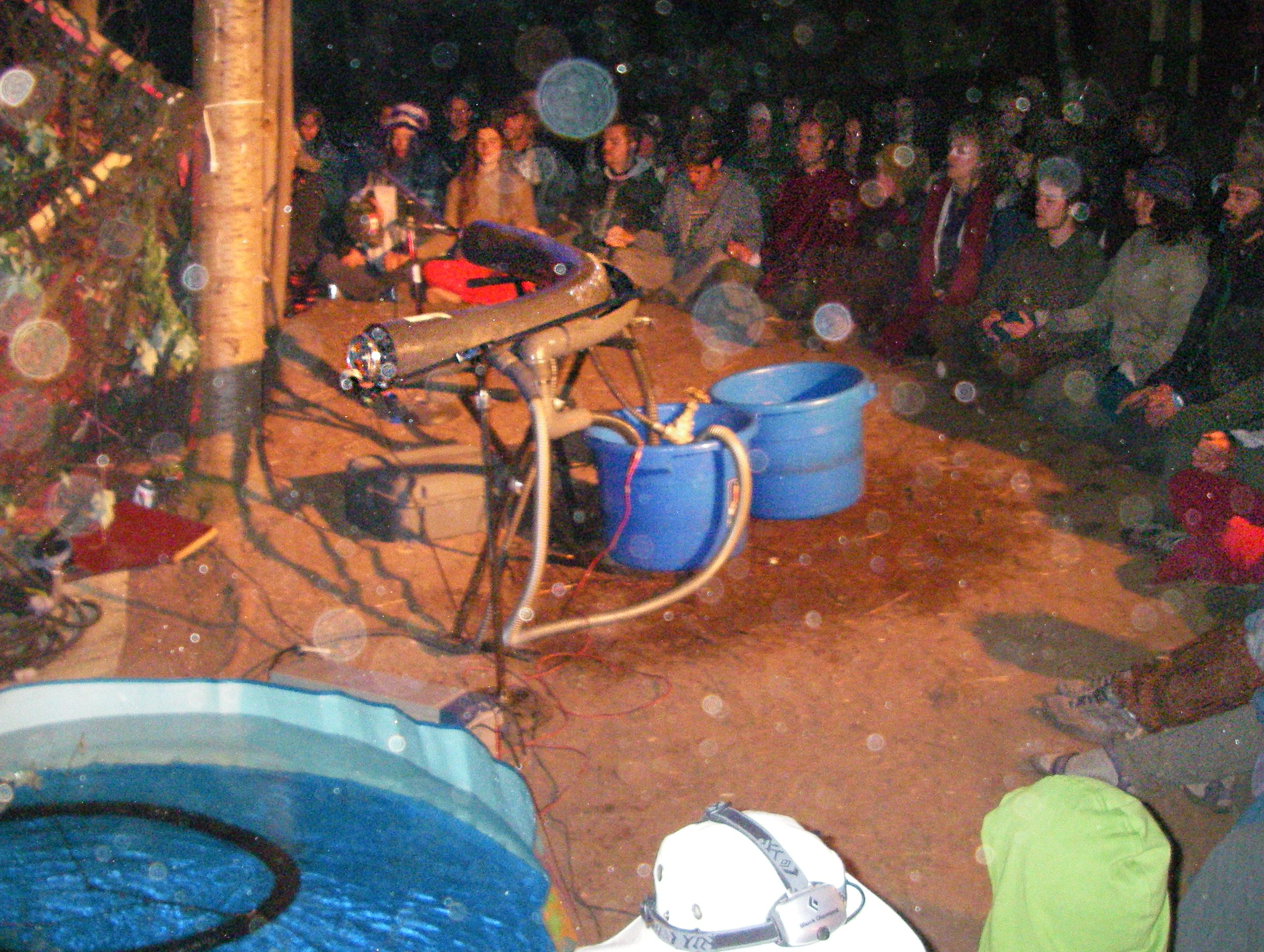
OM Circle at the Reunion 2007

The festival was organized and maintained by Sumkidz (now known as "Suma"), a collective of artists and activists living in and around Toronto, Ontario.

== Community ==
The organizers of the festival, aside from volunteering themselves, relied on hundreds of additional volunteers to make everything happen. Volunteers would attend meetings in Toronto several weeks prior to the festivities where roles would be assigned, thus cultivating deeper and more meaningful relationships and community connections.

Volunteers chose to work in the Kind Kitchen, on foot patrol (security and first aid), in the childcare areas, on cleanup, or in several other positions. Those who gave their time and effort to sustain the festival received a reduced ticket price, although they did not pay for their T-shirt identifying them as OM crew.

== Om Reunion Project ==
After the final Om Festival in 2004, several members of Sumkidz, along with many individuals from the larger Om Community, formed the OM Reunion Project (ORP) and began to organize a more intimate and less structured summer solstice gathering. The first such gathering was held in 2005 (called "Re:union"), followed by "In:tent" in 2006, "Re:treat" in 2007, "In:sight" in 2008, "Re:Leaf" in 2009, "In:fuse" in 2010, and "Re:Generate" in 2011 and, as of 2013, is simply called "Solstice". The festival runs for one week, Monday through Monday, on the week which includes the summer solstice. The Om Reunion Project is an intentional community event and goes beyond a "party". All participants must register for the gathering in advance and are responsible for making the gathering happen. Every attendee is required to volunteer, and everyone is encouraged to share their skills, whether it be music, dance, art, food, education or anything else. While, on many levels, ORP has created a differently focused community, it has also pushed away former Om attendees and participants that do not place the same importance on these grass-roots values. Regardless, ORP has encouraged new participants and community willing to pour their creative and intentional energies into the new gathering. ORP continued to grow and evolve each summer solstice in the spirit of the former Om Festival and provides an inspiring and educational retreat for many 'Omies' old and new. The last Solstice Gathering took place in 2018. Since the COVID pandemic, the Solstice Collective has put the project on hiatus.

== See also ==
- List of electronic music festivals
- Psychedelic trance
- List of experimental music festivals
- Sumkidz
