= 7 Hertz =

- Origin: Leeds, England
- Genres: Chamber music
- Labels: Birdwar
- Website: www.myspace.com/the7hertzband

7 Hertz are a chamber music group based in Leeds, England. As well as releasing the album Tender Almost Vulgar in 2007, they have collaborated with fellow Yorkshire musician David Thomas Broughton to release David Thomas Broughton vs. 7 Hertz. They cite Erik Satie and Eric Dolphy among their influences.
