= Brainlove Records =

British independent record label

- Founded: 2003
- Founder: John Rogers
- Defunct: 2013
- Distributor: Cargo Records / State 51
- Genre: Indie pop Folktronica; Electronica; Experimental Music
- Country of origin: United Kingdom
- Location: London, England
- Official website: https://brainloverecords.greedbag.com

Brainlove Records was a British independent record label with a DIY ethic, based in London, England. The label released experimental indie, pop and electronic music.

Brainlove Records received positive press from media sources such as NME ("relentlessly brilliant"), BBC Radio 1 and BBC 6 Music. Brainlove also ran live shows, including showcases at SPOT Festival in Denmark and Iceland Airwaves in Reykjavík, as well as club nights with White Heat, Club NME at Koko and La Route Du Rock, and a two-day label music festival, held annually at the Brixton Windmill.

The label published an article on its early history in The Quietus in August 2010.

== Roster of artists ==
=== Albums & EP Releases ===
Applicants
Bastardgeist
Bishi
Bleeding Heart Narrative
David Thomas Broughton
The Evenings
Formula Bone
Keyboard Choir
Kippi Kaninus
Mat Riviere
Napoleon IIIrd
The Open Mouths
Pagan Wanderer Lu/Andrew Paul Regan
The Pale Horse
Sacred Harp
Stairs To Korea
We Aeronauts

=== Compilation, Single and 7" Club Releases ===
The $hit, A Scholar & A Physician, Ace Bushy Striptease, Anat Ben David (of Chicks on Speed), Bearsuit, The Blitters, Capitol K, Cats in Paris, Copter, Curly Hair, End of Level Boss, Ex-Rental, Fidel Villeneuve, Fosca, Friends of the Bride, gay against you, Internet Forever, Junkplanet, Kid Carpet, Micronormous, Misty's Big Adventure, Modernaire, Nervoustestpilot, Penny Broadhurst, Planningtorock, Pram, Retro Spankees, Shimura Curves, Slag Rabbit, Sparky Deathcap, The Telescopes, Tim Ten Yen, Trash Fashion, Vicki Churchill, What The Moon Is Like.

== See also ==
- List of record labels
