= Noisefest =

Music festival in Ljubljana, Slovenia

Noise Festival
- Genre: Experimental music, noise music
- Locations: Ljubljana, Slovenia
- Years active: 2001-present

Noise Festival (also known as Noisefest or Nojzfest) is an annual two day experimental noise music festival that takes place in Ljubljana, Slovenia. The festival began in the year 2001 and is organized by Društvo za Razvoj Mladinske Kulture (DRMK), a Collective for the Development of Youth Culture.

Over the years, artists from many different countries have participated in the festival. Noise Festival is the longest-running annual event of its kind, and the only one in this part of the world that is rapidly developing a cult following. The two-day event is held in or around April. In 2003, the festival lasted three days instead of two.

The countries that have been represented by artist's are: Australia, Basque Country, Bosnia, Bulgaria, Canada, Cambodia, Croatia, Czech Republic, France, Germany, Greece, Hungary, Ireland, Italy, Japan, Netherlands, Russia, Serbia, Slovakia, Slovenia, Spain, Sweden, Switzerland, Turkey, Iran and US

== History ==
The festival has taken place annually since 2001 in Metelkova, in the center of Ljubljana. Apart from a wide range of music performances, it has also featured video screenings, lectures, workshops, photography exhibitions, DJ sets, and a CD/Vinyl Record/Cassette market.

=== 2001 ===
April 13–14, Klub Gromka

- Minimal Bastard (Shitenia)
- Hermit (Canada), Ovo (Italy)
- Koji Asano (Japan)
- Inu Yaroh (Japan)
- Praying for Oblivion (USA)
- Sist en 343 (Ljubljana / Slovenia)
- Kozmik Rajders (Ljubljana / Slovenia)
- Karmakumulator (Croatia)
- Hruki & Kunstl (Ljubljana / Slovenia)

=== 2002 ===
April 12–13, Klub Gromka

- Deca Debilane (Ljubljana / Slovenia)
- Pero-Fotar (Bevke / Slovenia)
- Paradox X (Brezovica / Slovenia)
- Marko Ciciliani (Croatia), (r) (Italy)
- Sikhara (USA), USAISAMONSTER (USA)
- Karmakumulator (Croatia)
- Dog Eat Hot Dog (Brežice / Slovenia)
- Marko Cicliani & Jerko Valdevit (Croatia)
- Slovenian Noise Combo (Slovenia)

=== 2003 ===
April 10–12, Klub Gromka

- Andreas Hagberg (Sweden)
- Kunstwerk Gegen Kunstsein "Fleischkrawal Projekt" (ljubljana / Slovenia)
- Shitoba (Slovakia), 7 That Spells (Croatia
- Küpper Busch Junior (Domžale / Slovenia)
- Ffliperr (Brežice / Slovenia)
- Đuro Iz Druge Galaksije (Brežice / Slovenia)
- Ned (Francija), Äquatorkälte (Germany)
- G.Las (Germany)
- Discothèque Grönland (Germany)
- Niemand (Germany)

=== 2004 ===
April 9–10, Klub Gromka

- Đuro Iz Druge Galaksije (Brežice / Slovenia)
- Ventolin Orchestra (Italy)
- Urbsounds feat. RBNX (Slovakia)
- Jamka (Slovakia)
- Urbanfailure (Slovakia)
- Justice Yeldham and the Dynamic Ribbon Device (Australia)
- Lain (Domžale / Slovenia)
- Kawasaki Motoguzzi (USA)
- Gen 26 (Ljubljana / Slovenia)
- Suši Pank (Domžale / Slovenia)
- Ovo (Italy)
- Par Nobile Fratrum (Brežice / Slovenia)
- Man Manly (USA)
- Shitoba (Slovakia)
- Amper-O-Mat (Celje / Slovenia)
- W.K.L. (Germany)

=== 2005 ===
April 12–13, Klub Gromka

- Zurichagainstzurich (Italy)
- Tiws/Reca (Netherlands)
- Nautical Almanac (USA)
- Sikhara (USA)
- Shitoba (Slovakia)
- Democrisy (USA)
- Matthew Ostrowski & George Cremaschi (USA)
- Amper-O-Mat (Celje / Slovenia)
- Ventolin Orchestra (Italy)
- Mondo Cane (Italy)

=== 2006 ===
April 14, Klub Šot 24,5

- A.U.B. (Ljubljana / Slovenia)
- Dave Phillips (Switzerland)
- Guignol Dangereux (Italy)
- Jean Philippe Gross (France)

=== 2007 ===
April 13–14, Menza Pri Koritu

- Massaccesi (USA)
- Odrz (Italy)
- Noise.Wall (Croatia)
- Pamba (Serbia)
- Mattin (Basque Country)
- Suši Pank (Domžale / Slovenia)
- Eric Boros (Canada)
- Cities in Desolation (Greece)
- Rinus van Alebeek (Netherlands)
- Aanalog Suicide (Turkey)

=== 2008 ===
April 11–12, Menza Pri Koritu

- Goosli Noise (Russia)
- Gokkun (Bulgaria)
- Milf Wolf (Netherlands)
- Jesus is Angry and Your Local God: Choking Bishops (Greece)
- Aluviana (Ljubljana / Slovenia)
- Cock Cobra (Netherlands)
- Broken Sleep (Canada)
- Gingagaruga (Italy)
- Franz Fjodor (Netherlands)
- Supraphon Family (Slovakia)
- Squirt (Brežice / Slovenia)

=== 2009 ===
April 3–4, Menza Pri Koritu

- Bipolar Joe (Ireland)
- Smetnja (Croatia)
- Company Fuck (Australia)
- Jesus is Angry (Greece)
- DJ Digital Ramone (Koper / Slovenia)
- Kikiriki (Maribor / Slovenia)
- Mr. Brutal's Hexen Kuche vs. Geisterfahrer (Beltinci / Slovenia)
- Šundrdisko (Domžale / Slovenia)
- Vomit Sprinkler (Brežice / Slovenia)

=== 2010 ===
April 2–3, Menza Pri Koritu

- End of Silence (Germany)
- SKLO (Czech republic)
- Fake Mistress (Germany)
- Fukte vs. Suburban Howl (Italy)
- Aluviana (Ljubljana / Slovenia)
- Supraphon Family (Slovakia)
- Napalmed (Czech republic)
- Dezroyadam (Turkey)
- The Superusers (Australia)
- Bas Bleu (Ljubljana / Slovenia)
- Billy Harris (USA)
- Jesus is Angry (Greece)

=== 2011 ===
April 1–2, Menza Pri Koritu

- Slip-Mattology (Italy)
- SKLO (Czech republic)
- Fukte (Italy)
- Andraž Jež (Ljubljana / Slovenia)
- Kikiriki (Maribor / Slovenia)
- Bally Corgan (USA)
- Lafidki (Cambodia)
- Ecoute La Merde (France)
- Ayankoko (France)
- Fragile (Italy)

=== 2012 ===
April 13–14, Menza Pri Koritu

- Pascal Cretain "Mindfuck Royale"- performance (Greece)
- Ontervjabbit (Hrastnik / Slovenia)
- Hoehenkontrolle (Germany)
- Narayan & Lunar Dawn (Croatia)
- Luxury Mollusc (Ireland)
- Mould (Vojsko / Slovenia)
- 7 Minutes of Nausea (Germany)
- Astma (duo: Alexei Borisov and Olga Nosova) (Russia)
- Hermetic Brisk (Bosnia)

Also on Saturday

30 minute video-projection entitled "TeleJunkster: How to lose friends and alienate potential sex partners" by Jesus Himself.

=== 2013 ===
April 12–13, Menza Pri Koritu

- Cadlag (Slovenia)
- Cathal Rodgers (Ireland)
- Dead Body Collection (Serbia)
- Dezroy Adam (Turkey)
- Extreme Smoke 57 (Slovenia)
- Fukte vs. Molestia Auricularum (Italy)
- Holzkopf (Canada)
- IOIOI (Italy)
- Java Delle (Germany)
- Jikuuuuuuuuuuu (Japan)
- Narayana (Croatia)
- Null/Void (Ireland)
- Nundata (Serbia)
- NW "Cup" (France)
- Paranoiz (Hungary)
- Phoresy (Ireland)
- Sist En 343 (Slovenia)
- DJ Balli + Slpizza (Italy)
- THEB10K (Slovenia).

== Aesthetic ==
The Noisefest is based on experimental and noise music and art, with almost all derivatives included. The artists that have performed at the festival range from noise music, industrial music, electronic music, and ambient music to avant garde, sludge rock, noisecore, and death metal. There have even been poetry readings. All other art forms featured in the festival are in some way related to this aesthetic. Metelkova's Yugoslav military history and architecture are integral parts of this aesthetic.

== Ethics ==
The festival is based on DIY ethics and remains independent of the mainstream music industry. This is another unique aspect of the festival. It is considered an international celebration of DIY Culture, with a focus on experimental arts. Communal vegetarian meals are organized every day of the festival for the artists and the audience. Since a lot of the artists have self-released albums which are not always widely available worldwide, the festival also acts as a swap meet for rare records and other artworks.

== See also ==
- List of experimental music festivals
- Cassette Culture
- List of noise musicians
- Experimental music
- Noise music
