= Sumkidz =

Youth organization based in Canada

Sumkidz Inc. (now known as Suma) was an artist-driven, community-focused collective based in Toronto, Canada. The organization was responsible for the coordination and promotion of the OM Festival, and was a supporter and promoter of the electronic music community in Canada.

== Description ==
Sumkidz promoted community arts and electronic music, as well as social and environmental justice. The collective made decisions through consensus.

For many years, the collective owned 'the DubBus', a green, full sized school bus which was used to support various Sumkidz and Sumkidz-affiliated events. It had been converted to run on waste vegetable oil. Sumkidz had taken the bus on tour around Canadian and US cities to promote and offer workshops on topics relating to renewable energy, environmental awareness, arts and music. The bus is sadly, no longer in service.

== See also ==
- OM Festival
- Not-for-profit corporation
- Harm reduction
