= Michelle Lou =

American composer and bassist

Michelle Lou is a composer and bassist. She won the Rome Prize in 2018. She was a Radcliffe Fellow at Harvard in 2013. She was a Fulbright Fellow in Austria and was a visiting assistant professor of music at UC Santa Cruz. Lou is currently an assistant professor of Composition and Computer Music at UC San Diego.

== Education ==
She studied at University of California San Diego, Stanford University, Conservatorio G. Nicolini in Piacenza, Italy, and the University for Music and Performing Arts in Graz, Austria.

Many of her works are published by Berlin-based Edition Gravis.
