= Doddodo =

Japanese composer and musician

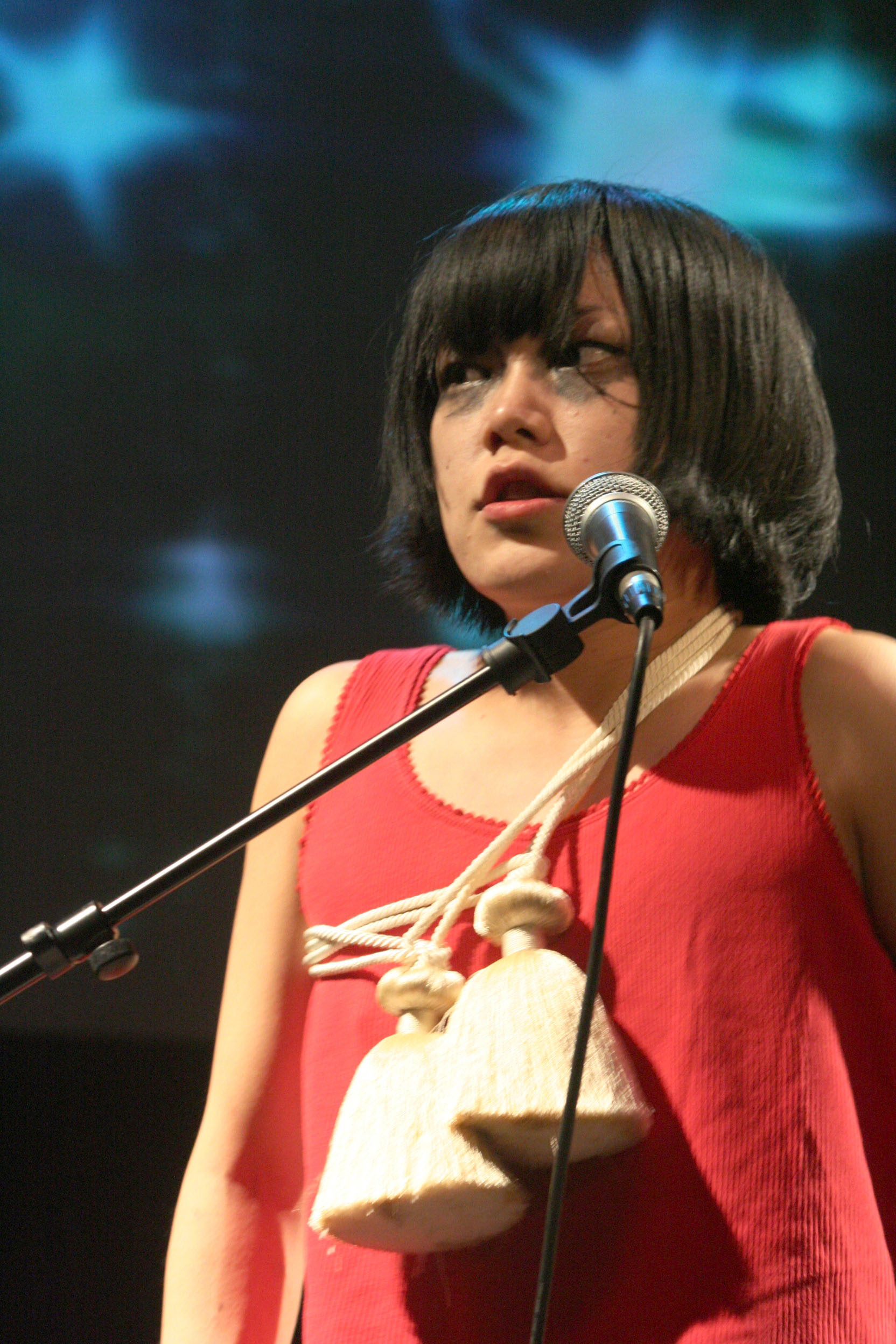
- Doddodo, 2009

Background information
- Born: Namin Haku
- Origin: Osaka, Japan
- Genres: Experimental, punk, hip hop, breakcore, min'yō
- Instrument: Programmer
- Years active: 1999 to present
- Labels: Adaadat, PowerShovel Audio; Renda

Doddodo (born Namin Haku, in Osaka, Japan) is an Electronic artist. Her sound has also been labelled as bastardised hip hop/breakcore, due to her heavy usage of intense drum breaks. She has been self releasing albums a for Japanese label Renda records (owned by Japanese cybergrind artist Maruosa) since 2002, before she was recommended to the UK eclectic label Adaadat, by fellow adaadat and renda artist Ove-Naxx.

== Career ==
Her music genre has been considered as Punk rock, Celtic Music and traditional. She uses samplers, casio keyboards and random instruments such as children's toys or banjo.

== Discography ==
- 2004 – Slime Core EP
- 2006 – Donomichi Doddodo
- 2006 – Greatereat
- 2006 – Sample Bitch Story
- 2011-"ど"

=== Other Releases ===
- 2002 – Bibibibibibin Vol.1(Split with Maruosa)
- 2008 – Limited Express(has gone?) × Doddodo(Split with Limited Express)
