= Juice (trio) =

British a cappella trio

Juice are a British a cappella voice trio, specialising in vocals with an experimental edge. They have performed their works on BBC Radio 3 and Classic FM. They also perform widely across the United Kingdom.

The current members are:

Kerry Andrew, alto
Sarah Dacey, soprano
Anna Snow, soprano

All are graduates of the University of York.

== Awards ==
Independent Music Awards 2012: Songspin - Best Contemporary Classical Album
