= Lisa Anne Auerbach =

American textile artist

- Born: 1967 (age 58–59)
- Education: RIT Art Center College of Design
- Known for: artistTextiles
- Website: lisaanneauerbach.com

Lisa Anne Auerbach (born 1967 in Ann Arbor, Michigan) is an American textile artist, zine writer, photographer, best known for her knitting works with humorous political commentary.

== Education ==
- MFA, Art Center College of Design, Pasadena, California, 1994
- BFA, Rochester Institute of Technology, Rochester, New York, 1990

== Biography ==
Born in 1967 in Ann Arbor, Michigan Auerbach currently resides in Los Angeles.

== Career ==
Auerbach has been making knitted pieces since completing her undergraduate degree at the Art Center of Design in 1994. Photography was the discipline she studied for her MFA, however, due to lack of access to a darkroom, she used knitting as a cost-effective way to make art.

== Work ==
Knit works, zines, newsletters and a 5-foot-tall magazine titled American Megazine are all part of her body of work. Her Knitting patterns are often created digitally and created with a knitting machine. "While Auerbach's slogans and signs are politically blunt, her humor infuses the work with subtlety, goofiness, mockery, and self-depreciation—sometimes all at once."

=== Major exhibitions ===
- 2019 "Libraries," Gavlak Gallery, Los Angeles, CA
- 2019 "Psychic Art Advisor," Frieze Los Angeles, Los Angeles, CA
- 2016 "Wasteland," Mona Bismarck Center and Gallerie Thaddaeus Ropac, Paris, France
- 2015 "Parasophia, Kyoto International Festival of Culture," Kyoto, Japan
- 2014 "Abstract America Today," Saatchi Collection, London, U.K.
- 2014 Whitney Biennial, Whitney Museum of American Art, New York, NY
- 2014 "Spells," Gavlak Gallery, Los Angeles, CA
- 2013 C.O.L.A. Individual Artist Fellowship Exhibition, Los Angeles Municipal Art Gallery, Los Angeles, CA
- 2012 "Chicken Strikken" Malmö Konsthall, Malmö, Sweden
- 2009 "Take This Knitting Machine and Shove It," Nottingham Contemporary, Nottingham, UK
- 2006 "Right On, Weatherman," CPK Kunsthal, Copenhagen, Denmark

=== Projects and Works ===
Lisa Anne Auerbach's Body Count Mittens depict a gun with a date and a number that is the accumulative number of American soldiers killed in Iraq. There is a different date and count on each individual mitten for the day knitting started on each. The instructions and the pattern for the mittens, along with a website for checking the daily American casualties, is listed publicly on a knitter's forum, allowing the public to make their own pair.

== Published works ==
- Lisa Anne Auerbach, Ann Arbor, MI : University of Michigan Museum of Art, 2010
