= Wonder Valley, California =

- Unincorporated Community
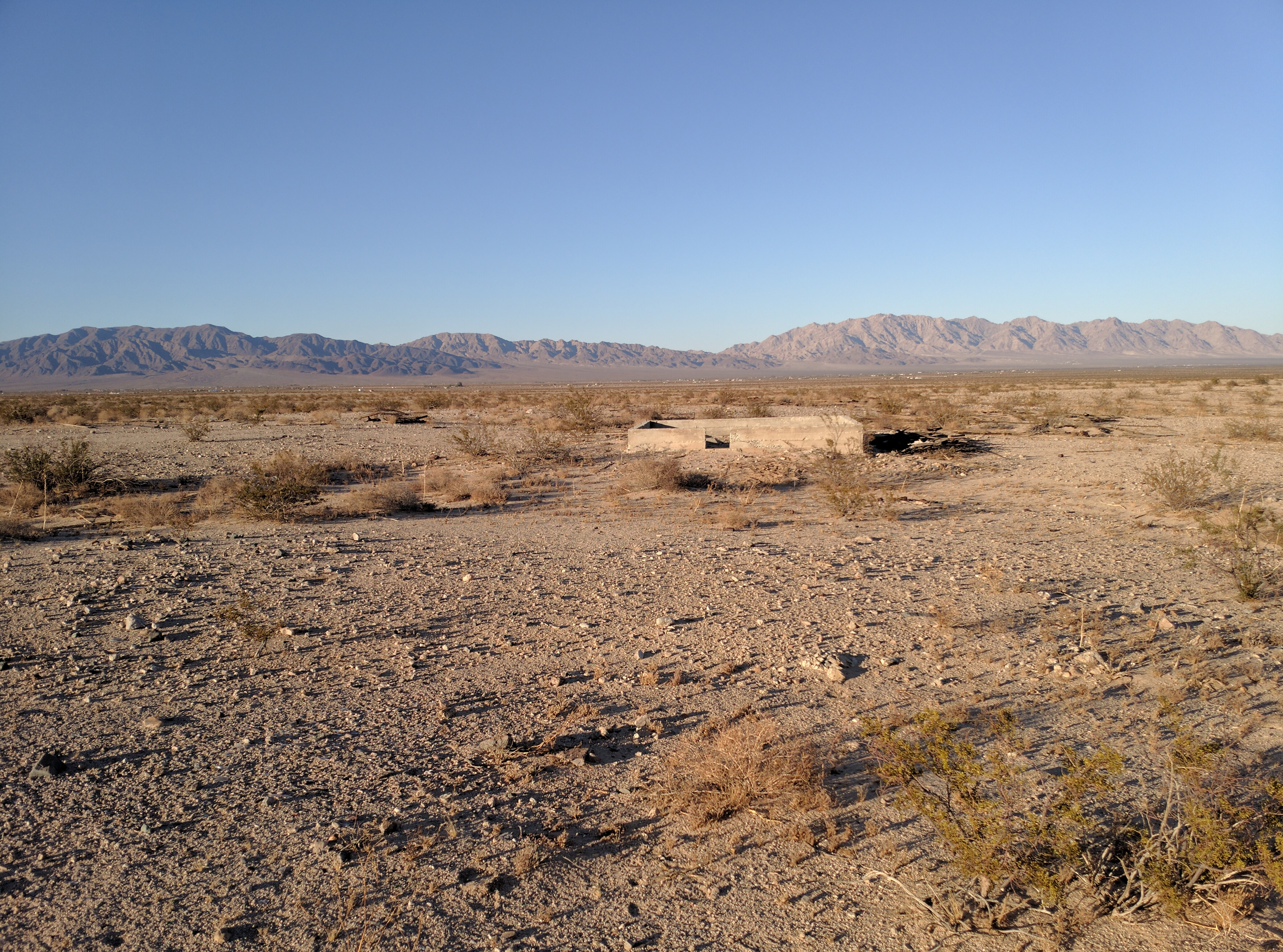
- Remnants of a small recreational cabin in Wonder Valley, CA

- Location within the state of California Wonder Valley, California (the United States)
- Coordinates: 34°9′4″N 115°55′53″W
- Country: United States
- State: California
- County: San Bernardino

Area
  - Total: 150 sq mi (380 km^{2})
  - Land: 150 sq mi (380 km^{2})
- Elevation: 1,500 ft (460 m)

Population (2013)
  - Total: 615
  - Density: 4.2/sq mi (1.6/km^{2})
- Time zone: UTC-8 (Pacific (PST))
  - Summer (DST): UTC-7 (PDT)
- ZIP codes: 92277
- Area codes: 442/760

Wonder Valley is a sparsely populated unincorporated community in the Morongo Basin of Southern California's High Desert region, straddling Amboy Road and State Route 62 in San Bernardino County, California, United States, approximately 10 miles (16 km) east of the city of Twentynine Palms.

== History ==
Wonder Valley was not substantively populated until the United States Congress approved the Small Tract Act (STA) of 1938, a homesteading law that facilitated the leasing and public-to-private transfer of ownership of parcels of up to five acres to United States citizens willing to improve the land by developing a residence, business, or recreational structure.

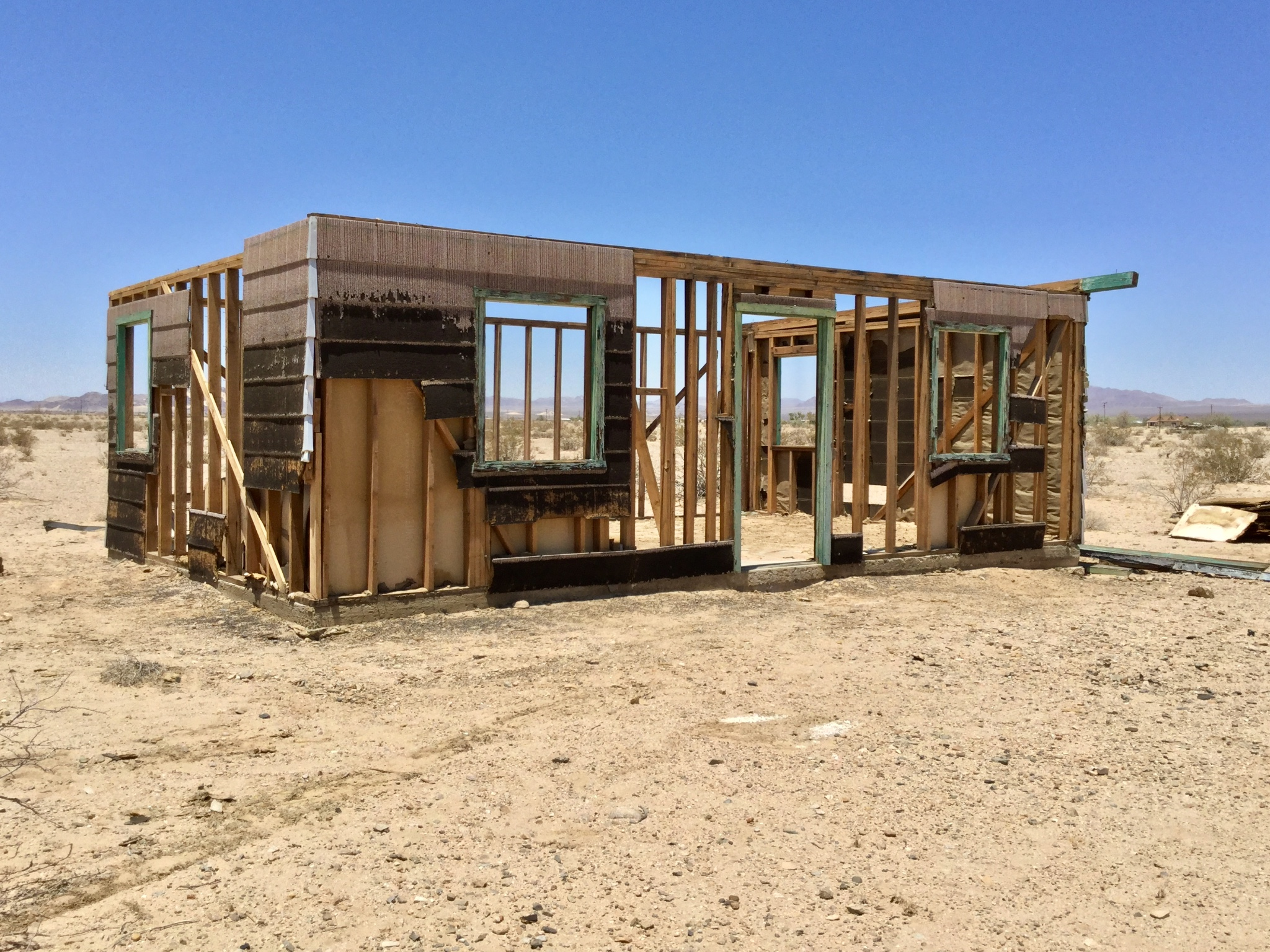
Typical “Jackrabbit” homestead cabin remains in Wonder Valley.

Thousands of cabins and other structures built by homesteaders, particularly during a period of popularity in the 1950s and 60s, have since been left abandoned. Although a cleanup effort in the early 2000s resulted the demolition of hundreds of abandoned structures, numerous structures built by Small Tract Act homesteaders still exist in various states of use and repair.

More recently, Wonder Valley has earned a reputation for being a fashionable destination for artists, a trend which is frequently attributed to Wonder Valley's association with nearby Joshua Tree National Park.

== Geography and climate ==
Wonder Valley occupies the gently sloping basin between the Sheep Hole Mountains and Bullion Mountains to the north and the Pinto Mountains to the south. Elevations in Wonder Valley range from 1,800 feet (550 m) in the valley's western reaches to 1,200 feet (370 m) near the eastern frontier of population within the valley. The nearest incorporated community is the city of Twentynine Palms, which lies about 10 miles (16 km) to the west. State Route 62 and Amboy Road both pass through Wonder Valley; most other roads in the community are unpaved.

Due to its low elevation relative to other communities of the Morongo Basin, Wonder Valley lies near the intersection of the higher-elevation Mojave Desert and the lower-elevation Colorado Desert. Wonder Valley's subtropical desert climate is characterized by very hot summers and cool winters with considerable diurnal temperature variation throughout the year. Moisture from the North American Monsoon contributes to summer precipitation and thunderstorm activity, and most non-monsoonal precipitation can be attributed to winter Pacific storms.

Wonder Valley is approximately 15 miles (24 km) northeast of the east entrance to Joshua Tree National Park.

== Infrastructure ==
=== Local ===
Wonder Valley is unincorporated and is under the jurisdiction of San Bernardino County. Residents of Wonder Valley are served by San Bernardino County's County Service Area (CSA) 70M, a special services district with taxing authority that provides residents with fire protection, park, and road maintenance services. Many residents of Wonder Valley live on large parcels of land consisting of 5 acres (2 ha), a result of the community's growth after the enactment of the Small Tract Act of 1938.

=== State and federal representation ===
In the California State Legislature, Wonder Valley is in the 12th senatorial district, represented by Republican Shannon Grove, and in the 34th Assembly district, represented by Republican Tom Lackey.

In the United States House of Representatives, Wonder Valley is in California's 23rd congressional district, represented by Republican Jay Obernolte.
