= CTM Festival =

Music and arts festival in Berlin

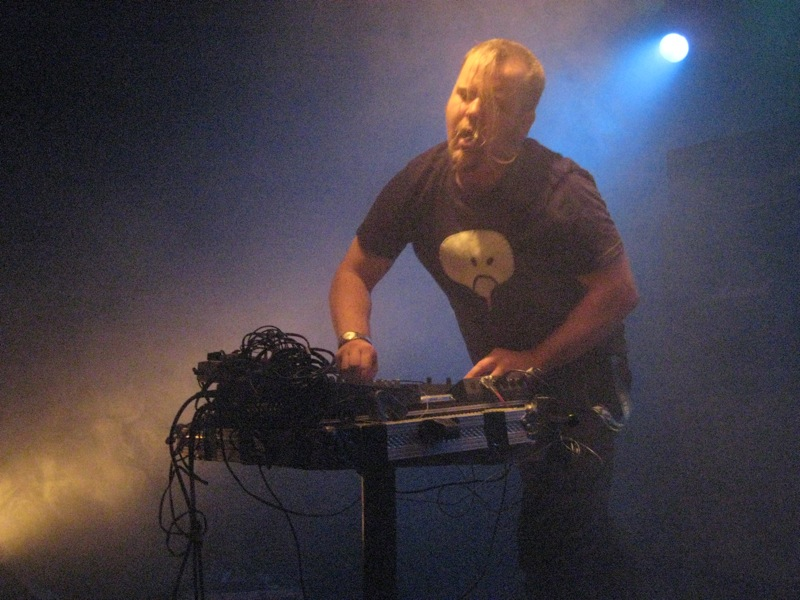
- Genre: Electronic music, Experimental music, Audiovisual art
- Dates: January/February
- Locations: Berlin, Germany
- Years active: 1999–present
- Website: www.ctm-festival.de

The annual CTM Festival (from 1999 to 2011 called club transmediale) is a music and visual arts event held in Berlin, Germany. Founded in 1999, the festival originally focused on electronic music, but has since evolved to cover a wide range of genres under the banner "Festival for Adventurous Music and Art".

Changing through various shapes and formats over the years, the festival currently takes place as a 10-day long event in which the music program is supplemented by an extensive daytime program of workshops, art installations, panel discussions, screenings and presentations that illustrate the latest artistic, technological and economic developments in music and media cultures.

Distinguishing the festival from many others in its field is the fact that CTM spotlights music’s social role in electronic and digital culture. Through the festival, as well as various events curated by CTM throughout the year, the organization reflects the latest musical currents against a backdrop of new technologies, modern art, historical perspective, and social issues.

The first festival was founded by five friends: Marcus Weiser and Lillevan Pobjoy of the electronic music duo Rechenzentrum, visual artist Timm Ringewaldt, photographer and lighting engineer Remaclus "Remco" Schuurbiers and experimental media design student Jan Rohlf. After the first edition in 1999, Lillevan Pobjoy and Tim Ringewaldt left. In 2000 the festival was organised by Marcus Weiser, Remaclus "Remco" Schuurbiers and Jan Rohlf. Oliver Baurhenn, who joined the core team in 2002, was part of the organising team in 2000.

== The early days of the festival (1999-2002) ==
In its early years, CTM was deeply embedded in Berlin's changing club culture, reflecting the energy of the post-reunification period and the city's vibrant underground music scene. The first edition in 1999 took place at Maria am Ostbahnhof, a venue that had only opened a few months earlier. Located in a disused GDR post office building at the Ostbahnhof, Maria quickly established itself as an important venue for experimental electronic music, attracting an audience keen to explore the boundaries between club culture, sound art and audiovisual performance. The raw industrial environment, with its exposed concrete, glass staircase and DIY aesthetic, provided an ideal backdrop for CTM's exploratory ethos.

For its second edition in 2000, CTM took an unexpected turn, moving out of Berlin's clubs and into a high-rise on Alexanderplatz, one of the city's most famous but notoriously boring public spaces. The festival was housed on the seventh floor of the Haus des Lehrers, a GDR-era office building with a huge socialist mural on the facade. The empty, fluorescent-lit space - originally intended for bureaucratic work rather than hedonistic sound experiments - was transformed into an ephemeral festival venue, offering a panoramic view of the city skyline at night. The contrast between the austere, functionalist architecture and the festival's immersive, energetic programme made for a particularly powerful experience.

In 2001, however, CTM did not take place. At the time, the festival was still closely linked to transmediale, which had been its institutional umbrella. That year, transmediale faced severe funding problems, forcing it to scale down. Since CTM relied heavily on its support, it had to skip a year - an absence that underlined the precarious nature of Berlin's independent festival landscape at the time.

When CTM returned in 2002, it did so in an almost mythical location: E-Werk. The cavernous former power station was a legendary club in Berlin in the early 1990s techno movement, hosting legendary nights. By the time CTM arrived, however, E-Werk was no longer the epi-centre of hedonism it had once been. The original clubbers had moved on, and the space lay abandoned. Its towering halls and vast dance floors eerily silent. This gave CTM the opportunity to reclaim it as a temporary playground for experimental sound, filling its empty chambers with radical performances, bass-heavy frequencies and site-specific installations.

E-Werk had played a fundamental role in shaping Berlin's electronic music history, and in some ways its atmosphere was a precursor to the later emergence of Berghain. The E-Werk and its looming presence in 2002 - both as a relic and a blank slate for reinvention - provided a poignant backdrop for CTM's return.

== One venue many formats - CTM from 2003 - 2009 ==
The direction of the festival changed when Oliver Baurhenn joined the team and the festival applied for public funding for the first time in 2003 with a programme called [GO EAST].

"This time round, the »CTM.03« team (Oliver Baurhenn, Jan Rohlf, Remco Schuurbiers, Marc Weiser) successfully enlarged the nine-day-long, lively »festival for electronic music and related visual arts« in exponential fashion: whereas last year’s venue was the already voluminous »E-Werk«, the location this time was the »Maria am Ufer«, whose two floors provided an ample space that, however, also offered the necessary intimacy. There was room here not only for several dozen laptop and VJ sets, but also for a programme that for the first time included discussion panels in addition to screenings, presentations, and installations. In addition, the CTM.03 compilation CD, a supplement to the English music magazine »THE WIRE«, with ›club‹ musicians such as Radboud Mens, Jan Jelinek, Otto von Schirach and others, came out in time. But the Slovenian label rx:tx also compiled a CD (»PROGRESS | the trieste-vladivostok ctm.03 line«) for the section of the CTM dedicated to eastern Europe - rather small-scale but with the striking title »[GO EAST]« -, to which labels such as the Polish Mik.Musik and the Serbian Belgradeyard Soundsystem were invited."

From 2002 to 2009 the festival took place in the prestigious Club Maria am Ufer, formerly known as Maria am Ostbahnhof. Everything was organised under one roof: Concerts, dance events, art exhibitions, workshops and a discourse programme in the style of Berlin's 1990s club culture, a place of experience, exchange and communication.

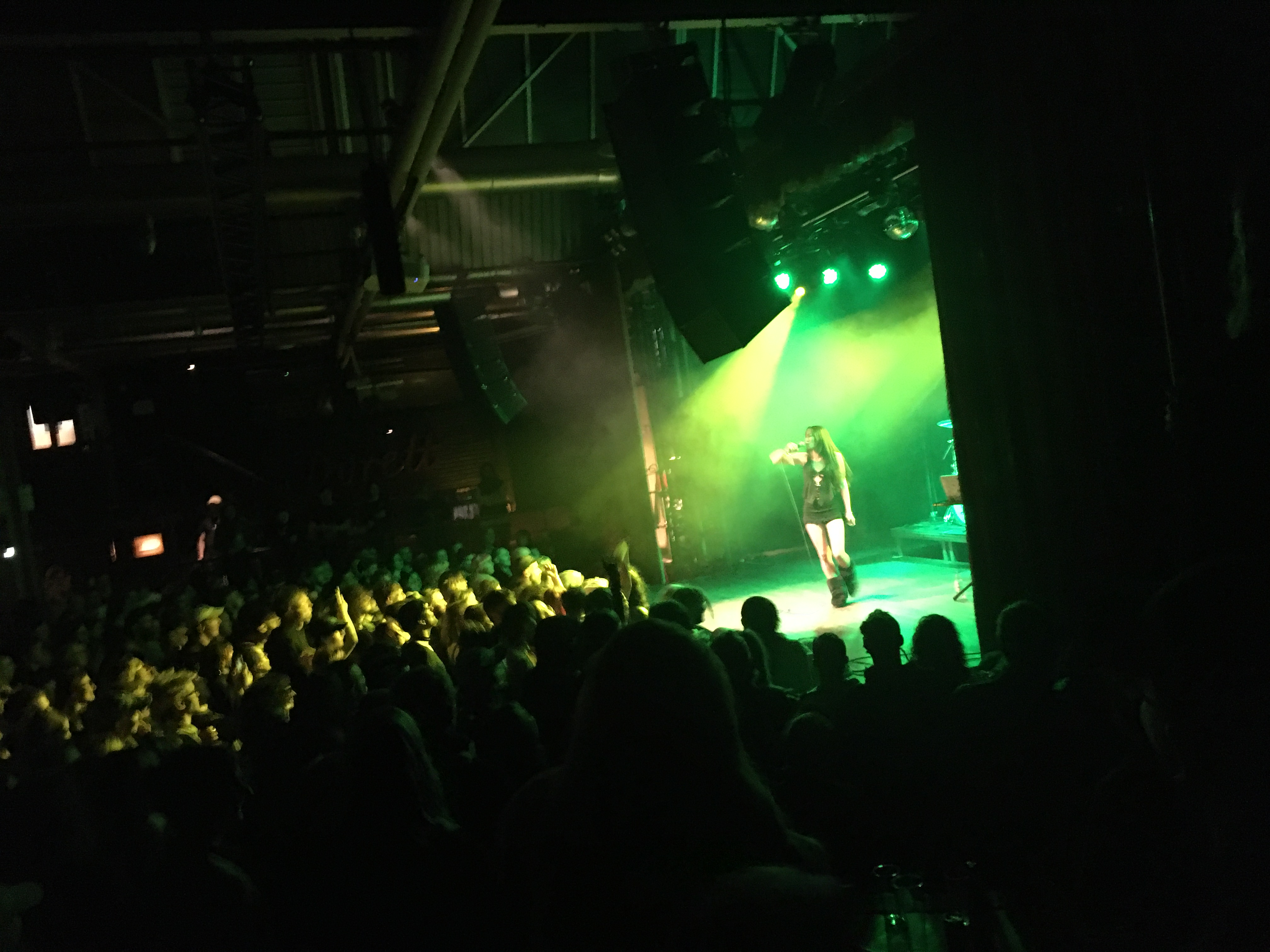
Lil Mariko performing at Festsaal Kreuzberg in CTM festival: Portals, Berlin, February 3rd 2023

== Festivals ==
=== CTM Berlin ===
Title	Theme	Edition	Date
CTM 2022	Contact	23rd Edition	
CTM 2021	Transformation	22nd Edition	19 January – 31 January 2021
CTM 2020	Liminal	21st Edition	24 January – 2 February 2020
CTM 2019	Persistence	20th Anniversary Edition	25 January – 3 February 2019
CTM 2018	Turmoil	19th Edition	26 January – 4 February 2018
CTM 2017	FearAngerLove	18th Edition	27 January – 5 February 2017
CTM 2016	New Geographies	17th Edition	29 January – 7 February 2016
CTM 2015	Un Tune	16th Edition	23 January – 1 February 2015
CTM 2014	Dis Continuity	15th Anniversary Edition	24 January – 2 February 2014
CTM.13	The Golden Age	14th Edition	28 January – 3 February 2013
CTM.12	Spectral	13th Edition	30 January – 5 February 2012
CTM.11	#Live!?	12th Edition	1 February – 6 February 2011
CTM.10	Overlap	11th Edition	28 January – 7 February 2010
CTM.09	Structures	10th Edition	22 January – 31 January 2009
CTM.08	Unpredictable	9th Edition	25 January – 2 February 2008
CTM.07	Building Space	8th Edition	25 January – 3 February 2007
CTM.06	Being Bold!	7th Edition	3 February – 11 February 2006
CTM.05	Basics	6th Edition	4 January – 12 February 2005
CTM.04	Fly Utopia!	5th Edition	30 January – 7 February 2004
CTM.03	Play Global	4th Edition	31 January – 8 February 2003
CTM.02	Go Public!	3rd Edition	5 February – 17 February 2002
CTM.00	Get Personal	2nd Edition	11 February – 20 February 2000
CTM.99	The Mirror Ball Of The Electronic Age	1st Edition	12 February – 21 February 1999

=== CTM Siberia ===
Title	Location	Dates
CTM Siberia	Krasnoyarsk	11–12 September 2015
CTM Siberia	Novosibirsk	14–20 September 2015

== Books ==
GENDERTRONICS – DER KÖRPER IN DER ELEKTRONISCHEN MUSIK

Edited by CTM and Meike Jansen

When, in the early 50s, electronic music appeared on the scene with the promise of abandoning all physical limits of music-making this was – like much besides – a Promethian male fantasy. Indeed, this music subsequently led to everything but disembodiment. From the psychedelic trances of the 60s and Kraftwerk robotics of the 70s, through to Techno ecstasies, gender-political interventions in the 90s and laptop performance – the questions as to how, from whom, to what ends and in which contexts electronics and the human body might be cable-linked have continually had to be addressed anew.

“Gendertronics” is an in-depth study of questions raised by last year’s festival theme, "Performing Sound", edited by CTM and Meike Jansen and published by Edition Suhrkamp Verlag. With contributions from Olaf Arndt, Claudia Basrawi, Jochen Bonz & Thomas Meinecke, Mariola Brillowska, Kurt Dahlke, Diedrich Diederichsen, Harald Fricke, Tom Holert, Miss Kittin, Pinky Rose, Birgit Richard, Terre Thaemlitz, Marc Weiser and 17 black and white drawings by Jan Rohlf. – In German language only.

== See also ==
- List of electronic music festivals
- List of experimental music festivals
