= GOGBOT =

Annual festival in Enschede, Netherlands

GOGBOT Festival
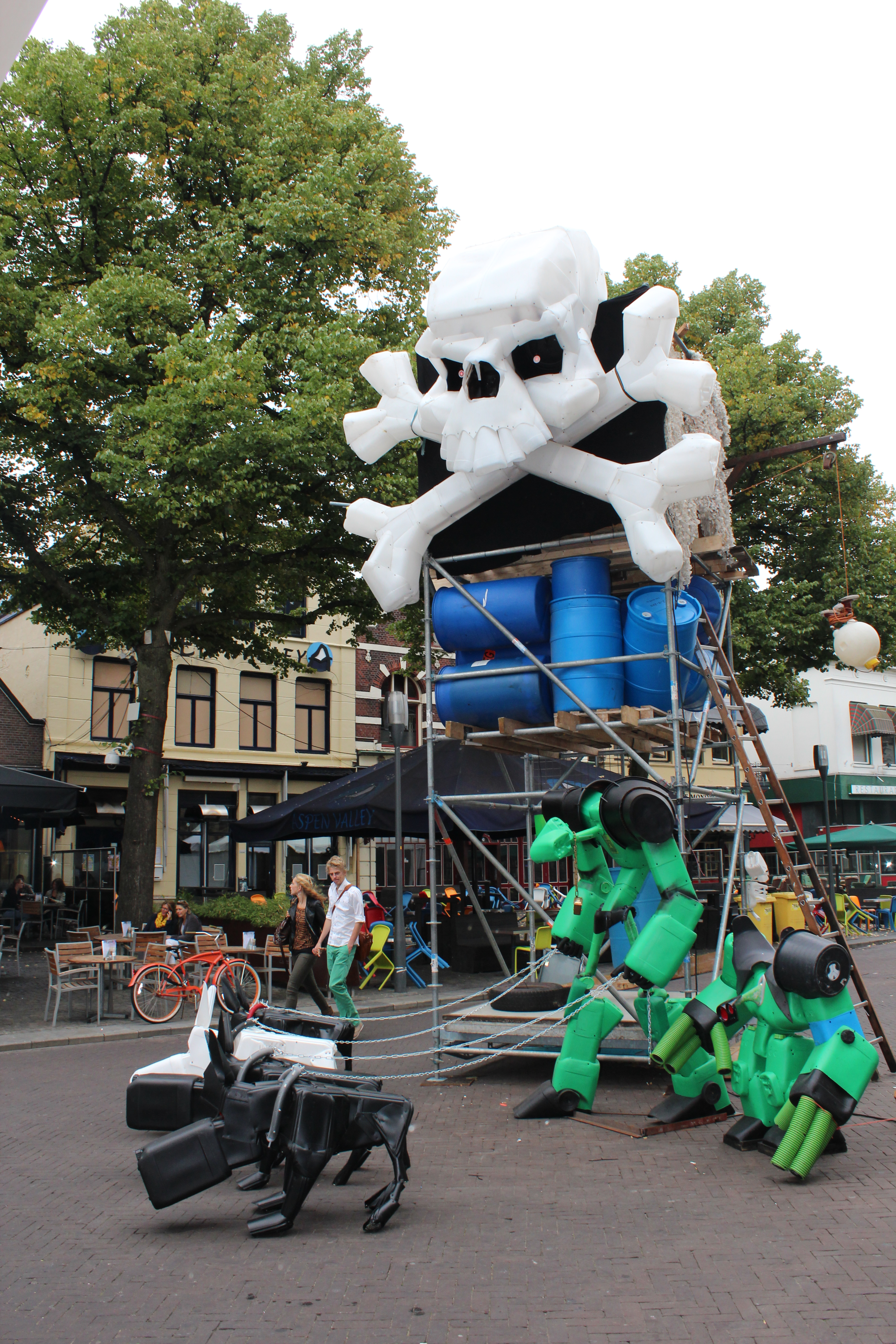
- Genre: multimedia, art, music and technology
- Locations: Enschede, Netherlands
- Years active: 2003-present
- Founders: PLANETART
- Attendance: 20,000
- Website: gogbot.nl

The GOGBOT Festival is an annual four-day festival in Enschede, Netherlands. It is organized by Planetart, a local group of artists, and was first organized in 2004. The festival revolves around multimedia, art, music, and technology and includes a three-month exhibition in collaboration with the local Rijksmuseum (RMT), a four-day exhibition during the festival, a symposium, a film program, and the Youngblood award for art academy graduates.
