= List of post-dubstep musicians =

This is a list of post-dubstep musicians.

== List ==
- Burial
- Chase & Status
- Darkstar
- Djrum
- Flux Pavilion
- Gemini
- Gold Panda
- Ikonika
- Jakwob
- James Blake
- Jamie Woon
- Jamie xx
- Joker
- Joy Orbison
- Kode9
- Magnetic Man
- Mount Kimbie
- Nero
- Scuba
- SBTRKT
- Sepalcure
- Stubborn Heart
- XXYYXX
- Zomby
