= Kai Campos =

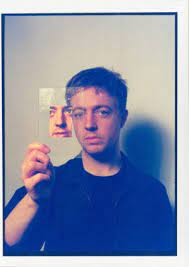

Background information
- Birth name: Kai Disney-Pollard
- Born: 4 February 1986 (age 39); St. Austell, Cornwall, England
- Genres: Electronic; post-dubstep; ambient; future garage
- Years active: 2008–present
- Member of: Mount Kimbie

Kai Campos (born 4 February 1986) is a British electronic musician from St Austell, Cornwall. He made his name as one half of Mount Kimbie alongside Dominic Maker and as a musician and DJ in the Greater London electronic music scene. He initially met Maker at Southbank University where he was studying film. The duo began making music together in a home studio in Peckham.

== Mount Kimbie (2008–present) ==
Shortly after meeting at university, the duo began to create music together and would quickly become innovators in dubstep and garage music. Their early EP releases, Maybes and Sketch on Glass created a dubstep sound that many tout as the inspiration behind "post-dubstep".

2010 saw the release of their debut album Crooks & Lovers, following which the group signed to Warp Records in 2012. They then released 2013's Cold Spring Fault Less Youth which saw the group expand on their sound and collaborate with artists like King Krule.

In 2016, Chance the Rapper sampled the Mount Kimbie track 'Adriatic' from their 2010 album on his mixtape Coloring Book featuring performances from Justin Bieber and Towkio.

The group's 2017 release Love What Survives featured collaborations with King Krule, Micachu and Andrea Balency, along with longtime collaborator James Blake.

In 2021, the group announced a limited edition vinyl release of two tracks that were part of the Love What Survives recordings entitled Blue Stone/Blue Liquid. The release was accompanied by a video directed by Peter Eason Daniels.

Kai contributed to one half of Mount Kimbie’s first full-length release since 2017’s Love What Survives with MK 3.5: Die Cuts | City Planning. Kai’s half of the album, City Planning, is a collection of his solo tracks created over a few years prior to the release. The project is layered with physical textures and utilises improvisational techniques.

== Solo work ==
In 2018, Campos curated a techno-driven DJ-Kicks mix following which he has been seen DJ'ing consistently, including headlining sets at Printworks & Fabric and a b2b tour with Actress. Campos further collaborated on Actress' first Ninja Tune release in two years with 2022's 'AZD Surf'. Clash Magazine said the song 'presents warped electronics, the distorted colours merging into one remarkable whole.' Campos' debut BBC Radio 1 "Essential Mix" was broadcast on 7 January 2023.

=== City Planning ===
Kai Campos released the City Planning album as part of Mount Kimbie's MK 3.5: Die Cuts | City Planning album. Resident Advisor quotes that City Planning is "completely instrumental and largely rooted in techno, this disc was apparently inspired by a growing interest in Detroit electronic music history, which you can hear in the Mills-esque arpeggios of "Zone 3 (City Limits)" or "Quartz," which sounds like a Motor City producer who was raised on Euro mnml instead of Minimal Nation."

=== Four World Set ===
City Planning, which Campos says was inspired by kinetic sculpture, received an actual urban footprint via an outdoor installation by sculptor Tom Shannon, who created a stack of giant silvery balls to represent the music’s eerie sheen. The 30-foot sculpture piece titled "Four World Set" was situated in St Giles Square in Tottenham Court Road, London and unveiled on 31 October 2022, and was art directed by Frank Lebon. The Four World Set was a sculpture composed of four inflated spheres arranged as a tetrahedron, with each sphere made of an inflatable mirrored mylar, and when stacked, the spheres mirror each other infinitely at four touch points. The sculpture sadly had an abrupt end due to high winds.

=== Live shows ===
In October 2022, Campos debuted his new hardware live show at a Kai Campos curates night at fabric inviting guests Marcel Dettmann and Rødhåd.
