= The Sunset Violent =

Studio album by Mount Kimbie
- Released: 5 April 2024
- Studios: A home studio in Yucca Valley, California; An Airbnb and a studio in Tottenham, London
- Genre: Indie rock
- Length: 36:41
- Label: Warp
- Producers: Dominic Maker; Kai Campos; Dilip Harris

Mount Kimbie chronology
MK 3.5: Die Cuts | City Planning (2022)	The Sunset Violent (2024)

Singles from The Sunset Violent
- 1. "Boxing" Released: 13 September 2023; 2. "Dumb Guitar" Released: 2 November 2023; 3. "Fishbrain" Released: 7 February 2024; 4. "Empty and Silent" Released: 13 March 2024

The Sunset Violent is the fourth studio album by English band Mount Kimbie, released on 5 April 2024 by Warp Records. The album is Mount Kimbie's first as a quartet, and also features contributions to two tracks by King Krule. It was written and recorded in Yucca Valley, California, and finished in London. The Sunset Violent is an indie rock album, a significant departure from their prior electronic style.

== Background ==
The album is Mount Kimbie's first as a quartet, after the primary duo, Dominic Maker and Kai Campos, invited Andrea Balency-Béarn and Marc Pell to join the band. Both Balency-Béarn and Pell had toured with the band for about seven years prior. It also features contributions from King Krule, who had previously appeared on two songs from 2013's Cold Spring Fault Less Youth, one from 2017's Love What Survives, and the 2018 standalone single "Turtle Neck Man".

The Sunset Violent is the band's first studio album since Love What Survives, not counting the 2022 double album MK 3.5: Die Cuts | City Planning whose two halves were made separately by Maker and Campos. Following MK 3.5, Maker and Campos focused on solo ventures: Maker took on producing sessions with artists including SZA, Jay-Z, Arlo Parks, and Rosalía, while Campos started a residency at Rinse FM.

Though the band originated in electronic music, they were open from the beginning about their influences including non-electronic music, including Maker citing rock bands such as TV on the Radio and Yeah Yeah Yeahs. They had also previously dabbled in rock sounds, particularly with post-punk on Love What Survives.

== Release ==
On 13 September 2023, the band released the single "Boxing", featuring King Krule and originally a Bandcamp exclusive available only for a week. On 2 November, they released the single "Dumb Guitar", and announced a tour of Europe and the US in April and May, featuring George Riley, Nabihah Iqbal, and Chanel Beads.

The album was announced on 7 February 2024, with a release date of 5 April by Warp. The announcement came with the release of the album's lead single, "Fishbrain", and a music video directed by Tegen Williams which was inspired by the charcoal animations of South African artist William Kentridge.

The fourth single, the album's closing track "Empty and Silent", was released on 13 March. It features vocals from King Krule, and was released with a music video directed by Gregory Prestön. The track was described as a "pretty, playful piece of music built from warm Tangerine Dream synth-tones and shambling indie jangle" where King Krule's "echo-drenched voice sounds perfectly at home."

A music video for "Shipwreck" was released on 3 April, directed by Jay Izzard and based on a concept from the band and Duncan Loudon.

On 27 March 2025, the band released The Sunset Violent Remixes, a three-track EP containing remixes by Astrid Sonne, DJ Python, and Special Request.

== Writing and recording ==
The album was written and recorded in a "disused frat house" in Yucca Valley, California. The goal behind choosing Yucca Valley was to find a space near Los Angeles, where Maker was living at the time, but without too many distractions. Campos said he didn't think much of working in the desert at first, but after being out there for a bit, he realized that everything they had been writing came off "desert rocky", particularly in the way they applied reverb to their guitars. They spent six weeks in California, keeping themselves sane by waking up early to catch the European Football Championships. With a collection of demos, the group returned to London to finish the record, first setting up in an Airbnb before transitioning to a proper studio in Tottenham.

Campos described the recording process as different from their previous albums because "fundamentally we were both doing very different things", enabling them to "observe somewhat objectively what the other person was doing and offer encouragement and support because you were not directly involved in the same way." Maker and Campos gave praise to Balency-Béarn and Pell for their contributions to the record, with Maker calling them "endlessly enthusiastic and brilliant musicians" whose energy "really helped to shape the record". Unlike previous Mount Kimbie projects where they would come in after the creation process was finished and record as session musicians, the two were much more hands-on for The Sunset Violent, including Balency-Béarn's contributions to vocals and Pell's ideas for percussion.

Discussing his impression of Yucca Valley, Maker said "The thing that I always think of is scale. It's all low rise housing, vast desert landscapes and sunsets. It's where you start getting the huge big trucks that everyone's driving; everything's a big gulp drink, everything is supersize."

== Style ==
The Sunset Violent is an indie rock album, considered a significant departure from Mount Kimbie's original post-dubstep sound. Specific styles covered include Radiohead-style rocktronica on "Dumb Guitar", Joy Division timbre with dream pop backing vocals on "Shipwreck", and a New Romantic keyboard solo on "Fishbrain". The lyrics often focus on "apathy and the numbing effect of overstimulation". Les Inrockuptibles's Rémi Boiteux noted influence from the Dean Blunt albums Black Metal and Black Metal 2.

== Reception ==
The Sunset Violent ratings
Aggregate scores
Source	Rating
AnyDecentMusic?	7.5/10
Metacritic	76/100
Review scores
Source	Rating
AllMusic	3.5/5 stars
Exclaim!	7/10
The Line of Best Fit	8/10
Loud and Quiet	9/10
MusicOMH	4/5 stars
Paste	8/10
Pitchfork	6.8/10

According to the review aggregator Metacritic, The Sunset Violent received "generally favorable reviews" based on a weighted average score of 76 out of 100 from 7 critic scores.

Loud and Quiet's Sam Walton called the album "an ambitious and carefully constructed record that feels far grander than its modest 37 minutes would suggest, full of compelling, forward-facing rock music made up of compositionally complex but still accessible songs. It's also the band's best yet." Exclaim!'s Spencer Nafekh-Blanchette called the album "oftentimes soft and subdued, sometimes fast and exciting, but constantly strange and disorienting in the best of ways", and said that the band "throw things at the wall and see what sticks — those flung with high velocity make the most impact."

MusicOMH's Ben Devlin wrote that the album "feels like the completion of a journey: Mount Kimbie have become a very different act with a sound palette that isn't beholden to any one genre, and on track after track they prove themselves to be masters of their own style." Flood Magazine's Jeff Terich wrote that while "not every idea here is necessarily a revelation ... the overall impression is one of a band enjoying the possibilities of a new approach and a new configuration, breaking conventions and shattering expectations—and seemingly having a lot of fun doing it." AllMusic's Paul Simpson said the album was "easily the most unified record Mount Kimbie has produced, especially in stark contrast to their previous effort."

The Sunset Violent was nominated for Best Independent Album at the 2024 AIM Independent Music Awards, but lost to Jorja Smith's Falling or Flying.

== Track listing ==
All tracks are written by Kai Campos, Dominic Maker, and Andrea Balency-Béarn, except where noted.

The Sunset Violent track listing
No.	Title	Writer(s)	Length
1.	"The Trail"	Balency-Béarn; Campos	2:55
2.	"Dumb Guitar"		5:11
3.	"Shipwreck"		4:05
4.	"Boxing" (featuring King Krule)	Campos; Maker	3:07
5.	"Got Me"	Campos; Maker	2:21
6.	"A Figure in the Surf"		4:51
7.	"Fishbrain"		4:37
8.	"Yukka Tree"	Balency-Béarn; Campos	3:26
9.	"Empty and Silent" (featuring King Krule)	Balency-Béarn; Campos; Maker; Archy Marshall	6:08
Total length:			36:41

Japanese edition (bonus track)
No.	Title	Length
10.	"Lemonadedream_19" (Demo)	1:24
Total length:		38:15

== Personnel ==
- Dominic Maker – producer (1, 3, 5–9)
- Kai Campos – producer (1, 3–9), mixing engineer
- Dilip Harris – producer, mixing engineer, programmer (2)

== Charts ==
Chart performance for The Sunset Violent
Chart (2024)	Peak position
Belgian Albums (Ultratop Flanders)	121
Scottish Albums (Official Charts)	53
UK Album Downloads (Official Charts)	46
UK Albums Sales (OCC)	38
UK Independent Albums (Official Charts)	16
UK Physical Albums (OCC)	36
