= You're Too Precious =

Single by James Blake
- Released: 24 April 2020
- Recorded: Blake's home studio
- Genre: Pop
- Length: 3:43
- Label: Polydor
- Songwriters: James Blake; Dominic Maker
- Producers: Blake; Maker

James Blake singles chronology
"Mulholland" (2019)	"You're Too Precious" (2020)	"Are You Even Real?" (2020)

Music video
- "You're Too Precious" on YouTube

"You're Too Precious" is a song by English electronic music producer and singer-songwriter James Blake released on 24 April 2020 by Polydor Records. It was written and produced by Blake alongside frequent collaborator Dominic Maker of English electronic music duo Mount Kimbie. "You're Too Precious" has been described as a pop song built around a piano melody and "subdued beats," and features heavy use of vocal manipulation. Lyrically, it is about how "after a certain amount of time, somebody becomes too precious to lose, and now you want to protect them in any way you can," referring to his girlfriend Jameela Jamil.

The song has been met with acclaim, with critics describing it as "beautiful" and praising its structure. It was accompanied with a music video directed by animator Orfeo.

== Background and recording ==
James Blake first teased "You're Too Precious" in October 2019 at the Austin City Limits Music Festival, disclosing that he was "really excited about" sharing it, but was unsure as to when it would be released. In an Instagram Live video on 20 April 2020, he revealed that the track originated from an idea that frequent collaborator Dominic Maker of English electronic music duo Mount Kimbie had sent him cut from a piano and vocal recording that Blake had made. He added that he wrote the song spontaneously in his home studio after he suddenly woke up at 4 a.m., before immediately going back to sleep. The song was finally released on four days later via Polydor Records, with Blake saying that he "thought it might be a nice accompaniment to a lockdown dinner."

== Composition and lyrics ==
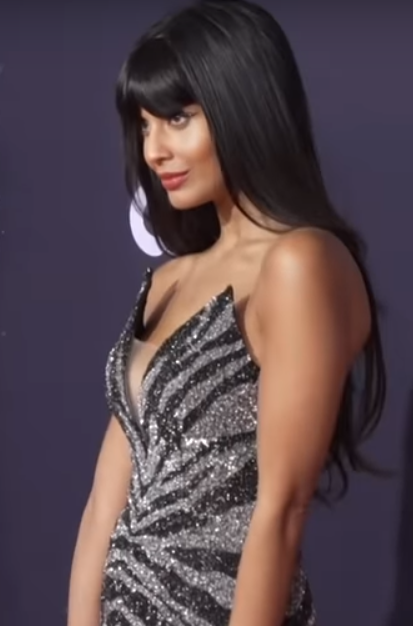
The song's lyrics refer to Blake's girlfriend Jameela Jamil

"You're Too Precious" was written and produced by Blake alongside Maker. Discussing the track in October 2019, Blake revealed that it was about "wanting to take a little bit of someone’s load and just loving that person," and told Apple Music that it reflected how "after a certain amount of time, somebody becomes too precious to lose, and now you want to protect them in any way you can," referring to his girlfriend Jameela Jamil. Carlos Hawthorn of Resident Advisor noted how the track continues in the same romantic vein of Blake's previous album Assume Form (2019), writing that "the mood is sweet and loved-up." MTV's Trey Alston wrote that the song's lyrics show how Blake "he can't help but adore everything about" his partner and "frantically explaining what he would do for them."

Musically, "You're Too Precious" is a pop song built around a "lilting piano melody and subdued beats" mixed with "electronic hullabaloos," "hardened bass" and "what sounds like castanets," prompting Wren Graves of Consequence of Sound to call it a "study in contrasts." The track heavily features vocal manipulation; Blake "twists and contorts his voice like an instrument" creating "high-pitched flutters forming a glitchy melody" which contrast with his "half-whispered vocal purrs." BrooklynVegan's Andrew Sacher noted that the track initially recalls the "atmospheric, experimental side" of Blake's earlier work before building to "the more pop-oriented direction he tends to go in lately," while Josiah Hughes of Exclaim! claimed that "the song is either understated or packed with subtle layers depending on how closely you decide to listen."

== Critical reception ==
"You're Too Precious" was met with critical acclaim, with critics describing it as "beautiful" and commending its structure. Carlos Hawthorn of Resident Advisor described it as "a beautiful song, busy yet cohesive, every piece with its place and purpose," comparing it favourably to Blake's 2018 single "If the Car Beside You Moves Ahead". Similarly, DIY wrote that it was "a pulsating and delicate love song" and a "an absolutely gorgeous new’un to soundtrack your weekend in style," while Frankie Dunn placed it on i-D's list of the best music that came out that week, calling it "very beautiful." Consequence of Sound writer Wren Graves praised the use of sonic contrast in the production "like all the best of Blake," and Matt Melis of the same site listed it as one of the best songs released that week. Josiah Hughes of Exclaim! considered the song "another fascinating production from Blake," while Robin Murray of Clash dubbed it a "purring, romantic hymn" and commended it as a "neat forward step" from his previous album. Writing for Dancing Astronaut, Chris Stack claimed that it "carries a haunting harmonic element for a perfect chiller or relaxation piece."

== Music video ==
A music video for "You're Too Precious" premiered on YouTube on the song's release date, and was directed by Orfeo, who Blake described as an "unbelievable animator." Chris Stack of Dancing Astronaut considered that it "encapsulates the tender allure to the soft tonal sounds."

== Charts ==
Chart (2020)	Peak position
Belgium (Ultratip Bubbling Under Flanders)	28
New Zealand Hot Singles (RMNZ)	21
