= I'll Come Too =

Song by James Blake

from the album Assume Form
- Genre: Art pop, traditional pop, doo-wop
- Length: 3:42
- Label: Polydor
- Songwriter(s): James Blake; Bruno Nicolai
- Producer(s): James Blake; Dominic Maker

Music video
- "I'll Come Too" on YouTube

"I'll Come Too" is a song by English electronic music producer and singer-songwriter James Blake from his fourth studio album, Assume Form.

== Composition ==
"I'll Come Too" was written by Blake which contained a sample from "La Contessa, Incontro", as written and performed by Bruno Nicolai. The track was also co-produced by Dominic Maker of electronic music duo Mount Kimbie. The song was written about accompanying his girlfriend, actress Jameela Jamil, on her extended work trips.

In an interview with BBC, Blake revealed about the song:

"I was remembering a moment. It's about the inception of a new love and that moment where you're aimlessly following this person wherever you can. You have this kind of magnetic pull where you'll say, 'Let's drive around till three in the morning,' because you don't want go home, you don't want to be away from them."

Fred Thomas of AllMusic called the track explored the "themes of love, longing, and forgiveness" of the album. He further explained as "he's eagerly chasing a crush from New York to L.A." Brian Howe of The A.V. Club described the track as "an undersea torch song all beautifully blue and green".

== Critical reception ==
Upon Assume Form release, "I'll Come Too" was met with favourable reviews. Alexis Petridis of The Guardian compared the track to Harry Nilsson's pop releases. James Rettig of Stereogum praised the production and called it "sounds like it's coming out of a Disney music box". On a round table review of the album, Mariel Fechik and Shayna Chabrow of Atwood Magazine called the track as their favourite of the album. Fechik highlighted the sound and describing it as "something so simultaneously otherworldly and nostalgic", while Chabrow called the song as a "beautiful, airy, track that makes the heart flutter".

== Live performances ==
Blake performed the song as well as six other tracks on a live session at KCRW for the station's Morning Becomes Eclectic program. Blake made his daytime television debut by performing the song on The Ellen DeGeneres Show on 24 May 2019. Blake also performed the track on The Tonight Show Starring Jimmy Fallon on 18 December 2019.

== Music video ==
An accompanying music video was released on 19 December 2019, following Blake's performance of the song on The Tonight Show Starring Jimmy Fallon. It was edited by Matt Meech, who also edited the documentary series Planet Earth II. The video features nature documentary footage of macaroni penguins and albatrosses as a courtesy of BBC Earth. The footage was shot on Snares Islands / Tini Heke, New Zealand.

The creative process of the video started when Blake contacted Meech through his website in August 2019, asking if Meech had appropriate footage in his archive. "James wanted to involve penguins, but most penguin stories are monographic - just black and white," said Meech. "We have cuddling penguins and things but I thought it needed more grit than that because the music's so [compelling]."

Mark Savage of BBC praised the connection and the music and called it "beguiling". "Blake's heavily processed backing vocals taking the place of birdsong as the story unfolds," Savage added.

== Personnel ==
- James Blake – vocals, production, co-mixing, piano, programming, synthesizers
- Dominic Maker – co-production, programming
- Nathan Boddy – co-mixing
- John Armstrong – recording engineering assistance
- Eric Eylands – recording engineering assistance

Credits adapted from Tidal.

== Charts ==
Chart (2019)	Peak position
US Hot Dance/Electronic Songs (Billboard)	30
