= Don't Miss It =

2018 song by James Blake

Single by James Blake

from the album Assume Form
- Released: 4 June 2018
- Length: 4:54
- Label: Polydor
- Songwriter: James Blake
- Producers: James Blake; Dominic Maker (co.); Dan Foat (exec.)

James Blake singles chronology
"If the Car Beside You Moves Ahead" (2018)	"Don't Miss It" (2018)	"Mile High" (2019)

"Don't Miss It" is a song by English electronic music producer and singer-songwriter James Blake from his fourth album, Assume Form. It was written by Blake and produced alongside Dominic Maker of electronic music duo Mount Kimbie and Dan Foat. A lyric video was released on 24 May 2018, having been premiered that day on an episode of his BBC Radio 1 residency. However, it was only released as single by Polydor Records on 4 June of that year. It is a piano ballad with additional drums accompanied by Blake's auto-tuned vocals.

The song received acclaim from music critics, however, a mixed review by Pitchfork, which labelled the track as "sad boy music" was met with a critical response from Blake, who deemed the expression "unhealthy and problematic when used to describe men just openly talking about their feelings."

== Composition ==
"Don't Miss It" is a piano ballad composed in the key of E major with a tempo of 70 beats per minute while Blake's vocals span a range of G#_{3} to F#_{5}. The song is centered around a piano part and places a focus on Blake's auto-tuned and glitching vocals. Programmed and live drums, tape hiss and operatic samples are added and removed throughout the track. Lyrically, the song is about how tempting it is to disappear. Olivia Ovenden of Esquire noted that the track was similar to Blake's song "Retrograde" and deemed the song's lyrics "particularly angsty even for Blake".

== Critical reception ==
"Don't Miss It" received acclaim from music critics. Cerys Kenneally of The Line Of Best Fit wrote that the song "continues to encapsulate his raw talent" and added that "Blake has undoubtedly exceeded himself in terms of finding his signature sound." Variance's Tyler Schmitt called the song "stunning", writing "if you're in need of a good playlist, we've got you covered. It's just James Blake's new song on repeat." Philip Cosores, writing for Uproxx, featured the song on his "Best New Indie Music From This Week" list, writing "the tracks [sic] is another example of Blake turning his emotional vulnerability into a fine piece of art." Hypebeast's Davis Huynh featured the track on his "Best New Tracks" list, writing "it does appear that James Blake is getting back into the groove of releasing new tracks – which is always a good thing." Vulture placed the song on their "6 Best New Songs of the Week" list, calling the song "the saddest computer music that could possibly exist" and described the track as "initially unsettling, but then it all crystallizes." Complex named it one of the best songs of the month of May, calling it "a gorgeous, haunting song." Harriet Gibsone of The Guardian deemed the track one of the best of 2018.

=== Pitchfork review and "sad boy" comment ===
In a mixed review for Pitchfork, Kevin Lozano wrote that "'Don't Miss It,' is another beautifully brutal song to add to Blake's large catalog of sumptuous sad boy music", adding that "while it's hard to deny the prettiness of Blake's music, the mopeyness of it all is starting to feel cloistered. Maybe he needs a night out." The music magazine also tweeted "Yes, James Blake is still sad", to which Blake replied "Case in point". Blake later posted a letter on Twitter, writing "I can’t help but notice, as I do whenever I talk about my feelings in a song, that the words 'sad boy' are used to describe it. I've always found that expression to be unhealthy and problematic when used to describe men just openly talking about their feelings." He added that "we are already in an epidemic of male depression and suicide" and that "we don't need any further proof that we have hurt men with our questioning of their need to be vulnerable and open." Various other artists came out in support of the singer, including Olly Alexander from British synth-pop band Years & Years and English singers Mabel and Anne-Marie.

== Personnel ==
- James Blake – vocals, piano, production, co-mixing
- Dominic Maker – co-production
- Dan Foat – executive production
- Nathan Boddy – co-mixing
- Joshua Smith – recording engineering
- John Armstrong – assistant recording engineering
- Eric Eylands – assistant recording engineering

== Charts ==
Chart performance for "Don't Miss It"
Chart (2019)	Peak position
US Hot Dance/Electronic Songs (Billboard)	39
