= Sepalcure (album) =

Studio album by Sepalcure
- Released: November 21, 2011
- Genres: Future garage, post-dubstep, techno
- Length: 52:04
- Label: Hotflush Recordings

Professional ratings
Aggregate scores
Source	Rating
Metacritic	82/100
Review scores
Source	Rating
Beats per Minute	84%
The Boston Phoenix	3.5/4 stars
Drowned in Sound	6/10
Mojo	4/5 stars
Pitchfork	8.4/10
PopMatters	8/10
Resident Advisor	4.5/5
Spin	8/10
Sputnikmusic	4.5/5
Uncut	4/5 stars

Sepalcure is the full-length self-titled debut album from the Brooklyn, New York duo Sepalcure, consisting of Travis Stewart, better known as machinedrum, and Praveen Sharma. Pitchfork placed the album at number 47 on its list of the "Top 50 albums of 2011".

== Track listing ==
1. "Me" 4:25
2. "Pencil Pimp" 6:01
3. "The One" 5:40
4. "See Me Feel Me" 5:01
5. "Eternally Yrs" 5:10
6. "Yuh Nuh See" 5:15
7. "Breezin" 6:39
8. "Hold On" 4:29
9. "Carrot Man" 5:02
10. "Outside" 4:22
