= Hyph Mngo =

2009 song

Single by Joy Orbison
- B-side: "Wet Look"
- Released: 14 September 2009
- Genre: Dubstep; UK garage; house
- Length: 5:38
- Label: Hotflush (HFT009)
- Songwriter(s): Peter O'Grady

Joy Orbison singles chronology
"Hyph Mngo" (2009)	"J. Doe" (2009)

"Hyph Mngo" is a 2009 song by Joy Orbison. His debut single, it was influential in the dubstep genre and was included in a number of "best of" lists.

== Release ==
"Hyph Mngo" was Joy Orbison's first single. It was first played on a mix for Fabric by Ben UFO in May 2009, and was later included in a mix by Scuba on Rinse FM on 25 June 2009. The track was distributed on various white labels throughout the summer before an official release on 14 September 2009 on Hotflush Recordings.

== Composition ==
The Guardian described "Hyph Mngo" as a mix of dubstep, UK garage, and house, while Pitchfork described it as a dubstep track. The Irish Times noted techno influences. Szatan compares it in style and pacing to the work of Digital Mystikz, an influential early dubstep group. DJ Mag described it as being influential for the future garage genre.

== Reception ==
Pitchfork named "Hyph Mngo" the best new track in its week of release. Fact named it the best track of 2009; Resident Advisor ranked it 23rd in its list of the best 100 tracks of the 2000s. In 2012, Spin named it the sixth best dubstep track of all time. The Fader called it an "anthem".

A Pitchfork review described it as a "gloriously epic celebration of light and heat". In a review giving the track 4.5 out of 5 stars, Resident Advisor also emphasised its euphoric flavour. Simon Reynolds dismissed the track in harsh terms in a blog post, a view which writers at Fact vociferously opposed.
