= Meaning's Edge =

EP by Djrum
- Released: November 22, 2024
- Genre: Breakbeat, Techno, bass, IDM, ambient
- Length: 32:01
- Label: Houndstooth

Djrum chronology
"Hard to Say" / "Tournesol" (2019)	Meaning's Edge (2024)	Under Tangled Silence (2025)

Singles from Meaning's Edge
- 1. "Codex" Released: 26 September 2024; 2. "Frekm Pt.1" Released: 23 October 2024

Meaning's Edge is an extended play by English electronic music producer Djrum. The EP was released on 22 November 2024 on Houndstooth Records (owned by Fabric).

== Background ==
Aside from collaboration and remix work, Meaning's Edge was Djrum's first release since 2019 (excluding his re-mix of "Ganzfield" by Objekt). Beginning with his 2018 release Portrait with Firewood, Djrum had been using more recorded instrumentation in his music, which continued into the writing of Meaning's Edge.

== Musical style, composition and production ==
As with much of Djrum's previous work, much of the EP's composition was rooted in personal, emotional and introspective themes alongside more harsh rave music styles including complex breakbeats and harsh basses.

Djrum used a wide range of instrumentation on the EP, and made particular use of several types of flute namely the bansuri, shakuhachi and traditional western. Djrum's improvisational approach to musical composition continued on this EP, with both "Frekm, Pt. 1" and "Frekm, Pt. 2" being derived from the same flute improvisational line. In addition to the flute, other live instrumentation included violin, hand drums and chimes. The hand drums in particular were noted for their similarities to Tanzanian singeli music.

Both "Codex" and "Frekm, Pt. 1" are the first track in their respective pairs. Djrum stated that this often arises from his production process as he tends to produce a significant amount of material as he's working which does not always fit into a single track.

== Release, promotion, marketing ==
Lead single "Codex" was released on 26 September 2024 to promote the release of the EP. The track was described as complex and "squirrely", and was received well by critics. The follow-up single "Frekm, Pt.1" was released on 23 October 2024.

The full EP was released on 22 November 2024 as a digital download and 12" Vinyl EP.

== Critical reception ==
Professional ratings
Aggregate scores
Source	Rating
AllMusic	7.3/10
Review scores
Source	Rating
Pitchfork	8.3/10

The EP received favorable reviews from critics, with Philip Sherburne of Pitchfork praising the production standard and influences shown on the record. It was featured as part of the publication's "best new music" category. Rob McCallum of DJ Mag described Meaning's Edge as "intricate and beautiful".

Lead single "Codex" was featured by both DJ Mag and The New York Times as one of the top songs of 2024.

== Track listing ==
All tracks are written by Felix Manuel.

No.	Title	Length
1.	"Codex"	06:46
2.	"Codex, Pt. 2"	01:59
3.	"Crawl"	08:17
4.	"Frekm, Pt. 1"	06:45
5.	"Frekm, Pt.2"	08:12
Total length:		32:01

== Personnel ==
- Felix Manuel (Djrum) – Composition, production, piano and flutes

=== Technical personnel ===
- Mastering – Matt Colton

== Charts ==
Chart (2024)	Peak position
UK Album Downloads (OCC)	15
UK Dance Albums (OCC)	2
