= If the Car Beside You Moves Ahead =

Single by James Blake

from the album Assume Form (Japanese Bonus Tracks)
- Released: 26 January 2018
- Genre: Electronic; glitch pop; experimental
- Length: 4:22
- Label: Polydor
- Songwriter(s): James Blake
- Producer(s): James Blake; Dominic Maker

James Blake singles chronology
"King's Dead" (2018)	"If the Car Beside You Moves Ahead" (2018)	"Don't Miss It" (2018)

"If the Car Beside You Moves Ahead" is a song and non-album single by English electronic music producer and singer-songwriter James Blake. It was written by Blake and produced alongside Dominic Maker of electronic music duo Mount Kimbie. A music video directed by Alexander Brown was released on 25 January 2018 having premiered at his BBC Radio 1 residency and was released as a single the next day.

Musically, the song is a return to Blake's experimental music found in his earlier works, and it received generally positive reviews, most critics praising Blake's return to the style of music from his early career. The song appears as a bonus track on the Japanese deluxe edition of Blake's fourth studio album, Assume Form.

== Composition ==
"If the Car Beside You Moves Ahead" is a song which blends electronic and pop music and also features the experimental, avant-garde and psychedelic sounds found in Blake's early works. Blake's chopped and distorted vocals are used as the track's main instrument, backed by hazy synths, an electronic metronome, and atmospheric noise sampled from Michel Colombier and Pierre Henry's "Jericho Jerk". His vocals become more natural sounding during the lines "Chemical day so I can draw / Conclusions I have come to take as law." Lyrically, the song compares the feeling of driving a car in the slow lane on a motorway or a freeway next to the fast lane, to when you try to compare your existential and social position to others in real life who are personally making more progress; Blake sings "As much as it feels as though you're dead / You're not going backwards". However, the song contains few discernible lyrics save for the song's title, processed .

== Critical reception ==
The song received generally positive reviews upon its release and was commended for returning to the experimental sound found in Blake's early work. Andy Cush of Spin commended the song's chopped vocals, calling them "a welcome reminder that this technique still has the capacity to produce genuine beauty and strangeness." Resident Advisor's Andrew Ryce gave the track a score of 4.4 out of 5, writing that the track "plays to his strengths, combining his soulful voice, cosmic production and haunting hooks until you can't hear where one ends and the other begins." Kevin Lozano, writing for Pitchfork, called the track "steeped in gorgeous effects and head-spinning vocal tricks" but added that "it is lacking in action or drama: it’s a moody, sonic study more than anything else." He concluded that "it has the energy of Blake’s most youthful work, a welcome change of pace in itself." Tshepo Mokoena of Noisey wrote that the track "feels more like CMYK-era Blake. And I'm not complaining."

In a series of mixed reviews by four editors on Fact, the average score for the track was a 5.25 out of 10. John Twells called the song's beat "interesting enough to begin with", but concluded that the song "is another grey slog from an artist whose best work is an ever more distant memory." April Clare Welsh shared similar sentiments, calling the track "a semi-welcome change from the open-hearted minimalism that we have been subjected to in varying degrees" but added that "the pitch-shifting and glitches give it a certain amount of crunch, but at the same time it all feels at odds with the track’s squeaky clean casing, which has been scrubbed within an inch of its life." Chal Ravens was conflicted by the song, writing that "the vocal science feels a bit heavy-handed" and compared Blake's vocals to Anohni's "after all the warbling and pitch-shifting". He concluded stating "I don’t know! My thoughts cannot congeal around it for some reason. He’s a slippery bugger."

PopMatters placed the track at number 25 on their "60 Best Songs of 2018" list and Resident Advisor named it the sixth best song of 2018. On Spin's year-end list, they placed it at number 54.

== Music video ==
A music video for "If the Car Beside You Moves Ahead" was uploaded on YouTube on 25 January 2018 after the song's premiere on BBC Radio 1. Described by some publications as a visualiser, it features various close ups of Blake driving a black 1991 Corvette in a rainy city, interrupted by various streaks of light. Peter Helman of Stereogum compared the video to science fiction franchise Tron. In an interview with Promonews, the video's director Alexander Brown revealed that it was inspired by a YouTube video of a man driving through Moscow which had a "such an incredible quality and smoothness to it". It was shot in Los Angeles, giving off a "Drive/Nightcrawler aesthetic", and the United Kingdom, some of it on the A50 road near Derby. It was shot with a week's worth of footage with Brown's "very basic camera."

== Personnel ==
Credits adapted from Apple Music.

- James Blake — vocals, producer, composer, piano
- Dominic Maker — composer
- Matt Colton — mastering engineer

== Release history ==
Release dates and formats for "If the Car Beside You Moves Ahead"
Region	Date	Format	Label	Ref.
Various	26 January 2018	Digital download; streaming	Columbia; Sony UK	
Japan	27 February 2019	Album bonus track	Universal Music Japan	
