= Maybes EP =

Maybes

EP by Mount Kimbie
- Released: January 2009
- Genre: Post-dubstep
- Length: 15:06
- Label: Hotflush Recordings
- Producer: Dominic Maker, Kai Campos

Mount Kimbie chronology
Maybes (2009)	Sketch on Glass EP (2009)

Maybes is the debut EP by UK electronic duo Mount Kimbie, released in January 2009 through Hotflush Recordings as 12" vinyl and digital download. It received praise from critics.

== Reception ==
Professional ratings
Review scores
Source	Rating
Pitchfork	7.4/10
Resident Advisor	4.5/5 stars

Maybes was met with enthusiastic response. Resident Advisor wrote that "there's plenty of space for flights of imaginative fancy here," and reasoned "that the duo have managed something this accomplished for their debut indicates the probable arrival of a major talent." XLR8R described the work as "deceptively complex, with a sense of floating formlessness akin to the gentler side of '90s-era British IDM". Pitchfork Media wrote that the EP "should be of interest to listeners who find dubstep's pervasive moodiness to be a turn-off" and stated that, along with the group's subsequent Sketch on Glass EP, it contained "character, humor, light chaos, nice sound design, and real melodic imperative".

== Track listing ==
All tracks written by Dominic Maker, Kai Campos.

No.	Title	Length
1.	"Maybes"	3:43
2.	"William"	4:04
3.	"Vertical"	4:07
4.	"Taps"	3:12

== Personnel ==
- Dominic Maker – songwriter, producer
- Kai Campos – songwriter, producer
- Aaron Zimmermann – artwork and design
- Gordon Curtis – artwork and design
- Sam John – mastering
