= Sketch on Glass =

EP by Mount Kimbie
- Released: August 2009
- Genre: Post-dubstep, electronica
- Length: 14:58
- Label: Hotflush Recordings
- Producer: Dominic Maker, Kai Campos

Mount Kimbie chronology
Maybes EP (2009)	Sketch on Glass (2009)	Crooks & Lovers (2010)

Sketch on Glass is an EP by UK electronic duo Mount Kimbie, released in August 2009 through Hotflush Recordings. It received praise from critics.

== Reception ==
Professional ratings
Review scores
Source	Rating
Fact Magazine	(positive)
Pitchfork	7.9/10
Resident Advisor	4.5/5 stars

Resident Advisor noted a number of "brave new directions displayed here" and wrote that the duo "refuse to lean on the midrange bassline or any kind of half-step drum pattern and they never, ever, stop experimenting." In comparison with the duo's Maybes EP, Sketch on Glass was described by Pitchfork Media as "markedly funkier but also feels more self-assured and detailed: The bass is deeper but the sound is lighter and more agile; the plinks and pops-- sorta cute-- really ricochet around in the mix instead of just accenting it; the vocal samples are warped and flattened in weirder ways." XLR8R wrote that in comparison to their previous EP, the work moves "into funkier waters, employing a more colorful and playful palette of sounds. Fact Magazine described it as "another EP of inventiveness and creativity, but this time with more of a focus on bass and groove."

== Track listing ==
All tracks written by Dominic Maker, Kai Campos.

No.	Title	Length
1.	"Sketch on Glass"	4:20
2.	"Serged"	3:31
3.	"50 Mile View"	3:28
4.	"At Least"	3:39

== Personnel ==
- Dominic Maker – writer, producer
- Kai Campos – writer, producer
- Aaron Zimmermann – artwork
- Gordon Curtis – design
