= Barefoot in the Park (song) =

2019 single

Single by James Blake featuring Rosalía

from the album Assume Form
- Language: English; Spanish
- Released: 4 April 2019
- Recorded: September 2018
- Genre: Alternative R&B
- Length: 3:31
- Label: Polydor
- Songwriters: James Blake; Paco Ortega; Rosalía Vila
- Producers: James Blake; Dominic Maker; Dan Foat

James Blake singles chronology
"Lullaby for My Insomniac" (2019)	"Barefoot in the Park" (2019)	"Mulholland" (2019)

Rosalía singles chronology
"Con altura" (2019)	"Barefoot in the Park" (2019)	"Aute Cuture" (2019)

Music video
- "Barefoot in the Park" on YouTube

"Barefoot in the Park" is a song by English electronic music producer and singer-songwriter James Blake featuring Spanish singer and songwriter Rosalía. It was written by Blake, Rosalía and Paco Ortega and produced by Blake, Dominic Maker and Dan Foat. The single was released on 4 April 2019, by Polydor Records, as the fourth single from Blake's fourth studio album Assume Form (2019). It is a Latin-infused ballad which blends Blake's electronic and UK bass style, trap drums and Rosalía's traditional flamenco influences. Inspired by the 1967 film Barefoot in the Park, its romantic lyrics celebrate togetherness.

The song was met with positive reviews, with many commending Rosalía's vocal performance. Commercially, it managed the reach number 40 in Rosalía's native Spain and peaked at number 27 on the US Hot Dance/Electronic Songs. A music video for the single was shared on the single's release date. Both singers have performed the song live on a number of occasions, both solo or in duet.

== Background and recording ==
James Blake was inspired to collaborate with Rosalía after his manager played her debut album Los ángeles to him; in an interview with iTunes, he related that he "honestly hadn't heard anything so vulnerable and raw and devastating in quite a while." Blake subsequently booked spontaneous recording sessions with Rosalía and André 3000 in order to "see what would happen, and the songs that emerged from them." Within the day, Blake and Rosalía had written "two or three things" including "Barefoot in the Park", with Blake commenting that he "loved the sound of [their] voices together." During this session, Rosalía wrote lyrics about love in what Blake called a "very human, and beautiful, and romantic" way. He further commented "when you don't understand the lyrics, it takes on a completely different meaning, and you just hear the romance of the Spanish language in action."

The songwriting process for the song began after Dominic Maker showed Blake a sound pool from 1971 by the then 13-year-old singer and harpist Valerie Armstrong playing the Irish folk song "Fil, fil a rún ó" for RTÉ. Blake consequently decided to have "a couple goes at singing something over it, and [he] ended up with this one phrase that [he and Maker] liked." Because of its brevity, he doubled its length to make the song's chorus. Rosalía added a vocal harmony during her recording session with Blake. Blake took inspiration from the 1967 film Barefoot in the Park for the track, despite never having seen it; nevertheless, he "resonated" with its premise of a "man who is pretty uncomfortable, pretty anxious, pretty uptight, got a stick up his ass, basically, meets this woman and she brings him out of his shell slowly."

== Composition and lyrics ==
"Barefoot in the Park" was written by Blake, Rosalía and Paco Ortega, while its production was handled by the lead artist alongside Maker and Dan Foat. It is a serene Latin-infused ballad duet which features trap drums as well as Rosalía's traditional flamenco influences. Jessica Roiz of Billboard wrote that the song "fuses Blake's soulful electronic and UK bass sounds with Rosalia's alternative Spanish folk rhythms," while Philip Sherburne of Pitchfork noted the song's "tropical IDM beat." Jon Pareles, writing for The New York Times, considered that the single was the only track off Assume Form to feature anything close to "one luminous, fully focused pop chorus [...] despite its minor key and somber descending chords." According to Alexis Petridis of The Guardian, Blake's "naturally lugubrious" voice adds a slight edge of uncertainty to the romantic nature of the track.

In its lyrics, the track celebrates "togetherness." Blake explained several of the song's lyrics exclusively on Genius. Rosalía's verses use imagery of "the sun coming through the clouds and hitting you directly in the eye" to describe love, comparing it to a spiritual experience. Meanwhile, Blake's line "Who needs to pray?" reflects how he "[feels] so fucking satisfied in this situation that [he doesn't] need [his] usual devices of making [himself] feel better," rather than meaning "you don't need to pray." Another verse, "Saturn starts turning off each ring / Sky's locking up I think," is intended to resemble a bar closing, representing how a day with someone who you're "starting to feel a lot for" ends and "you want it to not be over."

== Critical reception ==
"Barefoot in the Park" was met with positive reviews, with Rosalía's vocal performance drawing the most praise. Ryan Keeling of Resident Advisor opined that the song is "a nice example of the creative openness Blake pursues throughout" Assume Form. The Line of Best Fit writer Simon Edwards expressed the same opinion, adding that Rosalía "steals the show." In the same vein, Felix Rowe of Clash wrote that the Spanish singer "adds another dimension" to the track. The Observer's Kitty Empire considered the song "far more pleasing to the ear" than the collaborations with hip hop artists found on the album, describing it as a "humid and haunted thermal," though was somewhat critical of Blake's vocal performance which she claimed "has started resembling that of Chris Martin from Coldplay."

Spin's Andy Beta described "Barefoot in the Park" as a "romantic [...] speedball of minor-key melancholia and flying sparks." In his review of Assume Form for Stereogum, James Rettig wrote that Rosalía "wields an incredible power" on the track, and noted that it "could even get radio play if given the right push." Wren Graves of Consequence of Sound applauded Rosalía's vocal performance, describing it as "like sunlight on cobwebs," and added that "Blake abandons all melodic restraint" before concluding that the song "gushes with loveliness." One less enthusiastic review came from Pitchfork editor Philip Sherburne, who found the song's "tropical IDM beat and rising-and-falling melody [...] largely forgettable," though applauded Rosalía's "breathy warble" as its "best feature."

== Music video ==
A music video for "Barefoot in the Park" premiered on 4 April 2019. It was directed by Diana Kunst and Mau Morgó. The video opens with a shot of a young boy and girl standing in front of two cars that have been set ablaze after a collision. The two go their separate ways, with Blake observing the boy's journey and Rosalía the girl's at a distance. The children continue to walk, this time older, as their younger selves turn to dust. The boy later disintegrates as he looks at the sky. Blake and Rosalía are then seen driving, intertwined with surreal shots of sky, and the two briefly acknowledge each other. The video ends with the opening shot, though this time in an evening setting.

== Live performances ==
Blake performed seven tracks from Assume Form including "Barefoot in the Park" on 22 May 2019 at KCRW's Annenberg Performance Studio in Santa Monica, California. He also performed it solo at the Primavera Sound festival in Barcelona during his set on 1 June. However, during her performance that day at the same festival, Rosalía invited Blake onstage to sing the duet together. The Spanish artist has also performed the track alone at her acclaimed sets on the third day of the Glastonbury Festival 2019 and at Somerset House on 16 July.

== Credits and personnel ==
Credits adapted from Tidal.

Personnel

- James Blake – producer, composer, lyricist, co-mixer, piano, programming, synthesizer, vocals
- Rosalía Vila – composer, lyricist, vocals
- Dan Foat – producer (also exec.)
- Dominic Maker – producer (also add.), programming
- Paco Ortega – composer, lyricist
- Eric Eylands – assistant recording engineer
- John Armstrong – assistant recording engineer
- Nathan Boddy – co-mixer

== Charts ==
Chart performance for "Barefoot in the Park"
Chart (2019)	Peak position
Belgium (Ultratip Bubbling Under Flanders)	11
Belgium (Ultratip Bubbling Under Wallonia)	45
Spain (Promusicae)	40
US Hot Dance/Electronic Songs (Billboard)	27
