= Assume Form =

Studio album by James Blake
- Released: 18 January 2019
- Recorded: 2017–2018
- Studio: Conway (Hollywood, California); Groove Masters (Santa Monica, California); United (Hollywood, California)
- Genre: Pop; electropop
- Length: 48:08
- Label: Polydor
- Producer: Allen Ritter; Dre Moon; James Blake; Metro Boomin; Wavey

James Blake chronology
The Colour in Anything (2016)	Assume Form (2019)	Before (2020)

Singles from Assume Form
- 1. "Don't Miss It" Released: 4 June 2018; 2. "Mile High" Released: 17 January 2019; 3. "Lullaby for My Insomniac" Released: 17 January 2019; 4. "Barefoot in the Park" Released: 4 April 2019; 5. "Mulholland" Released: 26 April 2019

Assume Form is the fourth studio album by English singer-songwriter James Blake. It was released on 18 January 2019 by Polydor Records. Critics described the album as having a more upbeat sound than Blake's prior work, especially his previous album, The Colour in Anything (2016). The album, which combines pop and electropop, and elements of hip-hop and R&B, features guest vocal appearances by Travis Scott, Moses Sumney, Rosalía, and André 3000, as well as contributions from producer Metro Boomin.

The lead single "Don't Miss It" was released on 4 June 2018 and two further singles, "Mile High" and "Lullaby for My Insomniac" followed in January. Upon the album's release, Assume Form received praise from critics for its more upbeat sound, romanticism and production. The album was nominated for Best Alternative Music Album at the 62nd Annual Grammy Awards.

== Background and recording ==
In 2016, James Blake collaborated with Beyoncé on the album Lemonade. Following this, he stated that he "always felt, or at least for a long time, that [his] position in music was to bubble under mainstream [...] [and] be kind of like a musician's musician". Blake subsequently worked with numerous hip-hop and electronic artists—including Jay-Z on the album 4:44; Kendrick Lamar on the track "Element"; Mount Kimbie the album Love What Survives; Oneohtrix Point Never on the album Age Of; and Travis Scott on the track "Stop Trying to Be God".

In May 2017, Blake revealed that he had already written new music such as "hip-hop things" and "collaborative productions and beats" but added that he was unsure whether they would be stand-alone singles or projects. He booked spontaneous sessions with Rosalía and André 3000, which brought about André 3000's EP Look Ma No Hands, as well as the tracks "Barefoot in the Park" and "Where's the Catch?", both tracks from Assume Form. Blake was inspired to collaborate with Rosalía after hearing her debut record Los Ángeles, and stated that he "honestly hadn’t heard anything so vulnerable and raw and devastating in quite a while." He subsequently invited her to the studio and made "two or three things" and added that he "loved the sound of our voices together." He also performed in the studio with Travis Scott after collaborating on his album Astroworld. He described the session as unusual, saying, "[Scott] had just released Astroworld, which is like banger after banger, and then he comes and does this really vulnerable, sweet love song [Mile High]." The recording session with Moses Sumney and Metro Boomin for "Tell Them" was described as a "vulnerable moment" by Blake.

== Music and lyrics ==
Assume Form has been described as a pop and electropop with elements of hip-hop and R&B, and as significantly more upbeat than his previous records, numerous publications contrasting it with the "utterly downcast" The Colour in Anything. Blake's vocals range from deeper tones to a falsetto and the record also features manipulated vocals and a "self-choir". Variations on a hip hop beat featured on the track "Can't Believe the Way We Flow", which Blake performed several times in late 2017, appears on various tracks off the record. Its lyrics mainly allude to Blake's relationship with his girlfriend Jameela Jamil and their life in Los Angeles. Blake told Dazed that the album was about his current feelings, referring to his sentiments towards his girlfriend, as a reaction to when online music magazine Pitchfork described Assume Form's lead single "Don't Miss It" as "sad boy music", and explained that "on this record, I'm just talking about how I feel now, and I will continue to write about how I feel, or sometimes I won't talk about how I feel, but I'll fucking damn well choose when I do and when I don't – without feeling like because I'm a man I shouldn't do that." In an interview with Exclaim!, Blake said, "I wanted to try and say the thing I mean, which is hard. It's scary to do that sometimes. I think the fear kept me from doing that before."

== Promotion and release ==
In December 2018, Blake announced a tour of North America beginning in Atlanta in February 2019 and ending in Los Angeles the following month. People who had purchased tickets for the North America tour also received a copy of his forthcoming album. Later that month, Blake teased new material with American rapper and multi-instrumentalist André 3000 during a show in Brooklyn.

On 3 January 2019, a French Amazon pre-order page of the album surfaced online, including details such as its release date, track listing, and featured artists, thus revealing that the single "Don't Miss It", which was released on 4 June 2018, was a track from the album. However, both "Vincent", released in late 2017, and "If the Car Beside You Moves Ahead", released earlier in 2018 were absent from the track listing. Nevertheless, there had been speculation that the leak was "an elaborate fake".

Soon after, LED and projection billboards appeared in London and New York promoting the album and revealing a URL for assumeform.com. The site featured a short sample of minimal, ambient music, revealed by Shazam to be "Lullaby for My Insomniac", and an animated graphic featuring the album title. A sign in tag and a video asking a series of questions, taken from the lyrics to the title track, were later added to the site. On 10 January, promotional posters for the album appeared on the London Underground, revealing the album' cover art and officially confirming a release date of 18 January 2019 and guest appearances from André 3000, Travis Scott, Moses Sumney, Metro Boomin and Rosalía. Both the track listing and the features were confirmed on Blake's official Instagram account.

On 17 January, only twelve hours prior to the album's release, Blake released the track "Mile High" featuring Travis Scott and Metro Boomin after having premiered it on Zane Lowe's Beats 1 show. Hours later, a third single, "Lullaby for My Insomniac", was released. The track "Barefoot in the Park" was released as a single on 4 April, accompanied by a music video. The song "Mulholland", which is included on the vinyl version of Assume Form, was released on 26 April as a single.

== Critical reception ==
Assume Form ratings
Aggregate scores
Source	Rating
AnyDecentMusic?	7.4/10
Metacritic	80/100
Review scores
Source	Rating
AllMusic	3.5/5 stars
The A.V. Club	B
The Daily Telegraph	5/5 stars
Entertainment Weekly	A−
The Guardian	4/5 stars
The Independent	5/5 stars
Mojo	4/5 stars
NME	5/5 stars
Pitchfork	5.8/10
Q	4/5 stars

Assume Form was met with generally positive reviews. At Metacritic, which assigns a rating out of 100 to reviews from professional publications, the album received a weighted average score of 80, based on 31 reviews. Aggregator AnyDecentMusic? gave it 7.4 out of 10, based on their assessment of the critical consensus.

Alexis Petridis of The Guardian praised Blake for "adding fresh, noticeably brighter colours to his palette" and wrote that "it is immensely pleasing to witness an artist who seemed to be at a dead end now moving forward." Neil McCormick of The Daily Telegraph gave the album a perfect score, calling it Blake's "most fully-realised album to date" and "dizzyingly romantic". Conversely, Spencer Kornhaber of The Atlantic wrote that though "as a headphones experience, Assume Form does deliver the expected shivers," he concluded that the album's main flaw was "in over-explaining his art".

In a positive A− review, Wren Graves of Consequence called the album a "remarkable achievement" and commended Blake as "one of the most original songwriters of his generation." Jon Pareles wrote that the album "opens into haunted, rewarding depths" in a positive review for The New York Times. Stereogum's James Rettig commended the album's features and also praised its production, writing that though "Blake's songs occasionally bleed together, [...] here he avoids that by grounding each one in these unique twists of form." Tom Connick of NME gave the album the site's first five-star rating of 2019, hailing Blake as "one of the world's greatest producers [...], a brilliant songwriter and emotive lyricist." Helen Brown echoed these sentiments in her review for The Independent, writing that "his trademark intelligence, honesty and pin-drop production remain intact" and described the album as "a bubble of personal bliss in an ocean full of plastic."

Fred Thomas was more reserved in his assessment for AllMusic, stating that "In some ways it's hard not to miss that trademark ache and downcast minimalism" but added that the record "represents artistic development and a strike at emotional vulnerability from a talent who could have tread well-known territory indefinitely" and concluding that "the shifting perspectives of Assume Form are refreshing." Andy Beta in a review for Spin deemed the album "Blake's most coherent statement to date" and wrote that "he doubles down on his melancholy, but also makes room for love." Alex Suskind of Entertainment Weekly wrote in a positive review that "On his new album Assume Form, Blake abandons that piercing despair — though not his emotional vulnerability — by choosing romance over sorrow."

In a more negative review, Philip Sherburne of Pitchfork criticized the album's "suffocating seriousness" for bogging down "genuine moments of levity and love." However, Blake stated in response that he thinks "they might still be a bit upset that I called them out for their toxic masculinity," referring to when he criticized the site for calling his track "Don't Miss It" "sad boy" music.

=== Year-end lists ===
Select year-end rankings of Assume Form
Critic/Publication	List	Rank	Ref.
Afisha Daily (Russia)	The Best Foreign Albums of 2019	3	
Clash	Clash Albums of the Year 2019	18	
Complex	The Best Albums of 2019	27	
The Guardian	The 50 Best Albums of 2019	31	
The Independent	The 50 Best Albums of 2019	8	
NME	The 50 Best Albums of 2019	22	
Sputnikmusic	Staff's Top 50 Albums of 2019	40	
Time	The 10 Best Albums of 2019	10	

=== Industry awards ===
Awards and nominations for Assume Form
Year	Ceremony	Category	Result	Ref.
2020	Grammy Awards	Best Alternative Music Album	Nominated	

== Commercial performance ==
Assume Form debuted at number 21 on the Billboard 200 and number one on the Top Dance/Electronic Albums chart in the United States with 22,000 equivalent album units, including 9,000 from traditional album sales. The album became Blake's highest-charting album on Billboard, and his third chart-topping album by genre. In addition, all tracks from the album charted on the Hot Dance/Electronic Songs chart. Blake also earned his highest-charting album in the United Kingdom, reaching number 6 and selling 6,226 equivalent album units, including 1,344 CD units.

== Track listing ==
Assume Form track listing
No.	Title	Writer(s)	Producer(s)	Length
1.	"Assume Form"	James Litherland	James Blake; Dominic Maker^{[b]}	4:49
2.	"Mile High" (featuring Travis Scott and Metro Boomin)	Litherland; Jacques Webster II; Leland Wayne	James Blake; Metro Boomin; Dre Moon; Wavy	3:13
3.	"Tell Them" (featuring Moses Sumney and Metro Boomin)	Litherland; Moses Sumney; Wayne; Allen Ritter	James Blake; Metro Boomin; Dre Moon; Ritter; Maker^{[b]}; Jameela Jamil^{[b]}	3:28
4.	"Into the Red"	Litherland	James Blake; Maker^{[a]}; Jamil^{[b]}	4:17
5.	"Barefoot in the Park" (featuring Rosalía)	Litherland; Rosalía Tobella; Paco Ortega	James Blake; Maker^{[b]}	3:31
6.	"Can't Believe the Way We Flow"	Litherland; Roger Joyce; Victoria Pike; Teddy Randazzo	James Blake; Maker^{[a]}; Daniel Lopatin^{[b]}	4:27
7.	"Are You in Love?"	Litherland	James Blake; Jamil^{[b]}	3:17
8.	"Where's the Catch?" (featuring André 3000)	Litherland; André Benjamin	James Blake; Maker^{[a]}	4:36
9.	"I'll Come Too"	Litherland; Bruno Nicolai	James Blake; Maker^{[a]}; Jamil^{[b]}	3:42
10.	"Power On"	Litherland	James Blake; Maker^{[a]}; Jamil^{[b]}	4:06
11.	"Don't Miss It"	Litherland	James Blake; Maker^{[a]}	4:59
12.	"Lullaby for My Insomniac"	Litherland	James Blake	3:43
Total length:				48:08

Japan bonus tracks
No.	Title	Writer(s)	Producer(s)	Length
13.	"Vincent" (Don McLean cover)	Don McLean	Ed Freeman	5:12
14.	"If the Car Beside You Moves Ahead"	Litherland	James Blake; Maker^{[a]}	4:23
Total length:				57:54

LP bonus track
No.	Title	Writer(s)	Producer(s)	Length
1.	"Mulholland" (Side D, Track 3; track 12 on digital version)	Litherland	James Blake	3:11

Notes

- ^{^[a]} signifies a co-producer
- ^{^[b]} signifies an additional producer

Sample credits

- "Assume Form" contains a sample from "Depression", written by Adam Tench, and performed by Rage Almighty.
- "Barefoot in the Park" contains a sample from "Fíl a Run Ó", performed by Valerie Armstrong, and an interpolation of "Entre Dos Puertos (Alegrías)", written by Paco Ortega and performed by Niña Pastori.
- "Can't Believe the Way We Flow" contains a sample from "It Feels So Good to Be Loved So Bad", written by Teddy Randazzo, and performed by The Manhattans.
- "Where's the Catch?" contains a sample from "Fire", written and performed by Sister Irene O'Connor.
- "I'll Come Too" contains a sample from "La Contessa, Incontro", written and performed by Bruno Nicolai.

== Personnel ==
Credits adapted from official liner notes.

=== Musicians ===
- James Blake – production, vocals
- Dominic Maker – additional production (tracks 1, 3, 5), co-production (tracks 4, 6, 8–11)
- Jameela Jamil – additional arrangement (tracks 1, 6), additional production (tracks 3, 4, 7, 9, 10)
- Travis Scott – featured vocals (track 2)
- Metro Boomin – production (tracks 2, 3)
- Dre Moon – production (tracks 2, 3)
- Wavy – production (track 2)
- Moses Sumney – featured vocals (track 3)
- Allen Ritter – production (track 3)
- Peter Lee Johnson – arrangement (track 3)
- Rosalía – additional percussion (track 3), featured vocals (track 5)
- Kalim Patel – additional arrangement (tracks 5, 9)
- Daniel Lopatin – additional production (track 6), additional keyboards (track 8)
- André 3000 – featured vocals (track 8)

=== Technical ===
- Nathan Boddy – mixing, mastering
- James Blake – mixing
- Joshua Smith – recording engineer (tracks 1, 3–11, 13)
- Ethan Stevens – recording engineer (tracks 2, 3, 10)
- Jason Lader – recording engineer (track 12)

=== Design ===
- Reed Bennett – design
- Bryan Rivera – design
- Allen Chiu – design
- Amanda Charchian – photography
- Meagan Judkins – visual producer

== Charts ==
=== Weekly charts ===
Chart performance for Assume Form
Chart (2019)	Peak position
Australian Albums (ARIA)	22
Austrian Albums (Ö3 Austria)	16
Belgian Albums (Ultratop Flanders)	4
Belgian Albums (Ultratop Wallonia)	97
Canadian Albums (Billboard)	8
Danish Albums (Hitlisten)	7
Dutch Albums (Album Top 100)	17
French Albums (SNEP)	60
German Albums (Offizielle Top 100)	27
Irish Albums (IRMA)	18
Italian Albums (FIMI)	89
Latvian Albums (LAIPA)	5
Lithuanian Albums (AGATA)	4
New Zealand Albums (RMNZ)	21
Norwegian Albums (VG-lista)	21
Scottish Albums (OCC)	45
Spanish Albums (Promusicae)	60
Swedish Albums (Sverigetopplistan)	21
Swiss Albums (Schweizer Hitparade)	9
UK Albums (OCC)	6
US Billboard 200	21
US Top Dance Albums (Billboard)	1

=== Year-end charts ===
2019 year-end chart performance for Assume Form
Chart (2019)	Position
Belgian Albums (Ultratop Flanders)	194
US Top Dance/Electronic Albums (Billboard)	25

== Release history ==
Release history and formats for Assume Form
Region	Date	Label(s)	Format(s)	Ref.
Various	18 January 2019	Polydor	Digital download; streaming; CD; cassette	
Japan	27 February 2019	Universal Music Japan	CD	
Various	10 May 2019	Polydor	LP	
