= Stubborn Heart =

British electronic soul duo

- Origin: London and Oxford, England
- Genres: Electronic soul, post-dubstep
- Years active: 2010–present
- Label: One Little Independent Records
- Members: Luca Santucci; Ben Fitzgerald
- Website: stubbornheart.bandcamp.com

Stubborn Heart is a British electronic soul music duo consisting of Luca Santucci (vocals) and Ben Fitzgerald (production).

The pair actually claim to be part of a longer lineage than the garage-dubstep continuum, calling what they do "electronic soul from the heart" and citing influences from the '60s (Stubborn Heart is an old northern soul track) and '80s synth-pop, as well as '90s techno, house and garage. Comparisons have been drawn with The XX, SBTRKT, My Computer, Mount Kimbie, James Blake & Four Tet. In a recent review by the BBC, elements of Stubborn Heart's musical style were likened to Art of Noise & Aphex Twin.

Having signed to One Little Indian Records in mid-2012, Stubborn Heart's self-titled debut has gained coverage from the likes of NME, The Guardian as well as BBC 6Music.

The duo's self-titled debut album was released on Monday, 5 November 2012. In the lead up to album's release, The Guardian featured Stubborn Heart as their band of the day. Also, the track from the album, 'Starting Block' has also been elected BBC 6Music breakfast's track of the week. The visual stream of the album was featured as an exclusive on NME.com on Wednesday, 31 October.

== Discography ==
=== Albums ===
- Made of Static (2021)
- Stubborn Heart (2012)

=== EPs ===
- Penetrate (2013)
- Better Than This (2013)
- Starting Block (2012)
- Need Someone (2012)
