= Under Tangled Silence =

Studio album by Djrum
- Released: April 25, 2025
- Genres: Electronic, IDM
- Length: 1:02:14
- Label: Houndstooth

Djrum chronology
Meaning's Edge (2024)	Under Tangled Silence (2025)	I Wander EP (2026)

Singles from Under Tangled Silence
- 1. "A Tune for Us" Released: 22 January 2025; 2. "Three Foxes Chasing Each Other" Released: 26 February 2025

Under Tangled Silence is the third full length studio album by English electronic music producer Djrum. The album was released on 25 April 2025 as a digital download as well as a double 12" LP.

== Background ==
The album was composed and recorded over a period of 8 years, beginning before Djrum's previous album Portrait With Firewood was released, when he composed the piano for "Galaxy of Silence". During the production period, the power supply to Djrum's laptop overheated, causing damage to the motherboard and significant data loss. This included a large number of Ableton sessions for the project. Following what he referred to as a "mourning period", Djrum decided to re-create the album almost from scratch.

== Musical style, composition and production ==
The album's themes were inspired by a quote from Patti Smith, "We go through life. We shed our skins. We become ourselves". The album was described to span a wide range of genres including ambient, dancehall and jungle.

A significant number of the instruments used were recorded in the studio by Djrum (and featuring cellist Zosia Jagodzinska) rather than the typical sampling approach used in electronic music. Having experience with playing piano most of his life, Djrum played all of the piano parts on the record. This included on "Waxcap", a song which started out as a jazz-inspired improvisation. Other live instruments recorded by Djrum on the album include harp, percussion and mbira.

== Release, promotion, marketing ==
In January 2025, Djrum released the single "A Tune for Us". The track was noted for its subtle approach and atmospheric tone. The second single released to promote the album was "Three Foxes Chasing Each Other" in March 2025. This track was notably faster and more aggressive than the former single, influenced by high-tempo rave subgenres including gabber and breakcore.

The album was released on 25 April 2025 as a digital download and double gatefold vinyl LP.

== Touring ==
In support of the album's release, Djrum announced a tour comprising 7 dates across Europe. Soon after, this tour was expanded to 32 dates across the UK, Europe and United States.

== Critical reception ==
Professional ratings
Review scores
Source	Rating
Pitchfork	8.7/10
Ondarock	7.5/10

Critics praised the release, with Pitchfork praising the arrangements and structures of the tracks, deviating from typical dance music styles.

The improvisational approach used by Djrum on the album was praised by critics, noting its impact on the narrative of the album.

== Track listing ==
No.	Title	Length
1.	"A Tune for Us"	5:53
2.	"Waxcap"	5:10
3.	"Unweaving"	3:22
4.	"L'Ancienne"	5:20
5.	"Hold"	1:51
6.	"Galaxy in Silence"	5:58
7.	"Reprise" (Featuring Zosia Jagodzinska)	2:36
8.	"Three Foxes Chasing Each Other"	7:13
9.	"Let Me"	7:22
10.	"Out Of Dust"	6:21
11.	"Sycamore"	11:08
Total length:		1:02:14

== Personnel ==
- Felix Manuel (Djrum) – production, piano, percussion, harp, mbira

=== Additional musicians ===
- Zosia Jagodzinska – Cello, additional writing
- Willow and Rudy Manuel – vocals on "Three Foxes Chasing Each Other"

=== Technical personnel ===
- Matt Colton – Mastering

== Charts ==
Chart (2025)	Peak position
UK Album Downloads (Official Charts)	9
UK Dance Albums (Official Charts)	1
