= Can't Believe the Way We Flow =

Song by James Blake

from the album Assume Form
- Released: 18 January 2019
- Genre: Electro-soul
- Length: 4:27
- Label: Polydor
- Songwriters: James Blake; Roger Joyce; Victoria Pike; Teddy Randazzo
- Producer: James Blake

Music video
- "Can't Believe the Way We Flow" on YouTube

"Can't Believe the Way We Flow" is a song by English electronic music producer and singer-songwriter James Blake from his fourth studio album, Assume Form. It was written by Blake and is based around a sample of "It Feels So Good to Be Loved So Bad", written by Roger Joyce, Victoria Pike and Teddy Randazzo, and performed by The Manhattans.

== Production ==
During the "Verified" segment interview with Genius, Blake revealed the process of creating the song:

"The point at which we made this song in this record was a turning point in the sense that I realized that I could make a happier album. That actually, the way I felt now, however it was I was feeling, needed to be the way the record sounded. This song was particularly pivotal in how the record ended up for me."

About the "It Feels So Good to Be Loved So Bad" sample, Blake revealed that it "brought so many ideas to the table", saying that as soon as Dominic Maker brought and played it, the mood of the session changed and Blake said that he "had to get on it".

== Critical reception ==
Upon the release of Assume Form, "Can't Believe the Way We Flow" was met with favourable reviews. Brian Howe of The A.V. Club called it the highlight track of the album, saying that "[the song] recalls the Blake of yore, but instead of scissoring sideways through time, he contents himself with cutting it into lacy symmetries, like a child making paper snowflakes—just an elegant whir, the vocal floating atop it with open-hearted emotion." Fred Thomas of AllMusic described the track as "standing blissfully awestruck at the brilliance of true love." Comparing it to "It Feels So Good to Be Loved So Bad", Alexis Petridis of The Guardian called it "a blissful, lovely update of the sound that emerged" while saying that "practitioners of soft 70s soul keyed into the sleepy, small-hours feel of doo-wop ballads" about the latter track. Writing for The Independent, Helen Brown compared the song melodically to Etta James' "I'd Rather Go Blind", and described it as "the sonic sky around it fills with doo-wop syllables that glow like paper lanterns."

== Music video ==
The accompanying music video for "Can't Believe the Way We Flow", directed by Frank Lebon, was released on 7 August 2019. The video features a montage of scenes between thirty real-life couples living in London and highlights the highs and lows of relationships.

Lebon was nominated for the Best Editing award for the video at the 2020 MTV Video Music Awards.

== Personnel ==
Credits adapted from Tidal.

- James Blake – vocals, production, synthesizer, piano, mixing, programming
- John Armstrong – recording engineer assistance
- Nathan Boddy – mixing
- Dominic Maker – co-production, programming
- Eric Eylands – recording engineer assistance

== Charts ==
Chart (2019)	Peak position
US Hot Dance/Electronic Songs (Billboard)	33
