= Still Slipping Vol. 1 =

Mixtape by Joy Orbison
- Released: 13 August 2021
- Genre: Electronic
- Length: 46:16
- Label: XL
- Producer: Joy Orbison

Joy Orbison chronology
Slipping (2019)	Still Slipping Vol. 1 (2021)

Still Slipping Vol. 1 is the debut mixtape by English musician, DJ, and record producer Peter O'Grady under the pseudonym Joy Orbison. It was released on 13 August 2021 through XL Recordings. It topped the UK Dance Albums Chart. It received generally favorable reviews from critics.

== Background ==
Still Slipping Vol. 1 was created during the COVID-19 lockdowns. It includes guest appearances from Herron, James Massiah, Bathe, Léa Sen, Edna, Goya Gumbani, and Tyson, as well as voice notes from Joy Orbison's family members. The mixtape's cover art is a photograph of his cousin Leighann. No singles were released from the mixtape. He stated, "I almost see the whole thing as one song, and that's why I didn't really want any of the music to be listened to on its own."

== Critical reception ==
Professional ratings
Aggregate scores
Source	Rating
Metacritic	78/100
Review scores
Source	Rating
AllMusic	4/5 stars
Beats Per Minute	72%
Crack	8/10
The Guardian	3/5 stars
Loud and Quiet	7/10
Pitchfork	7.8/10

According to the review aggregator Metacritic, Still Slipping Vol. 1 received "generally favorable reviews" based on a weighted average score of 78 out of 100 from 6 critic scores.

Tayyab Amin of The Guardian stated, "Shades of ambient and electronica are mixed in with Joy Orbison's slinky, slick brand of house, garage and techno, and the array of guest singers, poets and rappers sharpen the record's most potent moments." Paul Simpson of AllMusic commented that "The beats are more detailed and less heavy than on Joy's singles, and the atmospheric elements and broken textures recall the off-kilter haziness of Actress." Conor Lochrie of Beats Per Minute called the mixtape "a fiercely nostalgic collection, the air heavy with melancholy" and "a snapshot of nocturnal notes and quiet moments, laden with pensiveness."

Still Slipping Vol. 1 was nominated for the Best Independent EP/Mixtape award at the 2022 AIM Independent Music Awards.

=== Accolades ===
Year-end lists for Still Slipping Vol. 1
Publication	List	Rank	Ref.
Clash	Clash Albums of the Year 2021	10	
The Quietus	Quietus Albums of the Year 2021	26	
Slant Magazine	The 10 Best Electronic Albums of 2021	—	

== Track listing ==
Still Slipping Vol. 1 track listing
No.	Title	Writer(s)	Length
1.	"W/ Dad & Frankie"	Joy Orbison	2:34
2.	"Sparko" (featuring Herron)	Orbison; Sam Lewis	2:15
3.	"Swag w/ Kav" (featuring James Massiah and Bathe)	Orbison; James Massiah; Devin C. Hobdy	4:04
4.	"Better" (featuring Léa Sen)	Orbison; Léa Sen	5:01
5.	"Bernard?"	Orbison	3:43
6.	"Runnersz"	Orbison; Mabel McVey; Brian Kennedy; Thomas Hull	2:20
7.	"'Rraine" (featuring Edna)	Orbison; Ellie Rose Davies	3:50
8.	"Glorious Amateurs"	Orbison	3:19
9.	"S Gets Jaded"	Orbison	1:20
10.	"Froth Sipping"	Orbison	3:14
11.	"Layer 6"	Orbison	4:09
12.	"In Drink"	Orbison	2:55
13.	"Playground" (featuring Goya Gumbani)	Orbison; Goya Gumbani	2:57
14.	"Born Slipping" (featuring Tyson)	Orbison; Tyson McVey	4:32
Total length:			46:16

== Personnel ==
Credits adapted from liner notes.

- Joy Orbison – vocals (14), production, direction, mixing
- Sharlene Hector – vocals (2)
- Hal Ritson – vocal production (2), additional programming (2), sample recreation (6)
- James Massiah – vocals (3)
- Bathe – vocals (3)
- Léa Sen – vocals (4)
- Tommy Wallwork – engineering (4)
- Lexxx – mixing (4)
- Richard Adlam – sample recreation (6)
- Tita Lau – vocals (6)
- Edna – vocals (7)
- Goya Gumbani – vocals (13)
- Tyson – vocals (14)
- William Aspden – executive production
- Matt Colton – mastering
- Jake Simmonds – design
- Emma Toma – photography
- Rosie Marks – photography

== Charts ==
Chart performance for Still Slipping Vol. 1
Chart (2021)	Peak position
Scottish Albums (OCC)	68
UK Albums (OCC)	92
UK Dance Albums (OCC)	1
UK Independent Albums (OCC)	4
