= Crooks & Lovers =

Studio album by Mount Kimbie
- Released: 19 July 2010
- Genre: Post-dubstep
- Length: 35:37
- Label: Hotflush Recordings
- Producers: Dominic Maker, Kai Campos

Mount Kimbie chronology
| Sketch on Glass (2009) | Crooks & Lovers (2010) | Cold Spring Fault Less Youth (2013) |

Crooks & Lovers is the first studio album by Mount Kimbie. It was released on Hotflush Recordings on 19 July 2010. It received critical acclaim, and was included in the year end lists of several publications.

== Background ==
The duo used a mixture of field recordings, samples and live instrumentation to create the album. Campos stated "we don’t record for a certain purpose, or with a motive, it's more to see what comes out of it... it's never the noises you think are going to work that do, which keeps it interesting." Maker stated of the recording:

It’s been a very gradual process, and we’ve been playing live a lot over the past few months, so it’s been all about taking ideas and working on them between shows… Constructing the live set was really helpful in terms of actually finishing off ideas. We slowly realised that if something sounds good at the time, don’t sit there and overproduce it for weeks and weeks – there’s no need. Doing it live really helps with that."

The first single from Crooks & Lovers was "Mayor / Would Know". It was released on 12" vinyl and digital. The video for "Would Know" was directed by Tyrone Lebon. The Blind Night Errand EP was released on 29 November 2010 on 12" vinyl and digital download. The EP included the song "Before I Move Off" and also includes an alternate version of "William" remixed by Mount Kimbie themselves, alongside a live recording of "Maybes" taken from a set at Berghain in Berlin. The Carbonated EP is the last release derived from material from the Crooks & Lovers album, and includes remixes of the title track by Airhead and Peter Van Hoesen. B-sides include "Baves Chords", produced at the same time as the Maybes EP, and "Flux", written for the Carbonated EP. The video was again directed by Tyrone Lebon.

== Critical reception ==
Professional ratings
Aggregate scores
| Source | Rating |
|---|---|
| AnyDecentMusic? | 7.8/10 |
Review scores
| Source | Rating |
| AllMusic | 4/5 stars |
| Clash | 8/10 |
| DIY | 5/10 |
| Drowned in Sound | 9/10 |
| MusicOMH | 4/5 stars |
| NME | 8/10 |
| Pitchfork | 8.0/10 |
| Resident Advisor | 4.0/5 |
| Uncut | 4/5 stars |
| Vice | 10/10 |

The album received positive reviews from critics. AllMusic called it "a near perfect, small wonder of post-dubstep bliss." Vice awarded it 10/10, describing the record as one which "stands out as something genuinely special", and NME placed it at number fifty-six in their top Seventy Albums of 2010. Drowned in Sound described the record as "yet another indefinable beast, one that seems to take real joy in refusing to bow to expectations, and avoids conventional song structures in favour of hazy, dreamlike composition" and "certainly a contender for album of the year" David Stubbs of BBC described Crooks & Lovers as "an album of abrupt changes and paradoxes, at once organic and heavily processed, drowsy and yet with moments of eyes-on-stalks urgency, acoustically sweet and electrically charged. It's akin to gently drifting in and out of consciousness on a bus trip, only to be sporadically jolted back into consciousness." Pitchfork called it "a beautiful, small, and clever album."

By the end of 2010, Crooks & Lovers had been included in over 30 Best of 2010 lists. The album was among the 12 shortlisted for the Neptune Music Prize in 2010, and was also nominated for The Guardian 's 'First Album Award' in the same year. Crooks & Lovers was ranked at number 56 on NME's "Albums of 2010" list.

== Track listing ==
| No. | Title | Length |
|---|---|---|
| 1. | "Tunnelvision" | 1:50 |
| 2. | "Would Know" | 3:17 |
| 3. | "Before I Move Off" | 4:11 |
| 4. | "Blind Night Errand" | 3:23 |
| 5. | "Adriatic" | 1:28 |
| 6. | "Carbonated" | 4:20 |
| 7. | "Ruby" | 4:05 |
| 8. | "Ode to Bear" | 4:02 |
| 9. | "Field" | 3:05 |
| 10. | "Mayor" | 4:02 |
| 11. | "Between Time" | 1:54 |
| Total length: | | 35:37 |

== Personnel ==
- Dominic Maker – songwriting, producer
- Kai Campos – songwriting, producer
- Gordon Curtis – design
- Sam John – mastering
- Tyrone Lebon – photography

== Charts ==
| Chart (2010) | Peak position |
|---|---|
| Belgian Albums (Ultratop Flanders) | 88 |
| UK Dance Albums (Official Charts) | 11 |
| UK Independent Albums (Official Charts) | 24 |
