= Sepalcure =

American musical duo

- Origin: Brooklyn, New York, U.S.
- Genres: Future garage, Post-dubstep, IDM
- Years active: 2011–present
- Labels: Hotflush
- Members: Travis Stewart; Praveen Sharma
- Website: sepalcure.com

Sepalcure is a musical collaboration between Travis Stewart (better known as Machinedrum) and Praveen Sharma (better known as Braille). Their self-titled debut album, Sepalcure, was released in 2011 on the Hotflush Recordings label.

== Discography ==
- Love Pressure (EP) (2010), Hotflush Recordings
- Fleur (EP) (2011), Hotflush Recordings
- Sepalcure (2011), Hotflush Recordings
- Make You (EP) (2013), Hotflush Recordings
- Fight for Us (EP) (2015), Hotflush Recordings
- Folding Time (2016), Hotflush Recordings
