= Scuba (musician) =

British electronic musician (born 1979)

- Also known as: SCB
- Origin: UK
- Genres: Dubstep; house; techno; bass; future garage
- Years active: 2003–present
- Labels: Hotflush; Ostgut Ton; PIAS; AUS
- Members: Paul Rose
- Website: scubaofficial.io

Paul Rose (born 30 June 1979), usually known as Scuba (also known by his SCB alias), is a British electronic musician, podcaster, and critic, based between London and Palma de Mallorca. Described as 'one of dance music's most inventive producers', he has released four albums, numerous singles and EPs, and a handful of compilation and mix albums. His style has been described as dubstep with a later 'shift toward a brighter and more eclectic approach to production'. In 2013, he won an award for Best Live Act from DJ Mag. Since launching a weekly podcast in 2022, he has provided 'some of the most insightful and considered critiques of clubland'.

== History ==
Paul Rose began his musical career in late 90s Indie band, Violet, where he played keyboards alongside bass player, Razorlight founder, Johnny Borrell and received his first official song writing credit on the song "Sleepwalking" on the band's only release before acrimonious breakup live on stage where Rose and another band member would go on to destroy the venue's PA. He later founded the Hotflush Recordings label in 2003, which released material by artists including Mount Kimbie, Benga, and Joy Orbison as well as his own music.

In 2007, Scuba relocated from London to Berlin. He cited reasons including dissatisfaction with his place in the London scene: 'I had just started to make a living from making music and the position I was in musically was one that I wasn't particularly enjoying'. He had performed a number of shows in Berlin before and maintained that he 'wanted to get away from London and nowhere in the UK would have fitted'. Berlin became his choice of residence partly as his friend Jamie Teasdale, of the early Dubstep duo Vex’d, had moved there.

Established in Berlin by 2008, Rose released his debut album, A Mutual Antipathy, described as featuring 'subs, huge drum patterns, dry synths worthy of minimal's finest sound designers and emotional crescendos enough to perhaps even satisfy a trance lover'.

His sophomore album, Triangulation, released in 2010, was seen as a 'breakthrough', and was described as 'expertly juxtaposing the dark with the romantic, the hectic with the serene'.

2011 saw a move away from Dubstep with the release of the singles, Loss, under his SCB alias, and Adrenalin, which contained 'three positively beaming slices of trancey (trancey!) techno' Both were listed in Resident Advisor's top 20 tracks of the year.

A third Scuba album, Personality, was released in 2012. Continuing the stylistic shift of the previous year, it was described as 'using prog house, trance, big beat, rave, old techno, and synth pop to create something stylishly retro. In 2019, Mixmag listed the album as one of the best of the decade.

After suffering health problems and an enforced break from touring, a fourth album, Claustrophobia, was released in April 2015. The album was described as 'a major step up; the sonics are simply dazzling. Rattled keys, wind chimes, rubbed wineglass rims, half-heard voices, and all manner of incidental rustle serve to make the music leap from the speakers.' Others saw it as a 'a lateral move rather than a step forward.'

Following the release of A Mutual Antipathy, Rose forged close links with the Berghain nightclub, where in July 2008 he launched a series of parties named SUB:STANCE, together with promoter Paul Fowler. He released an accompanying compilation album in 2010. This was followed in 2018 by a retrospective compilation, Sounds Of SUB:STANCE, and an album of unreleased material produced during the event's five-year run to 2013, entitled SUB:STANCE In Retrograde.

In addition to the SUB:STANCE mix released on Ostgut Ton, Scuba has also curated mix albums for the DJ-Kicks (2012) and Fabric (club) (2016) series.

After an extended break in which he focused on his SCB side-project, Rose returned to releasing music as Scuba in 2019. Long form projects followed, notably the 'Diivorce' collaboration with previously unknown vocalist DOMiNii, and two classic hardcore and acid house influenced mixtapes, 'Digital Underground' (described as "Proper breakbeat hardcore for proper ravers" ), and 'D:U:2'.

In 2022, Rose launched the 'Not A Diving Podcast', which aimed to offer 'fresh insight into the inner workings of the electronic music industry' Initially consisting of interviews with leading figures, including Laurent Garnier, Dave Clarke, and Skream, the following years saw the podcast expand into a detailed and sometimes caustic critique of the music industry and wider cultural section in the 21st Century. On an episode first broadcast on 11 July 2023, Rose argued that no 'great art has been produced by the music industry this century' and that contemporary musicians are better described as 'content creators'. In April 2026 he released a detailed discussion of the ticketing business and argued that the breakup of Live Nation Ticketmaster would not lead to a fall in ticket prices for fans. In June 2026 he criticised direct-to-consumer digital music platforms which ignore streaming in favour of 'the download model which has been proven not to work'.

Rose has occasionally made critical contributions in text form. In December 2024, he released an essay arguing that well-intentioned attempts to improve diversity in dance music have caused a damaging 'breakdown of the relationship between making music and playing out'. In February 2026, he argued that AI in music is the logical conclusion of decades of artistic decline driven by tech.

== Discography ==
=== Albums and mixtapes ===
- A Mutual Antipathy (Hotflush, 2008)
- Triangulation (Hotflush, 2010)
- Personality (Hotflush, 2012)
- Claustrophobia (Hotflush, 2015)
- Diivorce (Hotflush, 2021)
- Digital Underground (Hotflush, 2023)
- D:U:2 (Hotflush, 2024)

=== Selected Singles & EPs ===
- Timba / Sleepa (Hotflush, 2005)
- Aesaunic EP (Hotflush, 2009)
- Adrenalin (Hotflush, 2011)
- Talk Torque (Hotflush, 2012)
- Hardbody (Hotflush, 2012)
- Phenix1 EP (PIAS/Hotflush, 2014)
- Phenix2 EP (PIAS/Hotflush, 2014)
- Phenix3 EP (PIAS/Hotflush, 2014)
- Expectations (Hotflush, 2019)
- Forgive Me (Hotflush, 2020)
- Talaria (Aus Music, 2021)
- OneZeroFive (Hotflush, 2022)
- Womb (Hotflush, 2021)
- Opposites (Hotflush, 2023)
- Petrology (Hotflush, 2026)

=== Compilation albums ===
- Update (Hotflush, 2013)
- SUB:STANCE in Retrograde (Hotflush, 2018)

=== DJ mix albums ===
- SUB:STANCE (Ostgut Ton, 2010)
- DJ-KiCKS (!K7 Records, 2011)
- fabric 90 (Fabric, 2016)
