= It's the Long Goodbye =

Studio album by the Twilight Sad
- Released: 27 March 2026
- Recorded: 2025
- Studios: Battery Studios, London
- Genres: Post-punk, indie rock
- Length: 43:43
- Language: Scottish English
- Label: Rock Action
- Producer: Andy MacFarlane

The Twilight Sad chronology
Òran Mór 2020 (2020)	It's the Long Goodbye (2026)

Singles from It's the Long Goodbye
- 1. "Waiting for the Phone Call" Released: 28 October 2025; 2. "Designed to Lose" Released: 7 January 2026; 3. "Attempt a Crash Landing - Theme" Released: 24 February 2026

It's the Long Goodbye is the sixth studio album by Scottish indie rock band the Twilight Sad, released by Rock Action Records on 27 March 2026. It is the band's first studio album since 2019. Three singles preceded the album's release, which was followed by nationwide tours of the United Kingdom and Europe.

The album was released to universally positive reviews, and charted at number 3 on the Scottish Albums Chart, and number 42 on the UK Albums Chart.

== Critical reception ==
Professional ratings
Aggregate scores
Source	Rating
Metacritic	85/100
Review scores
Source	Rating
AllMusic	4.5/5 stars
Clash Music	9/10 stars
God Is in the TV	4.5/5 stars
Mojo	4/5 stars
Pitchfork	7.5/10 stars
PopMatters	8/10 stars
The Skinny	5/5 stars

It's the Long Goodbye was released to universal critical acclaim. At Metacritic, which assigns a normalised rating out of 100 based on reviews from mainstream critics, the album has received a score of 85, based on 10 reviews.

== Track listing ==
All lyrics are written by James Alexander Graham; all music is composed by Andy MacFarlane.

No.	Title	Length
1.	"Get Away From It All"	5:06
2.	"Designed to Lose"	3:46
3.	"Attempt a Crash Landing - Theme"	4:48
4.	"Waiting for the Phone Call"	5:36
5.	"The Ceiling Underground"	5:01
6.	"Dead Flowers"	7:07
7.	"Inhospitable/Hospital"	4:07
8.	"Chest Wound to the Chest"	3:59
9.	"Back to Fourteen"	3:30
10.	"TV People Still Throwing TVs at People"	5:49

== Personnel ==
Credits are adapted from the album's liner notes.

=== The Twilight Sad ===
- Andy MacFarlane – guitars, synthesizers, programming, production
- James Alexander Graham – vocals

=== Additional contributors ===
- Alex MacKay – bass, synthesizers, piano
- David Jeans – drums
- Robert Smith – 6-string bass, extra guitar, Tron keys (tracks 4, 6, 9); vambo
- Andy Savours – engineering, additional production
- Chris Coady – mixing
- Matt Colton – mastering
- DLT – artwork

== Charts ==
Chart (2026)	Peak position
Croatian International Albums (HDU)	17
French Physical Albums (SNEP)	159
French Rock & Metal Albums (SNEP)	35
Scottish Albums (Official Charts)	3
UK Albums (Official Charts)	42

== Release history ==
Country	Date	Label	Format	Catalogue #
United Kingdom, Europe and United States	27 March 2026	Rock Action Records	CD	ROCKACT155CD
United Kingdom, Europe and United States	27 March 2026	Rock Action Records	LP	ROCKACT155LP
United Kingdom, Europe and United States	27 March 2026	Rock Action Records	LP (red vinyl)	ROCKACT155LPS
United Kingdom, Europe and United States	27 March 2026	Rock Action Records	LP (yellow vinyl)	ROCKACT155LPX
