= Mile High (song) =

Single by James Blake featuring Travis Scott and Metro Boomin

from the album Assume Form
- Released: 17 January 2019
- Genre: Trap
- Length: 3:13
- Label: Polydor
- Songwriters: James Blake; Jacques Webster II; Leland Wayne
- Producers: James Blake; Metro Boomin; Dre Moon; Wavy; Dan Foat

James Blake singles chronology
"Don't Miss It" (2018)	"Mile High" (2019)	"Lullaby for My Insomniac" (2019)

Travis Scott singles chronology
"Yosemite" (2018)	"Mile High" (2019)	"First Off" (2019)

Metro Boomin singles chronology
"So Good" (2018)	"Mile High" (2019)	"Space Cadet" (2019)

Music video
- "Mile High" on YouTube

"Mile High" is a song by written and performed by English singer-songwriter and electronic music producer James Blake featuring American rapper and singer Travis Scott and American record producer Metro Boomin, released on 17 January 2019 through Polydor Records as the second single from the former's fourth studio album, Assume Form (2019). It was produced by Blake and Metro alongside Dan Foat, Dre Moon, and Wavy.

Musically, "Mile High" is a trap track which features influences from each artist's musical style. Following the track's premiere on Zane Lowe's Beats 1 show as that day's "World Record", the track was met with positive reviews from music critics, with most praising the three artists' chemistry.

In 2020, New Zealand singer Benee covered the song for Australian youth broadcaster Triple J's segment Like a Version.

== Background and recording ==
In an interview with Zane Lowe of Beats 1, James Blake revealed that the song was created during a recording session that was not initially meant to have anything to do with the album Assume Form. He was listening to Travis Scott singing over Metro Boomin's beat when, impressed, he asked to sing over it. He hailed Scott as "exceptionally talented at melodies" in an interview with Apple Music and also told Dazed that he was impressed at Scott's musical range, saying "he'd just released Astroworld, which is like banger after banger, and then he comes and does this really vulnerable, sweet love song." Blake also praised Metro Boomin, saying "the beat is a huge part of why that track feels the way it does."

== Composition ==
"Mile High" has been described as "a slow-burning soul trap banger" with "the signature Travis Scott bass hits and murky, rainy-weather James Blake mood." Rolling Stone noted that the track features "more of Blake’s DNA than his collaborators’", adding that the track "is an exercise in restraint." Conversely, Spin described it as "a quieter, dispassionate version of [...] most Travis Scott music." MTV noted that Scott "and his blunt rhymes [...] are balanced by Blake's gentle crooning." Vocally, the two artists' vocals range from a deep tone to a falsetto.

== Release and reception ==
The song was released just twelve hours prior to the release of Assume Form through Polydor Records. It premiered on Zane Lowe's Beats 1 show, where Lowe reportedly played the song three times over and said "James Blake, you’ve done it again."

"Mile High" was met with positive reviews from music critics, most praising the three artists' chemistry. Consequence of Sound deemed it the best track of the week, writing that it "proves that Scott can fit in on more than just his signature bangers, with an almost comforting delivery that’s more inviting than assertive." Stereogum gave it the same accolade, noting that "There’s a stuttering sample of something — a flute maybe? — that echoes like a birdcall through a rainforest. It’s lovely." Raisa Bruner featured it on Time's "5 Songs You Need to Listen to This Week" list, calling it "a love song [...] but also a flex — not just in terms of lyrical content, but also in terms of just how understated Blake can be." Robert Marshall of Hypebeast hailed the track as " perfect marriage of the trio’s distinct sounds, while also proving Blake’s sonic progression." Ben Devlin of MusicOMH echoed these views, writing that "it shows remarkable chemistry."

== Music video ==
A music video for "Mile High" was released on 3 February 2019, just hours before Scott's performance at the Super Bowl LIII halftime show, and had previously been teased on Blake's social media. It was directed by Nabil and is set at and filmed in the Mile High Cafe in Idyllwild, California. The visual has been compared by Rolling Stone and HotNewHipHop to the "sunken place" scene in the 2017 horror film Get Out. The video begins with Blake sitting in the Mile High Cafe with a cup of tea before Scott bangs on the cafe's window to gain his attention. Scott then sits down at Blake's table and discusses the colour of the sky and the idea of not owning a cell phone. While stirring his tea, Blake drifts off to a dark dreamworld inside his mind and begins to perform the song with Scott. Meanwhile, Scott tries to regain Blake's attention in the real world.

== Charts ==
=== Weekly charts ===
Weekly chart performance for "Mile High"
Chart (2019)	Peak position
Belgium (Ultratip Bubbling Under Flanders)	36
Lithuania (AGATA)	54
New Zealand Hot Singles (RMNZ)	9
Sweden Heatseeker (Sverigetopplistan)	9
UK Singles (Official Charts)	47
US Bubbling Under Hot 100 (Billboard)	22
US Hot Dance/Electronic Songs (Billboard)	10

=== Year-end charts ===
Year-end chart performance for "Mile High"
Chart (2019)	Position
US Hot Dance/Electronic Songs (Billboard)	43

== Certifications ==
Certifications for "Mile High"
Region	Certification	Certified units/sales
Brazil (Pro-Música Brasil)	Gold	20,000^{‡}
New Zealand (RMNZ)	Gold	15,000^{‡}
^{‡} Sales+streaming figures based on certification alone.

== Benee version ==
On 31 January 2020, New Zealand singer Benee featured on Australian youth broadcaster Triple J's segment Like a Version, where she performed a cover of the song, in addition to a performance of "Glitter".
