= Djrum =

English DJ and music producer

DjRUM
- Also known as: DJ Rum, Struction
- Born: Felix Manuel
- Origin: London, England
- Genres: Drum and bass; downtempo; ambient; dubstep; jazz; dub techno; post-dubstep
- Occupations: Musician; record producer; composer; DJ
- Instruments: Synthesiser; piano; turntables; laptop; flute; harp
- Years active: 2010–present
- Labels: Second Drop, R&S Records, Houndstooth Records

Felix Manuel, better known by his stage name Djrum (stylised as DjRUM; /dɹʌm/), is a British electronic music DJ and producer. His music spans a wide range of genres and influences including jazz, techno, UK garage, ambient and dubstep.

He is known for his unpredictable and eclectic approach to DJ performance, as well as his narrative and introspective approach to electronic music production. Manuel has released music on several UK-based electronic music record labels including Second Drop, R&S Records and Houndstooth Records.

== Early life ==
Manuel played music from a young age, learning piano at the age of seven and later training as a jazz pianist. He learned to DJ after inheriting a collection of jazz records from his mother, experimenting with mixing jazz and trip-hop. This led him to later explore other genres including funk, soul and drum and bass.

== Career ==
=== Early career (2010–2016) ===
Manuel started his music career DJing bass music, ragga and jungle at squat parties. He regularly performed with the Yardcore Crew in London, and presented a monthly radio show on Sub.FM playing garage, dubstep, drum and bass, gabber and breakcore.

Manuel soon started producing his own records, including his debut 2011 release Mountains EP on Second Drop records which was well-received by reviewers. Finding success as part of the 2010s post-dubstep scene, he followed up with a second EP on the same label.

His debut album Seven Lies released in 2013 on Second Drop. Some reviewers praised the release for its versatility, range of influences, and immersive nature, however Resident Advisor described the release as dated, stating "Djrum could very well have a great album in him, but unfortunately this isn't it".

=== R&S Records and Portrait with Firewood (2017–2023) ===
Following his debut LP, Manuel released a trilogy of EPs and various singles including "LA" which peaked at 69 in the UK singles chart. Soon after, he signed with R&S Records and released the EP Broken Glass Arch in November 2017.

In 2018, Manuel released his follow-up LP on R&S titled Portrait with Firewood. The album, inspired by the work of performance artist Marina Abramović, sampled chamber instruments and spoken-word. The album has been described as an "intensely personal exploration" and showing a "dark beauty". The arrangements used were noted to expand from Manuel's previous sample-based works with extensive live instrumentation including his own piano improvisations, and contributions from cellist Zosia Jagodzinska. Manuel discussed his influences and process in an interview with The Vinyl Factory following the release:

Throughout 2017, as I obsessively worked on my album, I plunged myself into my own introspective world, partly looking for subject matter, and partly looking for answers. I thought about my own life situation, my personal identity, and how I relate to the outside world and people around me. I often distracted myself from the music by watching scenes from movies, documentaries, interviews and so on. The two things that influenced, or at lease resonated with, my thinking the most were Francis Bacon, particularly his interviews with David Sylvester, and footage of Marina Abramovic's works I found on YouTube.

— Interview with The Vinyl Factory

In this period, Manuel performed at many electronic music festivals across Europe including Gottwood, Waking Life, and Bang Face, as well as iconic clubs including Electric Brixton, and Berlin's Berghain.

=== Houndstooth Records and Under Tangled Silence (2024–present) ===
In 2024, Manuel released his first solo record since 2019 with Meaning's Edge on Houndstooth Records. This release continued his approach seen on Portrait with Firewood of recording live instruments, in particular the flute. Specific flutes used in the arrangements include the bansuri, shakuhachi, and a western classical flute. Significant musical influences in the work were noted to include dubstep, braindance, post-classical, grime and singeli. The EP peaked at number 15 on the UK official album charts, and number 2 on the official dance music album charts.

Manuel hosted a thirty minute set on BBC Radio 6 Music in September 2024.

In April 2025, Manuel released his third full-length album titled Under Tangled Silence, also on Houndstooth, Which peaked at number 9 on the official UK album charts and number 1 on the official dance album charts. The album featured significant piano work, incorporating Manuel's own improvisation, as well as other live instruments including harp, percussion and mbira. Cello contributions from Zosia Jagodzinska (who previously featured on Portrait with Firewood) were also featured. The album was written, arranged and recorded over eight years, however progress was hampered when Manuel's laptop motherboard overheated and melted, leading to a significant loss in data.

In support of the album's release, Manuel announced a 32-date international tour with dates at clubs including London's Fabric, Paris' Essaim and Primavera Sound.

In 2026, Manuel released 'I Wander EP' on Houndstooth Records, which was characterised by its use of chaotic breakbeats, jazz influences and experimental approach.

== Artistry ==
=== DJ and performance style ===
Manuel's DJ sets are known for their constant shifting throughout a wide range of genres and styles. Often his sets will incorporate many different corners of music, combining rave genres (such as dubstep, drum and bass, breakcore, house, techno etc.) with contrasting mellow styles (including trip-hop, jazz, soul, classical and ambient).

Typically mixing on vinyl records, Manuel often performs with three turntables which allow him to navigate large tempo shifts and style changes. His mixes showcase a wide range of turntablism skills, such as scratching, cutting, and pitch nudging to implement a wider range of expression into his sets.

=== Production style ===
Manuel's early production was rooted in sample manipulation, layering, and use of dark atmospheres. These early releases were noted for their dub techno influences.

As his career progressed, Manuel begun incorporating live instrumentation including piano improvisations, flutes, harps, cello and live percussion. These styles are most prominent on albums Portrait with Firewood and Under Tangled Silence.

Structurally, Manuel's tracks rarely conform to typical dance music structures, and often avoid repetition to create a more narrative experience for the listener. Similar to his DJ sets, Manuel rarely sticks to a single style or genre in his productions, being known for his unpredictability and experimental approach to dance music structure.

Manuel has also coined the name and genre "ambient-gabber", a niche microgenre combining elements of ambient music and gabber.

=== Influences ===
Musically, Manuel takes influence from a wide range of genres including jazz, jungle, trip-hop, dubstep, breakcore, dub and techno. Aside from music however, Manuel draws much of his artistic inspiration from his own introspection, sense of identity and personal connections to the world around him, as well as drawing influences from other forms of art including the works of Marina Abramović and Francis Bacon.

== Discography ==
=== Studio albums ===
- Seven Lies – 2013
- Portrait with Firewood – 2018
- Under Tangled Silence – 2025

=== Extended plays and singles ===
- Plead With Me – 2010
- St Martin – 2010
- Watermark – 2012
- "Plantain" / "What I Was Doing When I Was Doing What I Was Doing" – 2015
- Forgetting EP – 2016
- LA – 2016
- Space Race – 2016
- Broken Glass Arch – 2017
- "Hard to Say" / "Tournesol" – 2019
- Meaning's Edge – 2024
- "Come Find Me" – 2025
- 'I Wander EP' - 2026

== See also ==
- List of post-dubstep musicians
- R&S Records
