= Cold Spring Fault Less Youth =

Studio album by Mount Kimbie
- Released: 27 May 2013
- Genres: Electronic, post-dubstep, art pop
- Length: 42:46
- Label: Warp
- Producers: Dominic Maker, Kai Campos

Mount Kimbie chronology
Crooks & Lovers (2010)	Cold Spring Fault Less Youth (2013)	Love What Survives (2017)

Cold Spring Fault Less Youth is the second studio album by British electronic music duo Mount Kimbie. It was released on Warp Records on 27 May 2013. Vocalist King Krule is featured on two tracks.

== Background ==
On 25 March 2013, Pitchfork announced the release of Cold Spring Fault Less Youth, Mount Kimbie's second album. The album was released on 28 May 2013 with Warp Records and features two collaborations with King Krule. Single "Made to Stray" was first aired on London DJ Ben UFO's weekly Rinse FM show on 7 March 2013. The track was also featured in the radio station Worldwide FM in the video game Grand Theft Auto V and in an advert for Intel and FC Barcelona, along with "Break Well", another track from the album.

Campos says in an interview with Pitchfork "With Mount Kimbie, we started off trying to imitate other stuff-- and we failed. But in failing to do that, we stumbled across a sound that's inherently our own. Failing to imitate others only happens because of the mindset that you come from. It's part of finding your own voice. When musicians go through that, the results are, by definition, original. Most of the music that sounds like it's been influenced by [Crooks & Lovers] that has come out since sounds fairly dull, and it's not something we want to carry on doing. We want to get away from it.".

Maker says in an interview with FACT "The new stuff is a lot more free than the songs we’ve done before, in terms of composition. It’s still entirely produced on a computer, but the drums and percussion are much more live in their feel, in rhythm and in flow. In terms of the actual sound…it’s quite a bit bigger sounding that what we’ve done before. I think it’s still quite delicate material, but it has a bigger sound compared to the last album, and I think that must be informed really greatly by what we’ve spent the last two years doing – playing live."

As part of album release, Mount Kimbie hosted their "Mount Kimbie & friends" Boiler Room session on 21 May. Guest DJs included James Blake, Gilles Peterson, Micachu, George Fitzgerald, Midland, Jon Rust, Reecha, and Demus.

Artwork for the album is by Leif Podhajsky, and the official video for "Made To Stray" was also directed by him. A video for "You Took Your Time" was produced by Marcus Söderlund and released in July 2013.

On 28 October 2013 Warp released the Mount Kimbie CSFLY Remixes EP, showcasing remixes off the Cold Spring Fault Less Youth album. Detroit techno wonderkid Kyle Hall, cosmic house artist DJ Koze, left field electronic experimentalist Lee Gamble & the South London "DJ's DJ" DJ Oneman ft. Jeremiah Jae all feature.

== Critical reception ==
Professional ratings
Aggregate scores
Source	Rating
AnyDecentMusic?	7.3/10
Metacritic	81/100
Review scores
Source	Rating
AllMusic	4/5 stars
The Guardian	4/5 stars
The Irish Times	4/5 stars
Mixmag	4/5
NME	8/10
The Observer	3/5 stars
Pitchfork	7.7/10
Resident Advisor	3.0/5
Uncut	8/10
XLR8R	7.5/10

At Metacritic, which assigns a weighted average score out of 100 to reviews from mainstream critics, Cold Spring Fault Less Youth received an average score of 81% based on 22 reviews, indicating "universal acclaim". Dummy Magazine included "Cold Spring Fault Less Youth" in their "Best Of 2013" list

Bram E. Gieben of The Skinny gave the album 5 stars out of 5, saying: "After kickstarting the post-dubstep sound on Crooks & Lovers, Mount Kimbie have turned their attention towards stranger sounds and more challenging song structures, bringing Kai Campos' vocals to the fore." Al Horner of NME described it as "an album that claws for attention, the careful nuances, shuffling rhythms and strange emotions of their first outing fine-tuned into something unmissable."

== Track listing ==
No.	Title	Length
1.	"Home Recording"	4:38
2.	"You Took Your Time" (featuring King Krule)	5:13
3.	"Break Well"	3:41
4.	"Blood and Form"	3:53
5.	"Made to Stray"	4:45
6.	"So Many Times, So Many Ways"	4:07
7.	"Lie Near"	3:25
8.	"Meter, Pale, Tone" (featuring King Krule)	3:31
9.	"Slow"	3:19
10.	"Sullen Ground"	3:30
11.	"Fall Out"	2:34
Total length:		42:46

Japanese edition (bonus track)
No.	Title	Length
12.	"Pulse"	1:09
Total length:		43:55

== Charts ==
Chart (2013)	Peak position
Belgian Albums (Ultratop Flanders)	43
UK Albums (Official Charts)	72
UK Dance Albums (Official Charts)	9
UK Independent Albums (Official Charts)	18
US Heatseekers Albums (Billboard)	20
US Top Dance Albums (Billboard)	21
