= Matt Colton =

English mastering engineer (born 1975)

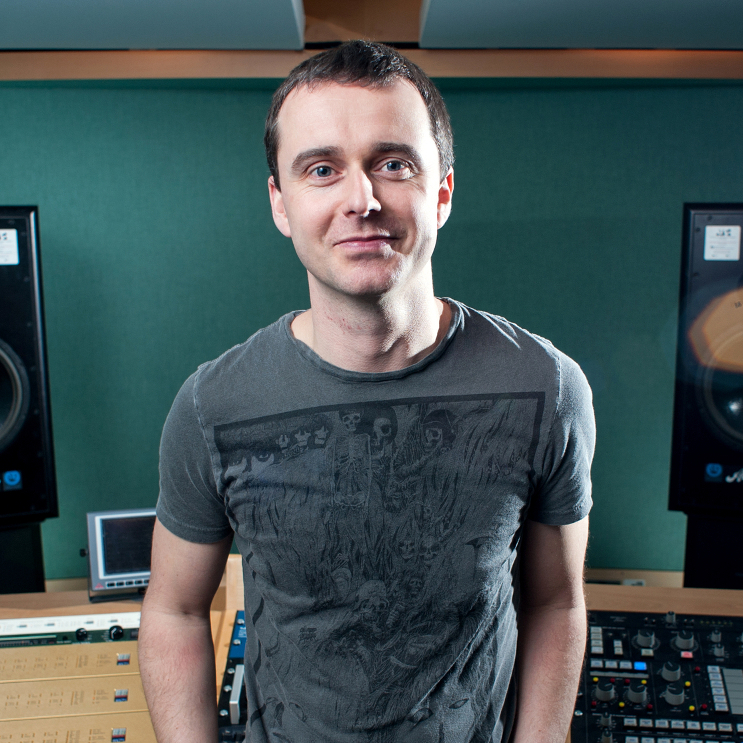

Background information
- Also known as: The Alchemist
- Born: 30 March 1975 (age 51)
- Genres: Rock; pop; electronica; house; classical; reggae; folk; jazz
- Occupation: Mastering engineer
- Years active: 1997–present
- Labels: Warner; Sony; Universal; Mute

Matt Colton is an English mastering engineer and member of the Music Producers Guild. Colton began his mastering career in 1997 at Porky's Mastering run by George 'Porky' Peckham, and has worked at various studios including AIR Studios, Alchemy Mastering and Metropolis. He has mastered records for artists including Arctic Monkeys, Thom Yorke, the Cure, George Michael, Depeche Mode, Aphex Twin, Ellie Goulding, Tame Impala and the Rolling Stones.

Other notable releases include albums for James Blake, Sampha, Michael Kiwanuka, Arlo Parks, and Little Simz, who all won the Mercury Music Prize respectively. Also Christine and the Queens' Chaleur Humaine achieved international multi-platinum sales, whereas Flume’s Skin, Patient Number 9 by Ozzy Osbourne, Wet Leg by Wet Leg, Hackney Diamonds by the Rolling Stones were awarded Grammys in their respective release years.

Colton masters all stereo formats including Half-Speed Vinyl, Pure Analogue Vinyl, and Live To Vinyl recording sessions at Metropolis Studios. He also mixes and masters in the Dolby Atmos format, for artists including Oasis, Blur, James Blake, Corrine Bailey Rae and Disclosure. Colton was awarded the Music Producers Guild (MPG) Mastering Engineer of the year award in 2013, 2018, and 2020.

He has lectured on mastering at various institutions including the London Electronic Music Event, Prism's Mic to Mastering tour, Alchemea College in London, and dBS Music Technology college in Bristol.

In 2025, he won the Grammy Award for Best Engineered Album, Non-Classical for his mastering work on Peter Gabriel's i/o album. This follows on from Colton remastering Gabriel's first four solo albums.

== Selected discography ==
- Arctic Monkeys – The Car 2022
- Arctic Monkeys – Tranquility Base Hotel & Casino 2018
- Aphex Twin – Selected Ambient Works Volume II—Expanded Edition (remastered) 2024
- Arlo Parks – Collapsed in Sunbeams 2021
- Arlo Parks – My Soft Machine 2023
- Beth Gibbons – Lives Outgrown 2024
- Blur – The Ballad of Darren 2023
- Boards of Canada - Inferno 2026
- Christine and the Queens – Chaleur Humaine 2014
- Clark – Steep Stims 2025
- Corrine Bailey Rae – Black Rainbows 2023
- The Cure – Songs of a Lost World 2024
- The Cure – Mixes of a Lost World 2025
- Depeche Mode – Memento Mori 2023
- Disclosure – Alchemy 2023
- Djrum – Under Tangled Silence 2025
- Dua Lipa and the Blessed Madonna – Club Future Nostalgia 2020
- Ellie Goulding – Brightest Blue 2020
- Elton John and Brandi Carlile – Who Believes in Angels? 2025
- Flume – Flume 2012
- Flume – Skin 2016
- Foals – Life Is Yours 2022
- Fontaines DC – Romance 2024
- George Michael – Faith (remastered) 2011
- Hot Chip – Why Make Sense? 2015
- Hot Chip – Freakout/Release 2022
- Iggy Pop – Every Loser 2023
- James Blake – James Blake 2011
- James Blake – Overgrown 2013
- James Blake – The Colour in Anything 2016
- James Blake – Playing Robots Into Heaven 2023
- Joy Crookes – Juniper 2025
- Jungle – Volcano 2023
- Jungle – Sunshine 2026
- Justice – Flower In A Hurricane 2026
- Little Simz – Sometimes I Might Be Introvert 2021
- Loyle Carner – Hugo 2022
- Manic Street Preachers – The Ultra Vivid Lament 2021
- Metronomy – Love Letters 2014
- Michael Kiwanuka – Kiwanuka 2019
- Michael Kiwanuka – Small Changes 2024
- Model/Actriz – Pirouette 2025
- Nick Cave, Warren Ellis – CARNAGE 2021
- Noel Gallagher’s High Flying Birds – Council Skies 2023
- Ozzy Osbourne – Patient Number 9 2022
- Paulo Nutini – Last Night In The Bittersweet 2022
- Pearl Jam – Dark Matter 2024
- Peter Gabriel – i/o 2023
- Pet Shop Boys – Nonetheless 2024
- Pulp – More 2025
- Rachel Chinouriri – What a Devastating Turn of Events 2024
- Robbie Williams - Britpop 2026
- The Rolling Stones – Hackney Diamonds 2023
- Sampha – Process 2017
- Sampha – Lahai 2023
- Self Esteem – A Complicated Woman 2025
- Shania Twain – Queen of Me 2023
- Squarepusher – Damogen Furies 2012
- Sunn O))) – Life Metal 2019
- Tame Impala – Deadbeat 2025
- Thom Yorke – Suspiria (Music for the Luca Guadagnino film) 2018
- Thom Yorke – Confidenza (Original Soundtrack) 2024
- Thurston Moore – The Best Day 2014
- The Twilight Sad – It's the Long Goodbye 2026
- Vegyn – Only Diamonds Cut Diamonds 2019
- Wet Leg – Wet Leg 2022
- Yard Act – Where's My Utopia? 2024
