= Portrait with Firewood =

Studio album by Djrum
- Released: August 17, 2018
- Genre: Ambient, dubstep, electronic, techno
- Length: 53:04
- Label: R&S

Djrum chronology
Broken Glass Arch (2017)	Portrait with Firewood (2018)	"Hard to Say" / "Tournesol" (2019)

Singles from Portrait with Firewood
- 1. "Sex" Released: 26 June 2018; 2. "Waters Rising" Released: 24 July 2018

Portrait with Firewood is the second full-length studio album by English electronic music producer Djrum. The album was released on 17 August 2018 on R&S Records.

== Background ==
Djrum signed with record label R&S Records in 2017, and in November of that year released the EP Broken Glass Arch. Portrait with Firewood was released on the same imprint.

The inspiration for the album arose from a period of self-reflection and introspection experienced by Djrum, as well as the work of performance artist Marina Abramović. The title itself is a reference to one of Abramovic's works. He discussed this period of time and his influences behind the album with The Vinyl Factory:

Throughout 2017, as I obsessively worked on my album, I plunged myself into my own introspective world, partly looking for subject matter, and partly looking for answers. I thought about my own life situation, my personal identity, and how I relate to the outside world and people around me. I often distracted myself from the music by watching scenes from movies, documentaries, interviews and so on. The two things that influenced, or at lease resonated with, my thinking the most were Francis Bacon, particularly his interviews with David Sylvester, and footage of Marina Abramovic's works I found on YouTube.

— Interview with The Vinyl Factory

Djrum has stated that the album is his way of making music about situations and human feelings, and that he wanted to touch on "more detailed emotional complexity". He has described the album as a "confessional record", and wanted to create something "overwhelmingly beautiful".

== Musical style, writing and composition ==
Portrait with Firewood has been noted for its multi-genre approach, combining several aspects of club and rave music with elements of modern classical. Specific genre influences have been noted to include jungle, breakcore, techno and ambient. The instrumentation used in the album include distorted basses and harsh breakbeats (typical of rave music styles) with more introspective piano, cello and vocals.

Much of the album's writing process was undertaken through improvisation techniques, partially due to Djrum's background as a jazz-trained musician. He noted that the piano, cello, vocal and many of the percussion elements were derived from spontaneous improvisation.

== Recording and production ==
The production process for the album used elements of electronic sampling, as well as recordings of live instrumentation, particularly piano and cello. The piano parts in particular were recorded using contact microphones, which work through contact with solid objects to enhance the timbre of the instrument. The cello parts were recorded by cellist Zosia Jagodzinska, and vocalist Lola Empire provided contributions on several tracks.

Djrum sampled dialogue and quotations from films to contribute to the emotional backdrop of the record, as well as prominent use of field recordings. Djrum also used hardware synthesizers for the first time in his production career.

== Artwork and packaging ==
The album artwork was created by Michael Mitsas. Alongside its digital release, the album was also sold as a double vinyl LP which included an in-picture sleeve and printed inner sleeves. A fifty copy limited edition of the LP was also produced which included three A4 art prints by Mitsas.

== Release, promotion and marketing ==
In support of the album, Djrum released the first single, "Sex", in June 2018. This was followed up with the second single "Waters Rising", which featured vocalist Lola Empire.

== Critical reception ==
Professional ratings
Review scores
Source	Rating
Pitchfork	7.4/10
The Line of Best Fit	8/10
AllMusic	3.5/5 stars

Portrait with Firewood was generally received well by critics. Vincent Morris from The Line of Best Fit described the album as "Djrum's most honest work to date" and praised the maturity of the record and Djrum's willingness to step outside his comfort zone.

Andy Beta from Pitchfork praised the record's evocative nature and emotional themes, however noted that some of the lyricism and spoken word elements were "pat" and "hokey".

== Track listing ==
No.	Title	Length
1.	"Unblocked"	02:00
2.	"Waters Rising"	06:19
3.	"Creature, Pt. 1"	04:43
4.	"Creature, Pt. 2"	05:38
5.	"Sex"	08:27
6.	"Blue Violet"	08:40
7.	"Sparrows"	04:40
8.	"Showreel, Pt. 3"	09:34
9.	"Blood in My Mouth"	03:00
Total length:		53:04

== Personnel ==
- Felix Manuel (Djrum) – composition, arrangement, production, piano and percussion

=== Additional musicians ===
- Zosia Jagodzinska – cello
- Lola Empire – vocals

=== Technical personnel ===
- Artwork – Michael Mitsas
- Mastering – Dubplates & Mastering
