= Joy Orbison =

English electronic musician (born 1986)

- Born: Peter O'Grady; 27 September 1986 (age 40)
- Origin: Croydon, England
- Genres: House; dubstep; UK funky; UK garage; 2-step garage; trip hop
- Years active: 2009–present
- Labels: Hotflush; Doldrums; Hingefinger; SunkLo; Swamp81
- Website: joy-orbison.com

Peter O'Grady (born 27 September 1986), better known as Joy Orbison or Joy O, is an English electronic musician. His style is a coalescence of house, dubstep, UK funky, UK garage and oldschool jungle. O'Grady achieved underground success with his debut single "Hyph Mngo", released via Hotflush Recordings in September 2009. He is also known for his collaborations with Boddika.

== Biography ==
O'Grady credits his uncle Ray Keith for introducing him to jungle and UK garage at a young age. At 13, he took up DJing and eventually moved into production in his 20s, using Fruity Loops to create 8-bar grime loops before developing his sound combining house, disco and dubstep. He cites influences as diverse as J Dilla, My Bloody Valentine, GG Allin, Josef K and The Beach Boys.

His debut single "Hyph Mngo" was called the most forward-thinking dubstep track of 2009 and received airplay and floorplay worldwide. This was followed by "Brkln Clln" on O'Grady's own label Doldrums, which he ran in tandem with partner Impey. In 2010, O'Grady released "The Shrew Would Have Cushioned The Blow" on Aus Music, an eclectic record label founded by Will Saul and Fink.

"Hyph Mngo" was voted #23 in the Resident Advisor top 100 tracks of the 2000s and #1 in Fact Magazine's top tracks of 2009. He was named number 18 in NME's New Music Tips of 2010 and voted 19th in the Resident Advisor 'Top DJs of 2012' poll.

In 2012, O'Grady began residencies at his own London based club night 'Just For You' and at Manchester's 'meandyou' party. He also launched a record label called Hinge Finger which is co-run by artist Will Bankhead. As of 2020 Joy Orbison plays himself as the host of Still Slippin' Los Santos, one of the in-game radios stations in Grand Theft Auto Online. Although advertised in-game mainly as a techno/drum and bass pirate radio station, the fictional station plays experimental electronic, UK hip-hop, grime and dancehall.

== Discography ==
=== Mixtapes ===
Title	Details	Peak chart positions	
Title	Details	UK	SCO
Still Slipping Vol. 1	Released: 13 August 2021; Label: Hinge Finger, XL; Formats: CD, LP, digital download, streaming	92	68

=== Extended plays ===
- Toss Portal (2017)
- 81b (2018)
- Slipping (2019)

=== Singles ===
- 2009: "Hyph Mngo"/"Wet Look" (Hotflush Recordings)
- 2009: "J. Doe"/"BRKLN CLLN" (Doldrums Recordings)
- 2010: "The Shrew Would Have Cushioned The Blow" (Aus Music)
- 2010: "BB"/"Ladywell" (Doldrums Recordings)
- 2011: "Wade In"/"Jels" (Hotflush Recordings) (as Joy O)
- 2011: "Sicko Cell"/"Knock Knock" (Swamp81)
- 2012: "Swims" (with Boddika) (Swamp81)
- 2012: "Froth"/"Mercy" (with Boddika) (SunkLo)
- 2012: "Dun Dun"/"Prone" (with Boddika) (SunkLo)
- 2012: "Ellipsis" (Hinge Finger)
- 2012: "Faint"/"Nil (Reece)"/"Moist" (with Boddika & Pearson Sound) (SunkLo)
- 2013: "&Fate" (with Boddika) (Nonplus Records)
- 2013: "Big Room Tech House DJ Tool - TIP!" (Nonplus Records)
- 2014: "More Maim"/"In Here" (with Boddika) (SunkLo)
- 2014: "Tricky's Team" (with Boddika)
- 2015: "TMTT" (with Boddika)
- 2016: "Severed Seven / Cc / More Moan" (with Boddika) (SunkLo)
- 2017: "Dekmantel Selectors 004" (Compilation)
- 2017: "Off Season/Fuerza" (Hinge Finger)
- 2018: "Transition 2" (with Ben Vince) (Hessle Audio)
- 2018: "C.E. Tape" (Cassette) (Cav Empt)
- 2024: "Flight Fm" (Hinge Finger)
