= Love What Survives =

Studio album by Mount Kimbie
- Released: 8 September 2017
- Genres: Post-punk, electronic
- Length: 39:17
- Label: Warp
- Producers: Dominic Maker; Kai Campos

Mount Kimbie chronology
Cold Spring Fault Less Youth (2013)	Love What Survives (2017)	Mount Kimbie DJ Kicks (2018)

Love What Survives is the third studio album by British electronic music duo Mount Kimbie, released on Warp on 8 September 2017.

== Background ==
Artwork for the album is by Frank Lebon, who also directed the official videos for "Marilyn" (featuring Micachu), "We Go Home Together" (featuring James Blake) and "Delta". They teased the album for several months before officially revealing the details, such as the title and release date. "Blue Train Lines" is the third single from the album, after "We Go Home Together" and "Marilyn". It features eleven songs.

== Critical reception ==
Professional ratings
Aggregate scores
Source	Rating
AnyDecentMusic?	7.5/10
Metacritic	82/100
Review scores
Source	Rating
AllMusic	4/5 stars
The A.V. Club	B
The Guardian	4/5 stars
The Irish Times	4/5 stars
Mixmag	8/10
Mojo	4/5 stars
Pitchfork	8.4/10
Q	4/5 stars
Resident Advisor	4.0/5
XLR8R	8/10

The album has received strongly positive reviews on release; DIY gave the album a 4/5 review, describing it as "the most affecting work to date by some stretch", and Mixmag called the album "searingly brilliant" and rated it 8/10. Pitchfork rated the album 8.4/10, selecting it as their "Best New Music".

At Metacritic, which assigns a normalized rating out of 100 to reviews from mainstream publications, Love What Survives received an average score of 82, based on 25 reviews, indicating "universal acclaim".

=== Accolades ===
Publication	Accolade	Rank	Ref.
Pitchfork	The 50 Best Albums of 2017	34	

== Track listing ==
No.	Title	Length
1.	"Four Years and One Day"	3:17
2.	"Blue Train Lines" (featuring King Krule)	4:10
3.	"Audition"	4:12
4.	"Marilyn" (featuring Micachu)	4:06
5.	"SP12 Beat"	2:33
6.	"You Look Certain (I’m Not So Sure)" (featuring Andrea Balency)	3:22
7.	"Poison"	1:54
8.	"We Go Home Together" (featuring James Blake)	2:32
9.	"Delta"	4:03
10.	"T.A.M.E.D"	4:11
11.	"How We Got By" (featuring James Blake)	5:07
Total length:		39:17

Japanese edition (bonus track)
No.	Title	Length
12.	"SP12 Beat" (Part 2)	2:49
Total length:		42:14

== Charts ==
Chart (2017)	Peak position
Belgian Albums (Ultratop Flanders)	49
Belgian Albums (Ultratop Wallonia)	99
UK Albums (Official Charts)	98
