= Dominic Maker =

English record producer and musician

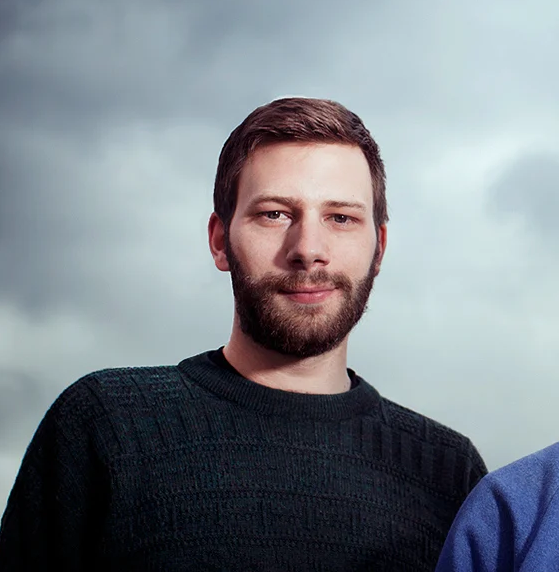
- Maker in 2013
- Born: Dominic Patrick Maker; 12 September 1986 (age 39); Chichester, England
- Other name: Dom Maker
- Musical career
- Genres: Post-dubstep; ambient; future garage; art pop; hip hop
- Occupations: Record producer; songwriter
- Years active: 2008–present
- Member of: Mount Kimbie

Dominic Patrick Maker (born 12 September 1986) is an English record producer and songwriter from Chichester. He is known for his production work for artists such as James Blake, Lil Yachty, Slowthai, Rosalía, Travis Scott and Jay-Z. He performs as part of James Blake’s live band and was also one half of the duo Mount Kimbie.

== Biography ==
Maker initially met Mount Kimbie member Kai Campos, at London South Bank University, where he was studying film. Their debut album Crooks & Lovers was released in 2010 and since signing to Warp in 2012 they have released a total of three albums.

After moving to Los Angeles in 2017, he began to work more closely with English musician James Blake, co-producing and co-writing a number of tracks on his album Assume Form (2019). They then produced for American rapper Jay-Z’s album 4:44, making his track "ManyFacedGod".

In 2020, he co-produced Blake's single "You're Too Precious". In May of that year, he produced Slowthai's single "Bodybag".

Maker produced "Feel Away", and collaborated on the tracks "Focus" and "Push" from Slowthai's UK number one album, Tyron. Following an interview with Highsnobiety, the "Feel Away" collaboration was described by Maker as an "instinctive piece of music," going on to discuss how the track came to fruition. "You know who would be sick on this?" Ty suggested. "James—James should sing on it." Maker sent the track to Blake, who was in New York at the time, and received his contribution a day later, with additional vocals and piano.

In 2021, Maker contributed to the soundtrack of the Oscar-winning short film Two Distant Strangers, co-producing the closing track "Two Distant Strangers", which features Joey Badass.

Maker, along with James Blake, co-produced the unreleased Travis Scott and Westside Gunn track that was premiered at the Cactus Jack Dior Summer 2022 fashion show in Paris.

In November 2021, Maker received a Grammy nomination for his co-production work on James Blake's track "Before". The song was nominated for Best Dance/Electronic Recording.

In July 2022 Dom remixed the title track from Flume’s 2022 album Palaces, for which he brought Zelooperz for a new remix feature alongside the existing guest appearance from Gorillaz and Blur's Damon Albarn.

September 2022 saw Dom announce the first full-length Mount Kimbie release since 2017's Love What Survives. His half of the double album, entitled ‘Die Cuts,' will release along with the full project in November 2022.

Maker preluded the release of the album with a double-sided single release, with "A Deities Encore" featuring Liv.e and "In Your Eyes" featuring Slowthai and Danny Brown. ‘Locked In,' a bonus track featuring Maxo Kream and Pa Salieu, was released the day prior to the album announcement.
