= Hotflush Recordings =

British record label

- Founded: 2003
- Founder: Paul Rose
- Genre: Electronic; dubstep
- Country of origin: United Kingdom
- Location: London
- Official website: hotflushrecordings.com

Hotflush Recordings is a British record label. Founded by electronic musician Paul Rose, the label began as a UK garage night on Stokes Croft in Bristol when Scuba was studying at University of Bristol, booking the likes of Artful Dodger in the early 2000s. Later becoming a label it has released music by Scuba, Mount Kimbie, Boxcutter, Vaccine, Joy Orbison, Untold and many more.
