= Mount Kimbie =

English electronic music group

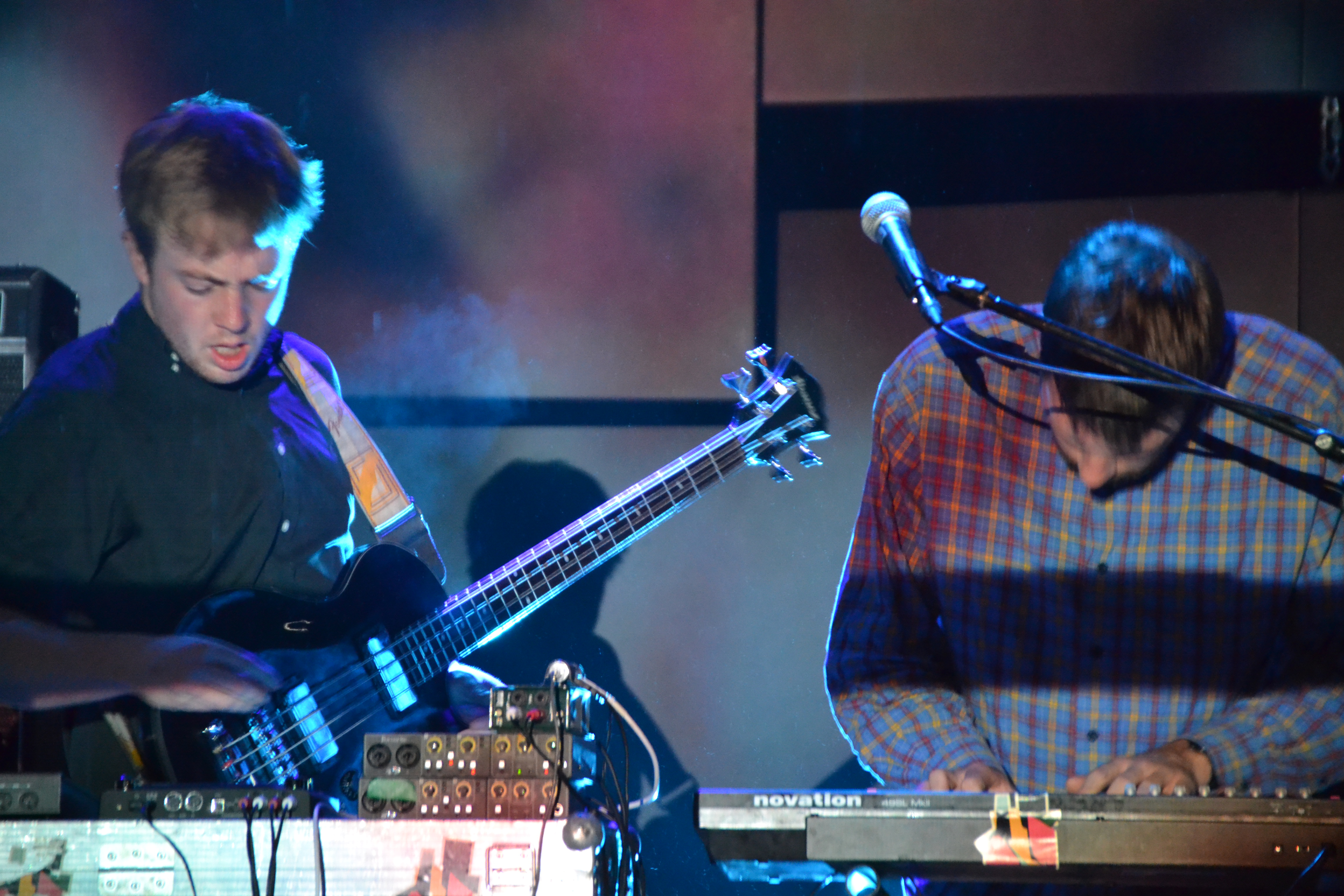
- Mount Kimbie at Electronic Beats Festival 2013, Podgorica, Montenegro

Background information
- Origin: London, England
- Genres: Electronic; post-dubstep; future garage; indie rock
- Years active: 2008–present
- Labels: Warp; Hotflush
- Members: Kai Campos; Dominic Maker; Andrea Balency-Béarn; Marc Pell
- Website: www.mountkimbie.com

Mount Kimbie is an English electronic music and indie rock group consisting of Dominic Maker, Kai Campos, Andrea Balency-Béarn and Marc Pell. Mount Kimbie was formed in 2008 by Maker and Campos. The duo expanded on the musical template of the UK dubstep scene, releasing early EPs Maybes and Sketch on Glass to critical praise the following year. Their debut album Crooks & Lovers in 2010 received further acclaim and was listed as one of the defining albums of the decade by DJ Mag.

The duo signed with Warp Records in 2012, and released their second album Cold Spring Fault Less Youth the following year, third album Love What Survives in September 2017, and a double album, MK 3.5: Die Cuts | City Planning, in November 2022. Drummer Marc Pell and keyboardist Andrea Balency-Béarn joined as live members in 2016, becoming full members in 2023 ahead of the band's fourth album, The Sunset Violent. Mount Kimbie has collaborated with artists such as James Blake, King Krule, and Micachu.

== History ==
=== Early years and Crooks & Lovers: 2008–2011 ===
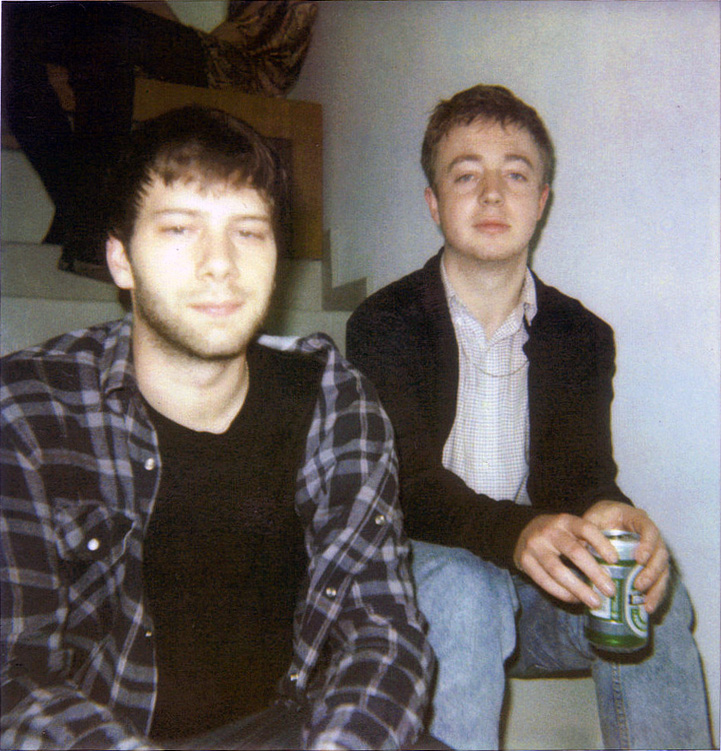
Maker (left) and Campos in 2010.

Kai Campos is originally from Cornwall, while Dom Maker is from Chichester. They met at Southbank University in London, where Campos was attending university for the second time and Maker was studying film. They started making music together at a home studio in Peckham, London.

Arguably responsible for inspiring the term "post-dubstep", the duo released a series of acclaimed early EPs, including Maybes and Sketch on Glass, that expanded beyond the dubstep sound. The band's debut album, titled Crooks & Lovers, was released on 19 June 2010 in the UK to critical acclaim. At the end of 2010, Crooks & Lovers was included in over thirty 'Best of 2010' lists, including NME, Mixmag, Resident Advisor, Pitchfork, Drowned in Sound. NME listed them at number 22 in their 30 Artists For 2011. In 2010, Mount Kimbie toured the UK, Europe and North America. They were also involved in the festival circuit playing at The Great Escape Festival, Stag & Dagger Festival, Glade Festival, Field Day Festival and Bestival amongst others. The duo were then invited to perform at Gilles Peterson's Worldwide Awards event in February 2011.

In March and April 2011, they embarked on a US tour which included performances at SXSW and Coachella. They also toured in Australia in March, selling out all six of their performances, with Australia's The Vine saying of their Melbourne performance, "They flesh out skeletal elements of tracks with alternative instrumentation, or accentuate features with subtle additions or substitutions. In this way much of the material aired tonight is invigoratingly bolstered, altered or augmented in some way. It makes for a stimulating performance." However, regarding a live realisation of Crooks & Lovers in Glasgow in early 2011, The Guardian said that "presenting such short tunes as standalone pieces when they might function better threaded together gives the set a disjointed feel".

The pair are closely linked to singer-songwriter and producer James Blake. He has collaborated with them live and lent his skills to the remixing of Maybes which features on the Mount Kimbie EP Remixes Part 1, released 12 April 2010, as well as contributing elements to Crooks & Lovers. They've also featured on his BBC Radio 1 residency. Mount Kimbie have since produced remixes for Kelis, The Big Pink, Foals, The xx, Andreya Triana, Nia Archives, DIIV, Untold and Flume.

=== Signing to Warp Records, Cold Spring Fault Less Youth and Love What Survives: 2012–2017 ===
Mount Kimbie signed to Warp Records in June 2012. The group toured North America that year with Squarepusher. Tony Kus joined the duo as their live drummer from October 2012 to 2015. Since 2016, Marc Pell of Micachu and the Shapes and Andrea Balency-Béarn have joined Mount Kimbie's live show on drums and keyboards. They released their second album Cold Spring Fault Less Youth in 2013. Mount Kimbie performed a full tour across the US and Europe in late 2013 to tie in with the launch of the album.

Throughout September 2015, Mount Kimbie hosted a weekly residency every Tuesday on London-based online radio station, NTS Radio. The shows included guests such as James Blake, William Basinski and King Krule. In July 2016, Mount Kimbie announced they would be taking a break from recording and be heading out on the road. Playing a small number of European shows including Pitchfork Music Festival.

In 2016, Chance the Rapper sampled Adriatic from their 2010 debut album on his mixtape Coloring Book on the track Juke Jam featuring Justin Bieber and Towkio.

A second 'transatlantic' NTS residency took place across April and May 2017, broadcasting out of both London and Los Angeles, and once again featuring guests including James Blake, King Krule, Actress and Warpaint. On 3 April 2017, Mount Kimbie released a new track, We Go Home Together on Warp Records, featuring long time collaborator James Blake. This was followed by another new track, Marilyn, featuring Micachu. The track was accompanied by a music video by fashion photographer Mark Lebon, featuring Lebon's sons, Tyrone and Frank, both of whom have previously collaborated with Mount Kimbie.

On 12 July 2017, Mount Kimbie announced that they would be releasing their third album, Love What Survives, on 8 September 2017. Alongside this they released a new track, Blue Train Lines, featuring King Krule.

Love What Survives featured contributions from King Krule, James Blake, Micachu and Andrea Balency-Béarn. The album received strongly positive reviews upon release; DIY gave the album a 4/5 review, describing it as "the most affecting work to date by some stretch", and Mixmag called the album "searingly brilliant" and rated it 8/10. Pitchfork rated the album 8.4/10, selecting it as their "Best New Music", as well ranking the album at 34th in their 50 Best Albums of 2017 list.

=== Touring, collaborations and MK 3.5: Die Cuts | City Planning: 2018–2022 ===
Mount Kimbie toured extensively across the world in 2017 and 2018 to support the album, including festival appearances at Pitchfork Music Festival, Primavera Sound, Field Day and Electric Picnic.

On 9 August 2018, Mount Kimbie's compilation release as part of the DJ-Kicks series was announced, featuring an original production by the duo titled Southgate. In 2019 they released a four-track live recording of the Warp NTS live session. In the same year they were commissioned by Adidas Originals to produce music for a new campaign.

On 15 September 2020, Slowthai, James Blake and Mount Kimbie released their collaborative single titled Feel Away which appeared on Slowthai's UK number one album, Tyron.

In July 2021, Mount Kimbie announced the release of two tracks that were part of the Love What Survives recording sessions, but did not make it onto the album. On 28 July 2021, the tracks titled Black Stone and Blue Liquid were released on limited edition vinyl and made available to download via their website until 30 July. An accompanying music video was made for Black Stone, directed by Peter Eason Daniels.

In November 2021, Maker received a Grammy nomination for Best Dance/Electronic Recording for his co-production on James Blake's track Before.

In September 2022 the duo released two double-sided singles, each with tracks produced by an individual member. Dom Maker released the tracks A Deities Encore, featuring Liv.e, and In Your Eyes, featuring frequent collaborator Slowthai alongside label mate, Danny Brown. Campos released two techno-infused tracks, Q and Quartz. Each were understood to feature on Mount Kimbie's forthcoming fourth album. Soon after, Maker released the non-album track Locked In featuring Maxo Kream and Pa Salieu.

The album, titled MK 3.5: Die Cuts | City Planning, was officially announced the day after Locked In was released. Rather than a straight collaboration, as on previous records, the album consists of two halves: one created by the now Los Angeles-based Maker, and the other the London-based Campos. It was released on Warp Records in November 2022. In July 2023, a deluxe version of the album, City Planning (Deluxe), was released featuring numerous remixes.

=== The Sunset Violent: 2023–present ===
Coinciding with the single Dumb Guitar in November 2023, a statement confirmed the official inclusion of Andrea Balency-Béarn and Marc Pell as part of Mount Kimbie. In February 2024, the now four-piece announced their next album, The Sunset Violent, would be released on 5 April 2024, along with the second single titled Fishbrain. The group also went on tour in support of the record.

On 20 June 2025, Mount Kimbie released a live album, The Sunset Violent (Live in Heidelberg). It features live performances of tracks from both Love What Survives and The Sunset Violent and was recorded at Metropolink Festival in Heidelberg, Germany.

On 31 July 2026, Mount Kimbie released a mix titled, fabric presents Mount Kimbie, released via Fabric Records.

== Style ==
Mount Kimbie's early work drew from the contemporary UK dubstep scene while expanding beyond its typical scope. The Guardian described the pair as "leading an exploratory breakaway from bass-heavy dubstep towards a lighter, hazier style of electronica rich with drowsy ambience and chopped-up found sounds." According to Resident Advisor, in their work "dubstep is unraveled and reassembled from its brawny rhythms upward, connecting the dots between musique concrète, R&B, hip-hop, drone and the midnight gospel sounds of Burial." In 2009, Pitchfork described their music as making use of "sped-up vocal samples, little tunnels of ambience, unimposing synth patches, and syncopated percussion that sounds like someone putting away the silverware," clarifying that "their rhythms are still dubstep in DNA-- deftly syncopated, slightly off-center, ambiguously danceable-- but most of what they lay on top of the beat sounds like it's being dragged out from places dubstep usually doesn't go: R&B, post-rock, IDM".

The duo use field recordings to form major elements of their music. "It’s amazing what you can pick up with a field microphone. I mean, you might just hear someone riding around but when you slow it down it’s almost like there’s a beat to it. And then just taking little pockets of that rhythm and stretching it out. A lot of what we do is about experimenting with different little bits of tone that you don’t necessarily hear on the first listen... and then trying to make songs out of them."

== Solo work ==
In 2018 Kai Campos curated a techno-driven DJ-Kicks mix and has been DJing consistently ever since, including a b2b tour with Actress and headline sets at Printworks and Fabric. Dominic Maker moved to Los Angeles and has produced for artists such as Jay-Z, Slowthai and James Blake.

== Discography ==
=== Studio albums ===
- Crooks & Lovers (2010, Hotflush)
- Cold Spring Fault Less Youth (2013, Warp)
- Love What Survives (2017, Warp)
- MK 3.5: Die Cuts | City Planning (2022, Warp)
- The Sunset Violent (2024, Warp)

=== EPs ===
- Maybes (2009, Hotflush)
- Sketch on Glass (2009, Hotflush)
- Blind Night Errand (2010, Hotflush)
- Crooks & Lovers Sampler (2010, Hotflush)
- Mount Kimbie Remixes, Pt.1 (2010, Hotflush)
- Mount Kimbie Remixes, Pt.2 (2010, Hotflush)
- Carbonated (2011, Hotflush)
- CSFLY Remixes (2013, Warp)
- Love What Survives Remixes - Part 1 (2018, Warp)
- Love What Survives Remixes - Part 2 (2018, Warp)
- WXAXRXP Session (2019, Warp)
- The Sunset Violent Remixes (2025, Warp)

=== Compilations ===
- DJ-Kicks: Mount Kimbie (2018, DJ-Kicks)
- fabric presents Mount Kimbie (2026, Fabric)

=== Live albums ===
- The Sunset Violent (Live in Heidelberg) (2025, Warp)

=== Remixes ===
- The xx – "Basic Space" (2009)
- The Big Pink – "Velvet" (2009)
- Foals - "Spanish Sahara" (2010)
- LV & Untold – "Beacon" (2010)
- Andreya Triana – "A Town Called Obsolete" (2010)
- Kelis – "Jerk Ribs" (2014)
- Flume (ft. Damon Albarn) – "Palaces" (2022)
- Nia Archives (ft. Maverick Sabre) – "No Need 2 Be Sorry, Call Me?" (2023)
- DIIV – "Everyone Out" (2025)
