= Post-dubstep =

Electronic music genre; British development of dubstep

- Stylistic origins: Dubstep; R&B; 2-step; ambient; minimal; IDM
- Cultural origins: Late 2000s, London, UK
- Typical instruments: Sequencer; turntables; sampler; drum machine; synthesizer; keyboard; personal computer
- Derivative forms: UK bass

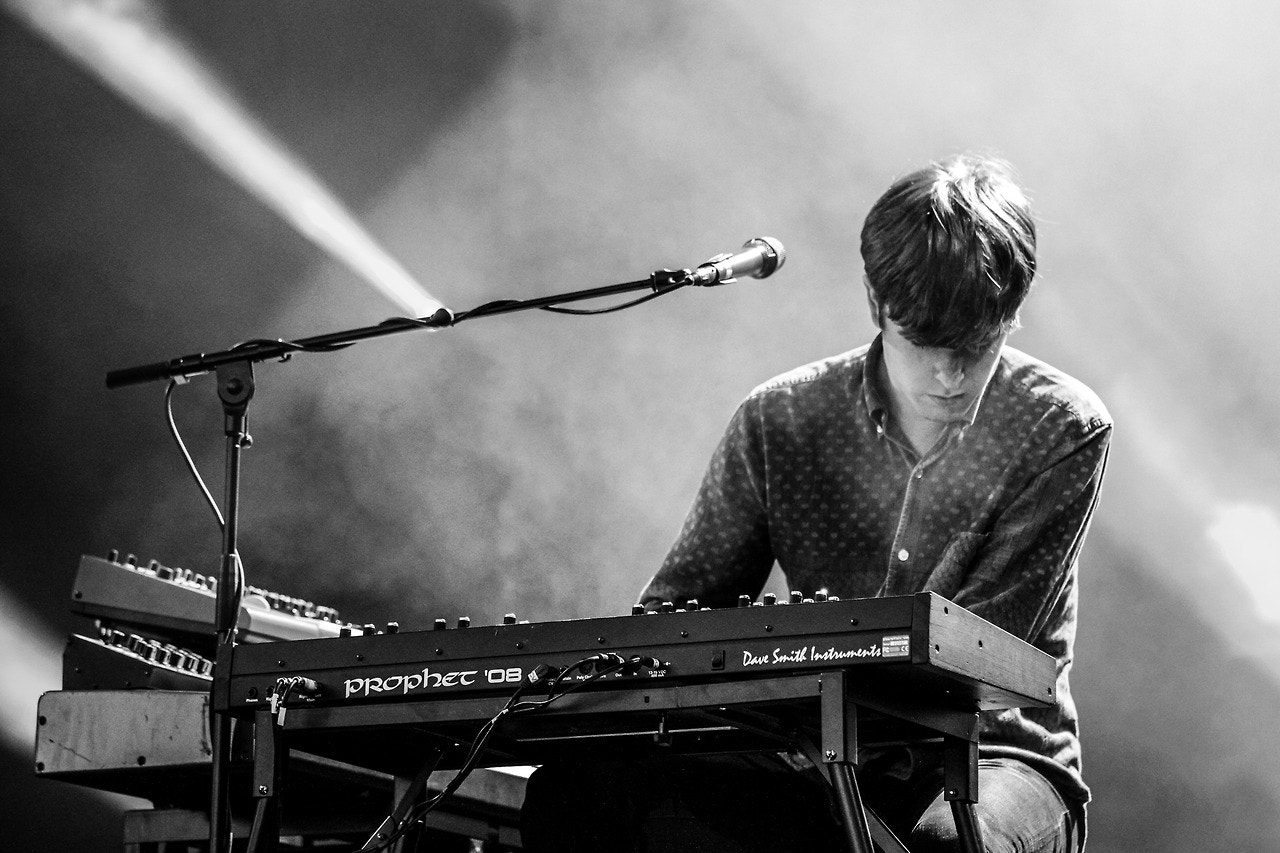
James Blake, a post-dubstep artist, at Melt! Festival, 2013

Post-dubstep is an umbrella term applied to a range of musical styles that have been influenced by the sparse, syncopated rhythms and heavy sub-bass of the UK dubstep scene.

The breadth of styles associated with the term post-dubstep precluded it from being a specific musical genre in the early 2010s. Such music often references earlier dubstep productions as well as UK garage, 2-step and other forms of underground electronic dance music. Artists producing music that has been described as post-dubstep have also incorporated elements of ambient music and early 2000s R&B. The latter in particular is heavily sampled by two artists described as defining post-dubstep, Mount Kimbie and James Blake.

== Characteristics ==
The tempo of music typically characterised as post-dubstep is approximately 130 beats per minute. Post-dubstep typically has a more minimal and mature sound than dubstep, featuring an overall sparse soundscape overlayed with soulful vocals and greater emphasis on elements like woozy synths and use of piano. The drum patterns in post-dubstep take a more minimalistic and experimental approach, featuring eclectic, broken drum patterns derived from but not fitting dubstep, focusing on adding atmosphere and texture rather than driving energy.

== History ==
The production duo Mount Kimbie is often associated with the origination of the term post-dubstep, and James Blake as its "poster boy". Mount Kimbie's Maybes EP, James Blake's remix of Untold's "Stop What You're Doing" and his eponymous debut album, and Joy Orbison's "Hyph Mngo" can be used as markers in the breaking off of post-dubstep as a distinct sound. The commercial popularity of the xx also marked a breakaway and a member of the band, Jamie xx, has released remixes which are considered post-dubstep, including the Gil Scott-Heron remix album "We're New Here".

Post-dubstep was not a long-lived phenomenon, having been already moved past from by 2013, with the scene being largely absorbed later in the 2010s by genres such as UK bass, alternative R&B, and other developments in dubstep.

== Notable acts ==
Names frequently associated with post-dubstep are Ikonika, 2562, Cityscape, Deadboy, Martyn, Floating Points, Pangaea, Ramadanman, Sepalcure, FaltyDL, Pariah, Burial, The Weeknd, SBTRKT, Scuba, Egyptrixx, Persian Empire, Shackleton, Starkey, Matthew Thompson, Ital Tek, Ifan Dafydd, Guido, Four Tet and the U.K. labels Hotflush and Hyperdub.
