= James Blake discography =

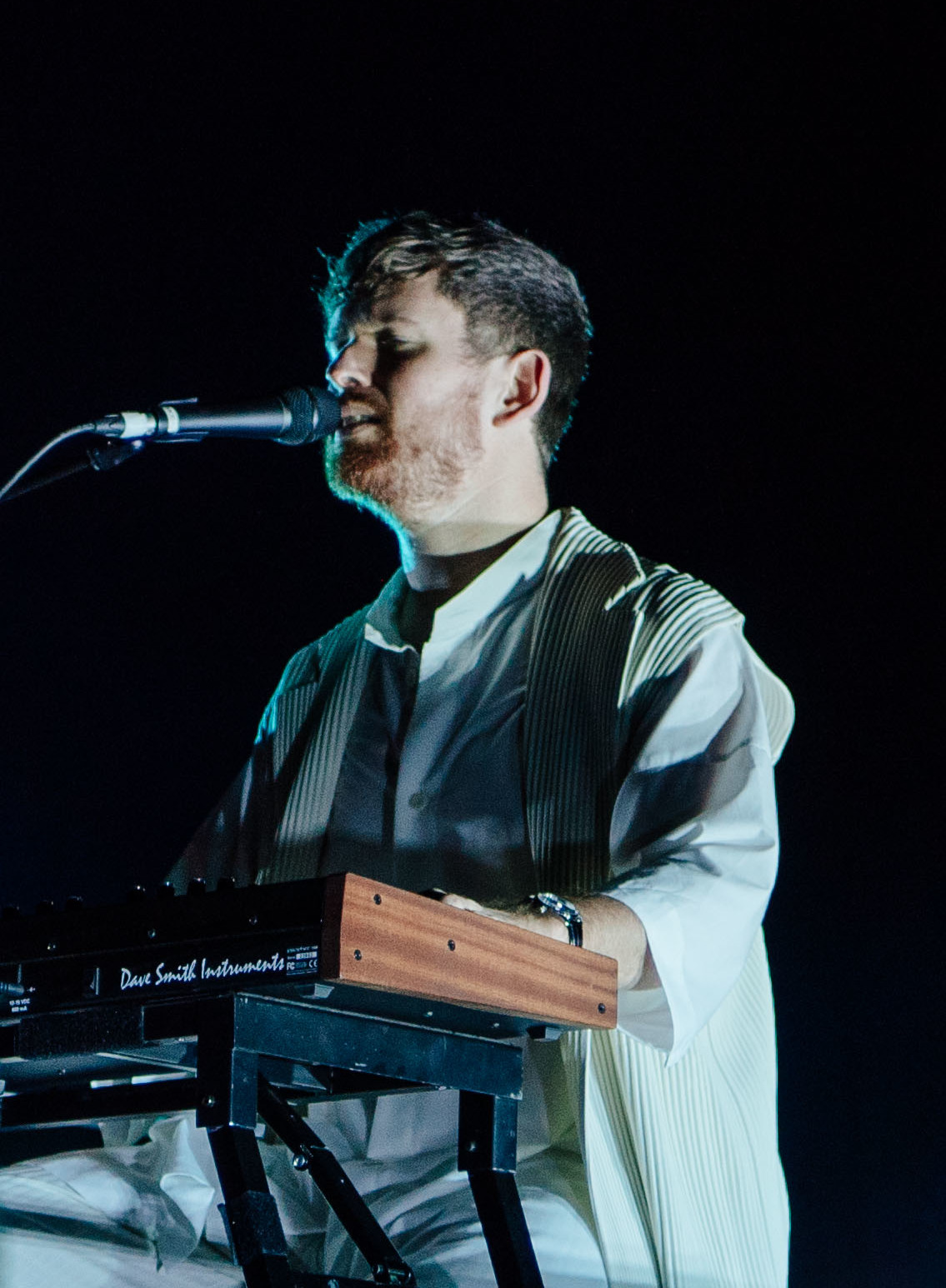
- Blake performing in 2021
- Studio albums: 9
- EPs: 9
- Singles: 42
- Music videos: 18

English singer-songwriter and record producer James Blake has released 7 studio albums, 2 collaborative albums, 9 extended plays, 42 singles and 18 music videos.

== Studio albums ==
Title	Album details	Peak chart positions										Certifications
Title	Album details	UK	AUS	BEL (FL)	DEN	FRA	GER	IRE	NL	SWI	US	Certifications
James Blake	Released: 4 February 2011; Label: ATLAS, A&M, Polydor; Formats: CD, digital download, vinyl	9	32	1	2	152	27	11	6	9	123	BPI: Silver; IFPI DEN: Gold
Overgrown	Released: 8 April 2013; Label: Polydor, Republic; Formats: CD, digital download, vinyl	8	5	12	2	62	13	24	32	16	32	BPI: Silver; IFPI DEN: Gold
The Colour in Anything	Released: 6 May 2016; Label: Polydor, Republic; Formats: CD, digital download, vinyl	13	16	18	21	93	76	16	20	19	36	
Assume Form	Released: 18 January 2019; Label: Polydor, Republic; Formats: CD, streaming, digital download, cassette, vinyl	6	22	4	7	60	27	18	17	9	21	
Friends That Break Your Heart	Released: 8 October 2021; Label: Polydor, Republic; Formats: CD, streaming, digital download, cassette, vinyl	4	61	11	15	62	19	80	29	14	75	
Playing Robots into Heaven	Released: 8 September 2023; Label: Polydor, Republic; Formats: CD, streaming, digital download, cassette, vinyl	— (Note: Playing Robots into Heaven did not enter the UK Albums Chart, but peaked at number 19 on the UK Album Downloads Chart.)	—	24	—	192	32	—	— (Note: Playing Robots into Heaven did not enter the Netherlands' Album Top 100 but peaked on the Netherlands' Vinyl Chart at number five.)	75	— (Note: Playing Robots into Heaven did not enter the Billboard 200, but peaked at number 35 on the US Top Album Sales chart.)	
Trying Times	Released: 13 March 2026; Label: Good Boy Records; Formats: CD, streaming, digital download, vinyl	3	35	3	—	42	7	—	16	18	— (Note: Trying Times did not enter the Billboard 200, but peaked at number 27 on the US Top Album Sales chart.)	
"—" denotes album that did not chart or was not released.

=== Collaborative albums ===
List of collaborative albums, with date released
Title	Album details	Peak chart positions
Title	Album details	BEL (FL)
Wind Down (with Endel)	Released: 18 March 2022; Label: Polydor, Republic; Formats: Streaming	—
Bad Cameo (with Lil Yachty)	Released: 28 June 2024; Label: Quality Control, Motown; Format: Streaming, digital download	198

== Extended plays ==
Title	Details	Peak chart positions				
Title	Details	UK Sales	UK Dance	UK Indie	SCO	US Sales
The Bells Sketch	Released: 8 March 2010; Label: Hessle; Formats: Vinyl, digital	—	—	—	—	14
CMYK	Released: 31 May 2010; Label: R&S; Formats: Vinyl, digital	— (Note: CMYK did not enter the UK Albums Chart, but peaked at number 27 on the UK Physical Singles Chart Top 100.)	38	32	—	—
Klavierwerke	Released: 27 September 2010; Label: R&S; Formats: Vinyl, digital	— (Note: Klavierwerke did not enter the UK Albums Chart, but peaked at number 40 on the UK Physical Singles Chart Top 100.)	—	49	—	—
Enough Thunder	Released: 7 October 2011; Label: ATLAS, Polydor; Formats: Vinyl, CD, digital	—	—	—	—	—
Love What Happened Here	Released: 6 December 2011; Label: R&S; Formats: Vinyl, digital	— (Note: Love What Happened Here did not enter the UK Albums Chart, but peaked at number 34 on the UK Physical Singles Chart Top 100.)	—	—	—	—
200 Press	Released: 8 December 2014; Label: 1-800 Dinosaur; Formats: Vinyl, digital	—	—	—	—	—
Before	Released: 14 October 2020; Label: Republic, Polydor; Formats: Vinyl, digital	— (Note: Before did not enter the UK Albums Chart, but peaked at number eight on the UK Physical Singles Chart Top 100.)	—	—	—	—
Covers	Released: 11 December 2020; Label: Republic, Polydor; Formats: Digital	55	—	—	81	—
CMYK 002	Released: 15 June 2024; Label: CMYK; Formats: Digital	—	—	—	—	—
"—" denotes a release that did not chart.

== Singles ==
=== As lead artist ===
Title	Year	Peak chart positions										Certifications	Album
Title	Year	UK	AUS	BEL (FL)	CAN	DEN	IRE	NL	NZ	POR	US	Certifications	Album
"Air & Lack Thereof"	2009	—	—	—	—	—	—	—	—	—	—		non-album single
"Limit to Your Love"	2010	39	—	5	—	3	—	7	—	—	—	IFPI DEN: Gold	James Blake
"The Wilhelm Scream"	2011	136	—	— (Note: "The Wilhelm Scream" did not enter the Flemish Ultratop chart, but peaked at number 14 on the Ultratip chart.)	—	—	—	—	—	—	—		James Blake
"Lindisfarne / Unluck"	2011	— (Note: "Lindisfarne / Unluck" did not enter the UK Singles Chart, but peaked at number 43 on the UK Physical Singles Chart Top 100.)	—	—	—	—	—	—	—	—	—		James Blake
"Order / Pan"	2011	—	—	—	—	—	—	—	—	—	—		non-album single
"Fall Creek Boys Choir" (with Bon Iver)	2011	—	—	—	—	—	—	—	—	—	—		Enough Thunder
"A Case of You"	2011	—	—	— (Note: "A Case of You" did not enter the Flemish Ultratop chart, but peaked at number 28 on the Ultratip chart.)	—	—	—	—	—	—	—		Enough Thunder
"Retrograde"	2013	87	56	— (Note: "Retrograde" did not enter the Flemish Ultratop chart, but peaked at number 38 on the Ultratip chart.)	—	10	—	—	—	46	—	ARIA: Gold; BPI: Gold; IFPI DEN: Gold; RMNZ: Gold	Overgrown
"Overgrown"	2013	—	—	—	—	—	—	—	—	—	—		Overgrown
"Life Round Here" (Remix) (featuring Chance the Rapper)	2013	—	—	—	—	—	—	—	—	—	—		non-album single
"Modern Soul"	2016	—	—	—	—	—	—	—	—	—	—		The Colour in Anything
"Timeless"	2016	—	—	—	—	—	—	—	—	—	—		The Colour in Anything
"Radio Silence"	2016	—	—	— (Note: "Radio Silence" did not enter the Flanders Ultratop 50, but charted as an extra tip on the Flanders Ultratip chart.)	—	—	—	—	—	—	—		The Colour in Anything
"My Willing Heart"	2016	—	—	—	—	—	—	—	—	—	—		The Colour in Anything
"I Need a Forest Fire" (featuring Bon Iver)	2016	195	—	— (Note: "I Need a Forest Fire" did not enter the Flanders Ultratop 50, but charted as an extra tip on the Flanders Ultratip chart.)	—	—	—	—	—	—	—	RMNZ: Gold	The Colour in Anything
"Timeless" (Remix) (featuring Vince Staples)	2016	—	—	—	—	—	—	—	—	—	—		non-album singles
"Vincent"	2017	—	—	—	—	—	—	—	—	—	—		non-album singles
"King's Dead" (with Jay Rock, Kendrick Lamar and Future)	2018	50	58	— (Note: "King's Dead" did not enter the Flanders Ultratop 50, but charted as an extra tip on the Flanders Ultratip chart.)	23	—	51	— (Note: "King's Dead" did not enter the Netherlands' Single Top 100 but peaked on the Netherlands' Single Tip Chart at number 6.)	— (Note: "King's Dead" did not enter the NZ Top 40 Singles Chart, but peaked at number four on the NZ Heatseekers Singles Chart.)	64	21	RIAA: 3× Platinum; MC: 2× Platinum; BPI: Gold	Black Panther: The Album and Redemption
"If the Car Beside You Moves Ahead"	2018	—	—	—	—	—	—	—	—	—	—		non-album single
"Don't Miss It"	2018	—	—	— (Note: "Don't Miss It" did not enter the Flanders Ultratop 50, but charted as an extra tip on the Flanders Ultratip chart.)	—	—	—	—	—	—	—		Assume Form
"Mile High" (featuring Travis Scott and Metro Boomin)	2019	47	—	— (Note: "Mile High" did not enter the Flemish Ultratop chart, but peaked at number 36 on the Ultratip chart.)	—	—	—	—	— (Note: "Mile High" did not enter the NZ Top 40 Singles Chart, but peaked at number nine on the NZ Hot Singles Chart.)	73	— (Note: "Mile High" did not enter the Billboard Hot 100, but peaked at number 22 on the Bubbling Under Hot 100 chart.)	RMNZ: Gold	Assume Form
"Lullaby for My Insomniac"	2019	—	—	—	—	—	—	—	—	—	—		Assume Form
"Barefoot in the Park" (featuring Rosalía)	2019	—	—	— (Note: "Barefoot in the Park" did not enter the Flemish Ultratop chart, but peaked at number 11 on the Ultratip chart.)	—	—	—	—	—	99	—		Assume Form
"Mulholland"	2019	—	—	—	—	—	—	—	—	—	—		Assume Form
"You're Too Precious"	2020	—	—	— (Note: "You're Too Precious" did not enter the Flemish Ultratop chart, but peaked at number 28 on the Ultratip chart.)	—	—	—	—	— (Note: "You're Too Precious" did not enter the NZ Top 40 Singles Chart, but peaked at number 21 on the NZ Hot Singles Chart.)	35	—		non-album singles
"Are You Even Real?"	2020	—	—	— (Note: "Are You Even Real?" did not enter the Flemish Ultratop chart, but peaked at number 29 on the Ultratip chart.)	—	—	—	—	— (Note: "Are You Even Real?" did not enter the NZ Top 40 Singles Chart, but peaked at number 28 on the NZ Hot Singles Chart.)	—	—		non-album singles
"Godspeed"	2020	—	—	— (Note: "Godspeed" did not enter the Flanders Ultratop 50, but charted as an extra tip on the Flanders Ultratip chart.)	—	—	—	—	— (Note: "Godspeed" did not enter the NZ Top 40 Singles Chart, but peaked at number 27 on the NZ Hot Singles Chart.)	—	—		Covers
"Before"	2020	— (Note: "Before" did not enter the UK Singles Chart, but peaked at number 8 on the UK Physical Singles Chart Top 100.)	—	— (Note: "Before" did not enter the Flemish Ultratop chart, but peaked at number 32 on the Ultratip chart.)	—	—	—	—	— (Note: "Before" did not enter the NZ Top 40 Singles Chart, but peaked at number 38 on the NZ Hot Singles Chart.)	—	—		Before
"The First Time Ever I Saw Your Face"	2020	— (Note: "The First Time Ever I Saw Your Face" did not enter the UK Singles Chart, but peaked at number 33 on the UK Single Sales Chart Top 100.)	—	— (Note: "The First Time Ever I Saw Your Face" did not enter the Flanders Ultratop 50, but charted as an extra tip on the Flanders Ultratip chart.)	—	—	—	—	—	—	—		Covers
"Say What You Will"	2021	—	—	—	—	—	—	—	—	—	—		Friends That Break Your Heart
"Life Is Not the Same"	2021	—	—	—	—	—	—	—	— (Note: "Life Is Not the Same" did not enter the NZ Top 40 Singles Chart, but peaked at number 40 on the NZ Hot Singles Chart.)	—	—		Friends That Break Your Heart
"Famous Last Words"	2021	—	—	—	—	—	—	—	—	—	—		Friends That Break Your Heart
"(Pick Me Up) Euphoria" (featuring Labrinth)	2022	—	—	—	—	—	—	—	—	—	—		Euphoria Season 2 (An HBO Original Series Soundtrack)
"Big Hammer"	2023	—	—	—	—	—	—	—	—	—	—		Playing Robots into Heaven
"Loading"	2023	—	—	—	—	—	—	—	—	—	—		Playing Robots into Heaven
"Kisses Make Sure" (with Strick featuring Young Thug)	2024	—	—	—	—	—	—	—	—	—	—		non-album singles
"Thrown Around"	2024	—	—	—	—	—	—	—	—	—	—		non-album singles
"Like the End"	2024	—	—	—	—	—	—	—	—	—	—		non-album singles
"Death of Love"	2026	—	—	—	—	—	—	—	— (Note: "Death of Love" did not enter the NZ Top 40 Singles Chart, but peaked at number 26 on the NZ Hot Singles Chart.)	—	—		Trying Times
"I Had a Dream She Took My Hand"	2026	—	—	—	—	—	—	—	—	—	—		Trying Times
"—" denotes a recording that did not chart or was not released in that territory.

=== As featured artist ===
Title	Year	Peak chart positions			Album
Title	Year	UK	BEL (FL)	NZ Hot	Album
"MaNyfaCedGod" (Jay-Z featuring James Blake)	2017	—	—	—	4:44
"We Go Home Together" (Mount Kimbie featuring James Blake)	2017	—	— (Note: "We Go Home Together" did not enter the Flanders Ultratop 50, but charted as an extra tip on the Flanders Ultratip chart..)	—	Love What Survives
"Feel Away" (Slowthai featuring Mount Kimbie and James Blake)	2020	92	—	34	Tyron
"—" denotes a recording that did not chart or was not released in that territory.

== Promotional singles ==
Title	Year	Peak chart positions				Album
Title	Year	UK	UK Indie	UK R&B	NZ Hot	Album
"Doesn't Just Happen" (featuring Dave)	2026	66	24	27	9	Trying Times

== Other charted songs ==
Title	Year	Peak chart positions										Certifications	Album
Title	Year	UK	AUS	CAN	FRA	GER	NL	NZ	POR	US	WW	Certifications	Album
"The Bells Sketch"	2010	—	—	—	—	—	—	—	—	— (Note: "The Bells Sketch" did not enter the Billboard Hot 100, but peaked at number 14 on the Hot Singles Sales chart.)	—		The Bells Sketch
"Forward" (Beyoncé featuring James Blake)	2016	85	—	—	151	—	—	—	—	63	—		Lemonade
"Bloody Waters" (with Ab-Soul and Anderson .Paak)	2018	98	—	—	—	—	—	—	—	— (Note: "Bloody Waters" did not enter the Billboard Hot 100, but peaked at number 16 on the Bubbling Under Hot 100 chart.)	—		Black Panther: The Album
"Stop Trying to Be God" (Travis Scott featuring Kid Cudi, James Blake, Philip Bailey and Stevie Wonder)	2018	70	87	19	76	100	94	—	39	27	—	BPI: Silver; ARIA: Gold; MC: Platinum; RIAA: Platinum	Astroworld
"Tell Them" (featuring Metro Boomin and Moses Sumney)	2019	—	—	—	—	—	—	― (Note: "Tell Them" did not enter the NZ Top 40 Singles Chart, but peaked at number 25 on the NZ Hot Singles Chart.)	—	—	—		Assume Form
"Into the Red"	2019	—	—	—	—	—	—	― (Note: "Into the Red" did not enter the NZ Top 40 Singles Chart, but peaked at number 25 on the NZ Hot Singles Chart.)	—	—	—		Assume Form
"Where's the Catch?" (featuring André 3000)	2019	—	—	—	—	—	—	― (Note: "Where's the Catch?" did not enter the NZ Top 40 Singles Chart, but peaked at number 28 on the NZ Hot Singles Chart.)	—	—	—		Assume Form
"Both Sides of a Smile" (Dave featuring James Blake)	2021	— (Note: "Both Sides of a Smile" did not enter the UK Singles Chart, but peaked at number 29 on the UK Audio Streaming Chart Top 100.)	—	—	—	—	—	—	—	—	—	BPI: Silver	We're All Alone in This Together
"Coming Back" (featuring SZA)	2021	—	—	—	—	—	—	— (Note: "Coming Back" did not enter the NZ Top 40 Singles Chart, but peaked at number 19 on the NZ Hot Singles Chart.)	—	—	—		Friends That Break Your Heart
"Diablo" (Rosalía featuring James Blake)	2022	—	—	—	—	—	—	—	184	—	—		Motomami
"Hummingbird" (with Metro Boomin)	2023	—	—	73	—	—	—	—	—	90	143		Spider-Man: Across the Spider-Verse (Soundtrack from and Inspired by the Motion Picture)
"Nonviolent Communication" (with Metro Boomin, ASAP Rocky, and 21 Savage)	2023	—	—	—	—	—	—	—	—	— (Note: "Nonviolent Communication" did not enter the Billboard Hot 100, but peaked at number 25 on the Bubbling Under Hot 100 chart.)	—		Spider-Man: Across the Spider-Verse (Soundtrack from and Inspired by the Motion Picture)
"Til Further Notice" (Travis Scott featuring James Blake and 21 Savage)	2023	— (Note: "Til Further Noticr" did not enter the UK Singles Chart, as chart rules only allow three songs per artist to chart within the top one hundred at a time, but peaked at number 98 on the UK Streaming Chart.)	52	33	86	—	—	39	55	38	42	BPI: Silver; RIAA: Gold; MC: Platinum	Utopia
"History" (Dave featuring James Blake)	2025	9	—	—	—	—	82	— (Note: "History" did not enter the NZ Top 40 Singles Chart, but peaked at number 19 on the NZ Hot Singles Chart.)	—	—	—		The Boy Who Played the Harp
"Selfish" (Dave featuring James Blake)	2025	— (Note: "Selfish" did not enter the UK Singles Chart, but peaked at number 32 on the UK Streaming Chart.)	—	—	—	—	—	— (Note: "Home" did not enter the NZ Top 40 Singles Chart, but peaked at number 32 on the NZ Hot Singles Chart.)	—	—	—		The Boy Who Played the Harp
"Trying Times"	2026	—	—	—	—	—	—	— (Note: "Trying Times" did not enter the NZ Top 40 Singles Chart, but peaked at number 17 on the NZ Hot Singles Chart.)	—	—	—		Trying Times
"When I'm Home" (with Ludwig Göransson and Travis Scott)	2026	—	—	—	—	—	—	— (Note: "When I'm Home" did not enter the NZ Top 40 Singles Chart, but peaked at number 21 on the NZ Hot Singles Chart.)	—	—	—		The Odyssey (Original Motion Picture Soundtrack)
"—" denotes a recording that did not chart or was not released in that territory.

== Guest appearances ==
List of non-single guest appearances, with other performing artists, showing year released and album name
Title	Year	Other artist(s)	Album
"Forward"	2016	Beyoncé	Lemonade
"(At Your Best) You Are Love"	2016	Frank Ocean	Endless
"The Ends"	2016	Travis Scott, André 3000	Birds in the Trap Sing McKnight
"How We Got By"	2017	Mount Kimbie	Love What Survives
"Look Ma No Hands"	2018	André 3000	Look Ma No Hands EP
"Momo's"	2018	Connan Mockasin	Jassbusters
"Still Stuff That Doesn't Happen"	2018	Oneohtrix Point Never	Age Of
"Stop Trying to Be God"	2018	Travis Scott, Kid Cudi, Philip Bailey, Stevie Wonder	Astroworld
"Universal Soldier"	2020	Jay Electronica	A Written Testimony
"Grieving"	2020	Kehlani	It Was Good Until It Wasn't
"Both Sides of a Smile"	2021	Dave	We're All Alone in This Together
"Diablo"	2022	Rosalía	Motomami
"Let Her Go"	2023	Don Toliver	Love Sick
"Lost Forever"	2023	Travis Scott, Westside Gunn	Utopia
"Til Further Notice"	2023	Travis Scott, 21 Savage	Utopia
"Tantrums"	2024	Normani	Dopamine
"History"	2025	Dave	The Boy Who Played the Harp
"Selfish"	2025	Dave	The Boy Who Played the Harp
"When I'm Home"	2026	Ludwig Göransson, Travis Scott	The Odyssey (Original Motion Picture Soundtrack)

as Harmonimix

- 2012: "Confidence Boost" – Harmonimix and Trimbal

== Remixes ==
Year	Artist	Song	Title
2009	Untold	"Stop What You're Doing"	James Blake Remix
2010	Mount Kimbie	"Maybes"	James Blake Remix
2010	Destiny's Child	"Bills, Bills, Bills"	James Blake Remix
2013	Mala	"Changes"	Harmonimix Remix
2013	Drake	"Come Thru"	James Blake Remix
2014	Beyoncé	"Drunk in Love"	Harmonimix Remix
2018	Moses Sumney	"Make Out in My Car"	James Blake Remix
2019	Khushi	"This Is, Pt. I"	James Blake Remix

== Production and songwriting credits ==
Year	Song	Artist	Album
2012	"Confidence Boost"	Untold	Sweat / Dante
2012	"Saying"	Untold	Sweat / Dante
2016	"Forward" (featuring James Blake)	Beyoncé	Lemonade
2016	"Pray You Catch Me"	Beyoncé	Lemonade
2016	"The Ends" (featuring André 3000)	Travis Scott	Birds in the Trap Sing McKnight
2016	"War Ready"	Vince Staples	Prima Donna
2016	"Big Time"	Vince Staples	Prima Donna
2016	"Nikes"	Frank Ocean	Blonde
2016	"Solo"	Frank Ocean	Blonde
2016	"Solo (Reprise)"	Frank Ocean	Blonde
2016	"Godspeed"	Frank Ocean	Blonde
2017	"Element"	Kendrick Lamar	Damn
2017	"Adnis"	Jay-Z	4:44
2017	"ManyFacedGod" (featuring James Blake)	Jay-Z	4:44
2018	"Momo's"	Connan Mockasin	Jassbusters
2019	"iMi"	Bon Iver	I, I
2020	"Flux Capacitor"	Jay Electronica	A Written Testimony
2020	"Lucky Me"	Moses Sumney	Græ
2020	"Legendary"	MikeQ & Ash B.	non-album single
2020	"Afterlife"	Flatbush Zombies	TBA
2021	"PANIC ROOM!"	JPEGMAFIA	EP2!
2021	"Stay Alive"	Mustafa	When Smoke Rises
2021	"Come Back"	Mustafa	When Smoke Rises
2022	"Diablo"	Rosalía	Motomami
2022	"Como un G"	Rosalía	Motomami
2022	"Dark Hearted"	Freddie Gibbs	$oul $old $eperately
2023	"Let Her Go" (featuring James Blake)	Don Toliver	Love Sick
2023	"Leave the Club" (featuring Lil Durk and GloRilla)	Don Toliver	Love Sick
2023	"Slow Motion" (featuring Wizkid)	Don Toliver	Love Sick
2023	"Hummingbird" (with James Blake)	Metro Boomin	Spider-Man: Across the Spider-Verse (Soundtrack from and Inspired by the Motion Picture)
2023	"Delresto (Echoes)" (with Beyoncé)	Travis Scott	Utopia
2023	"Lost Forever" (featuring Westside Gunn)	Travis Scott	Utopia
2023	"Til Further Notice" (featuring James Blake and 21 Savage)	Travis Scott	Utopia
2024	"Talking / Once Again" (featuring North West)	¥$ (Kanye West and Ty Dolla Sign)	Vultures 1
2024	"2-3 Zone"	Erick Arc Elliott	I've Never Been Here Before
2024	"Parkour"	Erick Arc Elliott	I've Never Been Here Before
2024	"Beef Patty" (featuring Boy Boy)	Erick Arc Elliott	I've Never Been Here Before
2025	"History"	Dave	The Boy Who Played the Harp
2025	"175 Months"	Dave	The Boy Who Played the Harp
2025	"Chapter 16"	Dave	The Boy Who Played the Harp
2025	"Selfish"	Dave	The Boy Who Played the Harp
2026	"This One Here"	Kanye West	Bully

== Music videos ==
Year	Title	Director
2010	"Limit to Your Love"	Martin de Thurah
2011	"The Wilhelm Scream"	Alexander Brown
2011	"Lindisfarne"	Martin de Thurah
2011	"A Case of You"	Seb Edwards
2013	"Retrograde"	Martin de Thurah
2013	"Overgrown"	Nabil
2013	"Voyeur"	Tobias Revell and Ferry Gouw
2013	"Life Round Here" (featuring Chance the Rapper)	Nabil
2016	"I Need a Forest Fire"	Matt Clark
2017	"My Willing Heart"	Anna Rose Holmer
2017	"Vincent" (Don McLean cover)	Andrew Douglas
2018	"If the Car Besides You Moves Ahead"	Alexander Brown
2019	"Barefoot in the Park" (featuring Rosalía)	Diana Kunst
2021	"Say What You Will"	Bear Damen
2021	"Funeral" (featuring Slowthai)	The Rest
2021	"Famous Last Words"	
2023	"Big Hammer"	Oscar Hudson
2024	"Thrown Around"	Will and Ed Reid

as Harmonimix

Year	Title	Director
2012	"Confidence Boost" (Harmonimix & Trim)	Rollo Jackson
