= List of songs written and produced by James Blake =

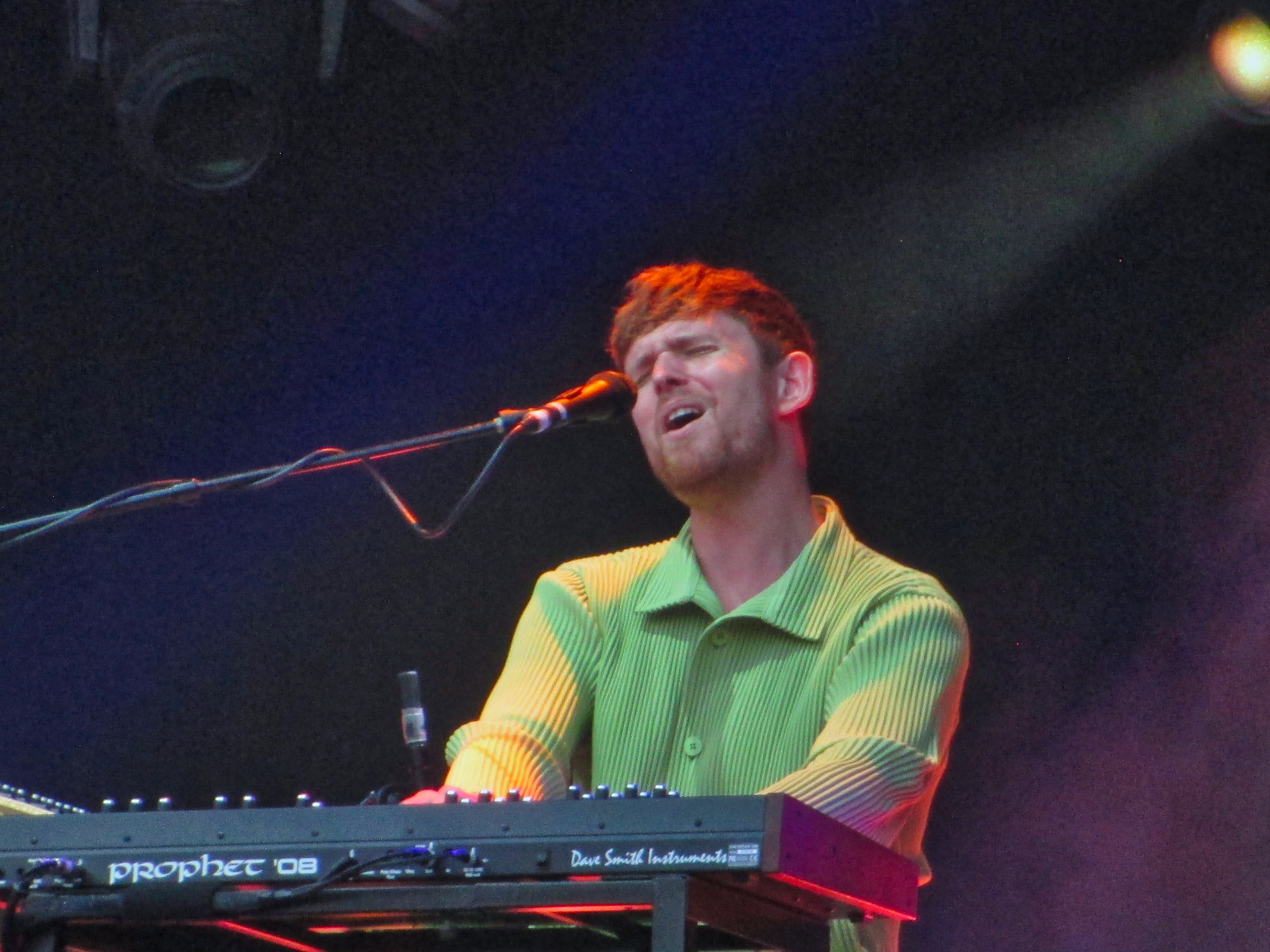
Blake performing in 2022

English singer-songwriter and record producer James Blake has recorded, written and produced for nine studio albums and nine extended plays. Apart from his own music, Blake also has written and produced for other artists, including Beyoncé, Frank Ocean, Kendrick Lamar, Jay-Z, Travis Scott, Rosalía, and Lil Yachty. British publication The Guardian named him as a "hip-hop's favourite Brit" producer.

== Songs ==
This is a list of song recordings written and/or produced by James Blake. All songs are released and recorded by James Blake, except where noted.

Song	Writers	Producers	Album	Year	Ref.
"(Pick Me Up) Euphoria" (James Blake featuring Labrinth)	James Blake; Labrinth	Labrinth	Euphoria Season 2 (An HBO Original Series Soundtrack)	2022	
"175 Months" (Dave)	David Omoregie; James Blake	Santan; James Blake (add.); Jo Caleb (add.); Jonny Leslie (add.)	The Boy Who Played the Harp	2025	
"2-3 Zone" (Erick the Architect)	Erick Arc Elliott; James Blake	James Blake	I've Never Been Here Before	2024	
"200 Press"	James Blake	James Blake	200 Press	2014	
"200 Pressure"	James Blake	James Blake	200 Press	2014	
"Adnis" (Jay-Z)	Shawn Carter; James Blake; Dion Wilson	James Blake; No I.D. (add.)	4:44	2017	
"Afterlife" (Flatbush Zombies with Erick the Architect and Zombie Juice)	James Blake; Erick Arc Elliott; Antonio Lewis; Demetri Simms	James Blake	Non-album single	2020	
"Age Of" (Oneohtrix Point Never)	Daniel Lopatin	Oneohtrix Point Never; James Blake (add.)	Age Of	2018	
"Air & Lack Thereof"	James Blake	James Blake	Non-album single	2009	
"Always"	James Blake	James Blake	The Colour in Anything	2016	
"Are You Even Real?"	James Blake; Ali Tamposi; Brittany Hazzard; Peter Lee Johnson	James Blake; Josh Stadlen	Non-album single	2020	
"Are You in Love?"	James Blake	James Blake; Jameela Jamil (add.)	Assume Form	2019	
"Asking to Break"	James Blake; Dominic Maker	James Blake; Dominic Maker (co.); Jameela Jamil (co.)	Playing Robots into Heaven	2023	
"Assume Form"	James Blake	James Blake; Dominic Maker (add.)	Assume Form	2019	
"At Birth"	James Blake	James Blake	Love What Happened Here	2011	
"Atmosphere"	Bernard Sumner; Peter Hook; Stephen Morris; Ian Curtis	James Blake	Covers	2020	
"Babylon" (Oneohtrix Point Never)	Daniel Lopatin	Oneohtrix Point Never; James Blake (add.)	Age Of	2018	
"Bad Cameo" (James Blake and Lil Yachty)	James Blake; Miles Parks McCollum; Dominic Maker; Benjamin Saint Fort; Jeremiah Raisen	James Blake; Dominic Maker; Lil Yachty (add.); Bnyx (add.); Sadpony (add.)	Bad Cameo	2024	
"Barefoot in the Park" (James Blake featuring Rosalía)	James Blake; Rosalía Vila Tobella; Paco Ortega	James Blake; Dominic Maker (add.)	Assume Form	2019	
"Beef Patty" (Erick the Architect featuring Boy Boy)	Erick Arc Elliott; James Blake; Boy Boy	James Blake	I've Never Been Here Before	2024	
"Before"	James Blake; Dominic Maker	James Blake; Dominic Maker (co.); Jameela Jamil (add.)	Before	2020	
"Big Hammer"	James Blake; David Steven Destouche; Trevor Paul Destouche	James Blake; Rob McAndrews (add.)	Playing Robots into Heaven	2023	
"Big Time" (Vince Staples)	James Blake; Vince Staples	James Blake	Prima Donna	2016	
"Black Snow" (Oneohtrix Point Never)	Daniel Lopatin	Oneohtrix Point Never; James Blake (add.)	Age Of	2018	
"Bloody Waters" (Ab-Soul, Anderson .Paak and James Blake)	Herbert Stevens IV; Brandon Anderson; James Blake; Kendrick Duckworth; Mark Spears; Robin Braun	Sounwave; Kendrick Lamar; Robin Hannibal	Black Panther: The Album	2018	
"Both Sides of a Smile" (Dave featuring James Blake)	David Omoregie; James Blake	James Blake; Kyle Evans (add.); Dominic Maker (add.)	We're All Alone in This Together	2021	
"Building It Still"	James Blake	James Blake	200 Press	2014	
"Buzzard & Kestrel"	James Blake	James Blake	The Bells Sketch	2010	
"Can't Believe the Way We Flow"	James Blake; Roger Joyce; Victoria Pike; Teddy Randazzo	James Blake; Dominic Maker (co.); Daniel Lopatin (add.)	Assume Form	2019	
"Chapter 16" (Dave featuring Kano)	David Omoregie; James Blake; Kane Robinson	Santan; James Blake; Jo Caleb (add.)	The Boy Who Played the Harp	2025	
"Choose Me"	James Blake	James Blake	The Colour in Anything	2016	
"CMYK"	James Blake	James Blake	CMYK	2010	
"Come Back" (Mustafa)	Mustafa Ahmed; Adam Feeney; James Blake	Frank Dukes; James Blake	When Smoke Rises	2021	
"Coming Back" (James Blake featuring SZA)	James Blake; Brittany Hazzard; Dominic Maker; Jameela Jamil; Kalim Patel; Solána Rowe	James Blake; Dominic Maker; Jameela Jamil (add.); Khushi (add.)	Friends That Break Your Heart	2021	
"Como un G" (Rosalía)	Rosalía Vila Tobella; Pablo Díaz-Reixa; James Blake; Adam Feeney; M1SHKA; Noah Goldstein; David Rodríguez	Frank Dukes; El Guincho; Rosalía; Noah Goldstein; David Rodríguez; Nick León; James Blake; Dylan Patrice	Motomami	2022	
"Curbside"	James Blake	James Blake	Love What Happened Here	2011	
"Dark Hearted" (Freddie Gibbs)	Freddie Gibbs; Ben "Lambo" Lambert; Norma "Va" Denton; James Blake	James Blake; Edgar JV Etienne (co.); Harmony Samuels (add.); Kyle Evans (add.)	Soul Sold Separately	2022	
"Days Go By"	James Blake; Dylan Mills	James Blake; Dominic Maker; Jameela Jamil; Bob MacKenzie (add.); Josh Stadlen (add.); Khushi (add.)	Trying Times	2026	
"Death of Love"	James Blake; Leonard Cohen; Patrick Leonard	James Blake; Jameela Jamil; Dominic Maker (add.)	Trying Times	2026	
"Delresto (Echoes)" (Beyoncé and Travis Scott)	Beyoncé; Jacques Webster; Justin Vernon; James Blake; Chauncey Hollis Jr. Mike Dean; Allen Ritter	Travis Scott; Hit-Boy (add.); Mike Dean (add.); Allen Ritter (add.)	Utopia	2023	
"Diablo" (Rosalía)	Rosalía Vila Tobella; Pablo Díaz-Reixa; James Blake; Adam Feeney; Michael Uzowuru; Noah Goldstein; David Rodríguez	Frank Dukes; El Guincho; Rosalía; Noah Goldstein; David Rodríguez; Nick León	Motomami	2022	
"Didn't Come to Argue" (James Blake featuring Monica Martin)	James Blake; James Dent Dotson; Monica Martin	James Blake; Dominic Maker; Jameela Jamil; Khushi (add.)	Trying Times	2026	
"Digital Lion"	James Blake; Brian Eno; Rob McAndrews	James Blake	Overgrown	2013	
"DLM"	James Blake	James Blake	Overgrown	2013	
"Doesn't Just Happen" (James Blake featuring Dave)	James Blake; David Omoregie; Dominic Maker; Roméo Testa	James Blake; Dominic Maker; Jameela Jamil; YouthXL; Bob MacKenzie (add.)	Trying Times	2026	
"Don't Co-Write"	James Blake; Jason Lader; Dominic Maker	James Blake; Jason Lader; Dominic Maker	CMYK 002	2024	
"Don't Judge Me" (SWAVAY)	Andre Jones; James Blake; Edward Maclin Cooper III; Delvin Northcut; Josh Stadlen	James Blake; Coupe; 20 Rocket; Josh Stadlen	ALMETHA'S SON	2022	
"Don't Miss It"	James Blake	James Blake; Dominic Maker (co.)	Assume Form	2019	
"Don't You Think I Do"	James Blake	James Blake	Klavierwerke	2010	
"Do You Ever"	James Blake; Nico Muhly	James Blake	Before	2020	
"Dream (Move My Feet)"	James Blake	James Blake	CMYK 002	2024	
"Element" (Kendrick Lamar)	Kendrick Duckworth; Mark Spears; James Blake; Ricci Riera	Sounwave; James Blake; Ricci Riera; Tae Beast (add.); Bekon (add.)	Damn	2017	
"Enough Thunder"	James Blake	James Blake	Enough Thunder	2011	
"Every Day I Ran"	James Blake	James Blake	Overgrown	2013	
"f.o.r.e.v.e.r."	James Blake	James Blake	The Colour in Anything	2016	
"Fall Back"	James Blake; Brittany Hazzard; James Sencherey-Evans	James Blake	Playing Robots into Heaven	2023	
"Fall Creek Boys Choir" (James Blake with Bon Iver)	James Blake; Justin Vernon	James Blake; Justin Vernon	Enough Thunder	2011	
"Famous Last Words"	James Blake	James Blake; Dominic Maker (add.); Jameela Jamil (add.)	Friends That Break Your Heart	2021	
"Feel Away" (Slowthai with James Blake and Mount Kimbie)	Tyron Frampton; Dominic Maker; James Blake; Dave Hall; Mariah Carey	Dominic Maker	Tyron	2021	
"Feel It Again"	James Blake	James Blake; Dominic Maker (add.); Jameela Jamil (add.)	Trying Times	2026	
"Fire the Editor"	James Blake; Rob McAndrews	James Blake; Rob McAndrews (co.); Jameela Jamil (add.)	Playing Robots into Heaven	2023	
"Flux Capacitor" (Jay Electronica)	Elpadaro Allah; Shawn Carter; Robyn Fenty; Dion Wilson; Badriia Bourelly; James Fauntleroy; Jerry Butler II; Kenneth Gamble; Leon Huff; Lawrence Parker; Elton Newman; D'Artanian Stovall; Tyron Cosey	Jay Electronica; James Blake (add.)	A Written Testimony	2020	
"Focus" (Slowthai)	Tyron Frampton; Dominic Maker; James Blake; Kenny Beats	Dominic Maker; Kenny Beats	Tyron	2021	
"Foot Forward"	James Blake; Ali Tamposi; Leland Wayne; Adam Feeney; Barry Mann; Dan Hill	James Blake; Metro Boomin; Frank Dukes; Dominic Maker (add.); Jameela Jamil (add.)	Friends That Break Your Heart	2021	
"Footnotes"	James Blake	James Blake	CMYK	2010	
"Foreign"	James Blake	James Blake	CMYK 002	2024	
"Forward" (Beyoncé featuring James Blake)	Beyoncé; James Blake	Beyoncé; James Blake	Lemonade	2016	
"Friends" (SWAVAY)	Andre Jones; James Blake; Edward Maclin Cooper III; Delvin Northcut; Jeffrey Lawrence Shannon; Sterling White, Jr.	James Blake; Coupe; Juberlee; 20 Rocket; Spiff Sinatra	ALMETHA'S SON	2022	
"Friends That Break Your Heart"	James Blake; Rick Nowels	James Blake; Rick Nowels	Friends That Break Your Heart	2021	
"From Down Here" (Lola Young)	Lola Young; James Blake; Dominic Maker; Jameela Jamil	James Blake; Dominic Maker; Jameela Jamil	TBA	2026	
"Frozen" (James Blake featuring JID and SwaVay)	James Blake; Destin Choice Route; Andre Jones	James Blake; Jameela Jamil (add.)	Friends That Break Your Heart	2021	
"Funeral"	James Blake	James Blake; Khushi (add.)	Friends That Break Your Heart	2021	
"Give a Man a Rod"	James Blake	James Blake	The Bells Sketch	2010	
"Give Me My Month"	James Blake	James Blake	James Blake	2011	
"Godspeed" (Note: "Godspeed" also was recorded by Blake for his 2020 extended play, Covers.) (Frank Ocean)	Frank Ocean; James Ho	Frank Ocean; Om'Mas Keith; Malay; James Blake	Blonde; Covers	2016; 2020	
"Grieving" (Kehlani featuring James Blake)	Kehlani Parrish; James Blake; Matthew Samuels; Johann Deterville	Boi-1da; Jahaan Sweet; The Rascals; YogiTheProducer	It Was Good Until It Wasn't	2020	
"He's Been Wonderful"	James Blake; T. L. Barrett	James Blake	Playing Robots into Heaven	2023	
"Heart Attack" (Dave)	David Omoregie; James Blake; Joe Reeves	Dave; Joe Reeves; James Blake (add.)	We're All Alone in This Together	2021	
"Herbert" (Ab-Soul)	Herbert Anthony Stevens IV; Kendrick Duckworth; James Blake; Jake Kosich; Johnny Kosich; Matthew Schaeffer	James Blake; Beach Noise	Herbert	2022	
"History" (Dave featuring James Blake)	David Omoregie; James Blake	Dominic Maker; James Blake	The Boy Who Played the Harp	2025	
"How We Got By" (Mount Kimbie featuring James Blake)	Dominic Maker; Kai Campos; James Blake	Dominic Maker; Kai Campos	Love What Survives	2017	
"Hummingbird" (Metro Boomin with James Blake)	Leland Wayne; James Blake; Andre Proctor; Dominic Maker; Billy Rose; David Lee	Metro Boomin; James Blake; Dre Moon; Dominic Maker	Metro Boomin Presents Spider-Man: Across the Spider-Verse (Soundtrack from and Inspired by the Motion Picture)	2023	
"I Am Sold"	James Blake	James Blake	Overgrown	2013	
"I Had a Dream She Took My Hand"	James Blake; Dominic Maker; Joseph Quiñones	James Blake; Chris Trowbridge; Dominic Maker; Jameela Jamil (add.); Josh Stadlen (add.)	Trying Times	2026	
"I Hope My Life (1-800 Mix)"	James Blake	James Blake	The Colour in Anything	2016	
"I Keep Calling"	James Blake; Dominic Maker; Erick Arc Elliott; Josh Stadlen; Kalim Graham Patel; Charlotte Day Wilson; Matthew Tavares; Thomas Paxton-Beesley	James Blake; Dominic Maker (co.); Erick the Architect (add.); Jameela Jamil (add.); Josh Stadlen (add.); Kushi (add.)	Before	2020	
"I Mind"	James Blake	James Blake	James Blake	2011	
"I Need a Forest Fire" (James Blake featuring Bon Iver)	James Blake; Justin Vernon	James Blake	The Colour in Anything	2016	
"I Never Learnt to Share"	James Blake	James Blake	James Blake	2011	
"I Only Know (What I Know Now)"	James Blake	James Blake	Klavierwerke	2010	
"I Want You to Know"	James Blake; Calvin Cordozar Broadus Jr. Chad Hugo; Pharrell Williams; James Sencherey-Evans	James Blake; Dominic Maker (add.); Rob McAndrews (add.); Khushi (add.)	Playing Robots into Heaven	2023	
"I'll Come Too"	James Blake; Bruno Nicolai	James Blake; Dominic Maker (co.); Jameela Jamil (add.)	Assume Form	2019	
"I'll Stay"	James Blake	James Blake	CMYK	2010	
"I'm So Blessed You're Mine"	James Blake; Dominic Maker; Jameela Jamil; Kalim Patel	James Blake; Khushi; Dominic Maker (add.); Jameela Jamil (add.); Josh Stadlen (add.)	Friends That Break Your Heart	2021	
"If I'm Insecure"	James Blake; Nico Muhly	James Blake; Jameela Jamil (add.)	Friends That Break Your Heart	2021	
"If the Car Beside You Moves Ahead"	James Blake	James Blake; Dominic Maker (co.)	Assume Form	2019	
"If You Can Hear Me"	James Blake; Dominic Maker	James Blake; Dominic Maker (co.)	Playing Robots into Heaven	2023	
"iMi" (Bon Iver)	Justin Vernon; James Blake; Rob Moose; Brad Cook; Mike Lewis; Mike Noyce; BJ Burton; Jeremy Nutzman; Channy Leaneagh; Wesley Glass; Josh Berg	Chris Messina; Brad Cook; Justin Vernon; BJ Burton (add.); Andrew Sarlo (add.)	I, I	2019	
"In Grey" (James Blake and Lil Yachty)	James Blake; Miles Parks McCollum	James Blake; Lil Yachty (add.)	Bad Cameo	2024	
"In the Fire" (Dave)	David Omoregie; Kyle Evans; James Blake; Dominic Maker; Marvin Bailey; Nathaniel Thompson; Justin Clarke; Mico Howles; Milton Biggham	Dave; James Blake (co.); Kyle Evans (add.); Dominic Maker (add.)	We're All Alone in This Together	2021	
"Into the Red"	James Blake	James Blake; Dominic Maker (co.); Jameela Jamil (add.)	Assume Form	2019	
"Intro" (SWAVAY featuring James Blake)	Andre Jones; James Blake; Edward Maclin Cooper III	Coupe	ALMETHA'S SON	2022	
"Just a Little Higher"	James Blake	James Blake; Dominic Maker; Jameela Jamil	Trying Times	2026	
"King's Dead" (Jay Rock, Kendrick Lamar, Future and James Blake)	Johnny McKinzie; Kendrick Duckworth; Nayvadius Wilburn; James Blake; Michael Williams II; Travis Walton; Mark Spears; Samuel Gloade; Antwon Hicks; Axel Morgan	Sounwave; Mike Will Made It; Teddy Walton; 30 Roc; Twon Beatz; Axlfolie	Black Panther: The Album	2018	
"KISSES MAKE SURE" (Strick and James Blake featuring Young Thug)	James Blake; Tauren Strickland; Jeffery Williams; Bryan Yepes	Neenyo; Bryan Yepes	Non-album single	2024	
"Klavierwerke"	James Blake	James Blake	Klavierwerke	2010	
"Last Known Image of a Song" (Oneohtrix Point Never)	Daniel Lopatin	Oneohtrix Point Never; James Blake (add.)	Age Of	2018	
"Lauder Too" (JID featuring Ravyn Lenae and Eryn Allen Kane)	Destin Route; Ravyn Lenae; James Blake; Benjamin Tolbert; Ahmanti Booker; Leon Sylvers III; Edmund Sylvers	James Blake; Groove (add.); Monte Booker (add.)	The Forever Story	2022	
"Leave the Club" (Don Toliver featuring GloRilla and Lil Durk)	Caleb Toliver; Gloria Woods; Durk Banks; Dylan Clearly-Kell; Anthony Holmes Jr. Ciaran Mullan; Ozan Yildirim; James Blake	Dez Wright; Hitkidd; Mu Lean; Oz; James Blake	Love Sick	2023	
"Legendary" (MikeQ with Ash B.)	Michael Cox; Ashley Byrd; James Blake	MikeQ; James Blake	Non-album single	2020	
"Let Her Go" (Don Toliver featuring James Blake)	Caleb Toliver; James Blake; Derek Anderson; Dylan Cleary-Krell	206derek Dez Wright; James Blake	Love Sick	2023	
"Let Her Know"	James Blake; Rob McAndrews; Dominic Maker	James Blake; Rob McAndrews; Dominic Maker; No I.D. (add.)	CMYK 002	2024	
"Life Is Not the Same"	James Blake; David Biral; Denzel Baptiste; George Miller	James Blake; Take a Daytrip; Joji; Khushi (add.)	Friends That Break Your Heart	2021	
"Life Round Here" (Note: The remix version of "Life Round Here" features Chance the Rapper, released in 2014.)	James Blake; Chancelor Bennett	James Blake	Overgrown	2013	
"Like The End"	James Blake	James Blake; Rob McAndrews; Josh Stadlen; Dominic Maker	Non-album single	2024	
"Limit to Your Love"	Leslie Feist; Chilly Gonzales	James Blake	James Blake	2010	
"Lindisfarne I"	James Blake	James Blake	James Blake	2011	
"Lindisfarne II"	James Blake	James Blake; Rob McAndrews	James Blake	2011	
"Loading"	James Blake; Dominic Maker; Chris Trowbridge; Judie Tzuke; Mike Paxman	James Blake; Dominic Maker (co.); Rob McAndrews (add.); Jameela Jamil (add.)	Playing Robots into Heaven	2023	
"Look Me In the Eyes" (Rex Orange County featuring James Blake)	Alexander O'Connor; James Blake	Alexander O'Connor; James Blake	The Alexander Technique	2024	
"Lost Angel Nights"	James Blake; Dominic Maker; Ali Tamposi	James Blake; Dominic Maker (add.); Jameela Jamil (add.); Khushi (add.)	Friends That Break Your Heart	2021	
"Lost Forever" (Travis Scott)	Jacques Webster; James Blake; Alvin Worthy; Alan Maman; Dominic Maker; Douglas Ford	Travis Scott; James Blake; The Alchemist; Dominic Maker	Utopia	2023	
"Love Me in Whatever Way"	James Blake	James Blake; Rick Rubin	The Colour in Anything	2016	
"Love What Happened Here"	James Blake	James Blake	Love What Happened Here	2011	
"Lullaby for My Insomniac"	James Blake	James Blake	Assume Form	2019	
"Lucky Me" (Moses Sumney)	Moses Sumney; James Blake	Moses Sumney; James Blake (add.); Daniel Lopatin (add.)	græ	2020	
"Make Something Up"	James Blake; P. Weston	James Blake; Dominic Maker; Khushi (add.)	Trying Times	2026	
"MaNyfaCedGod" (Jay-Z featuring James Blake)	Shawn Carter; Dion Wilson; James Blake; Dominic Maker; Sylvia Robinson; Michael Burton; Dwight T. Ross; Jerry Peters; Anita Poree; Beyoncé; Justin Timberlake; Terius Nash; Timothy Mosley; Mike Dean; Jerome Harmon; Dwane Weir	James Blake; Dominic Maker; No I.D. (add.)	4:44	2017	
"Measurements"	James Blake	James Blake	James Blake	2011	
"Meet You in the Maze"	James Blake; Justin Vernon	James Blake; Justin Vernon	The Colour in Anything	2016	
"Midnight" (James Blake and Lil Yachty)	James Blake; Miles Parks McCollum; Dominic Maker; Daniel Worrall Jacobs	James Blake; Dominic Maker; Lil Yachty (add.)	Bad Cameo	2024	
"Mile High" (James Blake featuring Travis Scott and Metro Boomin)	James Blake; Jacques Webster II; Leland Wayne	James Blake; Metro Boomin; Dre Moon; Wavy	Assume Form	2019	
"Missing Man" (James Blake and Lil Yachty)	James Blake; Miles Parks McCollum; Dominic Maker	James Blake; Dominic Maker; Lil Yachty (add.)	Bad Cameo	2024	
"Modern Soul"	James Blake	James Blake; Rick Rubin	The Colour in Anything	2016	
"Momo's" (Connan Mockasin)	Connan Mockasin; James Blake	Connan Mockasin; Matthew Eccles; Nicholas Harsant; Rory McCarthy; Renaud Letang	Jassbusters	2018	
"Mulholland"	James Blake	James Blake	Assume Form	2019	
"My Willing Heart"	James Blake; Frank Ocean	James Blake	The Colour in Anything	2016	
"myriad.industries" (Oneohtrix Point Never)	Daniel Lopatin	Oneohtrix Point Never; James Blake (add.)	Age Of	2018	
"Never Dreamed You'd Leave in Summer"	Stevie Wonder; Syreeta Wright	James Blake	Covers	2020	
"Night Sky"	James Blake; Rob McAndrews	James Blake	Playing Robots into Heaven	2023	
"No Blame" (Baby Keem)	Cydel Young; Floyd Hills; Hykeem Carter; James Blake; Mark Williams; Ruchaun Akers; Raul Cubina	Baby Keem; Danja; Ojivolta; Scott Bridgeway	Ca$ino	2026	
"Noise Above Our Heads"	James Blake	James Blake; Rick Rubin	The Colour in Anything	2016	
"Nonviolent Communication" (Metro Boomin with James Blake, ASAP Rocky and 21 Savage)	Leland Wayne; James Blake; Rakim Mayers; Shéyaa Abraham-Joseph; Andre Proctor; Shakari Boles	Metro Boomin; Dre Moon; TrakGirl	Metro Boomin Presents Spider-Man: Across the Spider-Verse (Soundtrack from and Inspired by the Motion Picture)	2023	
"Not Long Now"	James Blake	James Blake	Enough Thunder	2011	
"Once We All Agree"	James Blake	James Blake	Enough Thunder	2011	
"Obsession"	James Blake	James Blake; Dominic Maker (add.); Jameela Jamil (add.)	Trying Times	2026	
"Order"	James Blake	James Blake	Non-album single	2011	
"Our Love Comes Back"	James Blake	James Blake	Overgrown	2013	
"Overgrown"	James Blake	James Blake	Overgrown	2013	
"Pan"	James Blake	James Blake	Non-album single	2011	
"Panic Room" (JPEGMafia)	Barrington Hendricks	JPEGMafia; James Blake	EP2!	2021	
"Parkour" (Erick the Architect)	Erick Arc Elliott; James Blake	James Blake	I've Never Been Here Before	2024	
"Playing Robots into Heaven"	James Blake	James Blake	Playing Robots into Heaven	2023	
"Points"	James Blake	James Blake; Rick Rubin	The Colour in Anything	2016	
"Postpone"	James Blake	James Blake	CMYK	2010	
"Power On"	James Blake	James Blake; Dominic Maker (co.); Jameela Jamil (add.)	Assume Form	2019	
"Pray4DaGang" (ASAP Rocky featuring KayCyy)	Rakim Mayers; James Blake; Carlton McDowell; Dacoury Natche; Jordan Brooks; Kalim Patel; Masamune Kudo	James Blake; Khushi; Dominic Maker	Don't Be Dumb	2025	
"Pray You Catch Me" (Beyoncé)	Kevin Garrett; Beyoncé; James Blake	Kevin Garrett; Beyoncé; Jeremy McDonald	Lemonade	2016	
"Put That Away and Talk to Me"	James Blake	James Blake	The Colour in Anything	2016	
"Radio Silence"	James Blake	James Blake	The Colour in Anything	2016	
"RayCats" (Oneohtrix Point Never)	Daniel Lopatin	Oneohtrix Point Never; James Blake (add.)	Age Of	2018	
"Red Carpet" (James Blake and Lil Yachty)	James Blake; Miles Parks McCollum	James Blake; Lil Yachty (add.)	Bad Cameo	2024	
"Rest of Your Life"	James Blake; Alan Bergman; Marilyn Bergman; Michel Legrand	James Blake; Dominic Maker; Jameela Jamil	Trying Times	2026	
"Retrograde"	James Blake	James Blake	Overgrown	2013	
"Run Away from the Rabbit" (James Blake and Lil Yachty)	James Blake; Miles Parks McCollum; Dominic Maker	James Blake; Dominic Maker; Lil Yachty (add.)	Bad Cameo	2024	
"Same" (Oneohtrix Point Never)	Daniel Lopatin	Oneohtrix Point Never; James Blake (add.)	Age Of	2018	
"Save the Savior" (James Blake and Lil Yachty)	James Blake; Miles Parks McCollum; Dominic Maker	James Blake; Dominic Maker; Lil Yachty (add.)	Bad Cameo	2024	
"Say What You Will"	James Blake; Dominic Maker; Josh Stadlen	James Blake; Dominic Maker (co.); Jameela Jamil (add.); Josh Stadlen (add.)	Friends That Break Your Heart	2021	
"Scientists & Engineers" (Killer Mike with André 3000 featuring Future and Eryn Allen Kane)	Michael Render; Paul Beauregard; James Blake; Tim Moore; Dion Wilson	André 3000; DJ Paul; James Blake; No I.D. Twhy Xclusive	Michael	2023	
"Séance" (James Blake and Ludwig Göransson)	James Blake; Ludwig Göransson	Ludwig Göransson	Sinners (Original Motion Picture Soundtrack)	2025	
"Selfish" (Dave featuring James Blake)	David Omoregie; James Blake	Santan; James Blake (add.); Jo Caleb (add.); Jonny Leslie (add.)	The Boy Who Played the Harp	2025	
"Shift in Behavior" (SWAVAY and James Blake)	André Jones	James Blake; SWAVAY; Dominic Maker	Non-album single	2024	
"Show Me" (James Blake featuring Monica Martin)	James Blake; Dominic Maker; Monica Martin	James Blake; Dominic Maker; Jameela Jamil (add.); Khushi (add.)	Friends That Break Your Heart	2021	
"Sistanem" (JID)	Destin Route; Kameron Cole; John Welch; Taalib Johnson; Osunlade; Eric Roberson; James Blake	Hollywood Cole; Christo; Yuli	The Forever Story	2022	
"Slow Motion" (Don Toliver featuring Wizkid)	Caleb Toliver; Ayodeji Balogun; James Blake; Bryan Yepes; Rupert Thomas Jr.	Bryvn; James Blake; Sevn Thomas	Love Sick	2023	
"Solo" (Frank Ocean)	Frank Ocean; James Ho	Frank Ocean; James Blake	Blonde	2016	
"Solo (Reprise)" (Frank Ocean)	André Benjamin; James Blake; Frank Ocean	Frank Ocean; James Blake; Jon Brion	Blonde	2016	
"Sparing the Horses"	James Blake	James Blake	Non-album single	2009	
"Stay Alive" (Mustafa)	Mustafa Ahmed cityboymoe Adam Feeney; Simon Hessman	Frank Dukes; James Blake (co.); Simon Hessman (add.)	When Smoke Rises	2021	
"Still Stuff That Doesn't Happen" (Oneohtrix Point Never)	Daniel Lopatin	Oneohtrix Point Never; James Blake (add.)	Age Of	2018	
"Stop Trying to Be God" (Travis Scott)	Jacques Webster; James Blake; Mike Dean; Kevin Gomringer; Tim Gomringer; Joshua Adams	Travis Scott; J Beatzz; Mike Dean; Cubeatz (add.)	Astroworld	2018	
"Summer of Now"	James Blake	James Blake; Dominic Maker (add.); Jameela Jamil (add.)	Before	2020	
"Take a Fall for Me" (James Blake featuring RZA)	James Blake	James Blake	Overgrown	2013	
"Talking / Once Again" (¥$–Kanye West and Ty Dolla Sign featuring North West)	Ye; Tyrone Griffin, Jr. Anthony Clemons, Jr. Darhyl Camper, Jr. Dominic Maker; Edward Davadi; James Blake; Kasseem Dean; North West; Quentin Miller; Shawntoni Nichols	Ye; Ty Dolla Sign; Camper; Dom Maker; Edsclusive; James Blake; Swizz Beatz	Vultures 1	2024	
"Tantrums" (Normani featuring James Blake)	Normani; Brittany Hazzard; Darius Coleman; James Blake; Steven Franks; Tommy Brown	Tommy Brown; James Blake; Mr. Franks	Dopamine	2024	
"Tell Her Safe"	James Blake	James Blake	Klavierwerke	2010	
"Tell Me"	James Blake; Rob McAndrews	James Blake; Rob McAndrews (co.); Dominic Maker (add.)	Playing Robots into Heaven	2023	
"Tell Them" (James Blake featuring Moses Sumney and Metro Boomin)	James Blake; Moses Sumney; Leland Wayne; Allen Ritter	James Blake; Metro Boomin; Dre Moon; Allen Ritter; Dominic Maker (add.); Jameela Jamil (add.)	Assume Form	2019	
"Tep and the Logic"	James Blake	James Blake	James Blake	2011	
"The Bells Sketch"	James Blake	James Blake	The Bells Sketch	2010	
"The Colour in Anything"	James Blake	James Blake	The Colour in Anything	2016	
"The First Time Ever I Saw Your Face"	Ewan MacColl	James Blake	Covers	2020	
"The Station" (Oneohtrix Point Never)	Daniel Lopatin	Oneohtrix Point Never; James Blake (add.)	Age Of	2018	
"The Wilhelm Scream"	James Litherland; James Blake	James Blake	James Blake	2011	
"This One Here" (Kanye West)	Caleb Toliver; James Blake; Kanye West; Quentin Miller	James Blake (Note: Blake asked for his production credit to be removed after the song's release, stating that the "spirit of [his] actual production is mostly absent".); Kanye West; Don Toliver (voc.); Quentin Miller (voc.)	Bully	2026	
"Three Rivers" (Dave)	David Omoregie; Kyle Evans; James Blake	James Blake; Kyle Evans; BKH Beats; Dave (add.)	We're All Alone in This Together	2021	
"Through the High Wire"	James Blake	James Blake; Jameela Jamil; Dominic Maker (add.); Josh Stadlen (add.)	Trying Times	2026	
"Thrown Around"	James Blake; Dominic Maker; Jameela Jamil	James Blake; Dominic Maker	Non-album single	2024	
"Til Further Notice" (Travis Scott)	Jacques Webster; James Blake; Shéyaa Bin Abraham-Joseph; Leland Wayne	James Blake; Metro Boomin	Utopia	2023	
"Timeless" (Note: The remix version of "Timeless" features Vince Staples, released in 2016.)	James Blake; Vince Staples	James Blake	The Colour in Anything	2016	
"To Care (Like You)"	James Blake	James Blake	James Blake	2011	
"To the Last"	James Blake	James Blake	Overgrown	2013	
"Too Much Talkin" (Erick the Architect)	Erick Arc Elliott; James Blake	James Blake	I've Never Been Here Before	2024	
"Toys 2" (Oneohtrix Point Never)	Daniel Lopatin	Oneohtrix Point Never; James Blake (add.); Astrolith (add.)	Age Of	2018	
"Transport Me" (James Blake and Lil Yachty)	James Blake; Miles Parks McCollum; Dominic Maker; Barrington Levy; Paul Love	James Blake; Dominic Maker; Lil Yachty (add.)	Bad Cameo	2024	
"Trying Times"	James Blake; Ben Assiter; P. Weston; Rob McAndrews	James Blake; Dominic Maker	Trying Times	2026	
"Twice" (James Blake and Lil Yachty)	James Blake; Miles Parks McCollum; Dominic Maker; Daniel Worrall Jacobs	James Blake; Dominic Maker; Lil Yachty (add.)	Bad Cameo	2024	
"Two Men Down"	James Blake	James Blake; Justin Vernon (add.)	The Colour in Anything	2016	
"Universal Soldier" (Jay Electronica)	Elpadaro Allah; Shawn Carter; Jacques Webster; James Blake; Jennifer Vashti Bunyan; Allen Toussaint; Bonnie Rae Flower; Wendy Ellen Flower-Freeman	Jay Electronica	A Written Testimony	2020	
"Unluck"	James Blake	James Blake	James Blake	2011	
"Violet Chemistry" (Miley Cyrus)	Miley Cyrus; Michael Williams II; Jesse Shatkin; James Blake; Sia Furler	Jesse Shatkin; Max Taylor-Sheppard; Maxx Morando; Mike Will Made It	Endless Summer Vacation	2023	
"Voyeur"	James Blake	James Blake	Overgrown	2013	
"Walk Out Music"	James Blake; Dominic Maker	James Blake; Dominic Maker; Jameela Jamil (add.)	Trying Times	2026	
"War Ready" (Vince Staples)	Vince Staples; James Blake; André Benjamin; Antwan Patton	James Blake	Prima Donna	2016	
"Warning" (Oneohtrix Point Never)	Daniel Lopatin	Oneohtrix Point Never; James Blake (add.)	Age Of	2018	
"Waves Know Shores"	James Blake	James Blake	The Colour in Anything	2016	
"We Go Home Together" (Mount Kimbie featuring James Blake)	Dominic Maker; Kai Campos; James Blake	Dominic Maker; Kai Campos	Love What Survives	2017	
"We Might Feel Unsound"	James Blake	James Blake	Enough Thunder	2011	
"We'll Take It" (Oneohtrix Point Never)	Daniel Lopatin	Oneohtrix Point Never; James Blake (add.)	Age Of	2018	
"When I'm Home"	James Blake; Christopher Nolan; Jacques Webster; Ludwig Göransson	James Blake; Ludwig Göransson; Noah Gorelick (add.)	The Odyssey (Original Motion Picture Soundtrack)	2026	
"when the party's over"	Finneas O'Connell	James Blake	Covers	2020	
"When We're Older"	James Blake; Beyoncé; Dave Rosser; Sydney Bennett; Nick Green; Abisagboola Oluseun	James Blake	Covers	2020	
"Where's the Catch?" (James Blake featuring André 3000)	James Blake; André Benjamin	James Blake; Dominic Maker (co.)	Assume Form	2019	
"Why Don't You Call Me"	James Blake	James Blake	James Blake	2011	
"Woo" (James Blake and Lil Yachty)	James Blake; Miles Parks McCollum; Dominic Maker	James Blake; Dominic Maker; Lil Yachty (add.)	Bad Cameo	2024	
"Words That We Both Know"	James Blake	James Blake	200 Press	2014	
"You're Too Precious"	James Blake; Dominic Maker	James Blake; Dominic Maker	Non-album single	2020	
"You Know Your Youth"	James Blake	James Blake	James Blake	2011	
