= Bad Cameo =

Studio album by James Blake and Lil Yachty
- Released: June 28, 2024
- Length: 43:42
- Labels: Quality Control; Motown; Republic
- Producers: James Blake; Dom Maker

James Blake chronology
CMYK 002 (2024)	Bad Cameo (2024)	Trying Times (2026)

Lil Yachty chronology
Something Ether (2024)	Bad Cameo (2024)

Bad Cameo is a collaborative studio album by English singer-songwriter and producer James Blake and American rapper Lil Yachty. It was released on June 28, 2024, by Quality Control Music, Motown, and Republic Records. The album is Blake's seventh and Yachty's sixth.

== Background and promotion ==
Blake and Yachty were first connected by their mutual friend Cam Hicks. Yachty had previously messaged Blake via Instagram in 2020 to praise his album Assume Form; Blake said he never saw the message, though he did say he'd "been a fan of Yachty for years. And when I heard his last record [Let's Start Here], I was like, this is really a turn. Not many artists are brave enough to do something that’s kind of opposite of the last thing they did."

A photo of Blake and Yachty together in a recording studio was posted in March 2023. In July, Blake hosted a series of DJ concerts called CMYK; Yachty appeared at one show, and Blake debuted a song with Yachty at another. The CMYK series was later expanded to CMYK Group, including the concerts, a production house, and a record label, with Bad Cameo being one of CMYK Group's first projects.

Yachty first teased the album on February 13, 2024, with a video he posted to Instagram where he said "I think James has worked with a quite substantial amount of hip hop artists. But this project is so left for both of us. Then, aside from the one picture that James posted, which he doesn't have many followers actually, I don't think people know that we know each other exist. So they're just going to be like 'What the f*ck? When did they do this?'"

== Writing and recording ==
When deciding on what kind of music the duo wanted to make, Yachty told Blake that he'd worked on enough hip hop music in his career and that Yachty wanted them to work on something completely different. Blake responded by showing Yachty some ambient music he'd been working on around the same time as his 2023 album Playing Robots into Heaven, and Yachty played his own music which matched the mood of Blake's.

== Release ==
Bad Cameo was announced on June 6 with its release date set for June 28 by Quality Control Music, Motown, and Republic Records. The duo also released the album's cover art, an overhead photo of a table showing Blake's hand next to a cup of tea and Yachty's next to a cup of lean.

== Style ==
In a joint interview with Complex, the album was described as ambient and a merger of "Yachty's ear for unexpected melodies with Blake's soulful tone and sharp production skills."

== Reception ==
Bad Cameo ratings
Aggregate scores
Source	Rating
Metacritic	75/100
Review scores
Source	Rating
AllMusic	4/5 stars
Clash	8/10
The Guardian	3/5 stars
The Line of Best Fit	8/10
Pitchfork	6.4/10

According to the review aggregator Metacritic, Bad Cameo received "generally favorable reviews" based on a weighted average score of 75 out of 100 from 6 critic scores.

Clash's Robin Murray wrote that Bad Cameo "doesn't quite have the 'what the fuck' aspects promised by Lil Yachty in a recent interview, but it does prove to have some extremely understated moments of impressive creativity." He also said that the album "proves that the Venn diagram between the English artist [James Blake] and his hip-hop counterpart [Lil Yachty] is an entirely natural, and deserved success." Joshua Mills of The Line of Best Fit praised the pair for providing "ideas in abundance, terrific variety, a little indulgence, and an end product that actually makes perfect sense". Chal Ravens was less positive in her review for The Guardian, writing that the album "sounds like it's got stuck in the planning stages, with handfuls of promising ideas stuffed awkwardly into ambient song shapes".

== Track listing ==
All tracks are written by James Blake and Miles Parks McCollum with others noted; all tracks are produced by Blake and additionally produced by Yachty with others noted.

Bad Cameo track listing
No.	Title	Writer(s)	Producers	Length
1.	"Save the Savior"	Dom Maker	Maker	4:05
2.	"In Grey"			6:10
3.	"Midnight"	Maker; Daniel Worrall Jacobs	Maker	4:59
4.	"Woo"	Maker	Maker	2:50
5.	"Bad Cameo"	Maker; Benjamin Saint Fort; Jeremiah Raisen	Maker; Bnyx (Note: Additional producer); Sadpony	3:52
6.	"Missing Man"	Maker	Maker	3:57
7.	"Twice"	Maker; Jacobs	Maker	4:57
8.	"Transport Me"	Maker; Barrington Levy; Paul Love	Maker	4:56
9.	"Run Away from the Rabbit"	Maker	Maker	3:47
10.	"Red Carpet"			4:09
Total length:				43:42

== Personnel ==
- James Blake – vocals, recording and mixing engineer
- Lil Yachty – vocals
- Joshua Smith – recording engineer
- Randy Merrill – mastering engineer
- Justine Skye – backing vocals (2)
- Monica Martin – backing vocals (3)

== Charts ==
Chart performance for Bad Cameo
Chart (2024)	Peak position
Belgian Albums (Ultratop Flanders)	198
