= 1-800 Dinosaur =

British record label

- Founded: 2013; 13 years ago
- Founder: James Blake, Dan Foat

1-800 Dinosaur is a British record label founded by James Blake. Their first release was in 2016.
