= 200 Press =

EP by James Blake
- Released: 8 December 2014
- Recorded: 2014
- Genres: Electronic, post-dubstep
- Length: 16:32
- Label: 1-800-Dinosaur
- Producer: James Blake

James Blake chronology
Overgrown (2013)	200 Press (2014)	The Colour in Anything (2016)

200 Press is the sixth solo EP by English singer-songwriter James Blake. Blake played all the instruments and produced the record. It was released on 1-800-Dinosaur on 8 December 2014. The name of the album (and the name of the title track) are a reference to the fact that only 200 copies of the vinyl edition would be pressed.

== Composition ==
200 Press contains further experimentation by Blake. He most notably used a sample of Andre 3000's verse from Devin the Dude's "What a Job".

The final track, "Words That We Both Know" is a poem set to disjointed piano.

== Reception ==
Professional ratings
Review scores
Source	Rating
Consequence of Sound	B
AbsolutePunk	8.5/10

The album received general acclaim from critics, mainly praising Blake's continued exploration and inventiveness. Consequence of Sound praised Blake for this, saying "... it’s refreshing to see Blake immerse himself in experimentation."

AbsolutePunk gave the album an 8.5/10, stating "The music contained on 200 Press is some of the most forward thinking stuff James Blake has done yet".

== Track listing ==
All tracks are written by James Blake.

No.	Title	Length
1.	"200 Press"	6:13
2.	"200 Pressure"	4:51
3.	"Building It Still"	4:25
4.	"Words That We Both Know"	1:03

== Personnel ==
- James Blake – writing, recording, production
