= Trying Times (album) =

Studio album by James Blake
- Released: 13 March 2026
- Recorded: 2022–2026
- Length: 47:39
- Label: Good Boy (Note: Digital marketing by Stellar Music Distribution and global strategy by Virgin Music Group)
- Producers: James Blake; Chris Trowbridge; Dominic Maker; Jameela Jamil; YouthXL

James Blake chronology
Bad Cameo (2024)	Trying Times (2026)

Singles from Trying Times
- 1. "Death of Love" Released: 22 January 2026; 2. "I Had a Dream She Took My Hand" Released: 12 February 2026

Trying Times is the seventh studio album by English singer-songwriter James Blake, released on 13 March 2026 through Good Boy Records. The album marks his first independent full-length release after leaving Polydor. It features guest appearances by Dave and Monica Martin and was executively produced by Jameela Jamil, Blake's romantic partner of several years. According to Metacritic, Trying Times received "generally favorable" reviews from music critics, while the Official Charts Company wrote that the album received "rave reviews".

Trying Times was promoted with the release of two singles, "Death of Love" on 22 January 2026 and "I Had a Dream She Took My Hand" on 12 February 2026, as well as one promotional single, "Doesn't Just Happen", released on Spotify on 12 March 2026. "Death of Love" peaked at number twenty-six on the New Zealand Hot Singles chart, while "Doesn't Just Happen" peaked at number nine. The latter also reached number sixty-six on the UK Singles Chart. The album debuted at number three on the UK Albums Chart, making it Blake's highest charting album debut in the country to date.

== Background ==
Work on Trying Times began "a few years" before its release; some songs were started during the pandemic. Blake started writing "Death of Love" in 2020 and performed it live a few times in 2022. He attributed his completion and release of multiple projects between 2020 and Trying Times's release to attention deficit hyperactivity disorder. In an interview published in October 2025, Blake stated that the album had been delayed by nine months from an unspecified planned release date.

Blake left his deal with Universal Music Group-owned Polydor in April 2024 after approximately twelve years. He subsequently teamed up with Indify, a platform that allows musicians to collaborate with investors and companies on a project-by-project basis. His first single as a newly-independent artist was "Thrown Around" (2024), released in collaboration with Good Boy Records and Stellar Music—companies he found through Indify. Shortly after becoming independent, Blake moved from Los Angeles back to his native London, at which point Trying Times went from a handful of old songs to Blake's next full project. It was reported in October 2025 that Good Boy renewed a distribution deal with Virgin Music Group. Trying Times, Blake's first full-length independent album, was released through Good Boy with digital marketing assisted by Stellar, and distribution and global strategy assisted by Virgin Music Group.

== Recording ==
Trying Times was created with what Blake described as a small, "chosen musical family" of collaborators, including Jameela Jamil, his romantic partner. He brought Jamil on as a full producer and executive producer because her observations and creative input had been inspiring him since his album The Colour in Anything (2016), which was a strong reference point for Trying Times. Blake claimed Trying Times is "like if The Colour in Anything was more concise". The track "Through the High Wire" was originally recorded alongside American rapper Kanye West for he and Blake's scrapped collaborative album War during 2022, though the final version features none of his contributions.

== Music ==
=== Sound ===
In an interview with Blake, journalist Jeff Ihaza remarked that Trying Times's songwriting seemed more inspired by "traditional instruments", as opposed to Blake's Playing Robots into Heaven (2023), which he claimed was a return to Blake's electronic roots. Blake responded that a long-running motif in his music was "disembodied and alien" vocals but that he felt it was no longer a rebellious or novel aesthetic: "[B]ecause of production techniques, there's actually such an alien disembodied quality to a lot of music [nowadays] anyway." He also stated that he had been attempting to improve at piano. In another interview, Blake referenced the "disembodied" aesthetic of prior album's vocals, elaborating: "The overall impression is almost like I'm in the background of my own painting." He contrasted this with Trying Times, in which he intended to be more of a "messenger" and directly connect with the audience through his singing. Trying Times features guitars on multiple tracks—a more prominent inclusion of the instrument than is typical for Blake's albums. Jeff Buckley, Morrissey, and Oasis were cited as influences.

=== Themes ===
Trying Times's title is intended doubly as a tongue-in-cheek understatement about the geopolitical state of the world and a reference to the sincere emotions of the songs. Blake explained that the album is less so about politics specifically and more about "reconciling your private life—your hopes, your dreams, your relationship, your love, your friendships—with what's happening outside and how much you allow it into your own world." In response to a quote from Blake about his mental stability and peace, journalist Vicky Jessop wrote: "The result is something that certainly feels different: confident, more grounded and, at times, more romantic. This is a Blake who is contemplating growing old with his partner [...] while also wrestling with his own demons and the wider world." On the album's structure and emotional journey, Blake said: "I think the record starts out quite questioning and potentially pessimistic. Then it becomes more hopeful. Then it becomes very beautiful, then it becomes quite ravy. Then it becomes quite peaceful. I think that trajectory is like there's a hero's journey to it. There's a feeling of completion when you reach the end. It's a beginning, middle, and end type situation, which I think helps it feel like it has an arc and wraps it in a bow by the end."

=== Songs ===
"Death of Love" was inspired by a "lack of empathy" in online discourse; in an interview, Blake explains: "I think people's desire to be seen was blocking their ability to see others. I think now we're starting to realise how much of it is bot-driven and algorithmically driven and how much of it is purposeful. [...] So 'Death of Love' covers that idea. I don't know if I arrived at any answers." According to Blake, "Didn't Come to Argue" is "about leaving society because you've had enough." Los Angeles Times's Julius Miller remarked that "Days Go By" was "about the inability to be present in life". Blake said that "Just a Little Higher" is "addressed to people who think the problem is some group that is somehow, in some way, the reason that they can't have what they want. [...] That song was written at a time when there were these kinds of white nationalist protests being organised. [...] Above all of it is who you should really be looking at, who are untouched by any of this. They're not in the streets, they're not in your local, they're not in your school or your place of work. They live in rarefied air. And they're pulling these strings."

== Promotion and release ==
Trying Times was teased on 19 January 2026 with the publication of the website tryingtimes.info; the lead single, "Death of Love", was released three days later with a live performance video featuring the London Welsh Men's Choir. The second single, "I Had a Dream She Took My Hand", was released on 12 February; it also came with a live performance video. "Doesn't Just Happen" was released as a promotional single on Spotify on 12 March.

=== Tour ===
Trying Times was promoted with a tour of the same name, consisting of nineteen concerts. The first leg, in North America, took place from 27 May 2026 to 12 June. The second leg, in Europe, is scheduled to take place from 29 September to 28 October.

== Artwork ==
The album's cover art features Blake surrounded by spinning plates.

== Critical reception ==
Professional ratings
Aggregate scores
Source	Rating
AnyDecentMusic?	7.7/10
Metacritic	77/100
Review scores
Source	Rating
AllMusic	4/5 stars
Clash	8/10
DIY	4.5/5 stars
Dork	5/5 stars
The Guardian	4/5 stars
The Independent	4/5 stars
Paste	C+
Pitchfork	7.2/10
Slant Magazine	4/5 stars
Under the Radar	8/10

According to the review aggregator Metacritic, Trying Times received "generally favorable reviews" based on a weighted average score of 77 out of 100 from twelve critic scores. The review aggregator Any Decent Music gave the album a weighted average score of 7.7 from thirteen critic scores. The Official Charts Company characterised the critical reception as "rave reviews" for its "bold blend of personal and social commentary."

Many critics praised Blake's "melancholic" and "introspective" songwriting, and the album's experimentalism with R&B and "electronic minimalism". In an 8/10 review of Clash, Irene Monokandilos of Clash described the album as "a soft landing in the middle from someone who has learned vulnerability doesn't get easier with age", calling it "fragile, imperfect, but necessary". In a similar vein, Ben Tipple of DIY praised Blake's ability to "[paint]... his seventh studio album, as a compendium of his best parts", awarding the album with a score of 4.5/5.

Rachel Aroesti of The Guardian highlighted the album's wide range of styles and its inventive production, noting that "the hooks are strikingly fresh yet distantly familiar", though she found some of Blake's "sociopolitical" lyrics to be "preachy" or "banal". In spite of this perceived flaw, she deemed it to be "a consistently excellent album". Aroesti gave the album a rating of 4/5. In agreement with the score, Ed Power of The Irish Times described the album as "a comedown album with no bottom floor – only endless depths", praising Blake's stylistic use of "stillness, beauty and quietly roiling rage". Power concluded that Blake "sounds revved up – but, more than that, he seems at peace". Speaking for Pitchfork, Andrew Rice observed that Blake "sounds free, unencumbered by expectations", praising the album's "suavity and melodic sense borrowed from traditional R&B".

== Commercial performance ==
Trying Times contained three charted songs. "Death of Love", the album's lead single, peaked at number 26 on the NZ Hot Singles chart. Upon the release of the album, the tracks "Trying Times" and "Doesn't Just Happen" both entered the same chart at numbers 17 and 6, respectively, while the latter also entered the UK Singles chart at number 66.

The album itself debuted in the top-10 position of several major countries' charts, both in the United Kingdom and internationally. On the Official Charts Company's UK Albums Chart, the album debuted at number 3, becoming Blake's fifth top-10 entry onto the chart and his highest debut overall. Supportively, it appeared leading the UK Record Store Chart and UK Vinyl Albums Chart. The majority of Blake's sales numbers came from independent record store retailers; from these outlets alone, the album sold 9,000 first-week copies in the United Kingdom, comprising nine-tenths of the album's sales.

The album also received recognition internationally, entering several major countries' charts, including the ARIA's Australian Albums chart, Ultratop Flanders' Belgian Albums chart, the Dutch Albums chart, Recorded Music NZ's New Zealand Albums chart, and OCC's Scottish Albums chart, peaking at numbers 35, 3, 16, 36, and 1, respectively. In the United States, the album debuted at its peak positions of numbers 27 and 49 on Billboard's Top Album Sales and Top Independent Albums charts, respectively.

== Track listing ==
No.	Title	Writer(s)	Producer(s)	Length
1.	"Walk Out Music"	James Blake Litherland; Dominic Maker	Litherland; Maker; Jameela Jamil^{[A]}	3:20
2.	"Death of Love"	Litherland; Leonard Cohen^{[a]}; Patrick Leonard^{[a]}	Litherland; Jamil; Maker^{[A]}	3:26
3.	"I Had a Dream She Took My Hand"	Litherland; Maker; Joseph Quiñones^{[b]}	Litherland; Maker; Chris Trowbridge; Jamil^{[A]}; Josh Stadlen^{[A]}	3:40
4.	"Trying Times"	Litherland; Ben Assiter; P. Weston; Rob McAndrews	Litherland; Maker	4:33
5.	"Make Something Up"	Litherland; Weston	Litherland; Maker; Khushi^{[A]}	4:06
6.	"Didn't Come to Argue" (with Monica Martin)	Litherland; Maker; James Dent Dotson; Monica Martin	Litherland; Jamil; Maker; Khushi^{[A]}	4:42
7.	"Days Go By"	Litherland; Dylan Mills^{[c]}	Litherland; Jamil; Maker; Khushi^{[A]}; Stadlen^{[A]}; Bob MacKenzie^{[A]}	4:02
8.	"Doesn't Just Happen" (with Dave)	Litherland; Maker; David Omoregie; Roméo "YouthXL" Testa	Litherland; Jamil; Maker; YouthXL; MacKenzie^{[A]}	3:17
9.	"Obsession"	Litherland	Litherland; Jamil^{[A]}; Maker^{[A]}	1:40
10.	"Rest of Your Life"	Litherland; Alan Bergman; Marilyn Bergman; Michel Legrand	Litherland; Jamil; Maker	4:42
11.	"Through the High Wire"	Litherland	Litherland; Jamil; Maker^{[A]}; Stadlen^{[A]}	3:42
12.	"Feel It Again"	Litherland	Litherland; Jamil^{[A]}; Maker^{[A]}	2:10
13.	"Just a Little Higher"	Litherland	Litherland; Jamil; Maker	4:19
Total length:				47:39

Notes

- ^{^[A]}Additional producer

Sample credits

- ^{^[a]}"Death of Love" samples "You Want It Darker", written by Cohen and Leonard
- ^{^[b]}"I Had a Dream She Took My Hand" samples "It Was Only a Dream", written by Quiñones
- ^{^[c]}"Days Go By" samples "I Luv U", written by Mills

== Personnel ==
These credits have been adapted from music streaming services Apple Music, Spotify, and Tidal. Additionally, Blake has stated in an interview that "Rest of Your Life" uses a piano filtered through a Torso T1 sequencer, operated by him.

- Jameela Jamil – executive production (all tracks)
- James Blake – vocals (all tracks); piano (4); programming (4–5); synthesiser, guitar (5); recording (2, 5–6, 9–11)
- Cantor Gideon Zelermyer – background vocals (2)
- Congregation Shaar Hashomayim Synagogue Choir – background vocals (2)
- Josh Stadlen – drums (3)
- Rob McAndrews – guitar (3–4)
- Ben Assiter – drums (4)
- Bob MacKenzie – organ, recording assistance (4); recording (1–3, 5–13)
- Dom Maker – production (all tracks)
- Kalim Patel – guitar (5)
- Monica Martin – vocals (6)
- Dave – vocals (8)
- Bolt Strings – strings (13)
  - Andy Crick – cello
  - Ciara Ismail – violin
  - Stephanie Benedetti – violin
  - Evangeline Tang – double bass
  - Nicola Hicks – viola
- Josh Smith – recording (1, 3–5, 8, 13)
- Johnny Leslie – recording (8)
- Jon Castelli – mixing (all tracks)
- Ruairí O'Flaherty – mastering (all tracks)

== Charts ==
Chart performance for Trying Times
Chart (2026)	Peak position
Australian Albums (ARIA)	35
Austrian Albums (Ö3 Austria)	29
Belgian Albums (Ultratop Flanders)	3
Belgian Albums (Ultratop Wallonia)	30
Dutch Albums (Album Top 100)	16
German Albums (Offizielle Top 100)	7
Japanese Dance & Soul Albums (Oricon)	5
Japanese Western Albums (Oricon)	23
New Zealand Albums (RMNZ)	36
Scottish Albums (Official Charts)	1
Swiss Albums (Schweizer Hitparade)	18
UK Albums (Official Charts)	3
UK Independent Albums (Official Charts)	1
US Independent Albums (Billboard)	49
US Top Album Sales (Billboard)	27
