= Overgrown =

Studio album by James Blake
- Released: 5 April 2013
- Recorded: 2010–2012
- Genres: R&B; electronic; soul
- Length: 39:22
- Labels: Atlas; Republic; Polydor
- Producer: James Blake

James Blake chronology
Love What Happened Here (2011)	Overgrown (2013)	200 Press (EP) (2014)

Singles from Overgrown
- 1. "Retrograde" Released: 11 February 2013; 2. "Overgrown" Released: 10 April 2013

Overgrown is the second studio album by English singer-songwriter James Blake. It was released on 5 April 2013 by Blake's Atlas Records, along with Republic Records and Polydor Records. The album features guest appearances from Wu-Tang Clan member RZA and English musician Brian Eno. Overgrown debuted at number eight on the UK Albums Chart and at number one on the US Dance/Electronic chart. It was supported by lead single "Retrograde".

The album was awarded the 2013 Mercury Prize, beating favourites Laura Mvula, Disclosure and David Bowie to win. It also earned Blake a nomination for the Grammy Award for Best New Artist at the 56th Annual Grammy Awards.

== Background ==
Following both the critical and commercial success of Blake's self-titled debut album, Blake released both the Enough Thunder and Love What Happened Here EPs. These EPs, noticeably more structured than his previous releases, featured more R&B tinged work as opposed to the dubstep-influenced electronic sound of CMYK. Many reviewers speculated in the year between releases that Blake was headed in the wrong direction, with Pitchfork's Larry Fitzmaurice saying that "James Blake's reliance on piano-based singer/songwriter electro-soul perhaps played it a bit too safe, prompting comparisons to the once-outré, now-gear spinning career of fellow avant-crooner Jamie Lidell".

Blake admitted to Hot Press in an interview about Overgrown that his relationship affected the album. He said, "I can't deny it. There's no point in trying to come up with some other explanation for what I've been writing about....When it happened, I was really struck. Y'know—suddenly I'm hit!".

Earlier in 2012, Blake spent time with American rapper Kanye West and singer Justin Vernon. In 2012, after months of speculation, Blake announced a new collaborative non-single release under the moniker Harmonimix. This release featured British rapper Trim and the single "Confidence Boost/Saying" was released on 24 September 2012. It was a return to form for Blake and featured the distinct characteristics present in his previous efforts (though "Confidence Boost" had been floating around on the internet for three or four years).

== Promotion and release ==
During the final weeks of 2012, Blake performed three intimate shows where he debuted five new tracks, "Our Love Comes Back", "Overgrown", "Retrograde", "To the Last" and "Every Day I Ran."

Blake announced via Facebook on 7 February 2013 that his second album, Overgrown, would be released on 8 April. The first single from the album, "Retrograde", was debuted the same day on BBC Radio 1, and was released on 11 February. On 7 March, Blake and his labelmates at 1-800 Dinosaur shared both the dub version of "Voyeur" and the album cut of "Digital Lion" featuring Brian Eno. The title track was released as a single on 10 April alongside a music video directed by Nabil Elderkin. A remix of the track "Life Round Here" featuring Chance the Rapper was released on 11 October alongside a music video directed by Nabil Elderkin.

== Critical reception ==
Professional ratings
Aggregate scores
Source	Rating
AnyDecentMusic?	7.9/10
Metacritic	82/100
Review scores
Source	Rating
AllMusic	5/5 stars
The A.V. Club	A−
The Daily Telegraph	4/5 stars
The Guardian	5/5 stars
The Independent	4/5 stars
NME	8/10
Paste	6.4/10
Pitchfork	8.0/10
Q	3/5 stars
Rolling Stone	3.5/5 stars

Overgrown received widespread critical acclaim upon its release. At Metacritic, which assigns a rating out of 100 to reviews from mainstream critics, the album received an average score of 82, based on 40 reviews, which indicates "universal acclaim". Martyn Young of musicOMH stated that "Overgrown is more diverse and dynamic than before. Blake seems to have found an ideal middle ground between restrained and measured balladry and disorientating electronic soul". This sentiment was echoed by The Guardian's Paul MacInnes, who wrote that "Blake's palette is unique, his abilities as a composer are great and quite obviously growing." In a review for AllMusic, Fred Thomas described the album as existing "somewhere between the vacant echoes of dub and trip-hop, dubstep's sample-slicing production, and the contained heartbreak of a singer/songwriter playing piano to himself in an empty room," and noted that "while it might take listeners a few spins to find the right head space for the album, once they get there, it's an easy place to get lost in." Clash said the album is "paradoxically less fragmented than its illustrious predecessor, ideas rotating core values guided by an affirmatively unseen hand. Which ultimately makes this an even better record."

On 30 October 2013, the album won the Mercury Music Prize for album of the year. The lead single, "Retrograde", also won an Ivor Novello Award for Best Contemporary Song.

Overgrown ranked among the top albums for the year, making it on to many end-of-year lists.

=== Year-end rankings ===
Publication	List	Rank	Ref
Clash	Clash's Top Albums of 2013	2	
Complex	The Best Albums of 2013	3	
Consequence of Sound	The Top 50 Albums of 2013	37	
The Guardian	The Best Albums of 2013	5	
The Michigan Daily	Best of 2013: Top 10 Albums	6	
Mojo	Top 50 Albums of 2013	25	
NME	NME's 50 Best Albums of 2013	50	
NPR	NPR Music's 50 Favorite Albums of 2013	N/A	
Pitchfork	Top 50 Best Albums of 2013	26	
Pitchfork	2013 Readers' Poll	14	
Pretty Much Amazing	40 Best Albums of 2013	32^{☨}	
Q	50 Best Albums of 2013	46	
Richard Kingsmill	Top 10 Albums of 2013	1	
Tiny Mix Tapes	Favorite 50 Albums of 2013	25	

"N/A" indicates that the publication did not rank the works included in their year-end list.

"☨" denotes that the Top 10 were unranked and published alphabetically.

=== Decade-end rankings ===
Publication	List	Rank	Ref
AllMusic	The AllMusic Decade in Review (2010s)	N/A	
The A.V. Club	The AV Club's 50 Favorite Albums of the 2010s	22	

The Decade in Review list incorporates an unranked enumeration of 200 albums spanning the 2010s decade.

== Track listing ==
All tracks are written by James Blake, except "Digital Lion", written by Blake, Brian Eno and Rob McAndrews.

No.	Title	Length
1.	"Overgrown"	5:00
2.	"I Am Sold"	4:04
3.	"Life Round Here"	3:37
4.	"Take a Fall for Me" (featuring RZA)	3:33
5.	"Retrograde"	3:43
6.	"DLM"	2:25
7.	"Digital Lion"	4:45
8.	"Voyeur"	4:17
9.	"To the Last"	4:19
10.	"Our Love Comes Back"	3:39
Total length:		39:22

iTunes bonus tracks
No.	Title	Length
11.	"Every Day I Ran"	3:24
12.	"Retrograde" (music video)	4:03
Total length:		48:09

Japanese edition bonus track
No.	Title	Length
11.	"The Wilhelm Scream" (Live at Pitchfork)	6:01
Total length:		45:23

== Personnel ==
- James Blake – writing, engineering, production, mixing, instrumentation, vocals
- Brian Eno – writing (track 7)
- Rob McAndrews – writing, guitar (track 7)
- Ben Assiter – additional percussion (track 1)
- RZA – vocals (track 4)
- Matt Colton – mastering

== Charts ==
=== Weekly charts ===
Chart (2013)	Peak position
Australian Albums (ARIA)	5
Australian Dance Albums (ARIA)	1
Austrian Albums (Ö3 Austria)	21
Belgian Albums (Ultratop Flanders)	12
Belgian Albums (Ultratop Wallonia)	57
Croatian Albums (HDU)	25
Danish Albums (Hitlisten)	2
Dutch Albums (Album Top 100)	32
French Albums (SNEP)	62
German Albums (Offizielle Top 100)	13
Greek Albums (IFPI)	57
Irish Albums (IRMA)	24
Italian Albums (FIMI)	98
Japanese Albums (Oricon)	12
New Zealand Albums (RMNZ)	27
Norwegian Albums (VG-lista)	10
Portuguese Albums (AFP)	9
Scottish Albums (Official Charts)	19
South Korean Albums (Gaon)	52
Spanish Albums (Promusicae)	63
Swiss Albums (Schweizer Hitparade)	16
UK Albums (Official Charts)	8
US Billboard 200	32
US Top Dance Albums (Billboard)	1

=== Year-end charts ===
Chart (2013)	Position
Australian Dance Albums (ARIA)	19
Belgian Albums (Ultratop Flanders)	117
Danish Albums (Hitlisten)	76
UK Albums (OCC)	186
US Top Dance/Electronic Albums (Billboard)	23

== Certifications and sales ==
Region	Certification	Certified units/sales
Denmark (IFPI Danmark)	Gold	10,000^{‡}
United Kingdom (BPI)	Silver	60,000^{*}
United States	—	54,000
^{*} Sales figures based on certification alone.^{‡} Sales+streaming figures based on certification alone.

== Release history ==
Region	Date	Label
Australia	5 April 2013	Universal
Germany	5 April 2013	Universal
Ireland	5 April 2013	Atlas; A&M; Polydor
United Kingdom	8 April 2013	Atlas; A&M; Polydor
France	8 April 2013	Universal
Sweden	8 April 2013	Universal
Italy	9 April 2013	Universal
Poland	9 April 2013	Universal
United States	9 April 2013	Republic
Japan	10 April 2013	Universal

== See also ==
- List of number-one electronic albums of 2013 (U.S.)
