= Love What Happened Here =

EP by James Blake
- Released: 12 December 2011
- Recorded: 2011
- Genre: Electronic
- Label: R&S Records
- Producer: James Blake

James Blake chronology
Enough Thunder (2011)	Love What Happened Here (2011)	Overgrown (2013)

Professional ratings
Aggregate scores
Source	Rating
Metacritic	77/100
Review scores
Source	Rating
Pitchfork Media	7.9/10
Consequence of Sound	B

Love What Happened Here is the fifth solo EP by English singer-songwriter James Blake. It was first released on 12 December 2011 as digital download and then on 2 March 2012 on 12" vinyl record. It was produced by James Blake and mastered by Matt Colton.

== Track listing ==
All tracks are written by James Blake.

No.	Title	Length
1.	"Love What Happened Here"	5:34
2.	"At Birth"	4:34
3.	"Curbside"	4:18

== Personnel ==
- James Blake – writing, production
- Matt Colton – mastering

== Chart performance ==
Chart (2012)	Peak position
UK Physical Singles Chart (Official Charts Company)	34
