= A Case of You (song) =

Song by Joni Mitchell

from the album Blue
- Released: June 22, 1971
- Recorded: 1971
- Genre: Folk, folk rock
- Length: 4:20
- Label: Reprise
- Songwriter: Joni Mitchell
- Producer: Joni Mitchell

Official audio
- "A Case of You" (2021 remaster) on YouTube

"A Case of You" is a song by Canadian singer-songwriter Joni Mitchell, from her fourth studio album Blue (1971). The song has been covered by numerous artists and has been listed by listeners of BBC Radio 4's Desert Island Discs as the No. 1 female song. In 2021, it was listed at No. 26 on Rolling Stone's "Top 500 Best Songs of All Time". In June 2026, CBS News included the song in its list of the 250 essential American songs of the past 250 years.

== Writing and recording ==
Mitchell wrote "A Case of You" in or before 1970. She performed the song at the Amchitka Greenpeace benefit concert in October 1970. She recorded the song in 1971, and it was released on the 1971 album Blue with Mitchell playing Appalachian dulcimer, accompanied by James Taylor on acoustic guitar, which was tuned to standard tuning, (EADGBE), although there are cover versions played in an open G tuning (DGDGBD).

Mitchell's earliest public performances of "A Case of You" contain six lines that had changed by the time Blue was recorded. The line "I am as constant as a northern star" is an allusion to Caesar's "I am constant as the Northern Star" from the Shakespeare play Julius Caesar, while the quoted line "Love is touching souls" is inspired by the Austrian poet Rainer Maria Rilke.

"A Case of You" was also released as the B-side of "California".

== Personnel ==
According to the liner notes:

- Joni Mitchell – Appalachian dulcimer, guitar, vocals, production
- James Taylor – guitar
- Russ Kunkel – drums

== Additional recordings and performances ==
Mitchell later re-recorded the song for her live album Miles of Aisles (1974), as well as her orchestral album Both Sides Now (2000). She performed it regularly on her 1983 tour. The original recording was included on Mitchell's compilation Misses (1996). A demo recording was included on the 50th anniversary EP of Blue in 2021.

== Certifications ==
Region	Certification	Certified units/sales
United Kingdom (BPI)	Silver	200,000^{‡}
^{‡} Sales+streaming figures based on certification alone.

== Cover versions ==
There are well over 500 known recordings of "A Case of You". The cabaret singer Connie Champagne recorded "A Case of You" in the persona of Judy Garland on her 2003 album Imagine Judy Garland: An Evening with Connie Champagne. In 2012 the Portuguese singer Ana Moura recorded a cover version for her album Desfado produced by Mitchell's former husband and producer Larry Klein. James Blake recorded a version for Zane Lowe's programme on BBC Radio 1, which later appeared on the Enough Thunder EP and the deluxe edition of his self-titled album. Schitt's Creek star Noah Reid performed his version in honor of his co-star Catherine O'Hara for the Governor General's Awards in 2021.

== Soundtrack appearances ==
The song appears in the films Truly, Madly, Deeply, Practical Magic, Clickbait (miniseries) (cover) and Waking the Dead. Mitchell declined, however, to grant permission to use the song in the 2013 film A Case of You.

Truly, Madly, Deeply, writer-director Anthony Minghella's first film, marked the first appearance of "A Case of You" in a narrative film; the stars, Juliet Stevenson and Alan Rickman, sing the first verse and chorus of the song to each other, leading directly to the titular dialogue, "I truly, madly, deeply love you".

In 2013 the song was featured in "In Dreams Begin Responsibilities", the fourth episode of the fifth season of NBC's Parenthood. One of the main characters, Drew, is pursuing a girl who mentions she loves the song. Drew tries to learn as much about Joni Mitchell as he can, only to find out that the girl only knows "A Case Of You" because it was in a movie.
