= James Blake (musician) =

English singer-songwriter (born 1988)

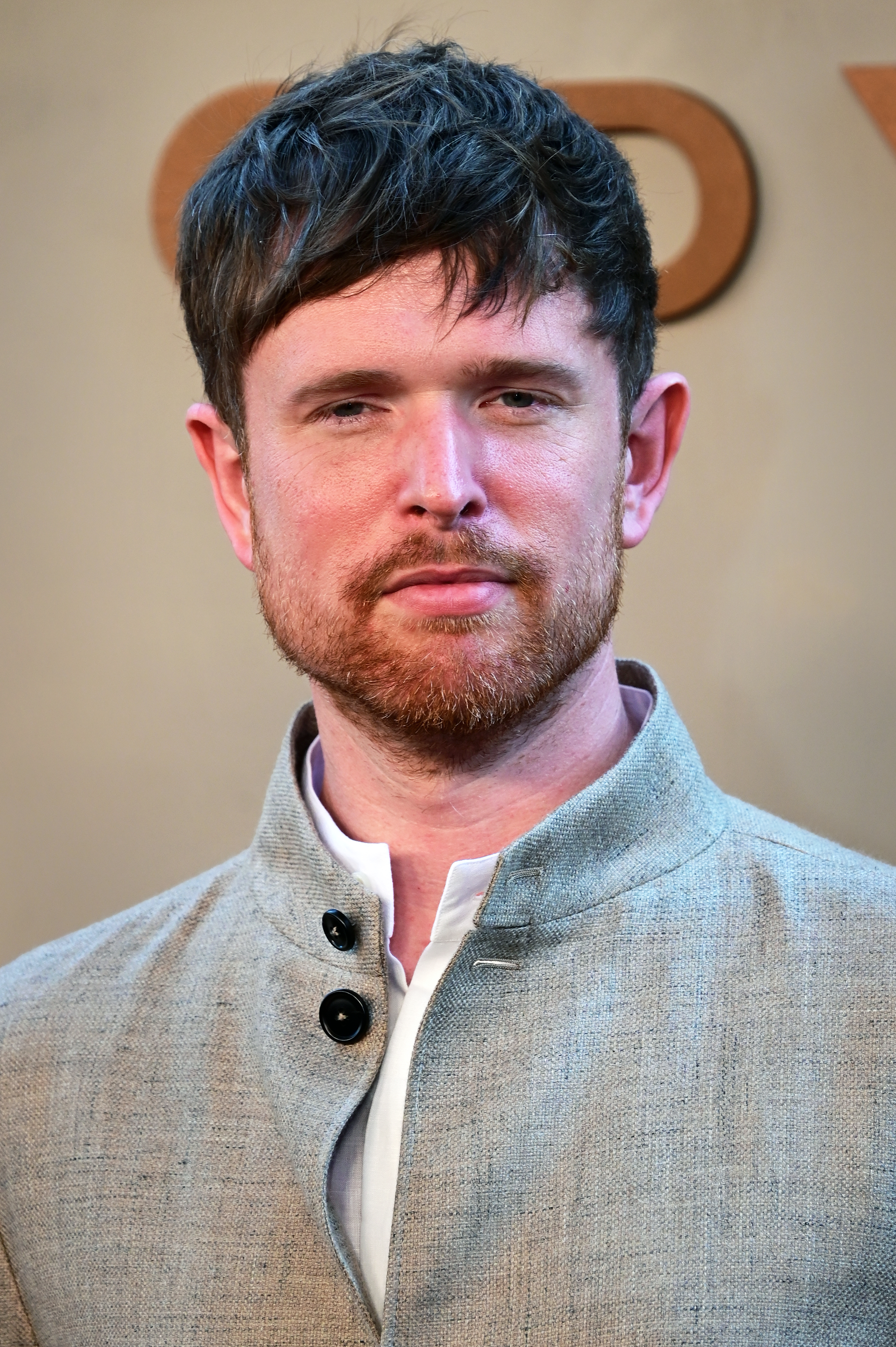
- Blake in 2026

Background information
- Also known as: Harmonimix
- Born: James Blake Litherland; 26 September 1988 (age 38); Enfield, London, England
- Genres: UK bass; soul; electronic; ambient; post-dubstep
- Occupations: Singer-songwriter; record producer
- Instruments: Vocals; keyboards
- Works: Discography (songs)
- Years active: 2009–present
- Labels: 1-800 Dinosaur; R&S; A&M; Polydor; Universal Republic; Hessle
- Partner: Jameela Jamil (2015–present)
- Father: James Litherland
- Website: jamesblakemusic.com

James Blake Litherland (born 26 September 1988) is an English singer-songwriter and record producer. Known for his emotive, soulful light head voice and use of falsetto, he first gained recognition following the release of three extended plays in 2010: The Bells Sketch, CMYK and Klavierwerke. Blake subsequently signed with A&M Records to release his self-titled debut album (2011) the following year, which was met with critical praise and peaked within the top ten of the UK Albums Chart. Blake departed A&M in favour of sister label Republic Records, on which he released his second album, Overgrown (2013), to further critical and commercial success; it likewise peaked within the chart's top ten and moderately entered the US Billboard 200.

His third album, The Colour in Anything (2016), was followed by his 2018 single "King's Dead" (with Jay Rock, Kendrick Lamar and Future), which peaked at number 50 on the UK Singles Chart and number 21 on the Billboard Hot 100. Its success foresaw the release of his fourth album, Assume Form (2019), which remains his highest-charting entry on both the UK Albums Chart and Billboard 200. His fifth, sixth, and seventh studio albums, Friends That Break Your Heart (2021), Playing Robots Into Heaven (2023), Trying Times (2026), followed thereafter. In 2024, Blake released the collaborative album Bad Cameo with American rapper Lil Yachty.

Blake has written and produced work for other artists, often doing so jointly with his partner Jameela Jamil. His credits include Jay-Z, Kanye West, Beyoncé, Kendrick Lamar, and Frank Ocean. He has won a Mercury Prize from two nominations, two Grammy Awards from nine nominations, a Latin Grammy Award, and three Brit Award nominations.

== Early life and education ==
James Blake Litherland was born on 26 September 1988 in Enfield, London, England. He is the only child of musician James Litherland and Helen Litherland, and showed an interest and aptitude in music from a young age.

He received classical training in piano as a child, and completed primary education at Grange Park Primary School, Winchmore Hill, and secondary education at The Latymer School, Edmonton.

He went on to Goldsmiths, University of London, where he received a degree in popular music.

== Career ==
=== 2009–2010: Early releases ===
Blake began his music career by releasing his debut 12" record, Air & Lack Thereof in the United Kingdom during July 2009, while being persistent in recording songs in his bedroom. Having been released on the record label Hemlock, the extended play became a favourite of BBC Radio 1 DJ Gilles Peterson. Soon after the release of the record, Blake was invited by Peterson to do a special mix on his international show, including an exclusive Mount Kimbie track. As a second-year composition assignment for his studies at Goldsmiths, he submitted the Klavierwerke EP which was awarded high marks.

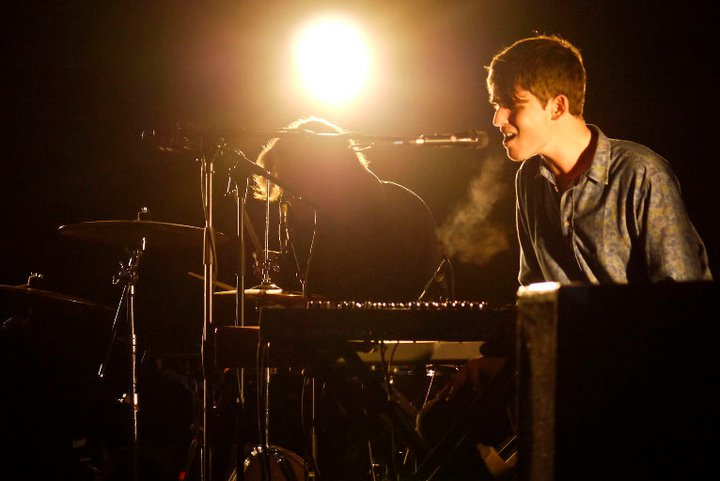
Blake performing at Glastonbury Festival June 2011

A third EP, entitled CMYK, was released through R&S Records during 2010. The title track, "CMYK" was selected by BBC Radio 1 DJ Nick Grimshaw as his Record of the Week and also received airplay from other DJs. On 29 September 2010, Zane Lowe selected Blake's cover version of "Limit to Your Love" as his "Hottest Record in the World". The song was written and originally recorded by Feist and appeared on her studio album, The Reminder. The single was released in the United Kingdom on 28 November 2010, where it debuted on the UK Singles Chart at number 47.

=== 2011: Self-titled album ===
Blake was nominated for the BBC's Sound of 2011, an annual poll that highlights the forthcoming year's likely successful musicians. He placed second ahead of fellow shortlisted acts The Vaccines, Jamie Woon and Clare Maguire. On 15 December 2010, Blake was runner-up behind singer-songwriter Jessie J at the Brit Awards' "Critic's Choice". In January 2011, Blake was awarded Single of the Year (2010) for "CMYK" at Gilles Peterson's Worldwide Awards. Blake's work found itself on numerous 2010 year-end best-of lists, with "CMYK" ranking 24th on Frontier Psychiatrist's top 40 songs of the year, the Bells Sketch/CMYK/Klavierwerke EPs ranking 8th on Pitchfork Media's top 50 albums of 2010, and "I Only Know (What I Know Now)" ranking 8th on Pitchfork's top 100 tracks of 2010.

Blake revealed in late December 2010 that his album would be self-titled, and the 11-track James Blake was released on 7 February 2011. Only days after the original announcement was made, the album was leaked onto the internet. On 9 January 2011, "The Wilhelm Scream" was trailed as the album's second single ("Limit To Your Love" was also included on the album). In February 2011, Blake first appeared on the cover of the publication The Fader, in its 72nd issue. Blake debuted a collaboration with Bon Iver called "Fall Creek Boys Choir" in August 2011 and during the next month, the BBC released an exclusive mix by Blake, which included 10 of his unreleased songs. These included "Deeds", "Olivia Kept", and "Evening Fell Hard for Us". During the final weeks of 2012, Blake performed three "intimate" shows where he debuted new songs.

Later that year, Blake released both the Enough Thunder and Love What Happened Here EPs in 2011. These EPs, noticeably more structured than his previous releases, featured R&B-tinged work as opposed to the experimental electronic style found on CMYK.

=== 2012–2013: Overgrown ===
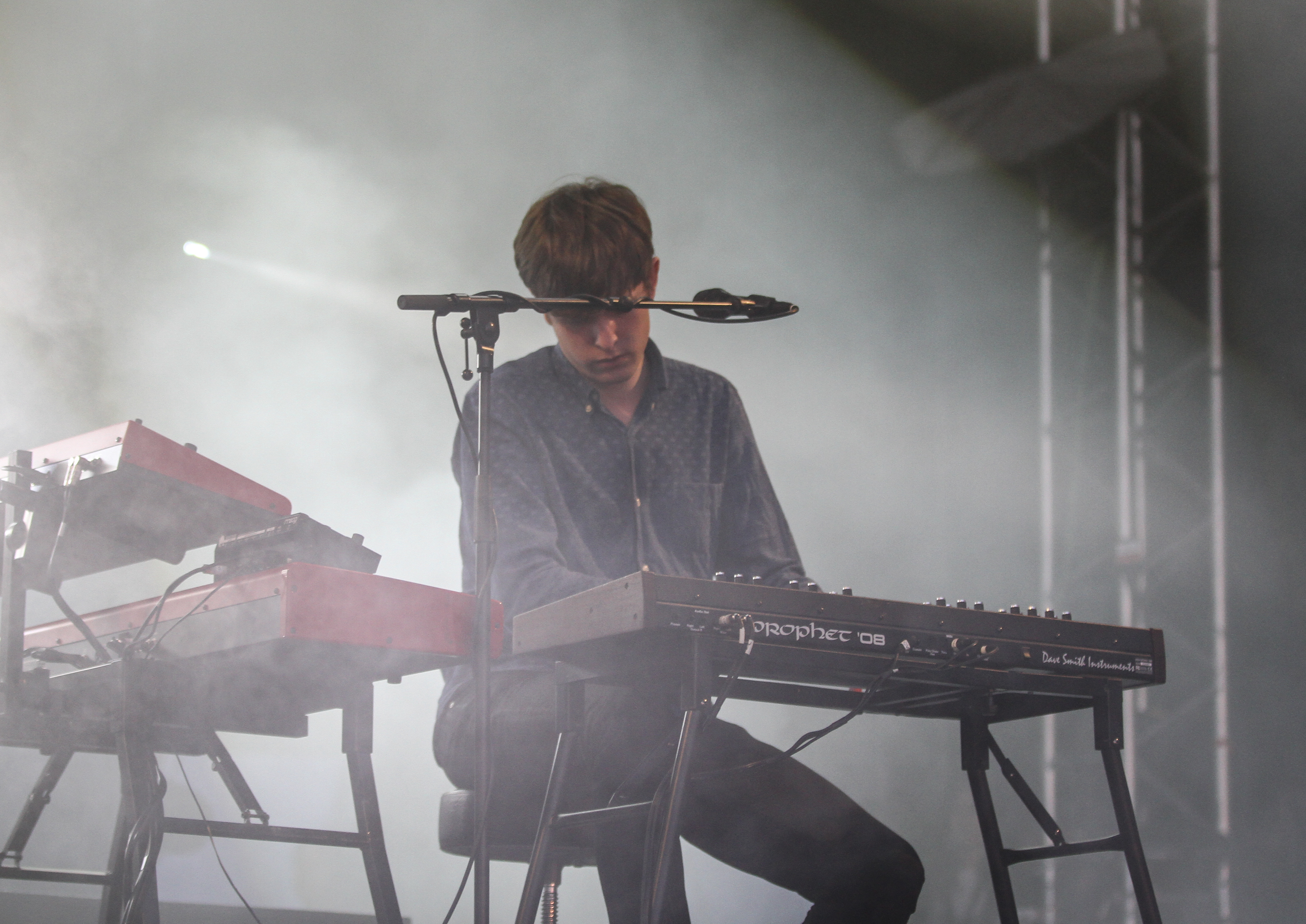
Blake performing in 2013

Early in 2012, Blake spent time with American rapper Kanye West (who named Blake as his favourite artist) and singer Justin Vernon. Later that year, Blake announced a new collaborative non-single release under the moniker Harmonimix with British rapper Trim; the single "Confidence Boost/Saying" was released on 24 September 2012. Also in 2012, Blake and friends (including Foat, Nick Sigsworth, and touring musicians Rob McAndrews and Ben Assiter) secured a residency at the club Plastic People as the collective 1-800 Dinosaur, hosting a series of impromptu dance nights. In summer 2013, the collective launched a label of the same name, on which Blake and other artists released material.

His second album, Overgrown, was released on 5 April 2013. Blake departed A&M in favour of sister label Republic Records, on which Overgrown was released , to further critical and commercial success; it likewise peaked within the chart's top ten and moderately entered the US Billboard 200.

The first single from the album, "Retrograde", was debuted the same day on BBC Radio 1, and was released on 11 February. On 25 February, the track listing and album art were revealed. It was selected as Variance Magazine's Album of the Year as of December 2013. The album features guest appearances from noted electronic music producer Brian Eno and rapper RZA of Wu-Tang Clan. The release received critical acclaim and was awarded the 2013 Mercury Prize. Blake revealed to Hot Press that falling in love had influenced the warm nu-soul sound on the album, as opposed to the experimentalism found on his self-titled effort. A remix featuring Chance the Rapper, of a track from Overgrown, "Life Round Here", was released on 11 October alongside a music video directed by Nabil Elderkin.

=== 2014–2017: The Colour in Anything ===
In an interview with Spotify, Blake revealed that a day prior to the release of Drake's single "0 to 100 / The Catch Up", he received an email asking whether a beat from one of his older tracks could be used on the single; he refused and asked Drake's label to remove the sample. Blake's publisher later approached him and asked him about his decision. Blake in return asked how much money he had lost by turning down the offer and reportedly spat out his drink when he found out.

In December 2014, during his BBC Radio 1 Residency, Blake announced that his third studio album would be titled Radio Silence and would be released in the first half of 2015. He later confirmed that the album would feature Bon Iver and Kanye West, as well as feature guitar work from Connan Mockasin. Blake received a Grammy Award nomination in 2014 for Best New Artist.

On 11 February 2016, Blake premiered a new song entitled "Modern Soul" during his BBC Radio 1 residency. On 14 April 2016, Blake revealed during a surprise hosting spot on BBC Radio 1 that he'd finished the album, and that it was 18 tracks in length. He stated that it includes one track that stretches to 20 minutes in length. Later in the broadcast he premiered a new song titled 'Timeless', though did not say whether it would be included on the album. In a May 2016 interview with BBC Radio 1, Blake stated that he began work on the album in England, and after "running out of steam" went to the United States to complete the recording at Shangri La Studios with producer Rick Rubin.

Blake produced and was featured on the song "Forward" from Beyoncé's 2016 album Lemonade. He also co-wrote the album's opening track, "Pray You Catch Me". On 28 April, social media posts by Blake and his label, 1-800 Dinosaur, reposted photos of a mural by children's novel illustrator Sir Quentin Blake (best known for his work with writer Roald Dahl) that hinted at the new album title The Colour in Anything; this was confirmed as the title of his new album several days later. The album was released on 6 May 2016.

Blake collaborated with Jay-Z on his album 4:44, handling the production on two of the three bonus tracks off the album and was also featured on the bonus track "ManyFacedGod". He also handled production on Kendrick Lamar's song "Element" as the original version of the track sounded "a little too jazzy". On 2 September 2016, Blake released a remix of "Timeless" featuring Vince Staples which had already been leaked on the internet earlier. In December 2017, Blake released a cover of the song "Vincent" by Don McLean alongside a performance video shot in the studio.

=== 2018–2020: Assume Form ===
On 11 January 2018, Blake co-wrote and performed alongside Jay Rock, Kendrick Lamar, and Future on the single "King's Dead" from Rock's album Redemption and the soundtrack Black Panther: The Album. The song was commercially successful, reaching number 21 in the United States and number 50 in the United Kingdom; later, the song (alongside Anderson .Paak's "Bubblin") would receive the Grammy Award for Best Rap Performance at the 2019 ceremony. Blake also appeared on another track from the Black Panther soundtrack album, "Bloody Waters", which Blake co-wrote alongside Lamar, Mark Spears, Robin Braun and Ab-Soul.

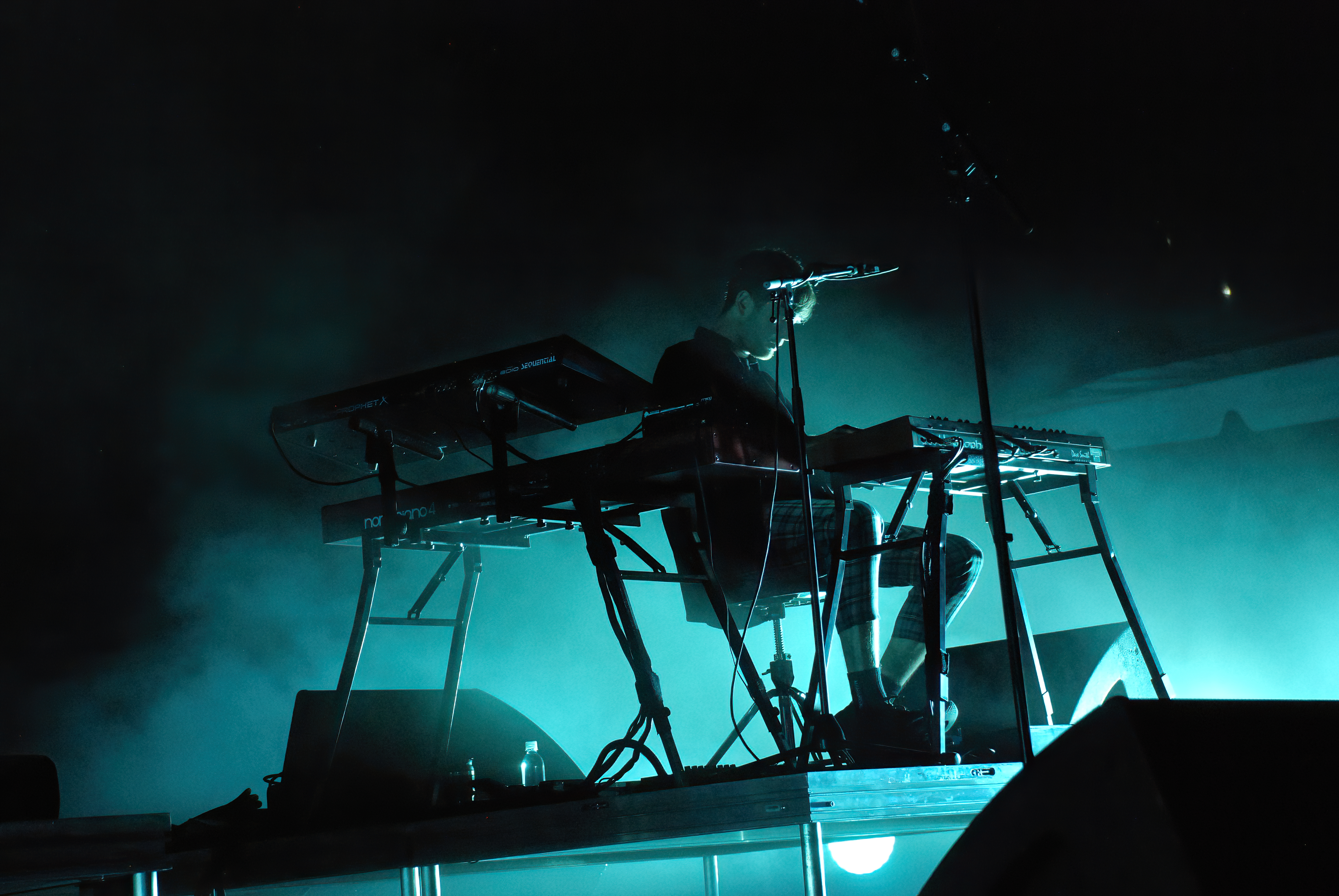
Blake performing at Hopscotch Music Festival 2019

On 26 January 2018, Blake released a new single, "If the Car Beside You Moves Ahead", alongside its music video, having premiered at his BBC Radio 1 residency. Blake's second solo single of that year, "Don't Miss It", was shared on 24 May alongside a lyric video and was released the next month. Despite receiving acclaim from music critics, a less positive review by Kevin Lozano of Pitchfork described the track as "sad boy music" prompted a response from Blake, who said "I can't help but notice, as I do whenever I talk about my feelings in a song, that the words 'sad boy' are used to describe it. I've always found that expression to be unhealthy and problematic when used to describe men just openly talking about their feelings."

Blake mixed and worked on additional production on the ninth album by the American electronic musician Oneohtrix Point Never, titled Age Of, which was released in June 2018. He also co-wrote and was featured on the track "Stop Trying to Be God" from Travis Scott's third studio album, Astroworld, and made an appearance in the song's music video.

In December 2018, Blake announced that he would be embarking on a tour of North America in February/March 2019. People who had purchased tickets for the North America tour also received a copy of his forthcoming album. Later that month Blake teased new material with André 3000 during a show in Brooklyn, his second collaboration with the artist after "Look Ma No Hands" on which Blake provided the piano part, which was released earlier that year. In early January 2019, Amazon.fr accidentally leaked details of Blake's fourth album, Assume Form, including its track listing and a list of features including collaborations with André 3000, Travis Scott and Metro Boomin. Soon after, LED billboards appeared in London and New York promoting the album. The album's release date was later confirmed to be on 18 January 2019 due to advertising in the London Underground. The day prior to the album's release, Blake released the tracks "Mile High" featuring Travis Scott and Metro Boomin and "Lullaby for My Insomniac", respectively. Following the album's release, the tracks "Barefoot in the Park" and "Mulholland", the latter of which is only included on the vinyl version of Assume Form, were released as singles on 4 and 26 April respectively, the former accompanied by a music video.

Blake released several new tracks throughout 2020, including "You're Too Precious", as well as the Before EP in October.

=== 2021–2023: Friends That Break Your Heart and Playing Robots Into Heaven ===
Blake released his fifth album, Friends That Break Your Heart, on 8 October 2021, following a delay due to the COVID-19 pandemic. A mostly stylistically traditional release, the record was followed-up by an ambient album titled Wind Down on 18 March 2022, created with German artificial intelligence media company Endel to help listeners fall asleep. The following year saw Blake collaborate with several hip hop artists, such as Kanye West, Flatbush Zombies, JID and Don Toliver. Blake released his sixth album, Playing Robots Into Heaven, on 8 September 2023. The album features electronic, dance, and experimental music and was seen by critics as a return to his musical roots. The lead single, "Big Hammer", was released on 28 June 2023. A heist-themed music video was directed by Oscar Hudson and follows around three robbers in white tracksuits.

=== 2024–Present: CMYK Group and Trying Times ===
James Blake @ TivoliVredenburg, Utrecht (2026)

In 2024, Blake left Polydor Records and formed his own production house and record label, as part of his brand CMYK Group. In May 2024, he released his first single as an independent artist, "Thrown Around". The following month, Blake released the EP "CMYK 002" and Bad Cameo, a collaborative album with Lil Yachty. Blake contributed "Séance", a track created with Ludwig Göransson, to the Sinners (2025) film soundtrack after Göransson (the film's composer) approached him and offered to collaborate.. He worked with Göransson again, in 2026, providing vocals for "When I'm Home", the end credits song for Christopher Nolan's feature film The Odyssey, along with rapper Travis Scott.

On 23 January 2026, Blake released the song "Death of Love" as the first single from his seventh studio album Trying Times, which was released on 13 March through independent label Good Boy Records.

In July 2026, Blake performed an intimate concert session filmed at Apple Music Studios in Los Angeles. He utilized a very specialized venue where his stated goal was to bring the audience into the music so that they felt like they were part of the studio process. The performance featured fresh interpretations of “Make Something Up,” “I’ll Come Too,” “I Had a Dream She Took My Hand,” Frank Ocean’s “Godspeed,” “Are You in Love?” and “Feel It Again.”

== Personal life ==
Blake was previously in a relationship with American musician Theresa Wayman and has been in a relationship with British actress Jameela Jamil since 2015.

== Musical style ==
Blake is a baritone. His early releases are experimental and electronic in style, influenced by UK bass music such as dubstep and 2-step garage. On releases such as The Bells Sketch, CMYK and Klavierwerke, Blake's own voice is obscured and processed, also incorporating vocal samples from '90s R&B, prominent sub-bass frequencies, and uneven, sparse rhythms. Blake's work was described by journalists as "post-dubstep", alluding to his progress beyond the style's initial characteristics. By the time of his 2011 debut album, Blake's vocals and piano had become more prominent while traditional song structures became increasingly apparent, reflecting the influence of gospel and soul.

His second album Overgrown (2013) continued this trend, integrating an electronic approach with balladry and Blake's soul-inflected vocals. Describing his stylistic development in 2013, music critic and theorist Mark Fisher wrote that "listening back to Blake's records in chronological sequence is like hearing a ghost gradually assume material form; or it's like hearing the song form (re)coalescing out of digital ether." Dash Lewis of Pitchfork summarized his career as a "journey from club deconstructionist to pop auteur," describing his 2021 album Friends That Break Your Heart as a "brightly colored, features-heavy singer-songwriter collection that careened through genres, light-years from the minimalism of his early work." His 2023 album Playing Robots into Heaven marked a partial return to his electronic club roots.

Blake was formatively influenced by the sparse dubstep of Burial and Digital Mystikz alongside singer-songwriters such as Stevie Wonder, D'Angelo, Joni Mitchell, and Sly Stone. In 2016, Blake revealed that a primary inspiration for his live performances was the Jimi Hendrix live album Band of Gypsys (1970), stating that "I want to be that. It's so free." In a 2026 interview, Blake said of his creative process: "I almost always improvise something, then chop it or create something from it. I go through a lot of different gear. I try different things. I've probably sat with for at least a few hours every sequencer on the market, just to see, or something analogous to it, just to see what I can come up with."

== Discography ==
Solo studio albums

- James Blake (2011)
- Overgrown (2013)
- The Colour in Anything (2016)
- Assume Form (2019)
- Friends That Break Your Heart (2021)
- Playing Robots into Heaven (2023)
- Trying Times (2026)

Collaborative albums

- Wind Down (with Endel) (2022)
- Bad Cameo (with Lil Yachty) (2024)

== Awards and nominations ==
Blake has won a Mercury Music Prize from two nominations, two Grammy Awards from nine nominations, a Latin Grammy Award, and three Brit Award nominations.

On 19 July 2011, Blake was nominated for the Mercury Prize 2011 for his self-titled debut album; the award was won by PJ Harvey. However, in 2013, he was nominated again for Overgrown, and subsequently won the award, the result being announced on 30 October. The judges at the event described his album as "...late-night music for the digital age. An inventive, poignant and poetic record of great beauty".

He was also nominated for Best New Artist at the 2014 Grammy Awards, he won one out of five Grammy Awards nominations.

Award	Year	Category	Nominated work	Result	Ref.
Berlin Music Video Awards	2018	Best Experimental	"If the Car Beside You Moves Ahead"	Nominated	
Berlin Music Video Awards	2022	Best Narrative	SAY WHAT YOU WILL	Nominated	
Berlin Music Video Awards	2024	Best Editor	Big Hammer	Nominated	
Berlin Music Video Awards	2025	Best Concept	"Thrown Around"	Nominated	
BBC Sound of...	2011	BBC Sound of 2011	James Blake	2nd place	
Brit Awards	2011	Critic's Choice	James Blake	Nominated	
Brit Awards	2012	British Male Solo Artist	James Blake	Nominated	
Brit Awards	2014	British Male Solo Artist	James Blake	Nominated	
Grammy Awards	2014	Best New Artist	James Blake	Nominated	
Grammy Awards	2017	Album of the Year	Lemonade (as featured artist and producer)	Nominated	
Grammy Awards	2019	Best Rap Song	"King's Dead"	Nominated	
Grammy Awards	2019	Best Rap Performance	"King's Dead"	Won	
Grammy Awards	2020	Best Alternative Music Album	Assume Form	Nominated	
Grammy Awards	2022	Best Dance/Electronic Recording	"Before"	Nominated	
Grammy Awards	2024	Best Dance/Electronic Recording	"Loading"	Nominated	
Grammy Awards	2024	Best Dance/Electronic Album	Playing Robots into Heaven	Nominated	
Grammy Awards	2024	Best Rap Song	"Scientists & Engineers" (as songwriter)	Won	
Ivor Novello Awards	2012	Best Contemporary Song	"The Wilhelm Scream"	Nominated	
Ivor Novello Awards	2014	Best Contemporary Song	"Retrograde"	Won	
Ivor Novello Awards	2022	Best Contemporary Song	"Coming Back" (featuring SZA)	Nominated	
Latin Grammy Awards	2022	Album of the Year	Motomami (as songwriter and producer)	Won	
Mercury Prize	2011	Best Album	James Blake	Nominated	
Mercury Prize	2013	Best Album	Overgrown	Won	
MTV Video Music Awards	2020	Best Editing	"Can't Believe the Way We Flow"	Nominated	
MTV Video Music Awards Japan	2012	Best New Artist	"Limit to Your Love"	Nominated	
MTV Video Music Awards Japan	2012	Best Dance Video	"Limit to Your Love"	Nominated	
mtvU Woodie Awards	2014	Best Collaboration Woodie	"Life Round Here" (featuring Chance the Rapper)	Nominated	
Music Producers Guild Awards	2014	UK Album of the Year	Overgrown	Nominated	
Q Awards	2011	Breakthrough Artist	James Blake	Nominated	
UK Music Video Awards	2011	Best Alternative Video - UK	"Lindisfarne"	Nominated	
UK Music Video Awards	2012	Best Alternative Video - UK	"A Case of You"	Nominated	
UK Music Video Awards	2012	Best Cinematography in a Video	"A Case of You"	Nominated	
UK Music Video Awards	2012	Best Telecine in a Video	"A Case of You"	Nominated	
UK Music Video Awards	2013	Best Alternative Video - UK	"Overgrown"	Nominated	
UK Music Video Awards	2013	Best Colour Grade In a Video	"Retrograde"	Nominated	
UK Music Video Awards	2019	Best Artist	James Blake	Nominated	
UK Music Video Awards	2019	Best Alternative Video - UK	"Can't Believe the Way We Flow"	Nominated	
UK Music Video Awards	2019	Best Editing in a Video	"Can't Believe the Way We Flow"	Nominated	
UK Music Video Awards	2021	Best Alternative Video - UK	"Say What You Will"	Won	
UK Music Video Awards	2021	Best Performance in a Video	"Say What You Will"	Nominated	
UK Music Video Awards	2021	Best Hip Hop/Grime/Rap Video - UK	"Feel Away" (with slowthai and Mount Kimbie)	Nominated	
UK Music Video Awards	2023	Best Dance/Electronic Video – UK	"Big Hammer"	Won	
UK Music Video Awards	2023	Best Editing in a Video	"Big Hammer"	Nominated	
UK Music Video Awards	2024	Best Dance/Electronic Video – UK	"Thrown Around"	Pending	
UK Music Video Awards	2024	Best Dance/Electronic Video – UK	"Playing Robots in Heaven"	Pending	
UK Music Video Awards	2024	Best Cinematography in a Video	"Playing Robots in Heaven"	Pending	
World Music Awards	2014	World's Best Male Artist	James Blake	Nominated	
World Music Awards	2014	World's Best Live Act	James Blake	Nominated	
World Music Awards	2014	World's Best Entertainer	James Blake	Nominated	

Preceded by Marina and the Diamonds	Sound of... Runner-up; 2011	Succeeded by Frank Ocean
