= Modern Soul (song) =

Single by James Blake

from the album The Colour in Anything
- Released: 11 February 2016
- Length: 5:33
- Label: Polydor
- Songwriter(s): James Blake
- Producer(s): James Blake; Rick Rubin

"Modern Soul" is a song by English singer James Blake. It was released on 11 February 2016 as the first track from his album The Colour in Anything (2016).

== Release ==
Blake premiered "Modern Soul" in February 2016 during his BBC Radio 1 residency.

== Track listing ==
Digital download and streaming
No.	Title	Length
1.	"Modern Soul"	5:33
