= Retrograde (James Blake song) =

Single by James Blake

from the album Overgrown
- Released: 11 February 2013
- Recorded: 2012
- Genre: Soul; electronic
- Length: 3:43
- Label: Polydor
- Songwriter: James Blake
- Producer: James Blake

James Blake singles chronology
"A Case of You" (2011)	"Retrograde" (2013)	"Overgrown" (2013)

"Retrograde" is a song by English electronic music producer and singer-songwriter James Blake. The song was released as a digital download on 11 February 2013 as the lead single from his second studio album Overgrown (2013). The song was written, produced and recorded by Blake, and the music video was directed by Martin de Thurah.

== Chart performance ==
=== Weekly charts ===
Chart (2013)	Peak position
Australia (ARIA)	56
Denmark (Tracklisten)	10
Japan (Japan Hot 100)	99
UK Singles (Official Charts)	87

=== Year-end charts ===
Chart (2013)	Position
Australia Streaming Tracks (ARIA)	67

== Certifications ==
Region	Certification	Certified units/sales
Australia (ARIA)	Gold	35,000^{‡}
New Zealand (RMNZ)	Gold	7,500^{*}
United Kingdom (BPI)	Gold	400,000^{‡}
Streaming
Denmark (IFPI Danmark)	Gold	900,000^{†}
^{*} Sales figures based on certification alone.^{‡} Sales+streaming figures based on certification alone.^{†} Streaming-only figures based on certification alone.

== Release history ==
Region	Date	Format	Label
United Kingdom	11 February 2013	Digital download	Polydor Records

== In pop culture ==
The song is featured in several episodes of television shows, including: the extended trailer for season one of The Leftovers, as well as in the pilot episode; the 5th season of The Blacklist; season 1, episode 2 of the Italian Netflix series Baby; episode 1 of the series Rush; season 3, episode 6 of the series Suits; and the episode "Falling Angels – Part 1" of the BBC series Silent Witness.

The song also appears in the fifth episode of the video game Tales from the Borderlands.

Covers

It was covered by Australian singer Karen Lee Andrews in her 2014 single, Ride, under her former stage name, Ms Murphy.

A cover was included on Jess Gillam’s 2020 album, “Time” (arranged by Rimmer/Maydew).
