= Enough Thunder =

EP by James Blake
- Released: 7 October 2011
- Recorded: 2011
- Genre: Soul; electronic; post-dubstep
- Length: 25:31
- Label: ATLAS; A&M; Polydor
- Producer: James Blake; Justin Vernon; Miti Adhikari

James Blake chronology
James Blake (2011)	Enough Thunder (2011)	Love What Happened Here (2011)

Singles from Enough Thunder
- 1. "Fall Creek Boys Choir" Released: 29 August 2011; 2. "A Case of You" Released: 19 December 2011

Enough Thunder is the fourth solo EP by English singer-songwriter James Blake. The EP showcases more soul music than the experimental dubstep and electronic sounds of his self-titled debut album.

The EP contains a collaboration with Bon Iver and a Joni Mitchell cover.

The EP was bundled with the deluxe edition of Blake's self-titled debut album, as well as being a standalone release.

== Reception ==
The EP received a 64/100 on Metacritic indicating generally positive reviews. Entertainment Weekly's review stated that "The silky-voiced Brit's Bon Iver-assisted EP is lush enough to be played at a swanky restaurant, but it may be even better suited to an evening alone with a hard drink." Consequence of Sound's Mohammad Choudhery wrote of Blake, "he continues to grow into one of the most compelling musicians today." Pitchfork Media gave it a 6.4/10, commending Blake's "fighting [of] the good fight."

== Track listing ==
All tracks written and produced by James Blake except where noted.

No.	Title	Writer(s)	Producer(s)	Length
1.	"Once We All Agree"			4:23
2.	"We Might Feel Unsound"			4:00
3.	"Fall Creek Boys Choir" (with Bon Iver)	Blake; Justin Vernon	Blake; Vernon	4:33
4.	"A Case of You"	Joni Mitchell	Miti Adhikari	2:57
5.	"Not Long Now"			5:23
6.	"Enough Thunder"			4:15
Total length:				25:31

Notes

- "A Case of You" was recorded for BBC Radio 1's Zane Lowe Show, first transmitted 9 February 2011.

== Personnel ==
- James Blake – writing (tracks 1–3, 5, 6), performance (tracks 1, 2, 4–6), production (tracks 1–3, 5, 6), recording (tracks 1, 2, 5, 6)
- Rob McAndrews – guitar (track 1)
- Justin Vernon – writing, production (track 3)
- Miti Adhikari – production (track 4)
- George Thomas – engineer (track 4)
- Dan Foat – management, A&R
- Matt Colton – mastering
- Romy Madley Croft – photograph
- Will Bankhead – design
