= Playing Robots into Heaven =

Studio album by James Blake
- Released: 8 September 2023
- Length: 42:39
- Label: Republic; Polydor
- Producer: James Blake

James Blake chronology
| Wind Down (2022) | Playing Robots into Heaven (2023) | CMYK 002 (2024) |

Singles from Playing Robots into Heaven
- 1. "Big Hammer" Released: 28 June 2023; 2. "Loading" Released: 26 July 2023

Playing Robots into Heaven is the sixth studio album by English singer-songwriter James Blake. It was released on 8 September 2023 through Republic and Polydor Records.

== Background ==
Blake released his fifth studio album Friends That Break Your Heart on 8 October 2021, following a delay due to the COVID-19 pandemic. A mostly stylistically traditional release, the record was followed up by an ambient album titled Wind Down on 18 March 2022, created with German artificial intelligence media company Endel to help listeners fall asleep. The following year saw the musician collaborate with several hip-hop artists, including Kanye West, Flatbush Zombies, JID and Don Toliver.

First previews of new music were teased on his social media accounts in early 2022. Blake announced the album on 28 June 2023. His sixth studio record sees him "return to the electronic roots of his Hessle, Hemlock and R&S records days". Unlike his previous releases, the album does not feature any guest appearances. To support the album, Blake will embark on an international 14-date tour with stops in Europe and North America.

The artist released the lead single "Big Hammer" the same day. The "trap-inspired" "instrumental club track" features sample loops of "chopped-up dancehall" vocals by Ragga Twins. A heist-themed music video was directed by Oscar Hudson and follows around four robbers in white tracksuits.

A second single, "Loading" followed on 26 July 2023. According to Surej Singh at NME, the song featured "rhythmic drum patterns, cascading synths and layered vocals that give the tender and delicate track an emotional touch."

== Critical reception ==
Playing Robots into Heaven ratings
Aggregate scores
| Source | Rating |
|---|---|
| AnyDecentMusic? | 7.4/10 |
| Metacritic | 80/100 |
Review scores
| Source | Rating |
| AllMusic | 4/5 stars |
| Beats Per Minute | 74% |
| Clash | 7/10 |
| DIY | 4/5 stars |
| The Independent | 4/5 stars |
| The Line of Best Fit | 6/10 |
| MusicOMH | 4/5 stars |
| NME | 4/5 stars |
| Pitchfork | 7.8/10 |
| Under the Radar | 8/10 |

Playing Robots into Heaven was met with generally positive reviews. At Metacritic, which assigns a rating out of 100 to reviews from professional publications, the album received a weighted average score of 80, based on 18 reviews. Aggregator AnyDecentMusic? gave it 7.4 out of 10, based on their assessment of the critical consensus.

Reviewing the album for AllMusic, Paul Simpson proclaimed that in, "Recapturing the creativity that made his work stand out in the U.K. club scene around the turn of the 2010s, Playing Robots into Heaven is some of the most honest work of Blake's career". In Clash, Alex Rigotti stated that, "Playing Robots finds Blake not quite knowing how to juggle all these facets of his personality and throwing them all at the wall. There are flashes of gorgeous phrasing, incredible textures, and welcome experimentation, but the album is also completely all over the place. Still, Blake remains undeniably talented as a singer, songwriter and producer." Ben Tipple of DIY wrote that the album "presents James as he currently stands; at once nostalgic and forward-thinking, and firmly back behind the decks", describing it as having "newfound frenetic energy". Under the Radar critic Mariel Fechik said, "Though Playing Robots into Heaven recalls some of Blake's more inscrutable, cloistered years as a musician, it also offers the clarity and confidence of someone who could do anything—but has chosen this."

Writing for The Independent, Mark Beaumont claimed that, "Blake clearly revels in the invention and freedom of the exploit. 'Fall Back' comes across as a very organic, found-sound kind of ambient concoction, as if someone has worked out how to recycle DJ software out of firewood and hemp." At The Line of Best Fit, Elliot Burr felt that, "With skills and interests cemented across various styles, [Blake's] figuring out in real time exactly what he does best – providing floor fillers to club crowds or elevating his performances through complex production. Perhaps when he sings, 'Where are my wings? / they're loading', the artist is acknowledging that he's still to assume his most resolute form yet." Josh LaClair of Beats Per Minute said, "The majority of Playing Robots into Heaven is still very good, but the album is missing the skyscraping highs of past tracks like "The Wilhelm Scream" or "Retrograde", and its cohesiveness is hampered by a few lesser songs that have slipped past the slackened quality control department." For Pitchfork, Dash Lewis concluded, "The results make for an inspired evolution of his sound, with Blake occasionally glancing in the rearview mirror as he moves in a new direction."

=== Year-end lists ===
Select year-end rankings of Friends That Break Your Heart
| Critic/Publication | List | Rank | Ref. |
|---|---|---|---|
| BrooklynVegan | BrooklynVegan's Top 55 Albums of 2023 | 43 | |
| Complex UK | Complex UK's Best Albums of 2023 | 13 | |
| NME | The Best Albums of 2023 | 40 | |
| PopMatters | The 80 Best Albums of 2023 | 59 | |

=== Industry awards ===
Awards and nominations for Playing Robots into Heaven
| Year | Ceremony | Category | Result | Ref. |
|---|---|---|---|---|
| 2024 | Grammy Awards | Best Dance/Electronic Album | Nominated | |

== Track listing ==
Playing Robots into Heaven track listing
| No. | Title | Writer(s) | Producer(s) | Length |
|---|---|---|---|---|
| 1. | "Asking to Break" | James Blake; Dom Maker | Blake; Maker^{[c]}; Jameela Jamil^{[a]} | 2:52 |
| 2. | "Loading" | Blake; Maker; Chris Trowbridge; Judie Tzuke; Mike Paxman | Blake; Maker^{[c]}; Jamil^{[a]}; Rob McAndrews^{[a]} | 4:44 |
| 3. | "Tell Me" | Blake; McAndrews | Blake; McAndrews^{[c]}; Maker^{[a]} | 5:00 |
| 4. | "Fall Back" | Blake; Brittany Talia Hazzard; James Sencherey-Evans | Blake | 4:01 |
| 5. | "He's Been Wonderful" | Blake; Thomas Lee Barrett | Blake | 3:21 |
| 6. | "Big Hammer" | Blake; David Steven Destouche; Trevor Paul Destouche | Blake; McAndrews^{[a]} | 4:00 |
| 7. | "I Want You to Know" | Blake; Calvin Cordozar Broadus Jr.; Chad Hugo; Pharrell Williams; Sencherey-Evans | Blake; Maker^{[a]}; McAndrews^{[a]}; Khushi^{[a]} | 4:47 |
| 8. | "Night Sky" | Blake; McAndrews | Blake | 3:39 |
| 9. | "Fire the Editor" | Blake; McAndrews | Blake; McAndrews^{[c]}; Jamil^{[a]} | 3:57 |
| 10. | "If You Can Hear Me" | Blake; Maker | Blake; Maker^{[c]} | 2:24 |
| 11. | "Playing Robots into Heaven" | Blake | Blake | 3:54 |
| Total length: | | | | 42:39 |

Notes

- ^{^[c]}signifies a co-producer
- ^{^[a]}signifies an additional producer
- "Loading" interpolates "Stay With Me Till Dawn", performed by Judie Tzuke.
- "I Want You to Know" interpolates "Beautiful", performed by Snoop Dogg, and featuring vocals by Pharrell and Charlie Wilson.

== Personnel ==
Credits adapted from official liner notes.

- James Blake – vocals, mixing, engineering, recording
- Matt Colton – mastering, immersive mix engineering
- Rob McAndrews – mixing (track 3), recording (8)
- Joshua Smith – engineering (3, 10), recording (10)
- Vic Wainstein – recording (7)
- Scott Garrett Graham – engineering assistance (3)
- Yaw Evans – drum programming (4, 7)
- Ragga Twins – vocals (6)

== Charts ==
Chart performance for Playing Robots into Heaven
| Chart (2023) | Peak position |
|---|---|
| Belgian Albums (Ultratop Flanders) | 24 |
| Belgian Albums (Ultratop Wallonia) | 92 |
| French Albums (SNEP) | 192 |
| German Albums (Offizielle Top 100) | 32 |
| Scottish Albums (OCC) | 27 |
| Swiss Albums (Schweizer Hitparade) | 75 |
| UK Album Downloads (OCC) | 19 |
| UK Dance Albums (OCC) | 1 |
| US Top Dance Albums (Billboard) | 13 |
