= Dizzy Heights (Neil Finn album) =

Studio album by Neil Finn
- Released: February 7, 2014
- Genre: Rock, alternative
- Length: 46:54
- Label: Lester Records
- Producer: Dave Fridmann, Neil Finn

Neil Finn chronology
Goin' Your Way (2013)	Dizzy Heights (2014)	Out of Silence (2017)

Alternate release

Dizzy Heights, released in February 2014, is the third solo album by New Zealand singer-songwriter, Neil Finn.

== Overview ==
Dizzy Heights is the third solo studio album from Finn, following the 1998 release Try Whistling This and 2001 release One Nil (released as One All in the USA). This release follows a period in which Finn worked on other projects, including Crowded House and Pajama Club. The album debuted at #130 on The Billboard Top 200.

The album was recorded between Finn's Roundhead Studios and producer Dave Fridmann's Tarbox Studios in upstate New York, United States (US) in 2013. Musicians on the album include Finn's wife Sharon, his sons Liam and Elroy, and Sean Donnelly (SJD).

== Track listing ==
All songs were written by Neil Finn, except where noted.

1. "Impressions" – 4:36
2. "Dizzy Heights" – 3:07
3. "Flying In the Face of Love" (Neil Finn, Sharon Finn, Sean Donnelly) – 4:04
4. "Divebomber" – 4:52
5. "Better Than TV" – 3:34
6. "Pony Ride" (Neil Finn, Sharon Finn, Sean Donnelly) – 4:45
7. "White Lies and Alibis" – 5:49
8. "Recluse" – 5:27
9. "Strangest Friends" – 3:18
10. "In My Blood" (Neil Finn, Liam Finn, Elroy Finn, Connan Mockasin) - 3:50
11. "Lights of New York" – 3:33

=== Bonus tracks ===
1. "Your Next Move" (iTunes Download Bonus Track) – 3:00
2. "Animal vs Human" (CD Bonus Track) (Neil Finn, Sharon Finn, Sean Donnelly)

== Personnel ==
- Neil Finn - Guitar, Lead Vocals, Clarinet, Drums, Keyboards, Synthesiser, Vibraphone, Producer
- Liam Finn - Guitar, Percussion, Backing Vocals, Producer
- Sharon Finn - Bass, Backing Vocals
- Elroy Finn - Drums, Backing Vocals
- Victoria Kelly - String Arrangements
- Glenn Kotche - Body Percussion
- Ashley Brown - Cello
- Matt Chamberlain - Drums
- Sean Donnelly - Electronic Drums,, Backing Vocals
- Dave Fridmann - Engineer, Producer
- Greg Calbi - Mastering
- Will Ricketts - Percussion
- Aarahdna - Backing Vocals
- Madeleine Sami - Backing Vocals
- Mary Fridmann - Backing Vocals
- Benjamin Knapp - Whistling

== Charts ==
Chart (2014)	Peak position
The Billboard 200	130
