= Lightsleeper =

Studio album by Neil Finn and Liam Finn
- Released: 24 August 2018
- Studios: Roundhead Studios, Auckland, New Zealand
- Length: 48:57
- Labels: Inertia; PIAS
- Producers: Neil Finn; Liam Finn

Neil Finn chronology
Out of Silence (2017)	Lightsleeper (2018)

Liam Finn chronology
The Nihilist (2014)	Lightsleeper (2018)

Professional ratings
Aggregate scores
Source	Rating
Metacritic	68/100
Review scores
Source	Rating
AllMusic	3/5 stars
Paste	6.2/10
PopMatters	5/10

Lightsleeper, released 24 August 2018 is the first collaborative album by New Zealand father and son duo Neil Finn and Liam Finn.

The album includes the track "Hold Her Close", gifted by the Finns to New Zealand Prime Minister Jacinda Ardern on the occasion of the birth of Ardern's first child.

== Critical reception ==
Reviewing the album in The New Zealand Herald, Karl Puschmann wrote: "Each song is filled with little sonic details that are gradually revealed and melodies that take sudden turns to catch you off guard, but never sound anything less than completely natural and effortless." His verdict on the album was "Move aside Lennon/McCartney, we've got Finn/Finn."

== Singles ==
"Ghosts/Hold Her Close" and "Back to Life" were released as singles before the release of the album.

== Track listing ==
All songs were written by Neil Finn and Liam Finn, except where noted.

No.	Title	Length
1.	"Island of Peace - Prelude (Neil Finn)"	2:44
2.	"Meet Me in the Air (Neil, Sharon, Liam & Elroy Finn)"	4:42
3.	"Where's My Room"	7:01
4.	"Anger Plays a Part (Liam Finn)"	3:01
5.	"Listen (Neil Finn)"	3:27
6.	"Any Other Way"	3:49
7.	"Back to Life"	4:09
8.	"Hiding Place"	5:52
9.	"Ghosts"	3:32
10.	"We Know What It Means"	6:25
11.	"Hold Her Close"	4:12

The 12-inch double vinyl features the additional track "Troubles"

== Personnel ==
- Neil Finn – vocals (tracks 1–10), piano (tracks 2–10), Wurlitzer (tracks 3–4, 10), acoustic guitar (tracks 7–8 and 10), electric guitar (tracks 3 and 7), bass (tracks 7, 9–10), ARP Strings (track 4), synth (tracks 1–3, 6–7, 11), slide guitar (track 7), Mellotron (track 10), beats (track 1), drum synthesizer (track 5), Drums (track 3 (3rd movement only))
- Liam Finn – vocals (all tracks), electric guitar (tracks 2–5, 7, 9–10), bass (track 3, 5–8), beats (track 3, 6–7), drums (tracks 4 (4th movement only), 9), acoustic guitar (tracks 4, 8, 10–11), synth (tracks 4, 6–8, 11), sound effects (tracks 5, 8, 10), samples (track 5), loops (track 10)
- Elroy Finn – drums (tracks 2, 7), percussion (track 3), slide guitar (track 10)
- Sharon Finn – bass (tracks 2, 10), vocals (track 9)
- Mick Fleetwood – drums (tracks 4, 6 and 10), percussion (track 6)
- Connan Mockasin – electric guitar (tracks 2–3, 6), choir (tracks 1, 7)
- Elias Dendias – bouzouki (track 7)
- Spiros Anemogianis – accordion (track 7)
- Barnes Family – choir (tracks 1, 7)
- Devo Finns – choir (tracks 1, 7)
- Jimmy Metherrell – choir (tracks 1, 7)
- Elliot Finn – vocals (track 2)
- Harper Finn – whisper (track 2)
- Matthew Eccles – percussion (track 2)
- Kody Nielson – drums (track 3 (2nd movement only))
- Victoria Kelly – string arrangements (tracks 3, 8, 11)

== Charts ==
Chart (2018)	Peak position
Australian Albums (ARIA)	21
Belgian Albums (Ultratop Flanders)	180
Dutch Albums (Album Top 100)	146
New Zealand Albums (RMNZ)	8
Scottish Albums (Official Charts)	35
UK Albums (Official Charts)	83
