= I'll Be Lightning =

Studio album by Liam Finn
- Released: 23 July 2007 (New Zealand); 4 August 2007 (Australia); 22 January 2008 (International); Yep Roc Records (internationally)
- Genre: Indie rock
- Length: 69:03; 53:22 (CD)
- Label: Liberation Music (New Zealand/Australia)
- Producer: Liam Finn

Liam Finn chronology
I'll Be Lightning (2007)	Champagne in Seashells (2009)

Professional ratings
Review scores
Source	Rating
Allmusic	link
NME	7/10 stars
Q	4/5 stars
The Skinny	link
Spin	3.5/5 stars
Pitchfork Media	(7.6/10) link

I'll Be Lightning is the 2007 debut album by New Zealand artist Liam Finn. The album was recorded at his father Neil's Roundhead Studios in Auckland, New Zealand. The album is notable in that Liam plays most of the instruments himself. The album was made #42 in Q's 50 Best Albums of the Year 2008.

== Vinyl/Digital Track listing ==
All songs were written by Liam Finn, except where noted

1. "Turn Up the Birds"
2. "Better to Be"
3. "Second Chance"
4. "Gather to the Chapel"
5. "Lead Balloon"
6. "Fire in Your Belly" (Finn, Chris Garland)
7. "Music Moves My Feet"
8. "This Place Is Killing Me"
9. "I'd Rather Waste You Than the Money on My Phone" (Finn, Matt Eccles)
10. "Lullaby"
11. "I'll Be Lightning" (Finn, Connan Hosford)
12. "Remember When"
13. "Come Home Sam"
14. "I Found Noise at ATP"
15. "I Will Explode" (Finn, Eccles)
16. "Energy Spent"
17. "Wise Man"
18. "Wide Awake on the Voyage Home"
19. "Shadow of Your Man"

== CD Track Listing ==
All songs were written by Liam Finn, except where noted

1. "Better to Be" – 3:46
2. "Second Chance" – 4:52
3. "Gather to the Chapel" – 3:20
4. "Lead Balloon" – 4:15
5. "Fire in Your Belly" (Finn, Chris Garland) – 3:15
6. "Lullaby" – 2:02
7. "Energy Spent" – 4:08
8. "Music Moves My Feet" – 2:24
9. "Remember When" – 3:04
10. "Wise Man" – 5:17
11. "This Place Is Killing Me" – 4:06
12. "I'll Be Lightning" (Finn, Connan Hosford) – 4:14
13. "Wide Awake on the Voyage Home" – 5:37
14. "Shadow of Your Man" – 2:57

== Personnel ==
- Liam Finn - vocals, all instruments except noted
- Matt Eccles - drums on Lead Balloon, I'll Be Lightning, Remember When, I Will Explode, Wise Man; guitar and bass on I'd Rather Waste You Than The Money On My Phone
- Neil Finn - bass on I'll Be Lightning
- Connan Hosford - autoharp and vocals on I'll Be Lightning

=== Production ===
- Produced by Liam Finn
- Recorded at Roundhead Studios
- Engineered by Liam Finn, except Remember When and Wise Man (Neil Baldock)
