= Sessions at West 54th (Neil Finn album) =

Video by Neil Finn
- Released: 19 December 2000
- Recorded: 1999
- Genre: Folk rock
- Length: 74:00
- Label: Sony/Epic
- Producer: Allen Kelman

Neil Finn chronology
Try Whistling This (1998)	Sessions at West 54th (2000)	One Nil (2001)

Sessions at West 54th is a solo music video album released in December 2000 by New Zealand singer-songwriter, Neil Finn as part of the United States live musical television series, of the same name. His live performance was recorded in 1999 and mostly has tracks from Finn's debut solo album, Try Whistling This (June 1998), although it also included two tracks ("Fall at Your Feet" and "Don't Dream It's Over") from his recent group, Crowded House, and one ("I Got You") from his earlier group, Split Enz.

The concert was issued on DVD via Sony/Epic. It was produced by Allen Kelman and directed by Mike Chloe. Tim DiGravina of AllMusic rated the album at four-and-a-half-out-of-five stars and explained, "[he] throws every last ounce of passion into the session. Switching back and forth between ballads and rock flare-ups, Finn's crystal clear vocals and acoustic and electric guitars paint him as a perfect example of a first-rate singer/songwriter."

The album was released on vinyl a part of Record Store Day in April 2025.

== Track listing ==
1. "Try Whistling This"
2. "Addicted"
3. "Fall at Your Feet"
4. "Don't Dream It's Over"
5. "Twisty Bass"
6. "King Tide"
7. "I Got You"
8. "Astro"
9. "Faster Than Light"
10. "Loose Tongue"
11. "Souvenir"
12. "She Will Have Her Way"
13. "Truth"
14. "Last One Standing"
15. "Sinner"

== DVD release ==
The album was released on DVD on 19 December 2000. The DVD features standard 2.0 stereo audio as well as enhanced 5.1 surround sound audio, features standard full screen 1.33:1 display and was released only in the US in Region 1.
