= Myths 001 =

EP by Devonté Hynes and Connan Mockasin
- Released: 30 October 2015
- Length: 11:15
- Label: Kemado; Mexican Summer
- Producer: Devonté Hynes; Connan Mockasin

Devonté Hynes chronology
Palo Alto (2014)	Myths 001 (2015)	Fields (2019)

Connan Mockasin chronology
Caramel (2013)	Myths 001 (2015)	Soft Hair (2016)

Myths 001 is a collaborative extended play by English musician Devonté Hynes and New Zealand musician Connan Mockasin. It was released via Kemado Records and Mexican Summer on 30 October 2015.

== Critical reception ==
Evan Rytlewski of Pitchfork rated the EP 6 out of 10, saying, "There's enough here to demonstrate that Hynes and Mockasin have some chemistry, but not enough to fully show it off." Writing for Under the Radar, Marty Hill gave it a 6.5 out of 10, saying, "There’s a certain playfulness about the three track record that suggests it wasn’t written to be adored, and the effortless energy between the two makes for a buoyant little pop record."

== Track listing ==
Myths 001 track listing
No.	Title	Length
1.	"La Fat Fur"	2:31
2.	"Feelin' Lovely"	3:51
3.	"Big Distant Crush"	4:53
Total length:		11:15
