= Pajama Club (album) =

Studio album by Pajama Club
- Released: 9 September 2011
- Recorded: 2011
- Studio: Roundhead (Auckland)
- Genre: Indie rock
- Length: 43:29
- Label: Lester
- Producer: Sean Donnelly; Neil Finn

Pajama Club is the 2011 debut album by Pajama Club, the band formed by Crowded House songwriter Neil Finn, his wife Sharon Finn, and keyboard player Sean Donnelly. The album was released in Australia and New Zealand on 9 September 2011, 13 September in North America and 19 September in Europe.

The album is change in style from the material Finn performs with Crowded House, with a more groove oriented feel. Finn has stated that the Post-punk funk band ESG were a key inspiration on the album. Guitarist Johnny Marr plays on two tracks, Can't Put It Down Until It Ends and Go Kart.

== Chart performance and critical response ==
Professional ratings
Aggregate scores
Source	Rating
Metacritic	70/100
Review scores
Source	Rating
AllMusic	4/5 stars
The Guardian	4/5 stars
The Independent	3/5 stars
PopMatters	5/10 stars

The album was generally well received, and holds a 70% rating on Metacritic. Positive reviews included Caroline Sullivan of The Guardian, who called it a "welcome surprise" and praised its low-fi restraint, and Stephen Thomas Erlewine of Allmusic, who described it as Finn's most loose and fun work since the Finn Brothers Finn album. More critical reviews included Andy McGill of The Independent, who suggested that some tracks "lacked focus" but that the album overall "was a pleasant enough distraction"., and John Bergstrom of Popmatters, who felt the album "has very little to offer other than to prove that Finn can do edgy indie/garage if he wants to."

== Track listing ==
All songs were written by Neil Finn and Sharon Finn, except where noted.

1. "Tell Me What You Want" (N. Finn, S. Finn, Sean Donnelly) – 3:35
2. "Can't Put It Down Until It Ends" – 3:51
3. "These Are Conditions" – 2:38
4. "From a Friend to a Friend" – 5:15
5. "Golden Child" – 3:18
6. "Daylight" (N. Finn, S. Finn, Donnelly) – 3:53
7. "Go Kart" – 3:46
8. "Dead Leg" (N. Finn, S. Finn, Donnelly) – 3:37
9. "TNT for 2" – 4:33
10. "The Game We Love to Play" (N. Finn, Donnelly) – 3:42
11. "Diamonds in Her Eyes" – 5:16
