= Champagne in Seashells =

EP by Liam Finn & Eliza Jane
- Released: 21 September 2009
- Length: 20:06
- Label: Yep Roc Records
- Producer: Liam Finn

Liam Finn & Eliza Jane chronology
I'll Be Lightning (2007)	Champagne in Seashells (2009)	FOMO (2011)

Champagne In Seashells is the second release by Liam Finn, his first with Eliza-Jane Barnes. The EP was recorded at Neil Finn's Roundhouse Studios in New Zealand and released on 21 September 2009. Liam Finn had been touring constantly for about two years with Barnes, heavily influencing the EP's theme of homesickness. The vinyl of Champagne in Seashells was released on Finn's label New Adventure. It includes the bonus track "Captain Cat Is Crying" with lines from the Dylan Thomas poem Under Milk Wood.

== Track listing ==
All songs written by Liam Finn, except where noted

1. "Plane Crash" - 3:44
2. "Long Way to Go" (Finn, Barnes) - 2:46
3. "Won't Change My Mind" (Finn, Barnes) - 6:34
4. "Honest Face" - 3:43
5. "On Your Side" (Finn, Barnes) - 3:19

=== Vinyl track listing ===
The vinyl release includes the above and an additional track.

6. "Captain Cat Is Crying" – 8:30

== Charts ==
Chart (2009)	Peak position
Australia (ARIA Charts)	75
