= Out of Silence =

Out of Silence may refer to:

- Out of Silence (Yanni album), 1987
- Out of Silence (Neil Finn album), 2017
