= FOMO (disambiguation) =

The fear of missing out (FOMO) is the feeling of missing information, opportunity for social interaction, etc.

Fear of missing out, FOMO, or the Fear of Missing Out may also refer to:

- Fear of Missing Out (a.k.a. "FOMO"), a 2026 film
- FOMO, debut album by The Vaughns
- FOMO (album), album by Liam Finn
- The Fear of Missing Out, album by thenewno2
- "FOMO", song by South Korean singer Hwasa
- FOMO (TV channel), Israeli children's TV channel
