= The Colour in Anything =

Studio album by James Blake
- Released: 6 May 2016
- Recorded: 2014–2016
- Studios: London, UK; Shangri La Studios, Malibu, California
- Genres: R&B; electronic; soul
- Length: 76:13
- Label: Polydor
- Producers: James Blake; Rick Rubin; Justin Vernon

James Blake chronology
200 Press (2014)	The Colour in Anything (2016)	Assume Form (2019)

Singles from The Colour in Anything
- 1. "Modern Soul" Released: 11 February 2016; 2. "Timeless" Released: 14 April 2016; 3. "Radio Silence" Released: 5 May 2016; 4. "My Willing Heart" Released: 5 May 2016; 5. "I Need a Forest Fire" Released: 5 May 2016

The Colour in Anything is the third studio album by English singer-songwriter James Blake. It was released on 6 May 2016, by Polydor Records. It serves as the follow-up to his Mercury Prize-winning 2013 album Overgrown. It features contributions from Justin Vernon and Frank Ocean, and additional production work by Rick Rubin.

== Background and recording ==
In November 2014, Blake announced that his third album was "seventy percent done" and would be released in "about five months". In January 2015, he announced the album title of Radio Silence. He later stated that the album would feature Justin Vernon of Bon Iver and Kanye West, as well as guitar work from Connan Mockasin. In a May 2016 interview with BBC Radio 1, Blake stated that he began work on the album in his bedroom studio in South London, and after "running out of steam" went to United States to complete the recording at Shangri La Studios with producer Rick Rubin.

Recording involved writing contributions from Justin Vernon and singer Frank Ocean, the latter described by Blake as "a huge inspiration for this record". Regarding Kanye West's absence from the project, Blake clarified that "I wanted Kanye to be on the song "Timeless", but the verse didn’t materialize. I think a huge swath of things happened in his life, and I just stayed out of it". During this period, Blake also worked with singer Beyoncé on her 2016 album Lemonade, contributing to two tracks.

Blake reportedly "explored sitting at the piano and singing a lot more" during the album's conception, and developed a desire "to work with other people on my own projects" in an attempt to relinquish some control over his own work. Discussing the tone of the album in contrast to his previous work, he stated that "I realized that [when it comes to making music], it wasn't important whether I was happy or sad—it's about sensitivity and your reaction to the world. I wouldn't want to be one of those artists that keeps themselves in a perpetual cycle of anxiety and depression just to extract music from that".

== Promotion and release ==
On 11 February 2016, Blake premiered a new song, "Modern Soul", during his BBC Radio 1 residency. On 14 April, he again premiered a new song, "Timeless", and announced the completion of an album featuring 18 tracks.

On 28 April, social media posts by Blake and his label, 1-800 Dinosaur, reposted photos of a mural by children's novel illustrator Sir Quentin Blake (unrelated to James) that hinted at the new album title The Colour in Anything; these were confirmed as the new title and artwork of his album several days later. The murals were displayed in London and Brooklyn. On May 5, Blake unexpectedly announced that the album would be released at midnight.

== Critical reception ==
Professional ratings
Aggregate scores
Source	Rating
AnyDecentMusic?	7.5/10
Metacritic	78/100
Review scores
Source	Rating
AllMusic	3.5/5 stars
Entertainment Weekly	A−
The Guardian	4/5 stars
Mojo	4/5 stars
NME	4/5
The Observer	4/5 stars
Pitchfork	8.2/10
Q	3/5 stars
Rolling Stone	3.5/5 stars
Spin	7/10

Upon its release, The Colour in Anything received acclaim from critics. At Metacritic, which assigns a rating out of 100 to reviews from mainstream critics, the album received an average score of 78, based on 28 reviews, which indicates "generally favorable" reception. In a review for Pitchfork, Kevin Lozano wrote that Blake's music is "unparalleled, spacious, and impossibly textured". He goes on to write that "At the end of the day Blake just wants to prioritize happiness and self-knowledge above all else. It’s a thoroughly unhip statement that makes you believe smiling, even if it hurts, is the coolest possible thing in the world you can do". The Guardian wrote that "The Colour in Anything reaffirms that he stands apart from his new peers. His music is not nice; the production frequently evokes a disturbed mind, and over it he speaks of profound alienation".

In a lukewarm review for The New York Times, Ben Ratliff opined that the album "grows self-pitying, almost maudlin, in ways Blake has managed to avoid in the past simply by using more elusive lyrical metaphors". Resident Advisor noted that the production was "a notch above" Blake's previous work, making special mention of the tracks "Points" and "Modern Soul", but notes that the album grows "tiresome" through its midsection, and likens it to a "funeral procession". Some critics criticized the album's length, pointing to some tracks that could be cut for time. PopMatters compared Blake to rapper Drake, stating that "like Drake, he had it in him to release a great album here. He just chose not to", while describing much of the album as "colorless and tedious, with Blake’s typical lugubriousness added in".

British mastering engineer Ian Shepherd praised the album's sound, declaring that "It has depth, it has weight, it has space [...] That’s the dynamics, doing what they’re meant to do, in music – giving you goosebumps. Of course it’s a superb vocal performance too, that goes without saying – but trust me, it wouldn’t have anything like the impact if it was crushed and distorted the way so many recent releases are. And unlike those releases, where I inevitably turn them down lower and lower over time, exhausted by the constant maxed-out wall-of-sound, listening to this album loud feels great – and I want to keep listening".

=== Accolades ===
Publication	Accolade	Rank	Ref.
Albumism	30 Best Albums of 2016	1	
The Guardian	The Best Albums of 2016	28	
Mojo	The 50 Best Albums of 2016	37	
Stereogum	The 50 Best Albums of 2016	42	
The Skinny	Top 50 Albums of 2016	28	

== Track listing ==
All tracks written and produced by James Blake, except where noted.

No.	Title	Writer(s)	Producer(s)	Length
1.	"Radio Silence"			4:00
2.	"Points"		Blake; Rick Rubin	3:31
3.	"Love Me in Whatever Way"		Blake; Rubin	5:03
4.	"Timeless"			4:22
5.	"f.o.r.e.v.e.r."			2:40
6.	"Put That Away and Talk to Me"			3:57
7.	"I Hope My Life (1-800 Mix)"			5:40
8.	"Waves Know Shores"			2:55
9.	"My Willing Heart"	Blake; Frank Ocean	Blake; Rubin^{[b]}	4:02
10.	"Choose Me"			5:38
11.	"I Need a Forest Fire" (featuring Bon Iver)	Blake; Justin Vernon	Blake; Rubin^{[b]}	4:17
12.	"Noise Above Our Heads"		Blake; Rubin	5:03
13.	"The Colour in Anything"			3:33
14.	"Two Men Down"		Blake; Vernon^{[a]}; Rubin^{[b]}	6:01
15.	"Modern Soul"		Blake; Rubin	5:32
16.	"Always"			5:04
17.	"Meet You in the Maze"	Blake; Vernon	Blake; Vernon	4:55
Total length:				76:13

Notes

- ^{^[a]} signifies an additional producer
- ^{^[b]} signifies an executive producer

Sample credits

- "Radio Silence" contains an interpolation of "Hope She'll Be Happier" by Bill Withers.
- "Love Me in Whatever Way" features samples from "Giving Up" by Donny Hathaway.
- "Choose Me" features samples from "More" by Tamia.
- "Always" contains an interpolation of "Godspeed" by Frank Ocean.

== Personnel ==
- James Blake – writing (all tracks), production (all tracks), mixing (all tracks)
- Frank Ocean – writing (track 9)
- Justin Vernon – writing (tracks 11, 17), production (track 17), additional production (track 14)
- Rick Rubin – production (tracks 2, 3, 12, 15), executive production (tracks 9, 11, 14)
- Matt Mysko – engineer (track 5), recording engineer
- David Kim – engineer (track 13), recording engineer
- B.J. Burton – engineer (track 17)
- Jason Lader – modular synth (track 2), recording engineer
- Connan Mockasin – bass guitar (track 12)
- Chris Messina – vocoder effect (track 17)
- Matt Colton – mastering (all tracks)
- Dan Foat – management, A&R
- Josh Smith – recording engineer, mix assistance
- Sean Oakley – recording engineer
- Nathan Boddy – mix assistance
- Burgess Studio – design, art direction
- Sir Quentin Blake – illustration

== Charts ==
=== Weekly charts ===
Chart (2016)	Peak position
Australian Albums (ARIA)	16
Austrian Albums (Ö3 Austria)	68
Belgian Albums (Ultratop Flanders)	18
Belgian Albums (Ultratop Wallonia)	47
Canadian Albums (Billboard)	31
Danish Albums (Hitlisten)	21
Dutch Albums (Album Top 100)	20
French Albums (SNEP)	93
German Albums (Offizielle Top 100)	76
Irish Albums (IRMA)	16
Italian Albums (FIMI)	81
New Zealand Albums (RMNZ)	26
Norwegian Albums (VG-lista)	23
Portuguese Albums (AFP)	21
Scottish Albums (Official Charts)	36
Spanish Albums (Promusicae)	79
Swedish Albums (Sverigetopplistan)	47
Swiss Albums (Schweizer Hitparade)	19
UK Albums (Official Charts)	13
US Billboard 200	36
US Top Dance Albums (Billboard)	1

=== Year-end charts ===
Chart (2016)	Position
Belgian Albums (Ultratop Flanders)	164
US Top Dance/Electronic Albums (Billboard)	10
