= FOMO (album) =

Studio album by Liam Finn
- Released: June 2011
- Genre: Indie rock
- Label: Yep Roc Records
- Producer: Burke Reid, Liam Finn

Liam Finn chronology
Champagne in Seashells (2009)	FOMO (2011)	The Nihilist (2014)

FOMO is the 2011 album by New Zealand artist Liam Finn. The title is an acronym for the term "Fear Of Missing Out". The album received positive reviews by critics.

== Promotion and release ==
The album was released on CD, digital and 180-gram gatefold vinyl formats. The vinyl release include a download card for the bonus track 'Roll of the Eye (Live)'.

Some versions of the CD came with a copy of the 2010 debut album from BARB, a side project featuring Liam Finn, Connan Mockasin, Lawrence Arabia, Eliza Jane Barnes, Seamus Ebbs, Jol Mulholland and Wild Bill Rickets.

Finn began a tour across New Zealand in 2011 to promote the album.

== Critical reception ==
Professional ratings
Aggregate scores
Source	Rating
Metacritic	73/100
Review scores
Source	Rating
The New Zealand Herald	4/5 stars
All Music	4/5 stars
The Independent	8/10
Spin	7/10
Under the Radar	6/10

FOMO was met with positive reviews from music critics. On Metacritic, it has a weighted average score of 73 out of 100 based on 13 reviews, indicating "generally favorable reviews".

Stephen Humphries of Under the Radar drew complimentary comparisons to Crowded House in vocal style, and described the chorus on the single “Don’t Even Know Your Name" as "exhilarating". Jon Young of Spin also praised the vocal, writing that Finn delivered "sophisticated melodies and wistful vocals with masterful authority". Simmy Richman of The Independent wrote that the album has "dreamy, Beatles-esque pop songs with moments of electronic and percussive madness". In contrast, John Garratt was less positive in his review for PopMatters, writing "the golden moments are few and the bronze ones are many on FOMO, an album that offers much in the way of adequate, serviceable pop [...]".

== Track listing ==
All songs were written by Liam Finn, except where noted

1. "Neurotic World"
2. "Don't Even Know Your Name"
3. "Roll of the Eye"
4. "Cold Feet"
5. "Real Late" (Liam Finn, Jeremy Toy)
6. "The Struggle"
7. "Little Words"
8. "Reckless"
9. "Chase the Seasons"
10. "Jump Your Bones"

Bonus Track

1. "Life Isn't Stationary"

== Personnel ==
- Liam Finn – vocals
- Seamus Ebbs – Outro drums on 'Real Late'
- Glenn Kotche – Contact mic drums on 'Real Late' and 'Jump Your Bones'

== Credits ==
- Artwork – Sarah Larnach
- Design – Anns Taylor
- Engineer (Mixing Assistant) – Benjamin Knapp, Jeremy Toy, Jordan Stone, Liam Finn
- Engineer (Recording Assistant) – Benjamin Knapp
- Mastered by Steve Fallone
- Mixed by Tchad Blake (Tracks 1–4), Burke Reid (Tracks 5–10)
- Producers – Burke Reid, Liam Finn
- Recorded by Burke Reid
