= Aiming for Your Head =

Studio album by Betchadupa
- Released: 2004
- Genres: Pop, rock, power pop
- Label: Liberation Music
- Producer: Nick Launay

Betchadupa chronology
The Alphabetchadupa (2002)	Aiming for Your Head (2004)

Aiming for Your Head is the second and final studio album by New Zealand band Betchadupa, released in 2004. The album title's inspiration is about "Aiming for someone and trying to impress them or make it happen."

The track "Aiming for Your Head" was the theme song of the ABC children's show Blue Water High.

"My Army of Birds and Gulls" is on the Love My Way soundtrack album. Songwriter Liam Finn was inspired to write "My Army of Birds and Gulls" when he was jet lagged and kept awake by birds.

== Track listing ==
1. "My Army of Birds and Gulls"
2. "Who's Coming Through the Window?"
3. "Move Over"
4. "My Song"
5. "Diversions"
6. "Aiming for Your Head"
7. "The Ocean is the Cure"
8. "Weekend"
9. "RT 10 90"
10. "Design"
11. "The Bats of Darkwell Lane"
12. "Running Out of Time"
