= Radio Silence (James Blake song) =

Single by James Blake

from the album The Colour in Anything
- Released: 5 May 2016
- Genre: Electronic, experimental pop
- Length: 4:00
- Label: Polydor
- Songwriter: James Blake
- Producer: James Blake

"Radio Silence" is a song by English electronic music producer and singer-songwriter James Blake. It was released on 5 May 2016 as the third single from Blake’s third album, The Colour in Anything. The song features an interpolation of the Bill Withers song, 'Hope She'll Be Happier', and was built around a lyric from the song, however, this was never credited.

== Release and reception ==
The song was released a day prior to the release of The Colour in Anything through Polydor Records, alongside two other tracks from the album.

”Radio Silence” was met with positive reviews from music critics. Pitchfork deemed it as “Best New Track”, praising the instrumentalism and vocalism of the track.

== Track listing ==
No.	Title	Length
1.	"Radio Silence"	4:00
