= Infinite bisous =

Irish-English musician, composer, and record producer

infinite bisous
- Born: Rory McCarthy; Leicester, England
- Genres: Psychedelic pop; neo-psychedelia; dream pop
- Instruments: Synthesizer; vocals; bass guitar; guitar; percussion
- Years active: 2013–present
- Label: tasty morsels
- Website: infinitebisous.website

Rory McCarthy, better known by the stage name infinite bisous, is an Irish-English musician, composer, and record producer. He is also co-founder of Charnwood music collective, Tasty Morsels.

Active since 2013, Mccarthy has collaborated with artists such as Connan Mockasin, Mac DeMarco, Beck, Metronomy, and Flavien Berger. Songs from his debut album, W/ Love, were featured on the HBO series High Maintenance.

== Discography ==
Studio albums
Title	Album details
W/ Love	Released: March 15, 2017; Formats: Vinyl, digital download, streaming
Period	Released: March 11, 2019; Formats: Vinyl, digital download, streaming
Any-Day-Now	Released: May 30, 2022; Formats: Vinyl, digital download, streaming
épi	Released: April 15 2026; Formats: Vynil,digital download, streaming
