= Pajama Club =

New Zealand rock band

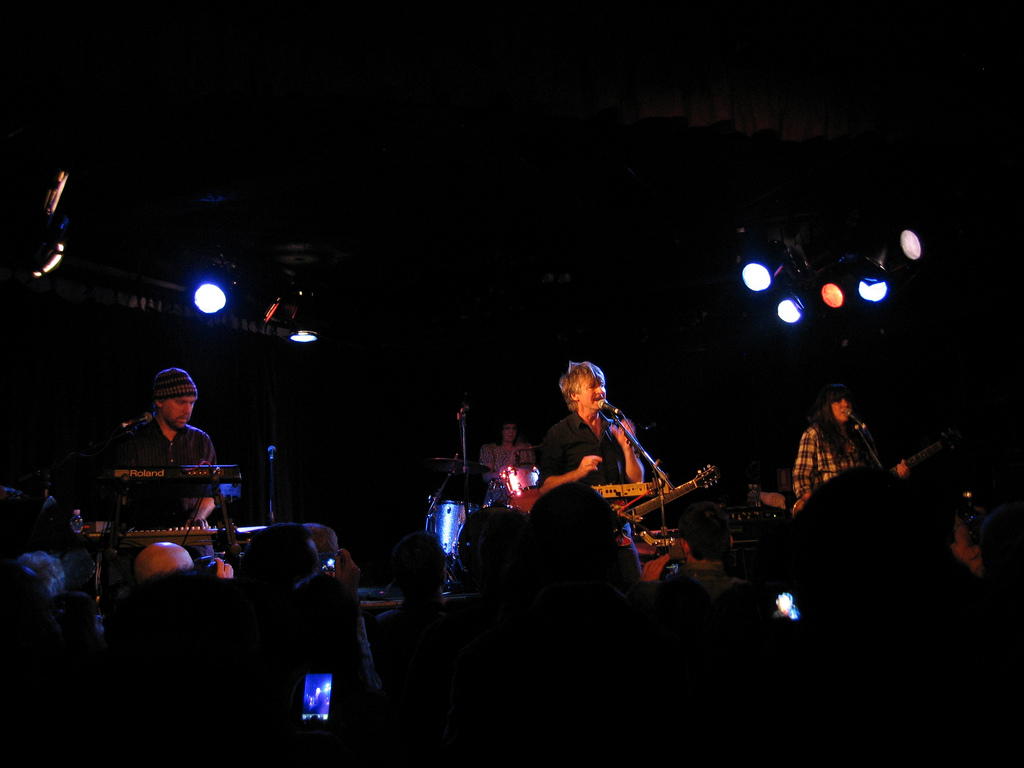
- Pajama Club at the Richmond Hotel, Melbourne 15 June 2011

Background information
- Origin: Auckland, New Zealand
- Genres: Indie rock
- Years active: 2011
- Label: Lester
- Members: Sharon Finn; Neil Finn; Sean Donnelly; Alana Skyring
- Website: pajamaclubmusic.com

Pajama Club are a rock band from Auckland, formed in 2011. They consist of Neil Finn, Sharon Finn, Sean Donnelly, and Alana Skyring.

After recording their first album with Neil Finn on drums (as well as guitars, keyboards and vocals), drummer Alana Skyring (formerly of The Grates) was added to the line-up as an official fourth member to play on live dates. They toured Australia in June 2011, East Coast USA in June and July 2011 and West Coast USA in August 2011.

These live dates all took place before the release of their album. Pajama Club's self-titled debut was released in September 2011 (9 September in Australia/New Zealand, 13th in North America and 19th in Europe). Since that time, Pajama Club has been inactive, though no formal announcement as to the band's current status has been made.

== Background ==
After Sharon and Neil Finn's children, Liam and Elroy, left the family home to pursue their own musical careers, the parents wondered what to do to fill the time left open by their children's absence. The two decided to repair the music room in their Auckland home and begin making music of their own: "We've had a bit more time on our hands since the boys left home, and we just decided to make a record. It was as simple as that. We called the group Pajama Club, because we were dressed in our pajamas when we started." (The group was in fact originally called Pajama Party, but was changed very early on due to another group having the same name.)

With Pajama Club, Sharon began to play the bass guitar, while Neil sat behind the drum set, despite the fact that neither had played either instrument before. Neil commented that "We found ourselves locking into these grooves which were incredibly fun to play...We naturally gravitated towards being 'funky'," drawing influence from South Bronx band ESG.

With Pajama Club, Neil employed a different style of songwriting, adding words to instrumentals as opposed to Crowded House's method of writing instrument parts after the lyrics. He felt energized by the experience: "It was all new to me, it felt like starting over. When you've been doing something for as long as I've been writing songs, you can feel like you've exhausted your reservoir of ideas. Discovering new methods, new angles on songwriting, was very exciting." The music takes influence from dub, disco, and funk, and uses motorik-style beats. He stated "Some people aren't gonna get it; it's not as 'songy', in a traditional way, as Crowded House...I like what happens when you keep yourself open to new things happening. It keeps the music fresh and alive." Pajama Club also features vocals from Sharon, who previously sang backing vocals on a number of Crowded House songs.

== Discography ==
- Pajama Club - 2011 Lester Records (CD/Vinyl/Download) (UK chart peak: #154, AUS: #61)
