= Out of Silence (Neil Finn album) =

Studio album by Neil Finn
- Released: 1 September 2017
- Recorded: 05, 12, 19, and 26 August 2017
- Studios: Roundhead, Auckland
- Length: 36:00
- Label: EMI Records
- Producers: Neil Finn, Liam Finn

Neil Finn chronology
Dizzy Heights (2014)	Out of Silence (2017)

Out of Silence, released 1 September 2017, is the fourth solo album by New Zealand singer-songwriter, Neil Finn. The making of the album was livestreamed on Finn's Facebook page.

== Critical reception ==
Metacritic rated the album as 84 out of 100. The New Zealand Herald described the album as "quietly astonishing" while The Music Australia rated it as 4 out of 5.

== Singles ==
"More Than One of You" and "Second Nature" were released as the first and second singles on 11 and 18 August 2017, respectively.

== Track listing ==
All songs were written by Neil Finn, additional writers noted below.

1. "Love Is Emotional" – 3:32
2. "More Than One of You" - 2:53
3. "Chameleon Days" - 4:35
4. "Independence Day" - 3:48
5. "Alone" (Tim Finn, Mervyn Peake) - 3:08
6. "Widow's Peak" (Sharon Finn) - 3:25
7. "Second Nature" - 3:50
8. "The Law Is Always on Your Side" - 2:23
9. "Terrorise Me" - 4:13
10. "I Know Different" - 4:14

== Personnel ==
- Neil Finn: piano, vocals
- Tim Finn: harmony vocals and acoustic guitar on "Alone"
- Elroy Finn: drums, percussion, guitar
- The Infinity Orchestra: strings
- Choir: Amelia Murray, Don McGlashan, EJ Barnes, Harper Finn, Hollie Fullbrook, James Milne, Jimmy Metherell, Reb Fountain, Samuel Flynn Scott, Sandy Mill, Sean Donnelly
- Victoria Kelly: string arrangements
- David Squire: choir director
- Sharon Finn: artwork
- Steve Dykes: photography
- Design: Anns Taylor
