= Joe Bramley =

New Zealand musician

- Born: Jonathan William Bramley; 1983 (age 41–42); Hong Kong
- Origin: New Zealand
- Occupation: Musician
- Instrument: Bass guitar

Jonathan William "Joe" Bramley (born August 12 1984) is a New Zealand musician.

Born in Hong Kong to parents Geoff Bramley and Janet Brice, Bramley has two siblings: older brother Nick Bramley and younger brother Richie Bramley. He has lived in Wellington (where he attended Scots College) and in Auckland (where he attended Auckland Grammar School), as well as in Melbourne, Australia (with the band Betchadupa). As of 2013 he lives in London.
