= Try Whistling This =

Studio album by Neil Finn
- Released: 15 June 1998
- Recorded: 1997–1998
- Length: 54:44
- Label: Parlophone; Work (US/Canada)
- Producer: Neil Finn; Tchad Blake; Marius De Vries; Jim Moginie

Neil Finn chronology
Try Whistling This (1998)	Sessions at West 54th (2000)

Try Whistling This is the debut solo album by the New Zealand singer/songwriter Neil Finn, released in 1998. It was produced by Finn, Tchad Blake, Marius De Vries, and Jim Moginie. The Japanese version of the album has a bonus track called "Tokyo", which also appears on the UK release of the single "Sinner". Special editions of the Australian CD contained a bonus CD with six extra tracks which were used as the B-sides for the singles released from the album. The album topped the charts in Australia and New Zealand, and also reached the top five of the UK Albums Chart.

Finn said a key inspiration for the album was the Beck album Mutations. He said: "I wasn't pretending to make a record like that, but I did like the fact that he was using computers and loops yet somehow it sounded like a garage band—there's a real skill to that."

== Critical reception ==
Professional ratings
Review scores
Source	Rating
AllMusic	4.5/5 stars

The Guardian wrote that Finn's "eternally yearning tones set him apart from other melodic late-thirtysomethings—though he also happens to write lovely, inexplicably underrated songs."

== Awards ==
In 1999, Try Whistling This won the New Zealand Music Award for Best Cover Art. The cover was drawn by Neil's young son, Elroy.

== Track listing ==
All songs were written by Neil Finn, except where noted.

1. "Last One Standing" – 3:04
2. "Souvenir" – 3:42
3. "King Tide" (Finn, Robert Moore) – 4:33
4. "Try Whistling This" (Finn, Jim Moginie) – 4:13
5. "She Will Have Her Way" – 3:56
6. "Sinner" (Finn, Marius De Vries) – 4:25
7. "Twisty Bass" – 5:09
8. "Loose Tongue" (Finn, Moginie) – 4:12
9. "Truth" (Finn, Moginie) – 4:03
10. "Astro" – 3:46
11. "Dream Date" – 4:51
12. "Faster Than Light" – 4:23
13. "Addicted" – 4:22

Australian edition bonus disc

1. "Tokyo" – 2:56
2. "Family Ties" – 3:11
3. "She Comes Scattered" – 3:36
4. "Identical Twin" – 3:30
5. "808 Song" – 3:30
6. "Log Drums" – 3:49

== Personnel ==
- Tony Allen – drums (track 11)
- Michael Barker – drums (tracks 3, 5, 6, 10), percussion (tracks 5, 6, 7, 8, 11)
- Lyn Buchannan – additional drums (track 1)
- Marius De Vries – programming (tracks 2, 3, 5, 6, 7, 8, 11, 13), keyboards (tracks 6 and 13)
- Liam Finn – drums (tracks 2, 8), guitar (track 5)
- Paddy Free – programming (track 7)
- Mitchell Froom – Hammond (tracks 10, 11, 12)
- Jim Moginie – guitars (tracks 4, 8, 10, 13), bass guitar (track 13), omnichord (track 13), percussion (track 13)
- Robert Moore – bass (track 8)
- Sebastian Steinberg – bass (tracks 1 to 6, 8, 9, 11)
- Pete Thomas – drums (tracks 1, 4, 9)
- Neil Finn – all other instruments

== Charts ==
=== Weekly charts ===
Chart (1998)	Peak position
Australian Albums (ARIA)	1
Dutch Albums (Album Top 100)	88
New Zealand Albums (RMNZ)	1
Norwegian Albums (VG-lista)	18
UK Albums (OCC)	5
US Heatseekers Albums (Billboard)	19

=== Year-end charts ===
Chart (1998)	Position
Australian Albums (ARIA)	44
New Zealand Albums (RMNZ)	26

== Certifications ==
Region	Certification	Certified units/sales
Australia (ARIA)	Platinum	70,000^{^}
^{^} Shipments figures based on certification alone.
