= Betchadupa =

New Zealand pop/rock group

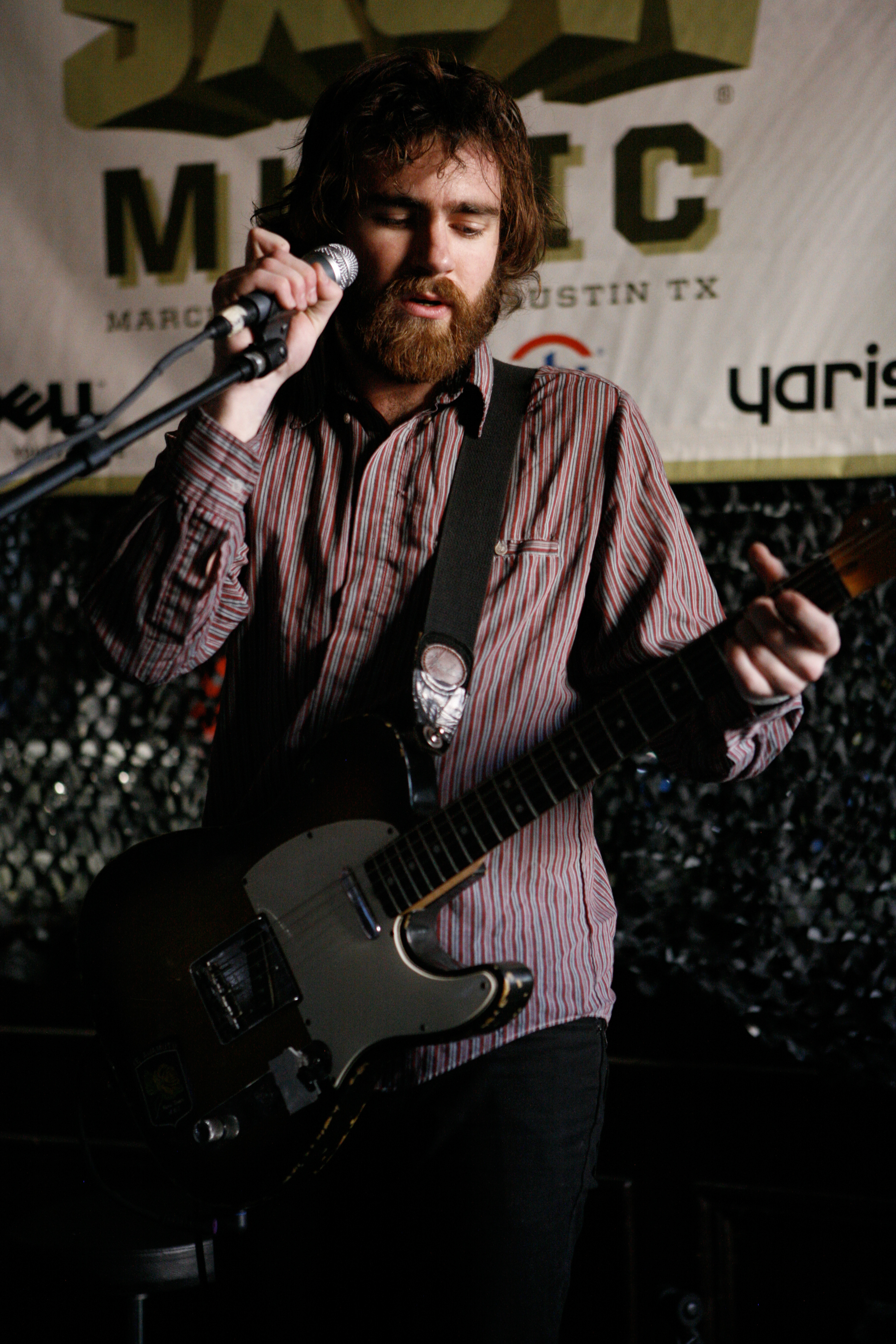
- Betchadupa's Liam Finn at South by Southwest in 2008.

Background information
- Origin: Auckland, Auckland Region, New Zealand
- Genres: Pop, rock
- Years active: 1997–2006
- Labels: Flying Nun, Liberation
- Past members: Liam Finn; Matt Eccles; Chris Garland; Joe Bramley

Betchadupa was a New Zealand pop/rock group, formed in Auckland, New Zealand, in 1997. The band featured Liam Finn, Chris Garland, Joe Bramley, and Matt Eccles.

Betchadupa (originally called Lazy Boy – the name change followed threatened legal action from the chair company of the same name) had its origins when Liam and Matt met whilst their families were on holidays in New Zealand. Their first song, written when both boys were 11, was called 'Gee This Sounds Good, I Can't Believe We Wrote It'. Their unique name was lifted from the text of a Polish-American's T-shirt that declared "You Betchadupa I'm Polish", dupa being the casual Polish word for arse.

The band based themselves in London, UK, after spending much of 2004 in Melbourne, Australia. The band have been on hiatus while Liam has undertaken a solo career. It is uncertain if the band will ever reform.

Betchadupa has had extensive experience playing with such bands as Queens of the Stone Age, Foo Fighters, Jane's Addiction and ended the year 2001 on a high playing alongside Pearl Jam's Eddie Vedder at the Neil Finn and Friends concert 7 Worlds Collide in Auckland, and being named Top New Act at the prestigious NZ Music Awards as well as becoming the toast of the South by Southwest Music Convention in Austin, Texas, in January 2003.

== Band members ==
- Liam Finn – vocals, guitar
- Chris Garland – guitar
- Joe Bramley – bass, backing vocals
- Matt Eccles – drums

== Discography ==
=== Albums ===
List of albums, with selected details and peak chart positions
Title	Details	Peak chart positions
Title	Details	NZ
The Alphabetchadupa	Released: 2002; Label: Flying Nun; Catalogue: FNCD465	2
Aiming for Your Head	Released: October 2004; Label: Liberation Music; Catalogue: LIBCD6133.2	32

=== EPs ===
List of EPs, with selected details and peak chart positions
Title	Details	Peak chart positions
Title	Details	NZ
Betchadupa	Released: 2000; Label: Flying Nun; Catalogue: FNCD445	43
The 3D EP	Released: 2001; Label: Flying Nun; Catalogue: FNCD455	30

=== Singles ===
Title	Year	Peak chart positions		Album
Title	Year	NZ	AUS	Album
"Empty Head"	2000	—	—	Betchadupa EP
"Bits"	2000	—	—	Betchadupa EP
"Spill the Light"	2000	—	—	Betchadupa EP
"Awake"	2000	—	—	Betchadupa EP
"Man on My Left"	2001	—	—	The 3D EP
"Sleepy News"	2001	26	—	The Alphabetchadupa
"Supa Day"	2002	29	—	The Alphabetchadupa
"Drop D"	2002	—	—	The Alphabetchadupa
"Life Will Be the Same"	2002	—	—	The Alphabetchadupa
"Move Over"	2003	14	62	Aiming for Your Head
"Aiming for Your Head"	2004	—	—	Aiming for Your Head
"Who's Coming Through the Window"	2006	—	—	Non-album singles
"The Bats of Darkwell Lane"	2006	—	—	Non-album singles
"The Money"	2020	—	—	Non-album singles

== Awards ==
Year	Nominee / work	Award	Result
2001	Betchadupa	Best New Act – New Zealand Music Awards	Won
2002	The Alphabetchadupa	Best Pop/Rock Release – BNet NZ Music Awards	Won
