= Caramel (album) =

Studio album by Connan Mockasin
- Released: 5 November 2013
- Genres: Psychedelic pop, ambient, soul, jangle pop, funk
- Length: 39:49
- Labels: Mexican Summer; Because Music; Phantasy

Connan Mockasin chronology
| Forever Dolphin Love (2011) | Caramel (2013) | Jassbusters (2018) |

Professional ratings
Aggregate scores
| Source | Rating |
|---|---|
| Metacritic | 70/100 |
Review scores
| Source | Rating |
| Allmusic | 3.5/5 stars |
| Consequence of Sound | D |
| The Fly | 3.5/5 stars |
| The Guardian | 4/5 stars |
| NME | (7/10) |
| The Observer | 4/5 stars |
| Paste | (9/10) |
| Pitchfork Media | (6.7/10) |
| Popmatters | (5/10) |
| Resident Advisor | 2.5/5 stars |

Caramel is the second studio-album of New Zealand psychedelic pop musician Connan Mockasin, released in November 2013.

Mockasin has said that in terms of the process of writing the album:

"It's just ideas in my head that I put together, and later on it might make more sense. But I don't think about the meaning at the time. Or I'm not aware of it."

As of January 2014, the album has received an overall score of 70 on Metacritic, indicating generally favourable reviews. Pitchfork gave the album 6.7 out of 10, concluding: "The word "caramel" is most readily embodied by this music's sensual, flirtatious leanings. Unfortunately, sometimes it seems to just mean "slow", i.e. the pace of swimming through caramel." The New Zealand Listener gave the album a positive review, noting that although the album is strongly influenced by others, "Mockasin is writing his own recipe, and although his Caramel may be an acquired taste for some, it is an undeniably crucial concoction."

== Track listing ==
| No. | Title | Length |
|---|---|---|
| 1. | "Nothing Lasts Forever" | 3:03 |
| 2. | "Caramel" | 1:54 |
| 3. | "I'm the Man, That Will Find You" | 5:01 |
| 4. | "Do I Make You Feel Shy?" | 3:14 |
| 5. | "Why Are You Crying?" | 5:24 |
| 6. | "It's Your Body 1" | 5:24 |
| 7. | "It's Your Body 2" | 3:16 |
| 8. | "It's Your Body 3" | 1:17 |
| 9. | "It's Your Body 4" | 1:41 |
| 10. | "It's Your Body 5" | 3:51 |
| 11. | "I Wanna Roll with You" | 5:44 |

== Chart positions ==
| Chart (2013) | Peak position |
|---|---|
| Belgian Albums (Ultratop Flanders) | 195 |
| UK Albums (OCC) | 193 |
| UK Independent Albums (Official Charts) | 38 |
