= The Nihilist (album) =

Studio album by Liam Finn
- Released: 2014
- Genre: Indie rock
- Label: Yep Roc Records
- Producer: Liam Finn

Liam Finn chronology
FOMO (2011)	The Nihilist (2014)

Professional ratings
Review scores
Source	Rating
AllMusic	4/5 stars
American Songwriter	4/5 stars
Blurt	4/5 stars
NME	3/5 stars
The New Zealand Herald	5/5 stars

The Nihilist (2014) is the third solo album by New Zealand artist Liam Finn.

== Production ==
The album was recorded in Brooklyn.

== Critical reception ==
The New Zealand Herald wrote that "The Nihilist is not the album of hopelessness and negativity the title might suggest, but rather an exploration of the idea that there might be more to it all than what we see and believe." American Songwriter called it "the first album where Finn fully explores using the studio as an instrument, creating a headphones album that doesn’t shy away from the fact that it’s pulling on his skills as a producer as much as his gifts as a songwriter."

== Track listing ==
All songs were written by Liam Finn

1. "Ocean Emmanuelle"
2. "The Nihilist"
3. "Snug As Fuck"
4. "Helena Bonham Carter"
5. "Burn Up the Road"
6. "Dreary Droop"
7. "Miracle Glance"
8. "4 Track Stomper"
9. "Arrow"
10. "I"
11. "Wild Animal"
12. "Wrestle with Dad"

== Personnel ==
- Liam Finn – vocals, all instruments except noted
- Eliza-Jane Barnes – Vocals
- Elroy Finn – Drums
- Jol Mulholland – Bass, synth and vocals.
- Cecilia Herbert – Vocals
- Andrew Keoghan – Violin

=== Production ===
- Engineered by Liam Finn, Chris Boosahda and Jol Mulholland
- Mixed by Liam Finn and Andrew Everding
- Recorded at The Stud, [theend], Tarbox and Roundhead Studios
