= Sinner (Neil Finn song) =

Single by Neil Finn

from the album Try Whistling This
- Released: June 1998
- Songwriter: Neil Finn

Neil Finn singles chronology
"Sinner" (1998)	"She Will Have Her Way" (1998)

"Sinner" is the debut solo single by New Zealand singer/songwriter, Neil Finn, released in 1998.

An acoustic version of the song was performed live and released on Radio Austin 107.1 KGSR's "Broadcasts Vol. 6" album.

== Track listings ==
1. Sinner
2. Astro
3. 808 Song
4. Identical Twin
