= Palo Alto (soundtrack) =

2014 Soundtrack to the 2013 movie Palo Alto

Palo Alto (Music from the Motion Picture) is the soundtrack to the 2013 film Palo Alto directed by Gia Coppola. The album released by Domino Recording Company on June 3, 2014 features tracks from Devonté Hynes and Robert Schwartzman, the film's composers, along with Tonstartssbandht, Mac DeMarco, Nat Wolff and Jack Kilmer. A score album for the film was released on the same day.

== Soundtrack ==
Palo Alto (Music from the Motion Picture)

Soundtrack album by various artists
- Released: June 3, 2014
- Genre: Film soundtrack
- Length: 40:27
- Label: Domino Recording Company
- Producers: Devonté Hynes; Robert Schwartzman

=== Background ===
Coppola was a fan of Dev Hynes, and with her friend who knew him she asked him to send an email so that he could use a song and kept sending more scenes so that he could add more music for the film. He eventually co-composed the score joining with her cousin and musician Robert Schwartzman. Coppola wanted to feel the emotions the children all feel through music. She did not want a soundtrack consisting modern music and current pop hits, but something "timeless" and never feel dated when they look back at the film. Hence, they agreed on her notes and let them take their inspirations as what they felt was right.

Hynes called the soundtrack as dreamiest and most brooding, where he "went deep for the soundtrack" and called the "best thing he had ever done". A music video for the song "You're Not Good Enough" was released on June 9.

=== Track listing ===
No.	Title	Artist(s)	Length
1.	"Palo Alto"	Devonté Hynes	2:44
2.	"Ode to Viceroy"	Mac DeMarco	3:53
3.	"Fútbol Americano"	Robert Schwartzman	1:19
4.	"Champagne Coast"	Blood Orange	4:52
5.	"5Ft7"	Tonstartssbandht	3:25
6.	"Is This Sound Okay?"	Coconut Records	3:07
7.	"Rock Star" (film version)	Nat and Alex Wolff	3:12
8.	"Senza Mamma"	Francesco Pennino	3:25
9.	"Graveyard"	Robert Schwartzman	1:17
10.	"So Bad"	Robert Schwartzman	4:16
11.	"April's Daydream"	Devonté Hynes	1:54
12.	"It's You"	Robert Schwartzman	3:32
13.	"T.M."	Jack Kilmer	1:10
14.	"You're Not Good Enough"	Blood Orange	4:21
Total length:			42:27

=== Reception ===
James Christopher Monger of AllMusic gave 3 stars out of 5 calling it as "a curious collection of druggy, ambient pop that dutifully mimics the permeable pleasures of both summer and youth". Ian Cohen of Pitchfork gave 3.5 out of 10 summarising "you get a couple of lo-fi electro-alt songs featured in grim high school movies, but the soundtrack does not exactly resemble the Folk Implosion". Tom Shone of The Guardian described the soundtrack as "a layering of sweet synth pop" comparing Gia's style of filmmaking being influenced by her aunt Sofia Coppola, and The Boston Globe-critic Ty Burr also complimented the same while highlighting the collection as "moody" and "obscure". Empire and IndieWire ranked it as one among the best soundtracks of 2014.

== Score ==
Palo Alto (Original Motion Picture Score)

Film score by Devonté Hynes and Robert Schwartzman
- Released: June 3, 2014
- Genre: Film score
- Length: 29:09
- Label: Domino Recording Company
- Producers: Devonté Hynes; Robert Schwartzman

Devonté Hynes chronology
Cupid Deluxe (2013)	Palo Alto (2014)	Freetown Sound (2016)

Robert Schwartzman chronology
Pleasure District EP (2013)	Palo Alto (2014)	Washed Away (2016)

=== Background ===
The score consisted a blend of oboes, cellos, saxophones and synthesizers, with Hynes providing vocals for three of the tracks. At the New York University, where Hynes gave a speech on how his songwriting being influenced by synesthesia (a condition that links the senses) where he could associate every sound he hears with a color. In the case of Palo Alto, he thought red as the primary color for the film.

The album was preceded by the first single "April's Bathroom Bummer" released on the same day as the album's release.

=== Track listing ===
No.	Title	Length
1.	"Palo Alto"	2:46
2.	"Soccer Field"	1:34
3.	"Teddy & April"	0:47
4.	"April's Daydream"	1:55
5.	"Run To Graveyard"	0:43
6.	"April's Bathroom Bummer"	2:36
7.	"Emily & Fred, Pt. 1"	0:52
8.	"Emily & Fred, Pt. 2"	1:40
9.	"Teddy Rides Home"	1:47
10.	"Teddy & Fred In the Playground"	1:41
11.	"Teddy In the Library"	2:03
12.	"Big Game"	1:44
13.	"April Bounces"	1:07
14.	"Skateboard Garage"	1:13
15.	"Teddy Loves April"	0:56
16.	"April By the Pool"	0:33
17.	"Fred Drives"	4:35
18.	"Teddy Is Crushed"	0:37
Total length:		29:09

=== Reception ===
Cohen, writing for Pitchfork rated 5.5 out of 10 to the score summarising "Palo Alto may only be useful as background music, but as long as Hynes' star continues to rise, it's hard not to see him potentially getting more work in this vein." Rhian Daly of NME gave three-and-a-half out of five, saying "Palo Alto adds yet another string to Hynes' bow. Despite its sketch-like form, his first foray into film scores shows that his mind is as inquisitive and creative as ever." Sam Moore of Drowned in Sound gave 6 out of 10, calling it as "a pleasant enough collection, one that's presumably made all the more poignant by having actually seen the film. Even then, it's sadly not comparable with the kind of immediately replayable soundtracks that really gave the likes of Submarine or The Social Network that extra edge."
