= She Will Have Her Way (song) =

1998 single by Neil Finn

Single by Neil Finn

from the album Try Whistling This
- B-side: "Tokyo"; "She Comes Scattered"; "Sinner" (Abbey Rd version)
- Released: 1 June 1998
- Length: 3:56
- Label: Parlophone
- Songwriter: Neil Finn
- Producers: Tchad Blake; Marius de Vries

Neil Finn singles chronology
"Sinner" (1998)	"She Will Have Her Way" (1998)	"Last One Standing" (1999)

"She Will Have Her Way" is a song by New Zealand singer-songwriter and Crowded House lead singer Neil Finn. Released on 1 June 1998, the track peaked at number 19 on the New Zealand Singles Chart and number 26 on the UK Singles Chart. The song gave its name to the 2005 tribute album She Will Have Her Way, which features female Australasian artists performing tracks written by Neil and Tim Finn. It was also the inspiration for the title of the 2010 tribute album He Will Have His Way, but the song does not appear on either album.

== Music video ==
The black-and-white music video for this song features a giantess capturing, carrying off and eventually marrying Neil Finn. It is a spoof of the 1958 B-movie Attack of the 50 Foot Woman and the 1959 Lou Costello comedy The 30 Foot Bride of Candy Rock. The video includes clips from both films.

== Track listings ==
Australian CD single

1. "She Will Have Her Way"
2. "Tokyo"
3. "She Comes Scattered"
4. "Sinner" (Abbey Rd version)

UK CD1

1. "She Will Have Her Way"
2. "Astro"
3. "808 Song"

UK CD2

1. "She Will Have Her Way"
2. "Faster Than Light"
3. "Identical Twin"

UK cassette single and European CD single

1. "She Will Have Her Way"
2. "Astro"

== Charts ==
Chart (1998)	Peak position
New Zealand (Recorded Music NZ)	19
Scotland Singles (OCC)	24
UK Singles (OCC)	26

== Release history ==
Region	Date	Format(s)	Label(s)	Ref.
Spain	May 1998	Radio	Parlophone	
United Kingdom	1 June 1998	CD; cassette	Parlophone	
United States	3 November 1998	Contemporary hit radio	Work	
