= SJD (musician) =

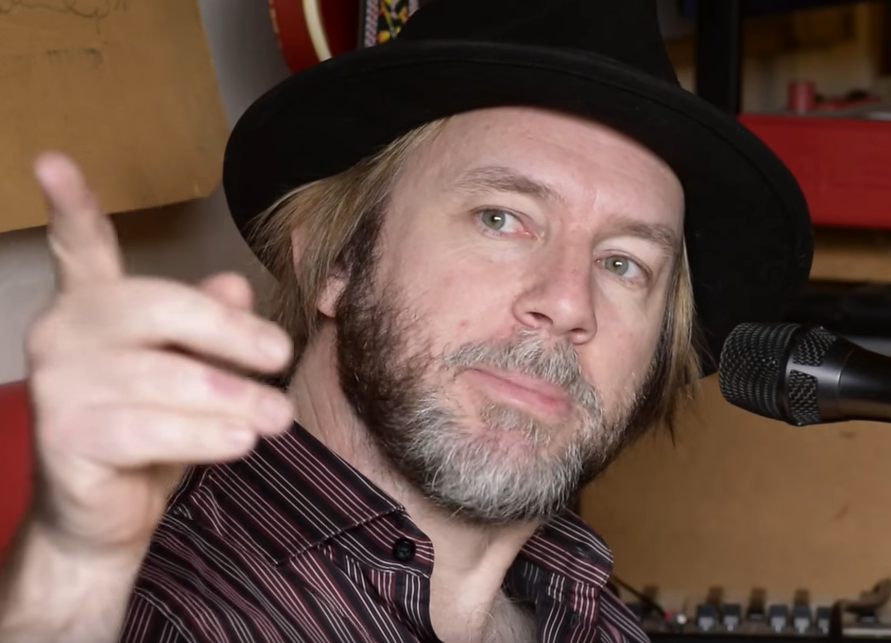
- SJD in 2015

Background information
- Born: Sean James Donnely; 1968 (age 57–58); Auckland, New Zealand
- Genres: Indie; electronic; anti-folk; New Zealand rock
- Occupations: Musician; singer; songwriter
- Instruments: Guitar; synthesizer; drums; keyboards; guitar
- Years active: 1999–present
- Label: Round Trip Mars

SJD, or Sean James Donnelly, is a musician from Auckland, New Zealand. His music is a mix of pop-rock, soul, and electronic music. The name SJD also refers to Donnelly's touring band when not performing solo.

== History ==
Donnelly has cited influences including Orchestral Manoeuvres in the Dark, Gary Numan, the Human League and Soft Cell. SJD's debut album 3 was initially self-released on Swarf Records as 120 CD-Rs in 1999 before being picked up by Flavour Distribution. After contributing a track to the Sideways compilation and playing alongside Phase 5 he then signed to the Round Trip Mars label. Second album Lost Soul Music was released in 2001. Southern Lights was released 2004 with assistance from government arts funding agency Creative New Zealand, yielding the single "Superman You're Crying" which met with some popular success in New Zealand and huge critical acclaim. Sean Donnelly and Angus McNaughton shared the 2005 New Zealand Music Awards Tuis for Best Producer and Best Engineer for their work on Southern Lights. Songs from a Dictaphone was released in July 2007 and followed by Dayglo Spectres, which is a collaborative effort with guitarist and fellow Round Trip Mars artist James Duncan (also in Dimmer), and was released in Oct 2008. His album Elastic Wasteland is entirely written, played, produced and mixed by Sean alone and was released on 16 November 2012.

SJD has collaborated with several other New Zealand musicians, including contributions to Dimmer's successful album You've Got to Hear the Music.

With Don McGlashan and Edmund McWilliams, he co-produced Don McGlashan's 2006 album Warm Hand and wrote "I Will Not Let You Down", which is on the album.

Sean Donnelly formed The Bellbirds in 2009 with Sandy Mill, Victoria Kelly and Don McGlashan. He writes most of their songs.

In 2011, he was part of Neil Finn's Pajama Club project.

In 2012 he produced an all-star cover version of Chris Knox's "Not Given Lightly" for the New Zealand Breast Cancer Foundation.

SJD won the 2013 Taite Music Prize for his album Elastic Wasteland. In 2015, he released the album Saint John Divine, which was a finalist for the 2016 Taite Music Prize.

Donnelly was awarded the Mozart Fellowship at the University of Otago in 2022 and 2023.

== Discography ==
=== Albums ===
| Year | Title | Details | Peak chart positions |
| Year | Title | Details | NZ |
|---|---|---|---|
| 1998 | 3 | Label: Swarf Records | — |
| 2001 | Lost Soul Music | Label: Round Trip Mars; Catalogue: RTM2003 | 50 |
| 2004 | Southern Lights | Label: Round Trip Mars; Catalogue: RTM2006 | 31 |
| 2007 | Songs from a Dictaphone | Label: Round Trip Mars; Catalogue: RTM2010 | 11 |
| 2008 | Dayglo Spectres | Label: Round Trip Mars; Catalogue: RTM2013 | 36 |
| 2012 | Elastic Wasteland | Label: Round Trip Mars/Universal Music New Zealand; Catalogue: RTM2021 | — |
| 2015 | Saint John Divine | Label: Round Trip Mars/Universal Music New Zealand; Catalogue: RTM2022 | 17 |
| 2019 | miniatures 1 | Label: Fried Oyster; Catalogue: | — |
| 2022 | Sweetheart | Label: Round Trip Mars/Universal Music New Zealand; Catalogue: | — |
