= Connan Mockasin =

New Zealand musician (born 1983)

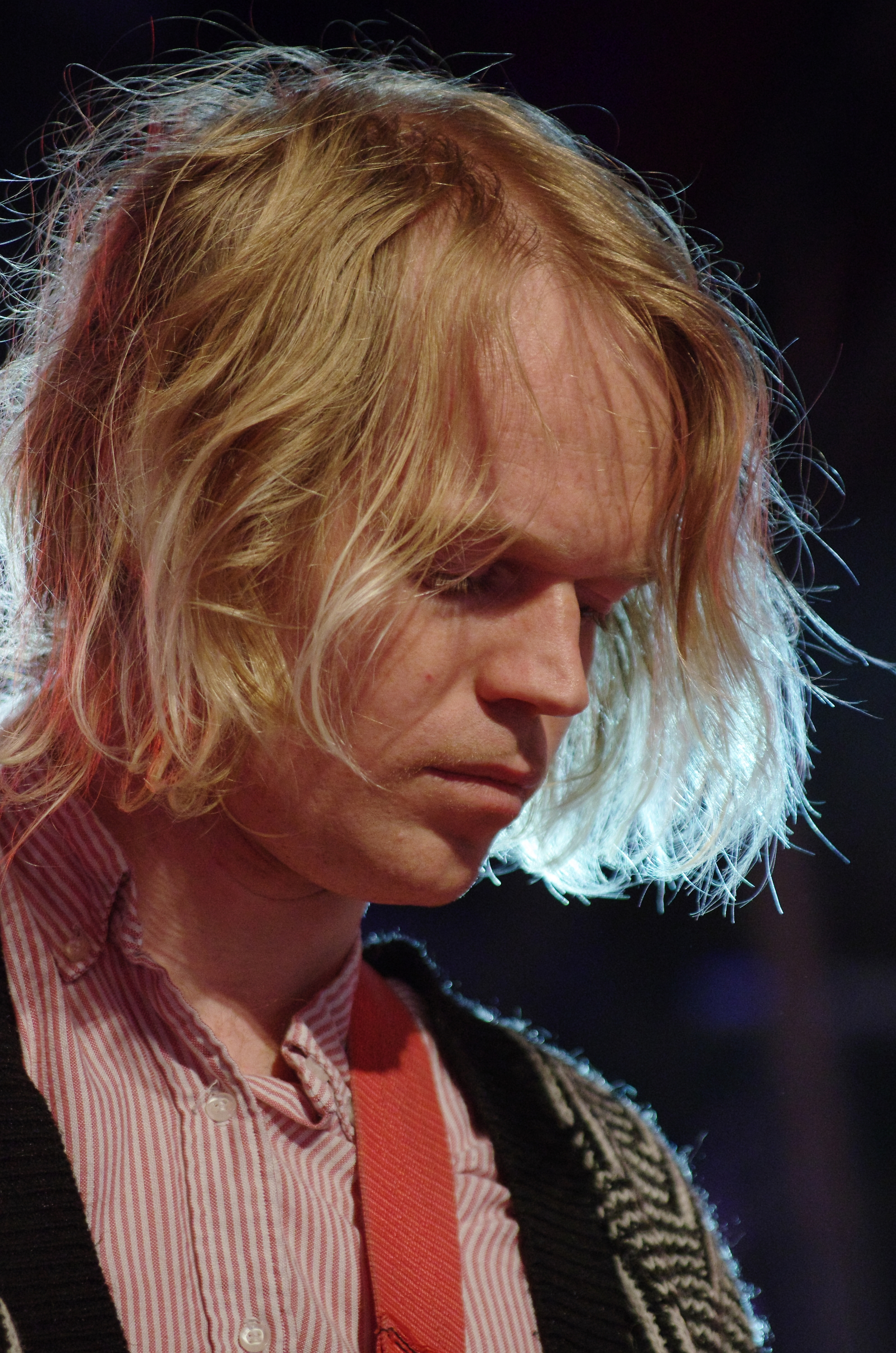
- Mockasin at Haldern Pop Festival, 2013

Background information
- Born: Connan Tant Hosford; 21 March 1983 (age 43); Napier, Hawke's Bay, New Zealand
- Origin: Te Awanga, Hawke's Bay
- Genres: Psychedelic pop; neo-psychedelia; dream pop; space rock; avant-pop; experimental rock; rhythm and blues
- Instruments: Guitar; vocals; bass guitar; saxophone
- Years active: 2003–present
- Labels: Phantasy; Because; Mexican Summer
- Website: Facebook page

Connan Tant Hosford (born in 1983), stage name Connan Mockasin, is a New Zealand singer-songwriter, composer and record producer. Described as "a psych-funk oddball...a contrarian", Mockasin played a role in the contemporary crossover of psychedelia with indie music, and has been praised for his unique approach to songwriting.

Mockasin was born in Napier, Hawke's Bay, and raised in Te Awanga. He gained his moniker from his childhood habit of making mocassin-like shoes out of sheepskin and old motorbike tyres. He moved to Wellington at the age of 20 to further his music career, and played in various bands until the formation of a group called 'Connan and The Mockasins' in 2006. They relocated to the United Kingdom the same year, and Mockasin was pursued by record labels before returning to New Zealand in 2008. He released his debut solo album in 2011, Forever Dolphin Love, to critical acclaim and success particularly in Europe. His second album, Caramel, was released in 2013, and was described by Pitchfork as "stainless world that is both unsettling and fitting". Mockasin has released a string of albums since then, the latest being 2021's Jassbusters Two, the "sequel" to his 2018 album Jassbusters. Additionally, he has scored and produced his own films, such as a visual interpretation of Jassbusters and Bostyn 'n Dobsyn.

Mockasin has also worked with Lawrence Arabia, Liam Finn, Dev Hynes, Mick Fleetwood, and MGMT, as well as his own father on the 2021 album It's Just Wind released through American label Mexican Summer. Those who have cited him as an influence include Beach House, Tyler, the Creator, Nilüfer Yanya, James Blake and Charlotte Gainsbourg. He has lived and worked in London, Lewes, Wellington, Manchester, Los Angeles and Tokyo. He is married to the Japanese model Hiromi Oshima and has one daughter.

== Career ==
=== Early career ===
Mockasin was born in Napier in 1983, and raised in the "dinky wee settlement" of Te Awanga in Hawke's Bay, to father Ade Hosford, a musician formerly of Autumn Stone and Philharmonia Orange. He grew up on a vineyard and had a "lovely" time there, as it featured "lots of nice wines." Mockasin entertained himself as a child by making mocassin-like shoes out of sheepskin and old motorbike tyres, hence his stage name. He started his first band "The Four Skins" (named by his father, Ade "because there are four skins on the drums") while attending Havelock North Intermediate School in 1995.

In 2003, after moving back to Wellington, Mockasin briefly played in a band called The Hornery Stiffmen (later to become a track title on Please Turn Me into the Snat), consisting of Blake Pryor (bass) (who later appeared as an actor in "Bostyn 'n Dobsyn") and Christopher Chalmers (drums), before forming his principal New Zealand group "Connan and the Mockasins". Playing alongside Connan were Ross Walker (upright acoustic bass) and Seamus Ebbs (drums). It was with this band that Connan relocated to London in May 2006 after releasing their second EP "Uuu It's Teasy".

=== Forever Dolphin Love (2010–2012) ===
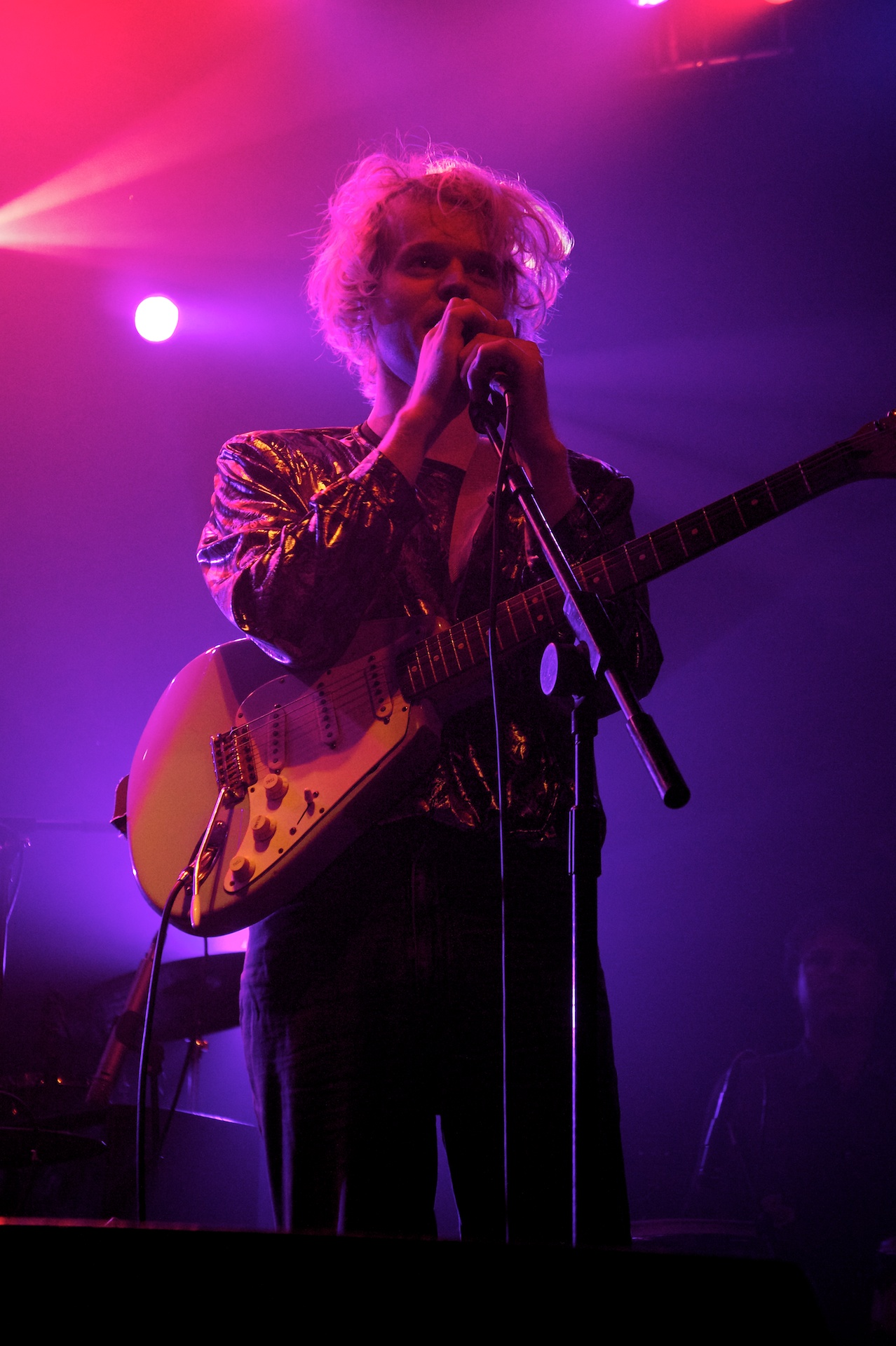
Mockasin supporting Warpaint, Cambridge, Massachusetts, USA, 2011

The first release to bear the name "Connan Mockasin" was the 2010 LP, "Please Turn Me into The Snat", which was re-released as "Forever Dolphin Love" the following year. This album saw a significant change in style to Connan's previous work, and has been described by critics as "fluid", "meandering and blissful", "seemingly effortless" and "mesmerising". In a conversation about why he made the album, Mockasin said "It was never meant to be released...It was just me being silly, really, and Mum forced me to do it." Recording took place in his home in Te Awanga. The re-released 2CD version included a live recording entitled "Forever Dolphin Love", recorded in an apartment in London.

It was at this stage Hosford put together an incarnation of the existing Connan Mockasin live band: Matthew Eccles (drums), Nicholas Harsant (bass), Sam Dust (keyboards) and Rory McCarthy (percussion).

=== Caramel (2013) ===
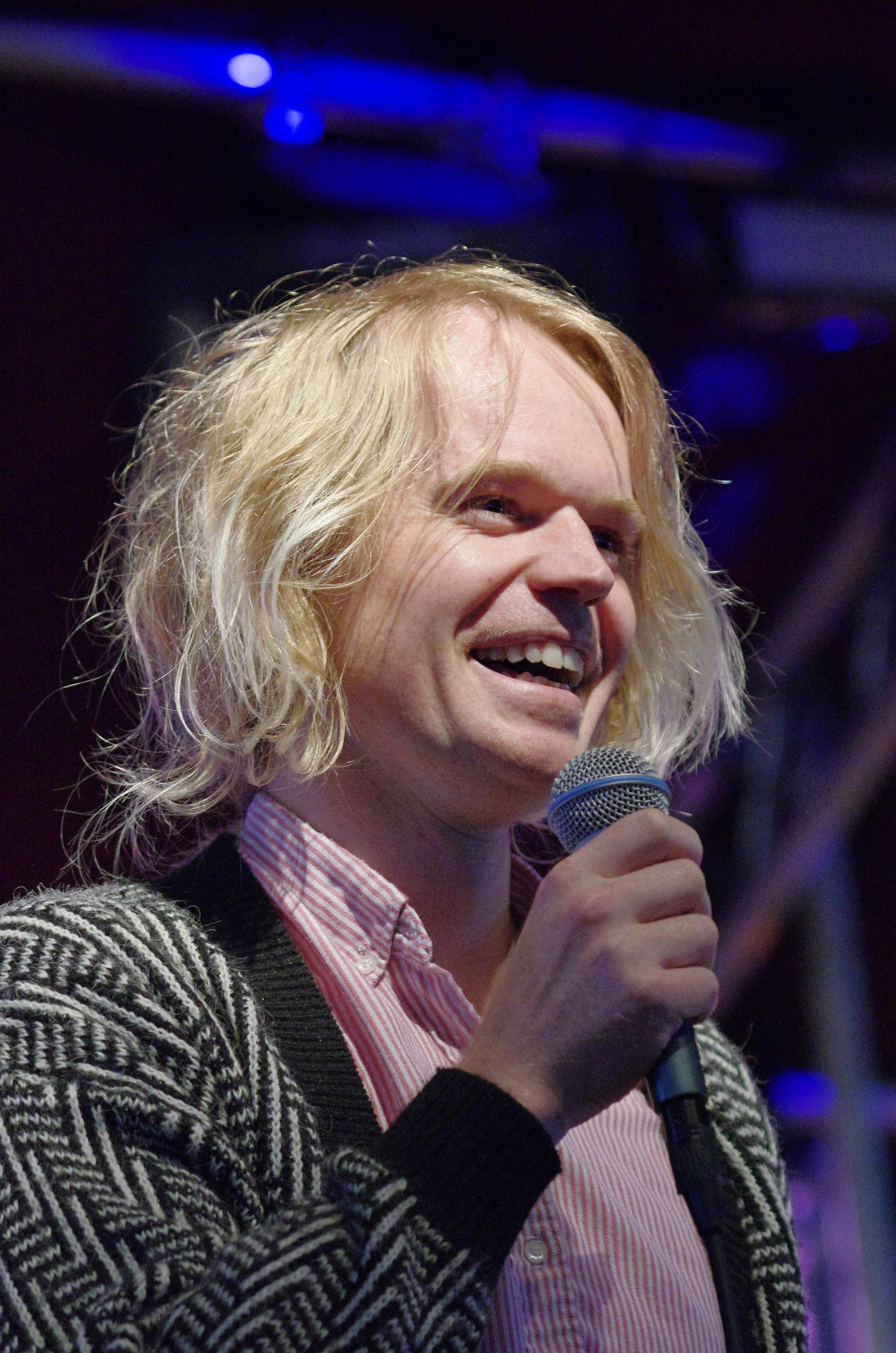
Mockasin in 2013

Mockasin and band toured with Charlotte Gainsbourg as her live band after Mockasin composed the song 'Out of Touch' for her 2011 album Stage Whisper.

Connan Mockasin toured with Radiohead in Australia and New Zealand throughout November 2012, playing sold-out shows in Auckland, Brisbane, Sydney and Melbourne.

Mockasin announced the release of his second album, Caramel in September 2013. It was released the following November. Connan commented, "I wanted to make something simple. Something nice and relaxed. I liked the name, and the album just came up around that. It's what I felt like 'caramel' music would be." The album was recorded in a hotel room in Tokyo: "I know a few people in Japan. We'd have little sleepovers, a bit of fun, a few drinks and stuff. I liked the atmosphere. It was just a hotel room, two beds. It was nice." Critics have said it is an album which "demands patience", and one which leaves you feeling as though "time is being stretched". It featured singles "I'm The Man That Will Find You" and "Do I Make You Feel Shy?".

Regarding the album cover, Mockasin wanted a "simple photo." He admitted that he had a "few different ideas," and he even considered changing the album cover after the initial tour.

=== Jassbusters and Bostyn 'n Dobsyn (2018–2021) ===
On 15 August 2018, new music and tour dates appeared on Connan Mockasin's social media web-pages. "Con Conn Was Impatient" would mark the first release from upcoming album Jassbusters. 19 September saw the release of "Charlotte's Thong" (also taken from Jassbusters) whose namesake is rumoured to be Mockasin-collaborator Charlotte Gainsbourg. Jassbusters was recorded in one week at Studio Ferber, Paris in August 2016, and was the first Connan Mockasin album to feature Mockasin's touring band (Nicholas Harsant, Matthew Eccles, Rory McCarthy).

Jassbusters will accompany a five-part film written and directed by Connan called "Bostyn 'n Dobsyn", which took an alleged 20 years to develop, and reached its current form after a 10-day shoot in Los Angeles in July 2016. The film tells the story of Mr. Bostyn (Connan Tant Hosford), and his student J. Dobsyn (Blake Pryor), and features Connan and band playing as a band of music teachers. The first episode "Belly Bubble" was premiered at the Vista Theatre, Los Angeles before a concert by Jassbusters, followed by a Connan Mockasin performance.

=== Jassbusters Two (2021) ===
In November 2021, Mockasin released a follow-up album, Jassbusters Two, with a press release noting: "Jassbusters Two finds Connan Mockasin once again fronting a fictional band of schoolteachers from the as yet mostly unseen daytime TV miniseries, Bostyn 'n Dobsyn. Recorded at Gary's Electric Studio in Brooklyn, Mockasin, along with Jassbusters' real-life counterparts (Nicholas Harsant on bass, Matthew Eccles on drums, and Rory McCarthy (AKA infinite bisous) on rhythm guitar), freestyled across long live takes, weaving under, over, and straight through each other's blurry riffs."

== Style ==
Mockasin's music is known for its unconventional subject matter, themes, styles and instrumentation; he has been positively labelled as openly "weird", and a pioneer of "trippy, mutated soul". His international success is notable for by far eclipsing his success in his homeland. Artists who have expressed admiration for him include Beck and Radiohead, the latter of whom he toured with in 2012 in a sold-out Australasian tour of Auckland, Brisbane, Sydney and Melbourne. Those who have cited him as an influence include Beach House, Tyler, the Creator, Nilüfer Yanya, James Blake and Charlotte Gainsbourg, the latter two he has since collaborated with. Blake has described Mockasin as a personal friend and mentor, saying "having him around always makes me feel like I could do anything."

== Collaborations ==
After hinting at such a collaboration since 2010, Mockasin's album with Sam Dust (Sam Eastgate of Late of the Pier) "Soft Hair" surfaced in October 2016. The album was made principally in Loughborough, during a period of time when Hosford believed he had contracted H.I.V. When asked why it took so long to release, Connan replied simply, "We had a falling out".

In 2015, Mockasin and British artist Devonté Hynes released the extended play Myths 001: Collaborative Recordings Captured in Marfa, TX March 9–16, 2015 through Mexican Summer, as part of their "Marfa Myths" series.

After having toured the United States extensively with Australian support act Kirin J. Callinan, Mockasin appeared on his November 2015 release "The Teacher", released on Parisian record label Record Makers.

Connan briefly curated concerts under the title "Mockasin's Wet Dream", the first of which took place in London's Moth Club, in collaboration with Charnwood based online music-library Tasty Morsels. The night featured performances by James Blake (who had recently announced Mockasin's involvement on his album 'The Colour in Anything'), Mockasin's father, Ade, Liam Finn and infinite bisous (Rory McCarthy of the Connan Mockasin touring band). The second Wet Dream would take place at Texan festival Marfa Myths, organised by American label Mexican Summer, and would include appearances by Ariel Pink and Andrew Van Wyngarden.

Rejoining BARB bandmates James Milne and Liam Finn, Connan has occasionally played concerts in New Zealand under "Mockasin Arabia Finn". During a concert at Auckland's Crystal Palace, Connan performed a rendition of the Peter Green-era Fleetwood Mac song, "I Need Your Love So Bad", with Mick Fleetwood.

Connan contributed to James Blake's third album, 'The Colour in Anything', playing bass on "Noise Above Our Heads". James has cited Connan as an inspiration, adding "Me actually dancing or moving around onstage, nobody should ever see. But having him around always makes me feel like I could do anything." Connan joined James on stage periodically throughout a tour promoting his new record, singing harmonies. James later featured on "Momo's" from Mockasin's 2018 album Jassbusters.

Mockasin featured on MGMT's 2018 album Little Dark Age and can be seen in the music video for the album's title track.

During the 2018 edition of Marfa Myths, Connan's father Ade joined the band to record a new album, which was entirely improvised. Its rumoured release date is early 2019. The album was eventually released at 14 July 2021 under the title It's Just Wind.

Mockasin featured on Justice's 2024 album Hyperdrama, on the track Explorer.

== Equipment ==
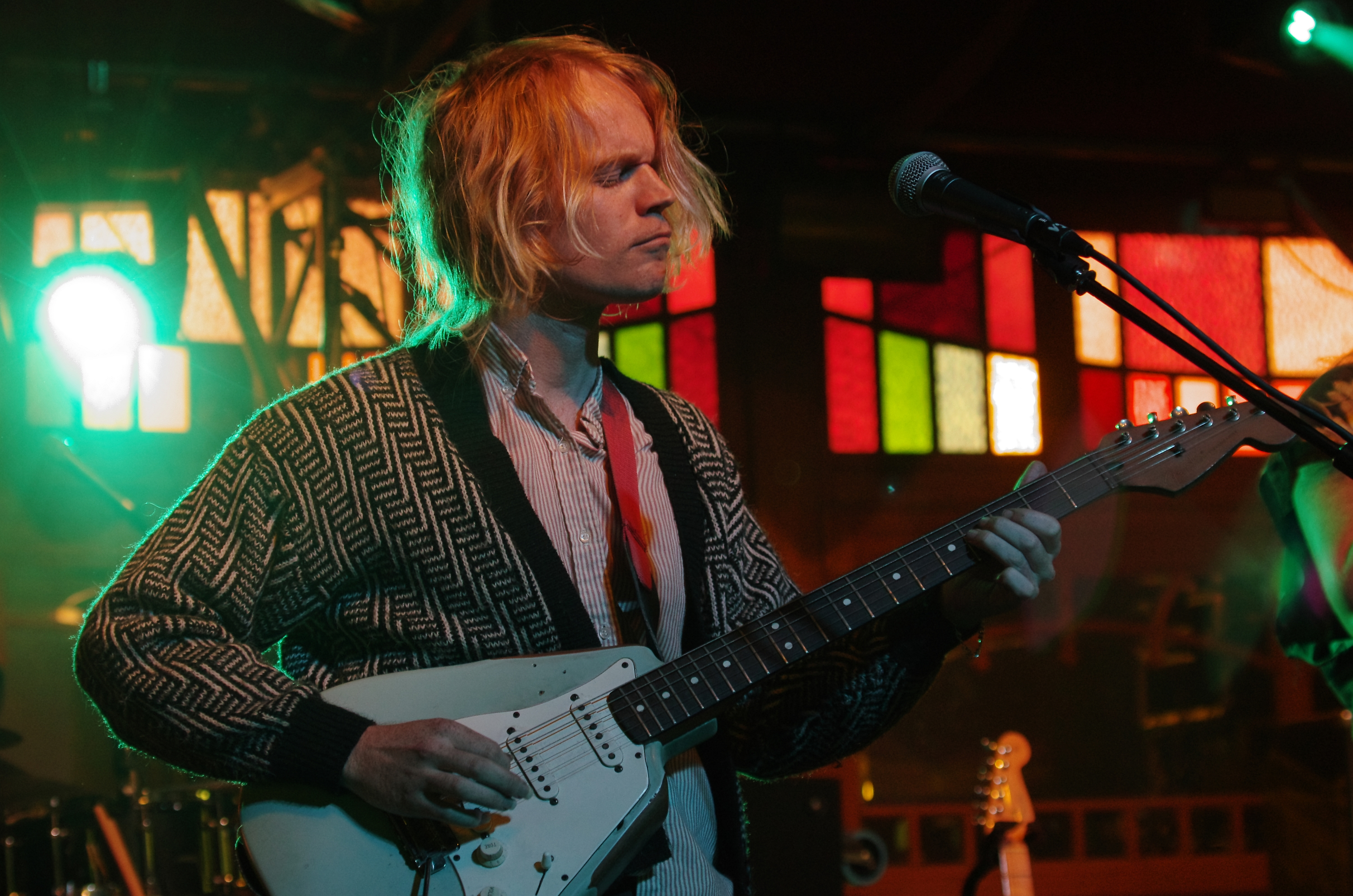
Mockasin playing his customised Fender Stratocaster

Since around 2005, while with 'Connan and the Mockasins', Hosford has played his reshaped Fender Stratocaster, a sky blue 90s Mexican-made model which he hand-sawed (as he would later re-enact with a new Stratocaster on stage in New York at the National Sawdust). Along with his second reshaped Stratocaster, Connan has also recently been playing a black Silvertone 1448., as seen in the video for Connan's version of the Blonde Redhead song "Defeatist Anthem".

Mockasin incorporates a "guitar warble" into much of his music.

== Discography ==
As Connan Mockasin

Title	Details	Peak chart positions		
Title	Details	NZ	FRA	BEL
Please Turn Me into the Snat	Self-released in 2010	39	—	—
Forever Dolphin Love	Released in 2011 by Phantasy and Because Music	—	164	—
Caramel	Released in 2013 by Phantasy, Because Music and Mexican Summer	—	—	195
Jassbusters	Released in 2018 by Mexican Summer	—	—	190
It's Just Wind	Released in 2021 by Mexican Summer	—	—	—
Jassbusters Two	Released in 2021 by Mexican Summer	—	—	—

With Connan and the Mockasins

- Naughty Holidays (2004)
- Uuu It's Teasy (2006)
- Sneaky Sneaky Dogfriend (2006) (EMI, Regal)

With BARB

- Barb (2010)
- "Havin' a Baby"

With Dev Hynes

- Myths 001: Collaborative Recordings Captured in Marfa

With Soft Hair

- Soft Hair (2016)

== Personal life ==
Mockasin is married to Japanese Playboy Playmate model Hiromi Oshima. The couple have one daughter.

=== Association with fashion ===
Mockasin helped Karen Walker launch her first eyewear collection for men called Monumental. The collection featured "bold" and "geometric" glasses with "statement-making frames." Karen Walker wanted to work with Mockasin, because of his "style." Specifically, she cited his "music, his ideas, his concepts," and "his own look" as clear evidence that he does not "run with the pack and run with the trends." Walker asserts that he is a "modern icon," and that he is "actually better than an icon."

Vogue referred to him as "groovy" and "lively."
