= Liam Finn =

New Zealand musician (born 1983)

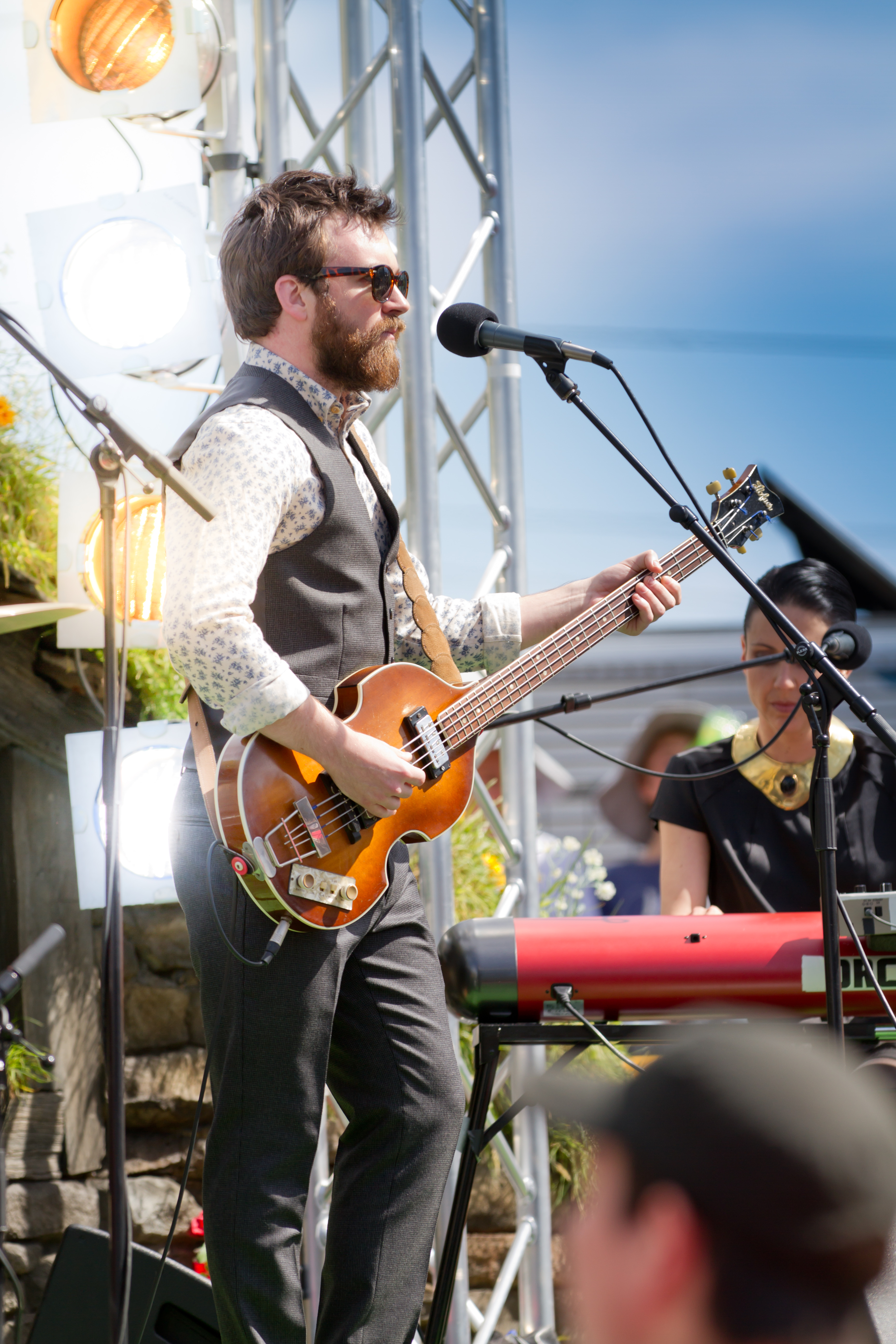
- Finn at the world premiere of The Hobbit: An Unexpected Journey – November 2012 Wellington, New Zealand

Background information
- Born: Liam Mullane Finn; 24 September 1983 (age 43); Melbourne, Victoria, Australia
- Origin: Auckland, New Zealand
- Genres: Indie rock, dream pop
- Occupations: Musician, singer-songwriter
- Instruments: Vocals, guitar, drums, keyboards, bass
- Years active: 2000–present
- Labels: Liberation Music (AUS/NZ); Yep Roc Records (USA); Independent Records (Ireland)
- Member of: Crowded House
- Formerly of: Betchadupa, BARB

Liam Mullane Finn (born 24 September 1983) is a New Zealand singer-songwriter. Born in Melbourne, Australia, he moved to New Zealand as a child. He is the son of musicians Sharon (Johnson) and Neil Finn. In 2020, he joined his father's band, Crowded House.

== Personal life ==
His father, Neil Finn, wrote the song "Our Day" (on the 1983 Split Enz album Conflicting Emotions) about Liam prior to his birth.

Liam Finn married his long-term partner, Janina Percival, in June 2015. They have two sons.

== Career ==
Liam Finn co-founded and performed with the band Betchadupa from 1997 to 2006, who released several albums and EPs between 2000 and 2004.

He has a solo career as a multi-instrumentalist playing drums, keyboards and guitar and singing over loop tracks, composing songs on stage and on live streams.

Liam Finn also records and tours with Crowded House and as of 2024 both he and his brother Elroy Finn are members of the band along with their father Neil Finn, touring the UK, Ireland, Europe, USA, Australia and New Zealand.

=== Live shows ===
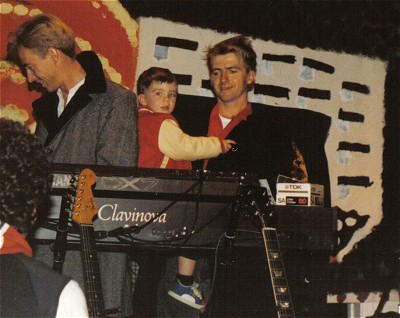
Liam Finn at age 3 with father Neil Finn (and Eddie Rayner at the keyboard) in April 1987 during one of Crowded House's US tours.

In 2008 and 2009 Finn opened for Eddie Vedder's solo tour throughout America. Finn also headlined his first North American tour and headed out on the road with The Black Keys in November 2008 in the UK and Europe. At the Dutch Crossing Border Festival he met Yuri Landman and borrowed a drum guitar, which he used on stage in the Netherlands and Germany. Afterwards Landman invented a new instrument for him, a 24-string electric cymbalum called the Tafelberg, which he incorporated at his stage performances.

Finn played a series of solo concerts in Ireland in April 2008 with guest appearances from vocalist Eliza Jane Barnes, the daughter of Australian musician Jimmy Barnes.

Finn played at the Melbourne Cricket Ground on 14 March 2009 for Sound Relief, a multi-venue rock music concert in support of relief for the Victorian Bushfire Crisis. The event was held simultaneously with a concert at the Sydney Cricket Ground. All the proceeds from the Melbourne Concert will go to the Red Cross Victorian Bushfire relief. Appearing with Finn in Melbourne were Augie March, Bliss n Eso with Paris Wells, Gabriella Cilmi, Hunters & Collectors, Jack Johnson, Kasey Chambers & Shane Nicholson with Troy Cassar-Daley, Kings of Leon, Jet, Midnight Oil, Paul Kelly, Split Enz and Wolfmother.

In August 2009, Finn performed with a new band called BARB on a small New Zealand tour with a band consisting of Connan Hosford (Connan and the Mockasins), James Milne (Lawrence Arabia), Eliza Jane Barnes, Seamus Ebbs, Jol Mulholland and Wild Bill Rickets. Their album (recorded at Roundhead Studios in Auckland) was released 24 August 2010.

In January 2014, Finn toured New Zealand for the first time since 2011, this time with a new backing band The Salty Women, which consisted of mostly past collaborators including James Milne (Lawrence Arabia), Eliza Jane Barnes, and brother Elroy Finn.

=== With Neil Finn and Crowded House ===
On 29 November 2009, Finn and his father also sang together (along with Pearl Jam, Ben Harper and Eliza-Jane Barnes) at Christchurch's AMI Stadium. They sang "Better Be Home Soon" and the Split Enz classic "I Got You".

On 24 August 2018, Finn released the album Lightsleeper with his father.

In 2021 he appeared on Crowded House's album Dreamers Are Waiting as a core member of the band. The album features several songs cowritten by Liam and Neil Finn, and one song ("Goodnight Everyone") that was written by Liam alone.

== Discography ==
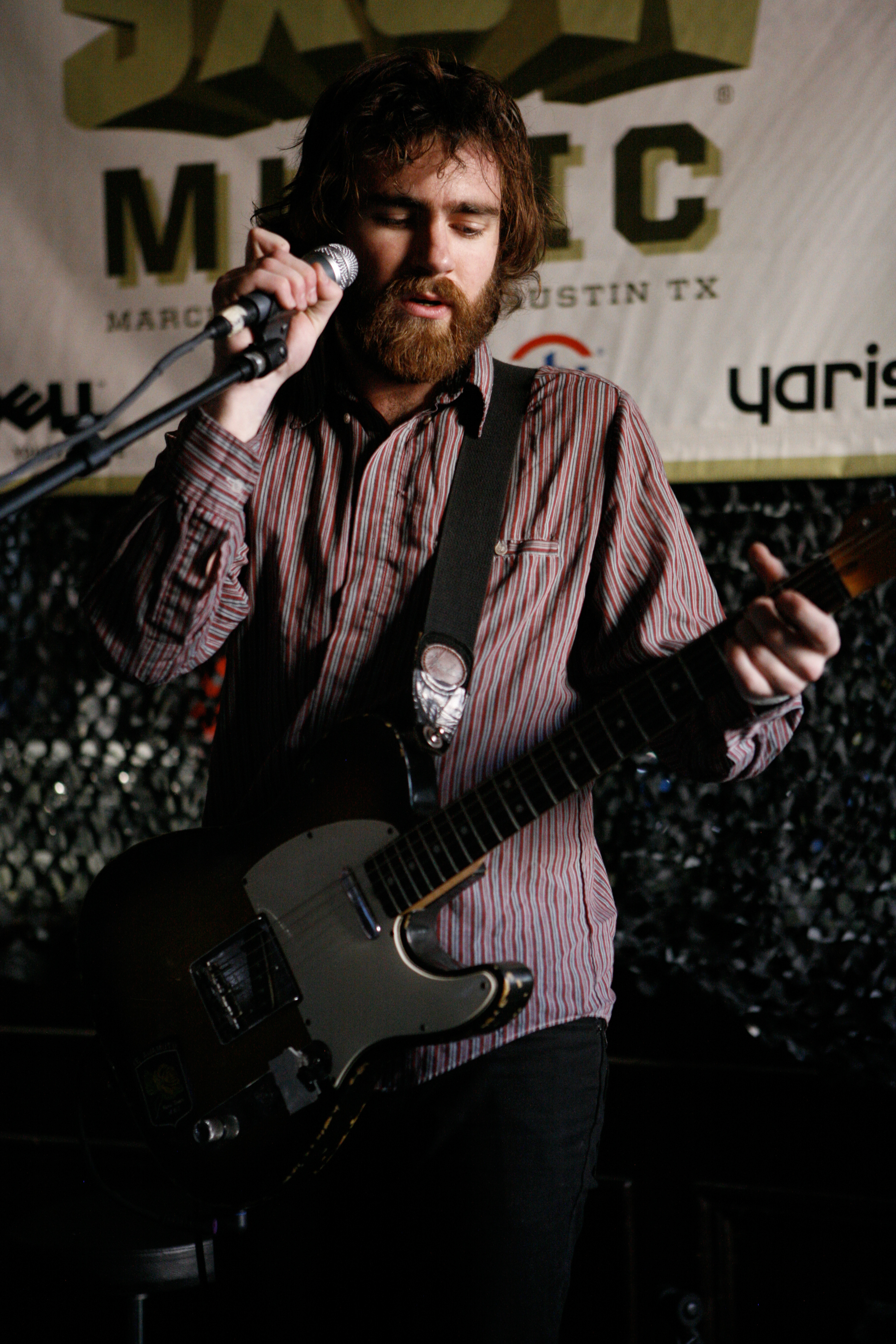
Finn performing in 2008

=== Albums ===
==== Studio albums ====
Year	Title	Details	Peak chart positions			
Year	Title	Details	NZ	AUS	UK	US
2007	I'll Be Lightning	Released: 4 August 2007; Label: Liberation Music; Catalogue: LIBCD92445	7	57	13	46
2011	FOMO	Released: 17 June 2011; Label: Liberation Music; Catalogue: LMCD0144	5	–	26	21
2014	The Nihilist	Released: 4 April 2014; Label: Liberation Music; Catalogue: LMCD0241	8	–	11	9
2025	Hyperverse	Released: 13 June 2025; Label: Occasional Music; Catalogue: LP-SMR-088IE	–	–	–	–
"—" denotes a recording that did not chart or was not released in that territory.

==== Live albums ====
- Live (in Spaceland) – 22 February 2008, Spaceland Recordings
- Live From The Wiltern – (2008) Yep Roc Records

==== EPs ====
- Second Chance (2007)
- Champagne in Seashells (2009)
- Con Man (2024)

=== with Betchadupa ===
- The Alphabetchadupa (2002)
- Aiming For Your Head (2004)

=== with BARB ===
- Barb, (2010)

=== with Neil Finn ===
- Lightsleeper (2018)

=== with Crowded House ===
- Dreamers Are Waiting (2021)
- Gravity Stairs (2024)
