= Neil Finn =

New Zealand musician (born 1958)

Neil Finn OBE
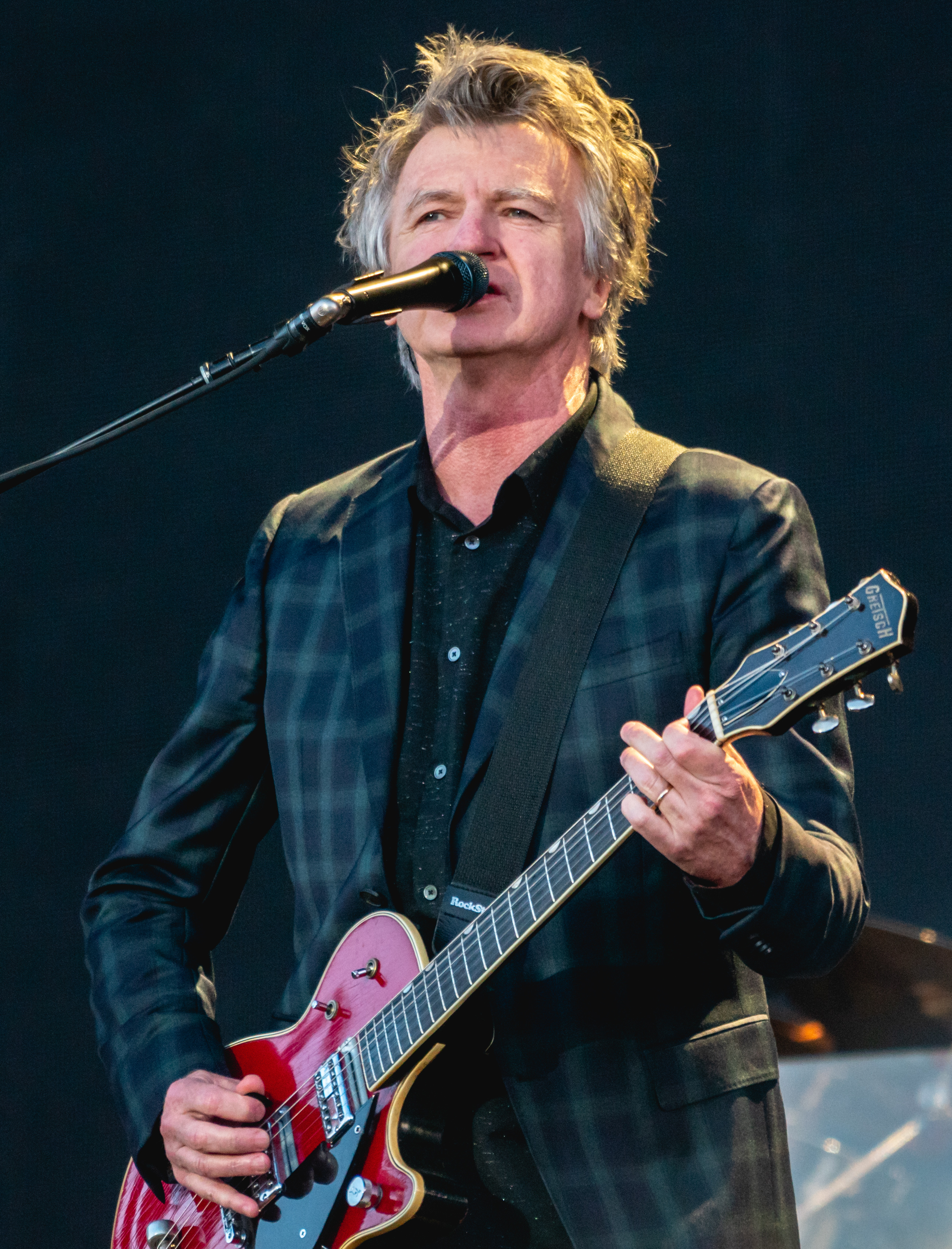
- Finn performing with Fleetwood Mac at Werchter Boutique in 2019

Background information
- Born: 27 May 1958 (age 68); Te Awamutu, Waikato, New Zealand
- Genres: Rock; art rock; new wave; pop
- Occupations: Musician; songwriter
- Instruments: Vocals; guitar; keyboards; percussion
- Years active: 1976–present
- Labels: Columbia; Lester Records, LTD; Kobalt
- Member of: Crowded House; Finn Brothers; Split Enz
- Formerly of: After Hours; The Mullanes; 7 Worlds Collide; Pajama Club; Fleetwood Mac
- Website: www.neilfinn.com

Neil Mullane Finn (born 27 May 1958) is a New Zealand singer-songwriter and musician. He is best known for being a principal member of Split Enz and for being the lead singer of Crowded House. He was also a member of Fleetwood Mac from 2018 until 2022. Ed O'Brien of Radiohead has hailed Finn as popular music's "most prolific writer of great songs".

Finn joined Split Enz in 1977 after the departure of founding member Phil Judd and facilitated the band's shift away from art rock towards new wave pop. Gradually rising in creative prominence within the band, he wrote the majority of the band's hits in the 1980s, including "I Got You", "One Step Ahead", "History Never Repeats", and "Message to My Girl". After Split Enz broke up in 1984, Finn formed Crowded House with Split Enz's final drummer, Paul Hester, and served as the band's lead singer and principal songwriter. Crowded House achieved international success in 1987 when they released the single "Don't Dream It's Over", written by Finn.

Crowded House disbanded in 1996. Finn and his brother released two albums as the Finn Brothers before Finn re-formed Crowded House in 2006. In April 2018, Finn joined Fleetwood Mac for their tour that year and was a member of the band until they disbanded in 2022. Finn has also recorded several successful solo albums, assembled diverse musicians for the 7 Worlds Collide project, and contributed to several film and television soundtracks.

== Early life ==
Neil Mullane Finn was born on 27 May 1958, the youngest of four children, to Dick and Mary Finn in Te Awamutu, New Zealand. His mother, a devout Roman Catholic who moved to New Zealand from Ireland at the age of two, maintained a religious influence over the family. Speaking of Catholicism, Finn stated "It's a great fertile ground for pulling lyrics out. [There's] lots of good stuff going on in there, good rituals and imagery and lots of guilt. It's a very potent combination. I think you're blessed, really, to be brought up with some kind of weird dogma like that." His father, the son of a farmer from Waikato, served in the army in Italy and became an accountant during World War II. His parents instilled an "inspiring admiration of music" in young Finn; the family would often engage in sing-alongs around the family piano. In addition to music, Finn also enjoyed sports, particularly swimming, rugby, tennis, and biking.

As a child, Finn would often perform at family gatherings with his older brother, Tim. Finn recalled, "We'd sing all night. It was very much part of our upbringing.... That was the first inkling of the seduction of live performance." He idolised his brother and wished to imitate his actions, learning to play guitar and piano at the same time Tim did. Tim was more public about his musical aspirations, and won ten shillings in the annual talent contest at his school shortly after enrolling. When Tim left home to study at Sacred Heart College, a boarding school in Auckland, eight-year-old Neil started playing a guitar that his older brother left behind. A natural performer, Finn was nicknamed 'The Ant' by his family due to his determined and ambitious nature.

Finn attended Sacred Heart boarding school in Auckland and Te Awamutu College in Te Awamutu, Waikato. He decided to become a musician at the age of 12 and throughout his school years performed in hospitals and prisons, as well as at home gatherings.

== Career ==
=== 1977–1984: Split Enz ===
In 1976, Finn formed the group After Hours, with Mark Hough, Geoff Chunn, and Alan Brown. Not long after the band's debut performance, Finn's brother Tim invited him to join Split Enz in London, replacing original singer-songwriter Phil Judd. By 1980, he was sharing lead singer duties and wrote their first international hit, "I Got You". Finn contributed significantly to the band's later albums, and even briefly assumed leadership in the band's final days when Tim Finn left in 1984.

=== 1985–1996: Crowded House ===
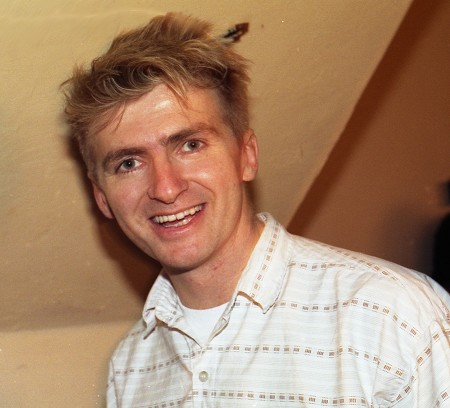
Finn during Crowded House's heyday, San Francisco, 1987

After the break-up of Split Enz in 1984, Finn formed a new band called The Mullanes (Mullane being both his middle name and his mother's maiden name) with Split Enz drummer Paul Hester, guitarist Craig Hooper (of The Reels), and bassist Nick Seymour (younger brother of Hunters & Collectors leader Mark Seymour) who Finn met on the final Split Enz tour. Hooper left just before they recorded their first album, at which time the band was renamed Crowded House, inspired by the rental home they shared while recording in Los Angeles.

Crowded House went on to enjoy worldwide acclaim; particularly, with its two major hits "Don't Dream It's Over" (1987: US No. 2; Canada and New Zealand No. 1) and "Weather With You" (1992: UK No. 7). Both Neil and his brother Tim were appointed as Officers of the Order of the British Empire (OBE) for services to music in the 1993 Queen's Birthday Honours.. After releasing four albums—Crowded House, Temple of Low Men, Woodface, and Together-Alone, the group broke up in 1996 and soon after released their greatest hits album Recurring Dream.

Their debut self-titled album was released in June 1986, with the first two singles failing to gain much attention before "Don't Dream It's Over" became an international hit. Their second album Temple of Low Men followed in 1988. Tim Finn joined Crowded House to help record Woodface, released in July 1991, which became the band's most recognized album, featuring singles including "Chocolate Cake", "Fall at Your Feet", "Weather With You" and "Four Seasons in One Day". Together Alone was released in October 1993 and featured Mark Hart. Paul Hester quit the band in 1994 during an American tour, citing his discomfort with extensive travel and a desire to spend more time at home. The band performed a farewell concert at the Sydney Opera House on November 24, 1996.

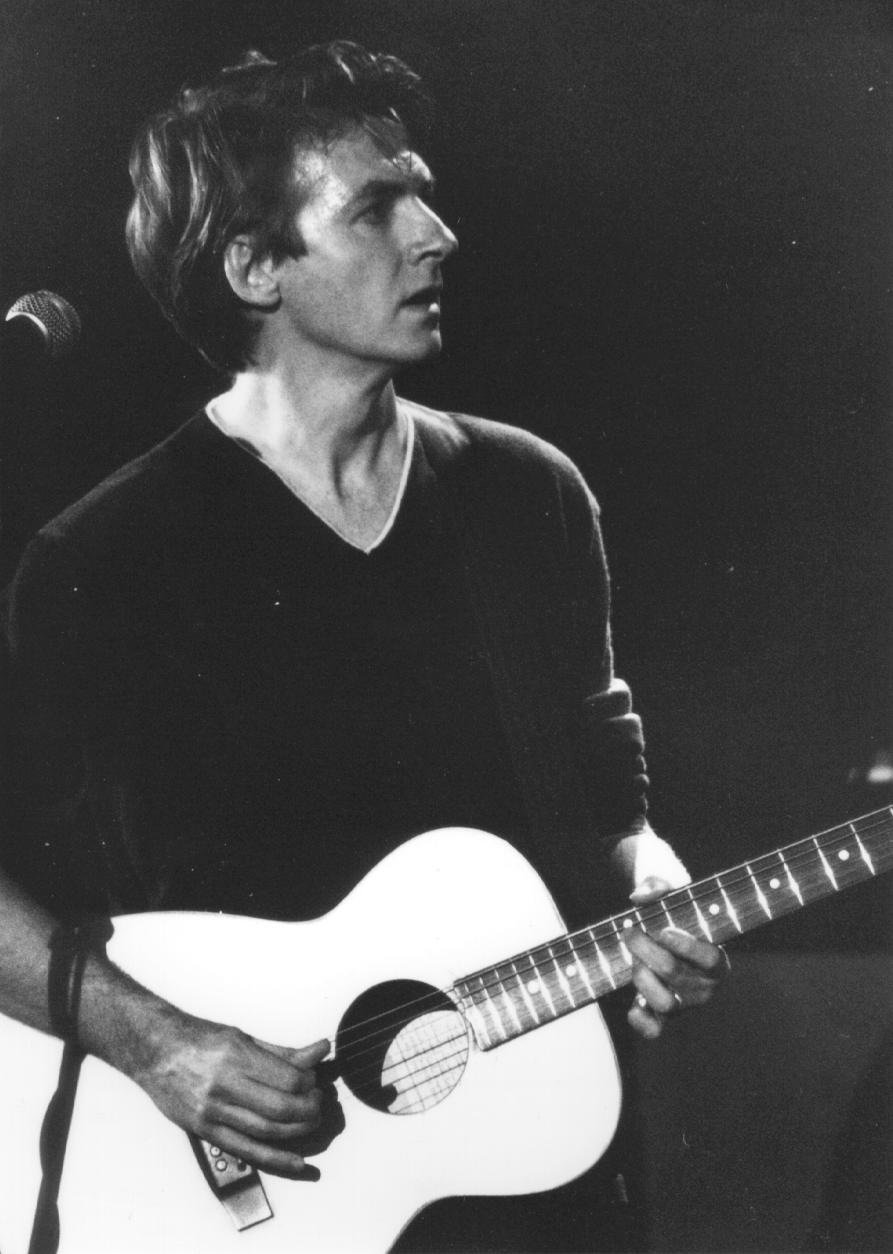
Finn in 1996

=== 1997–2006: Solo work ===
Following the break-up of Crowded House, Finn embarked on a solo career. The album Afterglow was released in 1999, which contained previously unreleased Crowded House recordings. Finn appeared as part of the BBC Four's Songwriters' Circle series in 1999, and explained that "Don't Dream It's Over" and "Better Be Home Soon" were both written quickly, with all of the elements of each song—such as lyrics and verses—emerging at the same time. Finn also sang the opening lines of The Verve song "The Drugs Don't Work" to the opening chords of the latter song. Finn penned a theme song for the All Blacks' participation in the 1999 Rugby World Cup, "Can You Hear Us?", that made it to the top of the New Zealand charts in October.

Finn has recorded four solo albums, Try Whistling This (1998), One Nil (2001), Dizzy Heights (2014), and Out of Silence (2017). One Nil was released in the US and Canada in a remixed version with two new tracks, one track deleted and reordered, and was renamed One All (2002). Neil and Tim Finn also collaborated on a Finn Brothers album, Finn, that was released in 1995.

In 2001, Finn released a live album/DVD (7 Worlds Collide) consisting of songs recorded at St James Theatre in Auckland with several other artists. Finn was also heavily involved in creating the 2001 soundtrack for the motion picture Rain. Everyone Is Here, a second Finn Brothers album, was released in 2004.

=== 2006–present: Reformation of Crowded House, family collaborations and Fleetwood Mac ===
In January 2007, Crowded House reformed with Finn, Nick Seymour, Mark Hart, and new drummer Matt Sherrod, as Paul Hester had died in 2005. The group's new album Time on Earth was released in June 2007. In the pre-release build up, they headlined a show at Coachella in April 2007. The band then commenced a world tour.

Finn appeared on fellow musician Missy Higgins' CD, On a Clear Night (2007).

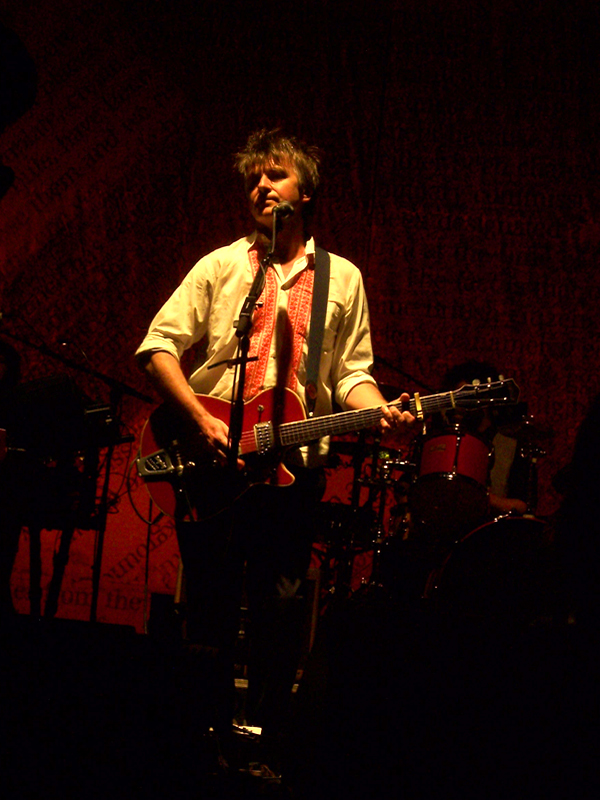
Finn playing at Calvin Theatre, August 2007

Finn and his wife Sharon began a side project called Pajama Club in 2011. After Finn's children left the family home to pursue their own musical careers, the two wondered what to do to fill the time left open by their children's absence. The two decided to repair the music room in their Auckland home and begin making music of their own: "We've had a bit more time on our hands since the boys left home, and we just decided to make a record. It was as simple as that. We called the group Pajama Club, because we were dressed in our pyjamas when we started." Sharon began to play the bass guitar and Neil sat behind the drum set, despite the fact that neither had played either instrument before.

On 23 October 2011, Finn performed with Ryan Adams and Janis Ian on BBC Four's Series 2 Episode 4 of the series, Songwriters' Circle. The night resulted in controversy, ending with an awkward exchange between the performers when there seemingly was confusion between them about who was to perform and join in on each other's songs.

During February and March 2013, Finn and Paul Kelly undertook their collaborative Goin' Your Way Tour of Australia. One of their performances at the Sydney Opera House was recorded for the live album, Goin' Your Way (8 November 2013). It was issued as a double CD, which peaked at No. 5 on the ARIA Albums Chart. It was also issued as a DVD, which peaked at No. 1 on the ARIA Music DVD Chart.

Finn's solo album, Dizzy Heights, was released in Australia and New Zealand on 7 February 2014 via Kobalt Label Services. His sons and his wife also play on the album. Dizzy Heights is his third solo album.

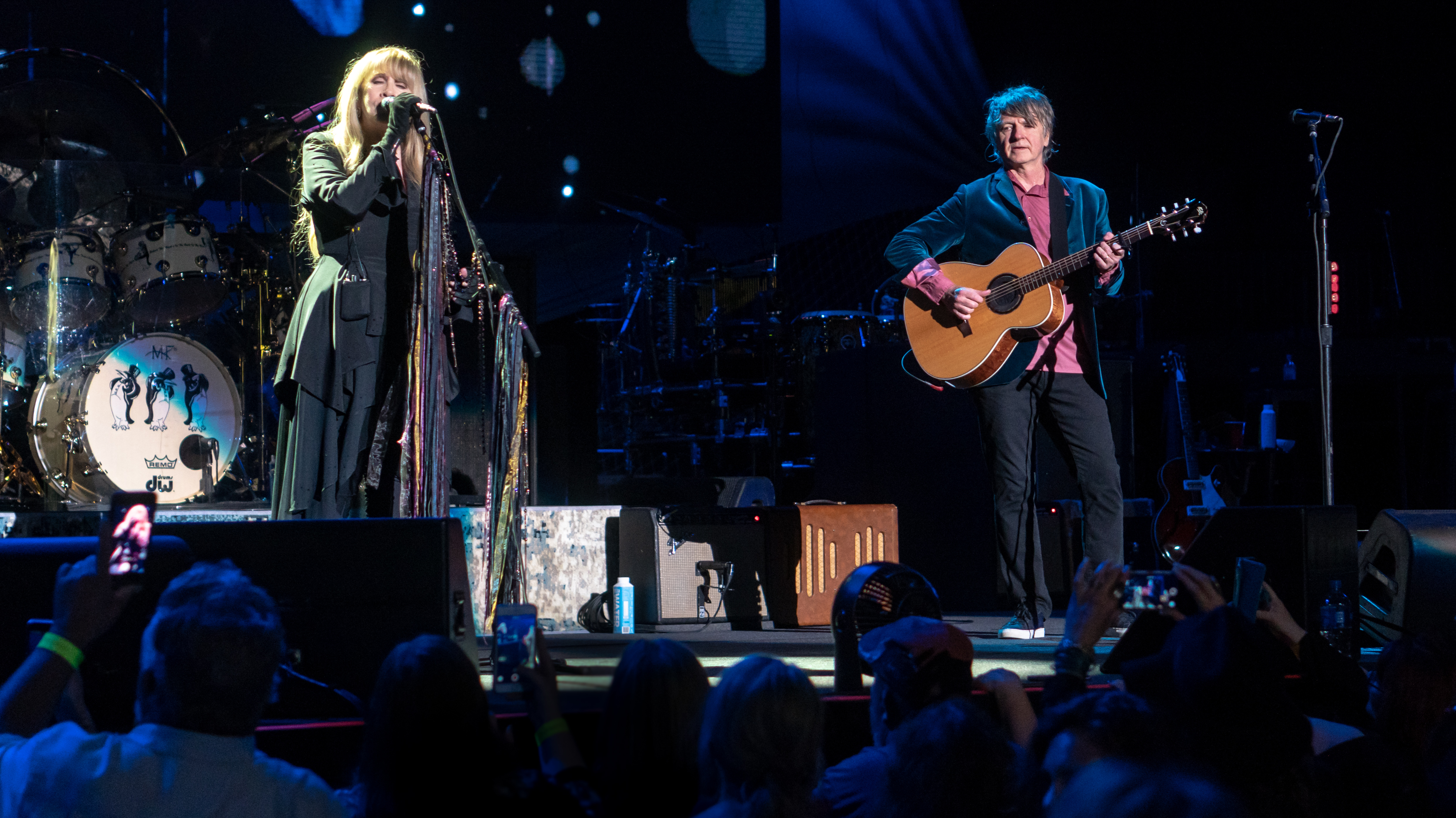
Finn and Stevie Nicks performing in Fleetwood Mac, 2018

On 15 April 2018, Fleetwood Mac announced that Finn had joined the band along with Heartbreakers' lead guitarist Mike Campbell. In 2018, Finn joined Fleetwood Mac as a touring member following the departure of Lindsey Buckingham and performed with the band on their 2018-2019 world tour, contributing guitar, keyboards and vocals.

In August 2018, Finn released the album Lightsleeper as a collaboration with his son Liam.

=== Charity work ===
In 1986, Finn performed with The Rock Party, a charity project initiated by the National Campaign Against Drug Abuse (NCADA) that included many Australasian musicians such as Reg Mombassa from Mental As Anything, Tim Finn, and Nick Seymour and Paul Hester of Crowded House. The Rock Party released a 12" single entitled "Everything To Live For".

In December 2008, several of the 7 Worlds Collide line-up reconvened in Auckland, New Zealand to record The Sun Came Out, a charity album for Oxfam.

In March 2009, Neil Finn, with his son Liam, joined Tim Finn on stage at Melbourne's charity Sound Relief concert at the Melbourne Cricket Ground, in support of the 2009 Victorian bushfires. Liam Finn played drums on a rendition of the Crowded House song "Weather With You".

=== Film and television ===
Finn has contributed solo music to various film and TV soundtracks including Rain, Boston Legal, Boston Public, The Waiting Game, Antz, and Sports Night. In 2012, Finn recorded the song "Song of the Lonely Mountain", which was featured in the end credits of Peter Jackson's film adaptation The Hobbit: An Unexpected Journey.

Finn had a cameo acting role on the BBC Radio series Flight of the Conchords.

In 2023, Finn provided a voice cameo for the Australian children's TV series Bluey in the third season.

== Personal life ==
Finn married Sharon Dawn Johnson in February 1982. Finn and his wife have two sons, Liam and Elroy Finn.

== Solo discography ==
This discography relates to solo releases by Neil Finn only. See Split Enz discography, Crowded House discography and The Finn Brothers' discography for other related works.

=== Albums ===
| Title | Details | Peak chart positions | | | | | | Certification |
| Title | Details | NZ | AUS | UK | NOR | NLD | US Heat | Certification |
|---|---|---|---|---|---|---|---|---|
| Try Whistling This | Released: 16 June 1998; Label: Parlophone (72434 95139 2 1) | 1 | 1 | 5 | 18 | 88 | 19 | ARIA: Platinum |
| Sessions at West 54th | Part of the US television series Sessions at West 54th.; Released: 19 December 2000; Label: Sony BMG | — | — | — | — | — | — | |
| One Nil | Released with the title One All in the United States in 2002.; Released: 19 March 2001; Label: Parlophone (7243 5 32112 2 6) | 1 | 9 | 14 | — | — | 26 | ARIA: Gold |
| 7 Worlds Collide | Released: 26 February 2002; Label: Parlophone (5366452) | 5 | — | 140 | — | — | 45 | |
| The Sun Came Out | Released: 31 August 2009; Label: Sony (88697583451) | 2 | 39 | 58 | — | — | — | |
| Goin' Your Way | With Paul Kelly; Released: 8 November 2013; Label: EMI (3758245) | — | 5 | — | — | — | — | ARIA: Gold |
| Dizzy Heights | Released: 7 February 2014; Label: Lester, Kobalt | 5 | 6 | 22 | — | 53 | — | |
| Out of Silence | Released: 1 September 2017; Label: Lester | 10 | 9 | 71 | — | — | — | |
| Lightsleeper (with Liam Finn) | Released: 24 August 2018; Label: Inertia, PIAS | 8 | 21 | 83 | — | — | — | |
"—" denotes a recording that did not chart or was not released in that territory.

=== Live albums ===
| Title | Album details |
|---|---|
| Solo at the Seymour Centre, 2010 | Released: 1 October 2019; Format: CD (limited), DD, streaming; Label: Neil Finn, Black Box Records/ MGM Distribution |

=== Singles ===
| Title | Year | Peak chart positions | | | | Album |
| Title | Year | NZ | AUS | UK | US AAA | Album |
|---|---|---|---|---|---|---|
| "Dots on the Shells" (Yothu Yindi with Neil Finn) | 1994 | — | — | — | — | Freedom |
| "Message to My Girl" (ENZSO with Neil Finn) | 1996 | — | 56 | — | — | ENZSO |
| "Sinner" | 1998 | — | 40 | 39 | 12 | Try Whistling This |
| "She Will Have Her Way" | 1998 | 19 | 61 | 26 | — | Try Whistling This |
| "Last One Standing" | 1999 | — | — | — | — | Try Whistling This |
| "I Can See Clearly Now" | 1999 | 16 | 88 | — | — | Non-album single |
| "Can You Hear Us" | 1999 | 1 | — | — | — | Non-album single |
| "Rest of the Day Off" | 2001 | 29 | 77 | — | — | One Nil |
| "Wherever You Are" | 2001 | — | — | 32 | — | One Nil |
| "Last to Know" | 2001 | — | — | — | — | One Nil |
| "Hole in the Ice" | 2001 | — | — | 43 | — | One Nil |
| "There Is a Light That Never Goes Out" | 2001 | — | — | — | — | 7 Worlds Collide |
| "Driving Me Mad" | 2002 | — | — | — | 17 | One All |
| "Dizzy Heights" | 2014 | — | — | — | — | Dizzy Heights |
| "Flying in the Face of Love" | 2014 | — | — | — | — | Dizzy Heights |
| "More Than One of You" | 2017 | — | — | — | — | Out of Silence |
| "Second Nature" | 2017 | — | — | — | — | Out of Silence |
| "Find Your Way Back Home" (with Stevie Nicks & Christine McVie) | 2020 | — | — | — | — | Non-album single |
"—" denotes a recording that did not chart or was not released in that territory.

=== Other contributions ===
==== As performer ====
- Diana, Princess of Wales: Tribute (1997) – "Don't Dream It's Over (acoustic)"
- Antz soundtrack (1998) – "I Can See Clearly Now"
- Andrew Denton Musical Challenge (2000) – "Billie Jean"
- Andrew Denton's Musical Challenge Volume 2: Even More Challenged (2001) – "Sexual Healing"
- Through Space To Your Place (2001) – "Norwegian Wood"
- Live at the World Café: Vol. 15 - Handcrafted (2002, World Café) – "Driving Me Mad"
- 107.1 KGSR Radio Austin – Broadcasts Vol.10 (2002) – "Private Universe"
- Maybe This Christmas (2002) – "Sweet Secret Peace"
- The Hobbit: An Unexpected Journey (2012) – "Song of the Lonely Mountain"
- Neil Hamburger Presents Seasonal Depression Suite (2023) – "Here Comes The Season Again"

==== As producer ====
- "No Commotion" (1983, single) – Karen Ansel
- Greenstone (1994, album) – Emma Paki
- Twist (1994, album) – Dave Dobbyn
- Nature (1995, album) – The Mutton Birds
- Moana and The Moahunters (1998, album) – Moana and the Moahunters
- Brand New (1999, album) (as executive producer) – The Stereo Bus
- Soul Lost Companion (1999, album) – Mark Lizotte

==== As session musician ====
- Just Drove Thru Town (1979, album) – Citizen Band
- Sing (1984, album) – Big Choir
- "Everything To Live For" (1986, maxi-single) – The Rock Party
- Rikki & Pete (1988, soundtrack)

Both Finn brothers appeared as session vocalists on Phil Manzanera's 1978 album K-Scope.

== Awards and nominations ==
=== APRA Awards ===
- 2002 Silver Scroll Award: "Turn and Run"
- Most Performed Work Overseas (1994): Neil Finn & Tim Finn, "Weather With You" (with Crowded House)
- Most Performed Work Overseas (1995, 2000–1, 2003 – present): Neil Finn, "Don't Dream It's Over" (with Crowded House)

=== Countdown Australian Music Awards ===
Countdown was an Australian pop music TV series on national broadcaster ABC-TV from 1974 to 1987, it presented music awards from 1979 to 1987, initially in conjunction with magazine TV Week. The TV Week / Countdown Awards were a combination of popular-voted and peer-voted awards.

| Year | Nominee / work | Award | Result |
|---|---|---|---|
| 1980 | himself – Split Enz | Best Recorded Song Writer | Nominated |
| 1981 | himself | Most Popular Male Performer | Nominated |
| 1984 | himself | Best Songwriter | Nominated |
| 1986 | himself | Best Songwriter | Won |

=== Helpmann Awards ===
The Helpmann Awards is an awards show, celebrating live entertainment and performing arts in Australia, presented by industry group Live Performance Australia since 2001.

| Year | Nominee / work | Award | Result | Ref. |
|---|---|---|---|---|
| 2013 | Neil Finn and Paul Kelly | Best Australian Contemporary Concert | Won | |

=== RIANZ New Zealand Music Awards ===
The New Zealand Music Awards are awarded annually by the RIANZ in New Zealand.

| Year | Award | Work | With | Result |
|---|---|---|---|---|
| 1984 | International Achievement | | Split Enz | Nominated |
| 1987 | International Achievement | | Neil Finn | Won |
| 1988 | International Achievement | | Neil Finn | Won |
| 1992 | Best Songwriter | "Fall at Your Feet" | Neil Finn, Crowded House | Won |
| 1992 | Best Songwriter | "It's Only Natural" | with Tim Finn, Crowded House | Nominated |
| 1994 | International Achievement | | Crowded House | Won |
| 1995 | Best Producer | "Twist" | | Nominated |
| 1995 | Best Producer | "Greenstone" | | Nominated |
| 1995 | Best Songwriter | "Private Universe" | | Won |
| 1995 | International Achievement | | Crowded House | Won |
| 1996 | Album of the Year | Finn | Finn Brothers | Nominated |
| 1996 | Best Group | | Finn Brothers | Nominated |
| 1996 | International Achievement: | | Finn Brothers | Nominated |
| 1996 | Best Cover | Finn | Neil Finn and Wayne Conway | Nominated |
| 1997 | International Achievement | | Crowded House | Nominated |
| 1999 | Album of the Year | Try Whistling This | solo | Nominated |
| 1999 | Top Male Vocalist | | solo | Won |
| 1999 | International Achievement: | | solo | Nominated |
| 1999 | Best Songwriter | "She Will Have Her Way" | solo | Nominated |
| 2002 | Album of the Year | One Nil | solo | Nominated |
| 2002 | Top Male Vocalist | One Nil | solo | Won |
| 2005 | Album of the Year | Everyone Is Here | Finn Brothers | Nominated |
| 2005 | Single of the Year | "Won't Give In" | Finn Brothers | Nominated |
| 2005 | International Achievement Award | Everyone Is Here | Finn Brothers | Won |
