= Shanti (EP) =

2017 debut EP by Raveena

EP by Raveena
- Released: December 6, 2017
- Genres: R&B; neo soul
- Length: 15:26
- Label: Self-released
- Producer: Everett Orr

Raveena chronology
| Shanti (2017) | Lucid (2019) |

Shanti is the debut extended play (EP) by American singer-songwriter Raveena, released independently on December 6, 2017. The EP was produced and mixed by Everett Orr, with lyrics written by Raveena.

== Background ==
The EP takes its name from the Hindi word for peace, an homage to Raveena's Indian American roots. Across the project, she paired warm R&B production with nature imagery and dreamy vocals to explore themes of self-love and healing, with a particular focus on centering women of color.

The lead single "If Only" premiered through The Fader in November 2017. Raveena said she wrote the song's lyrics after leaving a toxic relationship, and later developed the track with Orr, describing it as being about recognizing her own strength as a woman and moving on from unsupportive people.

== Release and reception ==
Following the EP's release, NPR featured the bonus track "Wherever U Go" in its Songs We Love series in January 2018, praising the interplay between Raveena's airy vocals and Orr's Motown-influenced production, and noting that her 1990s-inspired catalogue had drawn comparisons to Sade. Raveena said the song was about giving up the need for control and allowing time to escape from routine.

Spin later described the EP as bubbly, warm R&B, and the project helped Raveena build a substantial online following ahead of her debut studio album, Lucid (2019).

== Track listing ==
All lyrics are written by Raveena; all music is composed by Everett Orr.

Shanti track listing
| No. | Title | Length |
|---|---|---|
| 1. | "If Only" | 3:22 |
| 2. | "Love Child" | 2:44 |
| 3. | "No Better" | 4:03 |
| 4. | "Natural" | 5:21 |
| Total length: | | 15:26 |

== Personnel ==
- Raveena – vocals, lyrics
- Everett Orr – production, mixing
