= Raveena Aurora =

American singer-songwriter (born 1993)

Raveena
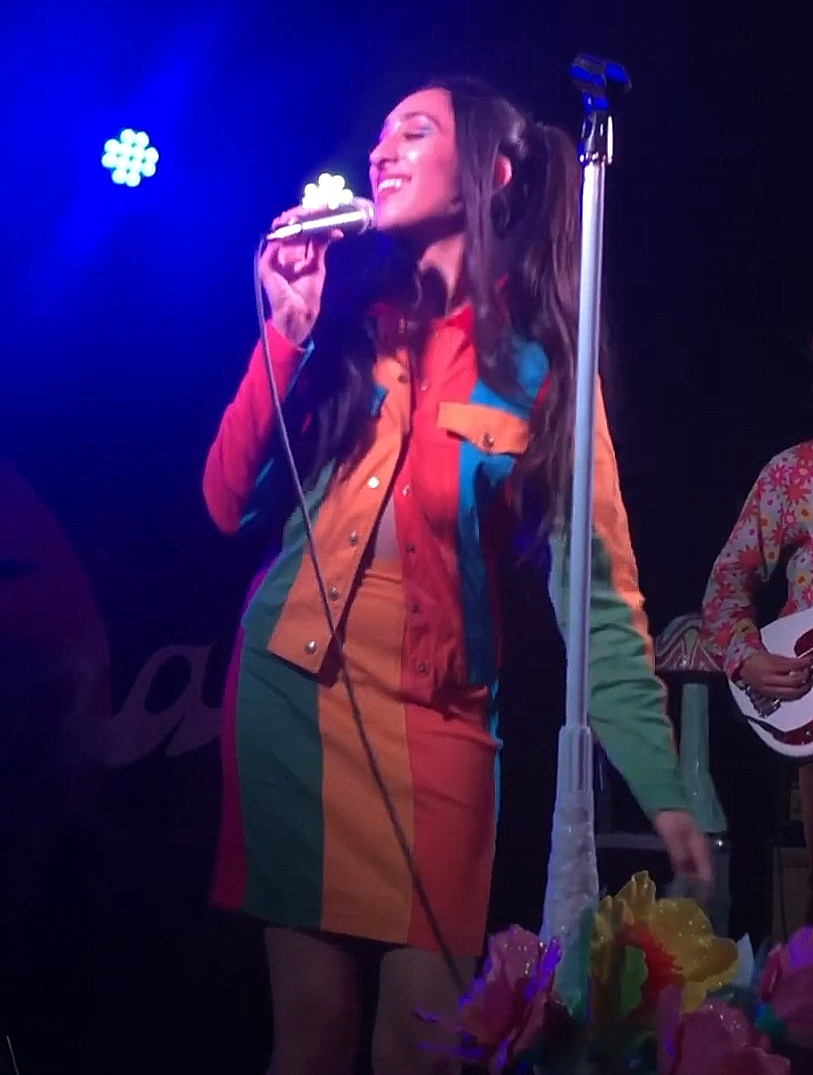
- Raveena performing in Lucid Tour 2019
- Born: Raveena Kaur Aurora; September 30, 1993 (age 33); Massachusetts, US
- Occupations: Singer; songwriter
- Years active: 2012–present
- Notable work: Asha's Awakening
- Musical career
- Genres: R&B; pop; experimental
- Instruments: Vocals; piano; guitar
- Labels: Warner Records; Empire; Moonstone Recordings LLC
- Website: raveenaaurora.com

Raveena Kaur Aurora (born September 30, 1993), known mononymously as Raveena, is an American singer and songwriter. Her music blends the genres contemporary R&B, soul, jazz, and pop with instrumentations influenced by Indian music.

Interested in music since she was young, Raveena recorded an independently released album at the age of 18. After graduating from New York University Tisch School of the Arts, Raveena published songs on SoundCloud in 2016. She gained a following after the release of her debut EP, Shanti (2017). Her debut album, Lucid (2019), was released independently and distributed through Empire Distribution, garnering critical acclaim. Later that year, she released her second EP, Moonstone (2020). After signing to Warner Records, she released her second album, Asha's Awakening (2022), and was met with positive reviews from critics. Her third album, Where the Butterflies Go in the Rain (2024), was released.

== Early life ==
Raveena Kaur Aurora was born on September 30, 1993 in Massachusetts to Indian Punjabi immigrants, a businessman father and a fashion designer mother. Both are reiki healers as well. She has a brother and a sister. She grew up in Stamford, Connecticut. She moved to Queens, New York City when she was 17 and she would visit India regularly.

Raveena is Indian Punjabi American; her family immigrated to Stamford from Punjab, India, after the 1984 anti-Sikh riots in which her maternal uncle was killed. Her family's business was burned down. She was raised in a traditional Sikh household. In Connecticut, she was more connected to nature and started "talking to trees and spirits". She described herself as "introverted," "soft," and "eccentric" growing up. Punjabi was her first language. As a child, she started writing poetry. She became exposed to R&B, Soul, Jazz and Folk music in middle school, which piqued her interest in music and influenced her musical style later in life.

At the age of 11, she started singing and would sing in the bathroom for hours a day, also studying how to use her voice and use it as an instrument. One of the first songs she learned how to sing was "Misty" which was covered by Ella Fitzgerald and Sarah Vaughan. Her first performance was in sixth grade in a talent show where she performed "Colors of the Wind" from the 1995 Disney film Pocahontas. Soon her passion eventually became a decision to pursue music professionally and "was pretty set on it, honestly. Since I was really young, I knew that there weren't any other options for me." Raveena stated that she would aspire to become "probably a reiki healer, a farmer, or even a set designer for movies” if she were not a musician.

Although Raveena's parents were initially "very hesitant" about her wanting to pursue a music career, they always supported her in developing her music skills. She stated that her father was interested in Indian Instruments such as the harmonium and tabla and kept them in their house. At the age of 12, she wrote her first song and aged 13, she began songwriting and consequently started experimenting music with different genres. She studied and graduated from New York University Tisch School of the Arts.

== Career ==
=== 2012–2019: Career beginnings, Shanti and Lucid ===
Raveena began auditioning for Broadway musicals but to no success as "there were no roles for little Indian girls". She mentioned that people told her many times that she could not be expected to sign a record deal if she was an Indian woman and said, "It's not gonna work". She said, "It never became about signing a deal at that point. I was just like, 'I don't need to rely on these things, it's gonna work if it's meant to happen.'" She would also sing for church services. When she was 18, Raveena independently released her first single and music video, "Grey Eyes" on December 4, 2012, in YouTube along with her old EP, Where We Wander, which was released independently on February 19, 2013. She later made them private.

During the beginning of her career, Raveena was denied by multiple record labels due to her being of South Asian descent: "I would have label meetings and people would be like 'We can't sign you, you're brown', to my face they would tell me 'there's no space for you.' I was forced to build the infrastructure myself. I hope that the people who have control over that infrastructure start to support marginalized artists really early on. It's such a hard phase when you're in it, and it breaks a lot of people."

Raveena worked many full-time jobs, like nannying and even worked at her first job in American Apparel as a sales associate and saved to spend her money to self-fund her music projects. When she was 21, she met and started working with record producer Everett Orr in 2015. She and Orr continued releasing singles "You Give Me That", "Johnny It's the Last Time" and "Something's Gotta Give" on SoundCloud in 2016.

After independently releasing her first EP, Shanti in December 2017, Raveena amassed a sizable online following. Shanti explored themes of self-love and healing, and blended R&B, soul, and jazz music. Her debut EP drew praise from Sidney Madden of NPR for her "cool delivery and chill-inducing falsetto runs" and "astute songwriting chops". She directed several of her own music videos where she displayed her Indian heritage and "rich interiority of women of color like herself". The third track of the EP, "No Better" is included as a soundtrack for the 2020 romantic drama film, All My Life. She also released a bonus track for the EP, "Wherever U Go" on January 12, 2018.

Raveena performed her 2017 single "If Only" on the global music platform, COLORS, in January 2018, in which her popularity rapidly increased. On June 6, 2018, she announced in social media her first headline tour, Woman is Holy Tour, a reference to her lyric from 2017 single "If Only".

In the summer of 2018, Raveena was included in ModCloth's Say It Louder campaign to celebrate individuality and strong female icons in music. She was featured alongside other outspoken female musicians like Lizzo, Awkwafina and Hayley Kiyoko. In November 2018, she performed at Tyler, The Creator's Camp Flog Gnaw Carnival.

On October 23, 2018, Raveena released a new single, "Temptation" and came out as bisexual.

In March 2019, Raveena co-headlined the Java Jazz Festival in Jakarta, Indonesia, with H.E.R and Toto.

On May 31, 2019, Raveena released her debut album Lucid, distributed through Empire Distribution. Lyrically, she explored sensuality, healing from trauma, and spirituality; through tracks like "Stronger" and "Salt Water", she opened up about her experience as a sexual assault and abuse survivor between the age of 17 and 22. Lucid was met with very positive reviews. Sidney Madden of NPR described Lucid as "comforting but nuanced, balancing cultures old and new by mashing up contemporary R&B with traditions from the South Asian diaspora". In a track review for the penultimate track, "Petal", Vrinda Jagota from Pitchfork wrote: "over the course of 12 songs, her sound becomes bolder and clearer, finding strength in everything from sun showers to her mother's resilience to her own femininity and womanhood". To support her album, Raveena announced in social media that she embarked on her second headlined tour, Lucid Tour, on June 14, 2019. "Lucid" was named one of the "Best Albums of 2019" by NPR. Raveena's 2019 single "Stronger" was named one of the "100 Best Songs of 2019" by Noisey. On December 9, 2019, Raveena performed a NPR Tiny Desk Concert.

=== 2020–2023: Moonstone and Asha's Awakening ===
On February 7, 2020, Raveena released her second four-track EP, Moonstone through Empire Distribution and Moonstone Recordings LLC, her independent label. It was released after a week of her single, "Headaches". The EP blends psychedelic indie pop with soul. Moonstone explored her past relationships and her own identity.

On February 5, 2021, Raveena released a new single and music video, "Tweety".

In 2022, she signed to Warner Records and she announced her sophomore album, Asha's Awakening, in January 2022. The record was created as a concept album from the perspective of a Punjabi space princess. The release was preceded by the singles "Rush" and "Secret," with the latter featuring American rapper Vince Staples. Asha's Awakening was released on February 11, 2022, and received acclaim from music critics. Eric Torres from Pitchfork said that it is "a throat-clearing moment for the singer, drawing on both Western and South Asian inspirations and collaborations for a blend of dance-friendly R&B songs and soothing ballads, each of which stands on her distinctive, quiet strength." In the track, "Time Flies", she opened her experience on having an abortion at age 21. Asha's Awakening was included as the "Best Albums of 2022 So Far" by Rolling Stone and also by Clash and NPR. "Rush" was included as "The Best Songs of 2022 So Far" by Rolling Stone. On December 1, 2022, Asha's Awakening was included in Rolling Stone's "The 100 Best Albums of 2022" and ranked in 84.

To promote Asha's Awakening, Raveena embarked on an Asha's Awakening national tour from 15 April 2022 to May 28, 2022. She headlined of the 2022 Coachella Music Festival. She became the first woman of Indian descent to perform as a solo artist at Coachella Music Festival. On June 19, 2022, she performed in Something in the Water festival.

On November 5, 2022, she announced that she embarked on a Latin America Tour where she performed at Primavera in Brazil, Buenos Aires and Chile. While on tour, she opened up about being sexually assaulted. She also performed at Corona Capital in Mexico City, and she made her India debut and performed at Lollapalooza India in Mumbai, India, on January 29, 2023. On May 20, 2023, she performed in Head in the Clouds Festival. On August 11, 2023, she performed in Outside Lands. She was featured on King Krule's track "Seagirl" in his fifth album, Space Heavy and in "Bloom", the tenth track of the deluxe version of Prateek Kuhad's album, The Way That Lovers Do.

=== 2024–present: Where the Butterflies Go in the Rain ===
On May 8, 2024, she released a new single, "Pluto" along with the music video. On May 22, 2024, she released another single along with the music video, "Lucky", and announced her third album, Where the Butterflies Go in the Rain, which was released on June 14, 2024, through Empire and Moonstone Recordings. She started working on the album since 2022 and "wrote almost 115 songs for it." The album explores themes of new love, maturity and comfort. She explained the album and the album title, saying: "Butterflies are so delicate that they have to hide in leaves and flowers until the rain passes so that their wings don't get crushed in the rain. I felt like that was kind of a metaphor for where I was in my life. I needed to go back to comfort—to deep rest—and stop weathering storms." The album blends pop and R&B with traditional Indian instrumentations. Elle Palmer of Far Out described the album as "a melting pot for Raveena's many sonic influences, from lush, 1970s-inspired soundscapes to bending sarods to smooth contemporary R&B. But despite her sweeping stylistic inspirations, Raveena's amalgamated sound never feels disjointed or jarring, nor does it ever approach derivative," and rated the album 4.5 out of 5. She performed three songs from the album in a live performance in the KEXP gathering space, recorded on May 1, 2025.

On June 5, 2024, she released her third single, "Junebug", with JPEGMafia as a featured artist. On July 18, 2024, she released the music video of "16 Candles".

Raveena served as the opening act for the North American leg for Tinashe's fifth concert tour, Match My Freak: World Tour. In October 2024, she released a short film of the album, Where the Butterflies Went, directed by Aerthship and executive produced by American chef Sophia Roe.

In February 2025, Raveena released the single "Sun Don't Leave Me". On February 28, 2025, she released the deluxe edition of her album with three additional songs which were completed during the January 2025 Southern California wildfires. To support the album, Raveena embarked on her fourth tour, Where the Butterflies Go in the Rain Tour, spanning North America from April 30, 2025, to June 10, 2025.

== Artistry ==
=== Influences ===
Raveena cites Asha Puthli as one of her greatest inspirations and influences. She grew up listening to Bollywood soundtracks, especially to 70s and 80s music. When she was 8 years old, she was inspired to be a singer after being introduced first to the music of singers Ella Fitzgerald and Billie Holiday. The other influences that she drew heavy inspirations are Nina Simone, Minnie Riperton, Corinne Bailey Rae, Sade, rock band Fleetwood Mac, Stevie Wonder, D'Angelo and Björk. She also grew up listening to Indian musicians Asha Bhosle, Lata Mangeshkar, R D Burman and Ravi Shankar. When writing for Lucid, Feist, Sade, Kadhja Bonet, Asha Puthli and Björk were her influences for her album. When writing for Where the Butterflies Go in the Rain, her influences include Fleetwood Mac, Brandy, Bob Marley, Joni Mitchell, and Marvin Gaye. She cited the British-Sri Lankan rapper M.I.A. as an influence and a career model, as during her teenage years, she only had M.I.A., who represented "some version of herself". When M.I.A. progressed to mainstream music, Raveena was assured that being a singer "is a path I could potentially take."

=== Musical style and songwriting ===
Raveena has been described as a R&B, soul, jazz, experimental, contemporary R&B and pop singer. She plays the guitar and the piano. The subject of her songs are based on her personal experiences or from observations. Her lyrics refer to variety of themes, such as identity politics, sexuality, heartbreaks, hardships, and mental struggles. She stated that she had always found songwriting to be a form of catharsis and having music as a way to process and reflect on her experiences "saved" her. According to her, songwriting "happens by feeling" and the song process begins from the music then she writes the lyrics. Before making Shanti, she said, "I wrote hundreds and hundreds and hundreds of songs before my first project. Good songwriting is the heart of any person's success, so I felt like the only thing I could do was write good songs to prove myself."

== Personal life ==
Since 2020, she resides in Los Angeles. In 2018, Raveena came out as bisexual through her 2018 single "Temptation". On June 3, 2021, on Twitter, she said that she thinks that she is actually pansexual. She is a spiritual Sikh as she regularly reads Buddhist, Sikh and Hindu texts. She also focuses on meditation and mindfulness. Raveena is currently dating American music producer Tyler Cole, who is known for the collaborative album The Anxiety with Willow Smith, under which the single "Meet Me At Our Spot" became popular in 2020. On July 26, 2025, her mother, Reena Aurora died from cancer.

== Other ventures ==
=== Philanthrophy ===
In May 2020, during the COVID-19 pandemic, Raveena Aurora launched a fundraising initiative to support global relief efforts. From her platform, she sought to raise awareness and monetise for Black and Brown people communities disproportionately affected by the pandemic. In November 2021, Raveena started the Aurora Loving Kindness Project, a mutual aid hub providing "healing, wellness and investment". The Project's first grant cycle was specifically for Black, Brown and queer musicians. The second cycle was for musicians of domestic violence, intimate partner violence and sexual assault. The third cycle was for musicians interested in sustainable futures through community programs such as "meditations, grants, shops for donation, non-traditional forms of trade and collaborating with other programs".

=== Activism ===
In June 2022, following the U.S. Supreme Court's 2022 overturning of Roe v. Wade, Raveena publicly shared her personal experience with abortion and highlighted the socioeconomic and emotional dimensions of reproductive choice. She expressed solidarity with marginalised communities most affected by abortion bans and advocated for direct action, including supporting local abortion funds. In October 2023, Raveena signed an open letter for the "Artists4Ceasefire" campaign alongside 185 other artists to the 46th president of the United States, Joe Biden, calling for a ceasefire to end the killing of civilians during the Gaza war. She wrote the song "Rise", the third track from Where the Butterflies Go in the Rain to show her support for the freedom of Palestine.

== Discography ==
=== Studio albums ===
Title	Album details
Lucid	Released: May 31, 2019; Label: Moonstone Recordings, Empire; Format: LP, digital download, streaming
Asha's Awakening	Released: February 11, 2022; Label: Moonstone Recordings, Warner; Format: Digital download, streaming, LP
Where the Butterflies Go in the Rain	Released: June 14, 2024; Label: Moonstone Recordings, Empire; Format: Digital download, streaming

=== Guest appearances ===
Title	Year	Album
"Bloom" (Prateek Kuhad featuring Raveena)	2025	The Way That Lovers Do (Deluxe)
"Seagirl" (King Krule featuring Raveena)	2025	Space Heavy

=== Extended plays ===
Title	Album details
Shanti (Note: Though Raveena independently released one EP in 2012, Shanti is widely reported to be her debut EP.)	Released: December 6, 2017; Label: House Music; Format: LP, digital download, streaming
Moonstone	Released: February 7, 2020; Label: Moonstone Recordings, Empire; Format: LP, digital download, streaming

=== Singles ===
List of singles, showing year released and album name shown
Title
Title	Year	Album
"You Give Me That"	2016	Non-album singles
"Johnny It's the Last Time"	2016	Non-album singles
"Spell"	2017	Shanti
"Sweet Time"	2017	Shanti
"If Only"	2017	Shanti
"I Won't Mind"	2018	Non-album singles
"Honey"	2018	Non-album singles
"Temptation"	2018	Non-album singles
"Mama"	2019	Lucid
"Stronger"	2019	Lucid
"Headaches"	2020	Moonstone
"Tweety"	2021	Non-album singles
"Rush"	2022	Asha's Awakening
"Secret" (featuring Vince Staples)	2022	Asha's Awakening
"Pluto"	2024	Where the Butterflies Go in the Rain
"Lucky"	2024	Where the Butterflies Go in the Rain
"Junebug" (featuring JPEGMAFIA)	2024	Where the Butterflies Go in the Rain
"Sun Don't Leave Me"	2025	Where the Butterflies Go in the Rain (Deluxe)
"Blissed Out"	2026	TBA

=== Music videos ===
Title	Year	Director(s)	Album
"Sweet Time"	2017	Raveena	Shanti
"Honey"	2018	Raveena, Weird Life Films	Non-album music videos
"Temptation"	2018	Jackson Tisi	Non-album music videos
"Mama"	2019	Danica Kleinknecht	Lucid
"Stronger"	2019	Raveena, Danica Kleinknecht	Lucid
"Petal"	2019	Danica Kleinknecht	Lucid
"Headaches"	2020	Raveena	Moonstone
"Tweety"	2021	Raveena, Chris Cadaver	Non-album music video
"Rush"	2022	Raveena, Munachi Osegbu	Asha's Awakening
"Secret" (featuring Vince Staples)	2022	Raveena	Asha's Awakening
"Love Overgrown"	2022	Raveena	Asha's Awakening
"Mystery"	2023	Melting Clock Films	Asha's Awakening
"Pluto"	2024	Raveena, Tanmay Chowdhary	Where the Butterflies Go in the Rain
"Lucky"	2024	Isha Dipika Walia	Where the Butterflies Go in the Rain
"Lose My Focus" (lyric video)	2024	Raveena, Tanmay Chowdhary	Where the Butterflies Go in the Rain
"16 Candles"	2024	Raveena, Tanmay Chowdhary	Where the Butterflies Go in the Rain
"Sun Don't Leave Me"	2025	Raveena, Donavon	Where the Butterflies Go in the Rain (Deluxe)
"Locus My Focus" (featuring UMI)	2025	Ameya Gupta	Where the Butterflies Go in the Rain (Deluxe)
"Morning Prayer" (featuring Nature)	2025	Aerthship	Non-album music video

== Tours ==
- Woman Is Holy Tour (2018)
- Lucid Tour (2019)
- Asha's Awakening Tour (2022)
- Where the Butterflies Go in the Rain (2025)
