= The Ooz =

The OOZ

Studio album by King Krule
- Released: 13 October 2017
- Genres: Art rock; trip hop; jazz-rock; nu jazz; post-punk; dub
- Length: 66:14
- Labels: True Panther; XL
- Producers: Dilip Harris; Archy Marshall

King Krule chronology
A New Place 2 Drown (2015)	The OOZ (2017)	Man Alive! (2020)

Singles from The OOZ
- 1. "Czech One" Released: 23 August 2017; 2. "Dum Surfer" Released: 14 September 2017; 3. "Half Man Half Shark" Released: 4 October 2017

The Ooz (stylised as The OOZ) is the third studio album by English singer-songwriter Archy Marshall, and his second album under the stage name King Krule. It was released on 13 October 2017 via True Panther Sounds and XL Recordings. The album incorporates elements of trip hop, R&B, punk rock, and jazz.

== Background ==
The album's lead single, "Czech One", was released in August 2017; it was the first King Krule song in four years. Marshall subsequently announced the release of The Ooz in September 2017, with its title and release date being first reported in The New York Times' fall preview guide. The album was Marshall's first studio album as King Krule since 6 Feet Beneath the Moon in 2013.

== Reception ==
Professional ratings
Aggregate scores
Source	Rating
AnyDecentMusic?	7.7/10
Metacritic	80/100
Review scores
Source	Rating
AllMusic	5/5 stars
The A.V. Club	B−
Consequence of Sound	B+
The Guardian	3/5 stars
The Irish Times	4/5 stars
NME	4/5 stars
Pitchfork	9.0/10
Q	4/5 stars
The Times	4/5 stars
Uncut	8/10

At Metacritic, which assigns a normalised rating out of 100 to reviews from mainstream critics, The Ooz received an average score of 80, based on 21 reviews, indicating "generally positive reviews". In a review for AllMusic, Andy Kellman compared the album to its predecessor stating that "the songwriting is more refined and the sounds are more disparate, resulting in a sort of controlled chaos, a scuzzy mix of nervy neo-rockabilly projectiles, howling dirges, and noodling dive-lounge tunes". Pitchfork gave The Ooz their "Best New Music" designation, with Jayson Greene complimenting the diversity of musical styles used on the album, as well as the distinctive sounds and textures. He wrote that the album "is the richest and most immersive album the London singer-songwriter has made yet" and that it is "a masterpiece of jaundiced vision from one of the most compelling artists alive". Alexis Petridis of The Guardian was more ambivalent, acknowledging the diverse musical styles while also considering the album to be "frustrating" and "a difficult listen". Though he recommends the album, Petridis considers the album's length to be a detraction, writing, "But self-indulgence is also its biggest drawback...The Ooz lasts more than an hour and virtually every track is allowed to ramble on for longer than it needs to". It was nominated for the 2018 Mercury Prize.

=== Accolades ===
==== Year-end lists ====
Publication	Accolade	Rank	Ref.
Billboard	Billboard's 50 Best Albums of 2017: Critics' Picks	45	
Clash	Clash Albums of the Year 2017	8	
Consequence of Sound	Top 50 Albums of 2017	31	
Drowned in Sound	Favourite Albums of 2017	87	
The Guardian	The Best Albums of 2017	22	
The Independent	30 Best Albums of 2017	12	
NME	NME's Albums of the Year 2017	16	
Pitchfork	The 50 Best Albums of 2017	3	
Spin	50 Best Albums of 2017	28	
Vice	The 100 Best Albums of 2017	3	

==== Decade-end lists ====
Publication	Accolade	Rank	Ref.
Treble	Top 150 Albums of the 2010s	70	
Pitchfork	The 200 Best Albums of the 2010s	60	
Gorilla vs. Bear	Albums of the Decade	47	

== Track listing ==
All music is composed by Archy Marshall. All words by Marshall, except where noted.

No.	Title	Lyrics	Length
1.	"Biscuit Town"		3:42
2.	"The Locomotive"		2:51
3.	"Dum Surfer"		4:23
4.	"Slush Puppy"	Marshall; Kaya Wilkins	2:42
5.	"Bermondsey Bosom (Left)"		1:14
6.	"Logos"		3:50
7.	"Sublunary"		2:10
8.	"Lonely Blue"		4:44
9.	"Cadet Limbo"		4:52
10.	"Emergency Blimp"		2:54
11.	"Czech One"		4:15
12.	"A Slide In (New Drugs)"		3:05
13.	"Vidual"		2:19
14.	"Bermondsey Bosom (Right)"		1:05
15.	"Half Man Half Shark"		5:02
16.	"The Cadet Leaps"		4:21
17.	"The Ooz"		4:35
18.	"Midnight 01 (Deep Sea Diver)"		3:53
19.	"La Lune"		4:17
Total length:			66:14

Notes

- "Midnight 01 (Deep Sea Diver)" contains a sample of "Temptation Sensation", written by Heinz Kiessling.

== Personnel ==
Musicians

- King Krule – vocals, guitar, bass, drums, keys, vocoder
- Dilip Harris – triangle, percussion, vibraphone, synth, marimba
- James Wilson – bass, vocals (3)
- George Bass – drums
- Ignacio Salvadores – saxophone
- Jack Towell – guitar
- Andy Ramsay – drum programming, percussion
- Marc Pell – bongos, tambourine
- Nana Giobbi – piano
- Okay Kaya – additional vocals (4)
- Beatriz Ortiz Mendes – spoken word (5)
- Idris Vicuña – spoken word (16)
- Maya Coline – backing vocals (11, 17)
- Ella Rimmer – backing vocals (11)
- Adam Marshall – spoken word (14), backing vocals (15)
- Maria Dmetriev – spoken word (18)

Production

- Dilip Harris – co-production, mixing, engineering
- Archy Marshall – co-production, engineering
- Andy Ramsay – engineering
- Senor El Funkelinos – engineering
- Connor Atanda – engineering
- Barry Grint – mastering

== Charts ==
Chart (2017)	Peak position
Australian Albums (ARIA)	51
Belgian Albums (Ultratop Flanders)	63
Belgian Albums (Ultratop Wallonia)	81
French Albums (SNEP)	95
Irish Albums (IRMA)	60
New Zealand Heatseeker Albums (RMNZ)	2
Portuguese Albums (AFP)	45
Scottish Albums (Official Charts)	68
Swiss Albums (Schweizer Hitparade)	58
UK Albums (Official Charts)	23
UK Independent Albums (Official Charts)	4
US Billboard 200	114
US Independent Albums (Billboard)	13
US Top Alternative Albums (Billboard)	14
US Top Rock Albums (Billboard)	18
