= Asha's Awakening =

- Standard cover

Studio album by Raveena
- Released: February 11, 2022
- Recorded: 2021
- Length: 61:42
- Label: Warner Records
- Producer: Aaron Liao; Andrew Sarlo; Everett Orr; Jeff Kleinman; Raveena; Rostam Batmanglij; Yeek

Raveena chronology
Moonstone (2020)	Asha's Awakening (2022)	Where the Butterflies Go in the Rain (2024)

Singles from Asha's Awakening
- 1. "Rush" Released: January 14, 2022; 2. "Secret" Released: January 28, 2022

Asha's Awakening is the second studio album by American singer-songwriter Raveena, which was released through Warner Records on February 11, 2022. The album was preceded by the singles "Rush" and "Secret". Asha's Awakening is a concept album from the point of view of a Punjabi space princess called Asha. The album received positive reviews from critics.

Inspired by the history of South Asian music and influenced by the 60s, 70s and early 2000s eras of South Asian musicians and Western musicians, the album revolves around a character's journey called Asha, who is a Punjabi space princess from ancient Punjab who learns that life is chaotic and it's full of ups and downs. Through this, the character learns to find peace as a human. But in Raveena's perspective, the album explores her South Asian identity, her personal growth, the modern culture and her past relationships.

== Background and release ==
Indian-American singer-songwriter Raveena, who is known for her debut EP, Shanti, in 2017 as well as her debut album, Lucid, which was distributed by Empire Distribution, was released in 2019, which was critically acclaimed. In 2022, she signed to the major record label, Warner Records, and she announced that she would release her second album, which was also her first major label debut, Asha's Awakening. Asha's Awakening was released on February 11, following two singles from the album, "Rush" and "Secret" (featuring Vince Staples). She performed three songs from the album "Mystery", "Headaches", and "Kathy Left 4 Kathmandu" in a live performance in the KEXP gathering space, recorded on April 27, 2022.

== Writing and recording ==
I think I was in quarantine, and I had a lot of time on my hands and I was super bored. Out of that boredom came this really childlike imagination. I had time to watch a lot of movies. I set up a little projector and just watched sci-fi movies and Bollywood movies. And it was just like, there was a connection here between both of those worlds. The character just came to me in the night and I wrote down the whole story. I sent it to this amazing illustrator Lili, who kind of visualize the whole world for us in 2-D. Then we would use her concept art with all the other collaborators and be like, 'how do we bring this character to life?' Every detail of this world is very thought out and very intentional. There's a whole movie written behind the album, basically.

— Aurora talking about the coming up of the character, Asha, for office magazine.

Raveena, while in quarantine, described that out of boredom, she created the character after watching and getting inspired by sci-fi movies, Bollywood movies and Punjabi folklore. She wrote the entire story of the character at night. The character was illustrated in 2D by the illustrator Lili Tae.

Raveena wrote on her Instagram that "Asha is a Punjabi space princess from the 1600's who gets transported to a highly spiritually advanced distant planet named 'Sanataan', where she is trained by the Kamlesh aliens for 1000 years in spirituality and cosmic magic and eventually rules as a princess there".

== Music and lyrics ==
Asha's Awakening includes elements of R&B, rock, and disco, along with Bollywood instrumentation. The album explores Raveena's South Asian identity, her personal growth, the modern culture and her past relationships. The album has used and featured a lot of Indian instruments such as the tabla, the electric sitar, the swarmandel, the flute, the Bansuri and the kanjira. Alice Coltrane, Asha Puthli, The Beatles, Miles Davis, M.I.A., Timbaland, Missy Elliott, Solange, Jai Paul, Nelly Furtado and Sade are the main influences on the album. In some songs like "Rush", "Secret", "Magic", "Kismet" and "Asha's Kiss", while singing in English, she included different languages with Hindi and Punjabi.

== Promotion ==
=== Tour ===
To support her album Asha's Awakening, Raveena embarked on the Asha's Awakening Tour, her second headlining concert tour after three years. On social media, she announced Asha's Awakening national tour. The tour covered North America with 21 dates. It was commenced on April 15, 2022, in Indio, California. While at Indio, she performed at Coachella 2022, making her the first woman of Indian descent to perform at Coachella. The tour was concluded on May 28, 2022, in Los Angeles, California.

== Critical reception ==
Professional ratings
Aggregate scores
Source	Rating
Metacritic	81/100
Review scores
Source	Rating
Clash	8/10
Pitchfork	7.5/10
The Guardian	4/5 stars
NME	4/5 stars
Loud and Quiet	7/10

Asha's Awakening received widespread acclaim from music critics. On Metacritic, which assigns a normalised score out of 100 to ratings from publications, the album received a weighted mean score of 81 based on 4 reviews, indicating "universal acclaim".

Clash rated the album eight out of ten and described it as "a sterling project from front to back. Part romance epic, part sci-fi R&B dreamcatcher, Raveena sounds better than ever before. [...] The album is bold, eccentric and proudly rooted in classical South Asian traditions, whilst sounding fresh and accessible at the same time."

Pitchfork said that it is "a throat-clearing moment for the singer, drawing on both Western and South Asian inspirations and collaborations for a blend of dance-friendly R&B songs and soothing ballads, each of which stands on her distinctive, quiet strength." and rated it 7.5 out of ten.

The Guardian said that, "Mainstream pop music should clear some room for her: it would make things infinitely more interesting.", and rated it four stars.

NME said that, "If this is an awakening, consider our attention well and truly captive; clever, confident, and utterly comforting." and rated it four stars

Rolling Stone, Clash and NPR included Asha's Awakening as the "Best Albums of 2022 So Far". The first single, "Rush", was named in the list as "The Best Songs of 2022 So Far" by Rolling Stone. The second single "Secret", was named in the list as "R&B/Hip-Hop Fresh Picks of the Week" by Billboard. On December 1, 2022, Asha's Awakening was included in Rolling Stone's "The 100 Best Albums of 2022" and ranked in 84.

Krool Toys created and released a video game in a Game Boy inspired by Asha's Awakening. The video game features the penultimate track, "Let Your Breath Become a Flower (Guided Meditation)".

== Track listing ==
Asha's Awakening track listing
No.	Title	Writer(s)	Producer(s)	Length
1.	"Rush"	Raveena Aurora; Aaron Liao; Cale Hawkins; Everett Orr; Leo Kalyan	Orr	3:05
2.	"Secret"	Aurora; Vince Staples; Orr	Orr	3:22
3.	"Magic"	Aurora; Liao; Chris Charles; Simmi Ahuja; Yeek	Aurora; Liao; Yeek	2:47
4.	"Kismet"	Aurora; Liao; Jeff Kleinman	Aurora; Liao; Kleinman	3:20
5.	"Kathy Left 4 Kathmandu"	Aurora; Liao; Orr	Orr	2:27
6.	"Mystery"	Aurora; Liao; Hawkins; Orr	Orr	4:00
7.	"Circuit Board"	Aurora; Liao; Orr	Orr	3:47
8.	"The Internet Is Like Eating Plastic"	Aurora; Liao	Liao	2:22
9.	"Arrival to the Garden of Cosmic Speculation (Intermission)"	Aurora; Liao	Aurora; Liao	2:22
10.	"Asha's Kiss"	Aurora; Liao; Asha Puthli; Orr	Liao; Orr	6:18
11.	"Time Flies"	Aurora; Liao; Rostam Batmanglij	Batmanglij	4:20
12.	"Love Overgrown"	Aurora; Liao; Kleinman	Kleinman	3:20
13.	"Endless Summer"	Aurora; Liao; Andrew Sarlo	Aurora; Liao; Sarlo	3:52
14.	"New Drugs"	Aurora; Liao; Kleinman; TWEAKS	Kleinman	4:44
15.	"Let Your Breath Become a Flower (Guided Meditation)"	Aurora; Liao	Liao	13:31
Total length:				61:42
