= Space Heavy =

Studio album by King Krule
- Released: 9 June 2023
- Recorded: 2020–2022
- Length: 44:43
- Labels: XL; Matador
- Producers: Archy Marshall; Dilip Harris

King Krule chronology
Man Alive! (2020)	Space Heavy (2023)

Singles from Space Heavy
- 1. "Seaforth" Released: 13 April 2023; 2. "If Only It Was Warmth" Released: 18 May 2023; 3. "Flimsier" Released: 6 June 2023

Space Heavy is the fifth studio album by English singer-songwriter Archy Marshall, and his fourth album under the stage name King Krule. The album was released on 9 June 2023 through XL Recordings and Matador Records. The first single off the album, "Seaforth", was released on 13 April 2023 along with the album's announcement. Marshall will tour the UK in support of the album following its release.

== Background and recording ==
The album was written and recorded between 2020 and 2022, with Marshall working on the album during commutes between London and Liverpool, where he has residences. He had moved to Liverpool with his partner Charlotte Patmore after she gave birth to their child. During the commutes, Marshall became "fascinated by the notion of 'the space between'", which became the album's theme, along with a "narrative of lost connection" and "losing people and situations to the guillotine of the universe". The songs contain a balance of negative and positive space.

Marshall wrote most of the lyrics himself, after which he worked on the music with producer Dilip Harris and his live band, saxophonist Ignacio Salvadores, drummer George Bass, bassist James Wilson and guitarist Jack Towell.

== Critical reception ==
Professional ratings
Aggregate scores
Source	Rating
AnyDecentMusic?	7.5/10
Metacritic	79/100
Review scores
Source	Rating
AllMusic	4/5 stars
Clash	8/10
NME	4/5 stars
Pitchfork	7.5/10
The Skinny	4/5 stars
Slant Magazine	4/5 stars

Space Heavy received a score of 79 out of 100 on review aggregator Metacritic from fifteen critics' reviews, indicating "generally favorable" reception. Writing for NME, Sam Moore felt that the album "breaks new ground while further enriching his tried-and-trusted soundscapes" and felt that "some of the more mellow offerings do have the tendency to bleed into the next, so Space Heavy's whiplash-inducing moments provide some welcome variety". Moore called "Seagirl" the highlight as Marshall and Raveena's "differing styles beautifully interweave and complement one another".

James Mellen of Clash described the album as "an ambitious world of dreams, loss, and the bleak brutality of the universe" as well as "a dynamic, visceral body of work, every bar demanding attention with its chronic shapeshifting nature". Mellen also felt that Space Heavy "weaves its way through a plethora of styles, implementing a range of genres into the world he has created" and concluded that its "never-ending sonic exploration is continually excellent". Steve Erickson of Slant Magazine opined that "the album's songs are carefully grounded" and "conjure very specific visual images to mind, specifically of a solitary day by the sea", with Erickson also finding its music to be "grimmer than the lyrics", which makes it "risk getting swamped by its downbeat mood".

Jamie Wilde of The Skinny wrote that the album's "lush song transitions, guest vocals and sharp bursts of abrasiveness all add further character. But above all else, it's the inimitability of Krule that's still as prominent as ever – sometimes primal with anger, others tender and subdued, nobody sounds like him". Mojo called it "Another mesmerising, profound, excellent record" from Marshall, while Uncut was less favourable, opining that it "happily exists in something of a fog – wilfully embracing hazy, almost groggy textures". Reviewing the album for AllMusic, Thom Jurek concluded that, "Taken whole, Space Heavy is tense, primitive, unnerving lyrically. While observing the spaces between, Marshall's songs, reflective, consumptive, instructive and compelling, simultaneously create and destroy spaces between worlds he observes, so he might remake the world he lives in with restraint, grace, a broken heart, and brutal honesty."

== Track listing ==
All music is composed by Archy Marshall. All words by Marshall, except where noted.

Space Heavy track listing
No.	Title	Writer(s)	Length
1.	"Flimsier"		3:59
2.	"Pink Shell"	Archy Marshall; Ignacio Salvadores	2:15
3.	"Seaforth"	Marshall; Marina Marshall Patmore	4:05
4.	"That Is My Life, That Is Yours"		3:11
5.	"Tortoise of Independency"		2:07
6.	"Empty Stomach Space Cadet"		2:07
7.	"Flimsy"		1:13
8.	"Hamburgerphobia"		3:19
9.	"From the Swamp"		3:03
10.	"Seagirl" (featuring Raveena)	Marshall; Raveena Aurora; Everett Orr	3:22
11.	"Our Vacuum"		3:22
12.	"Space Heavy"		3:04
13.	"When Vanishing"		3:12
14.	"If Only It Was Warmth"		3:17
15.	"Wednesday Overcast"		3:07
Total length:			44:43

== Charts ==
Chart performance for Space Heavy
Chart (2023)	Peak position
Australian Vinyl Albums (ARIA)	6
Belgian Albums (Ultratop Flanders)	71
French Albums (SNEP)	191
New Zealand Albums (RMNZ)	25
Scottish Albums (Official Charts)	12
US Top Album Sales (Billboard)	42
UK Albums (Official Charts)	18
UK Independent Albums (Official Charts)	5
