= Man Alive! (King Krule album) =

Studio album by King Krule
- Released: 21 February 2020
- Length: 41:45
- Labels: Matador; True Panther; XL
- Producers: Archy Marshall; Dilip Harris

King Krule chronology
The Ooz (2017)	Man Alive! (2020)	Space Heavy (2023)

Singles from Man Alive
- 1. "(Don't Let the Dragon) Draag On" Released: 14 January 2020; 2. "Alone, Omen 3" Released: 5 February 2020; 3. "Cellular" Released: 18 February 2020

Man Alive! is the fourth studio album by English singer-songwriter Archy Marshall, and his third album under the stage name King Krule. The album was released on 21 February 2020 through True Panther Sounds, XL Recordings, and Matador Records.

The first single off the album, "(Don't Let the Dragon) Draag On" debuted on 14 January 2020 on Pitchfork.

== Critical reception ==
Professional ratings
Aggregate scores
Source	Rating
AnyDecentMusic?	7.1/10
Metacritic	73/100
Review scores
Source	Rating
AllMusic	4/5 stars
Entertainment Weekly	B
The Guardian	2/5 stars
Mojo	3/5 stars
NME	4/5 stars
The Observer	4/5 stars
Pitchfork	7.7/10
Q	4/5 stars
The Times	4/5 stars
Uncut	6/10

At Metacritic, which assigns a normalised rating out of 100 to reviews from mainstream critics, Man Alive! received an average score of 73, based on 19 reviews, indicating "generally favorable reviews".

Sam Moore of NME wrote that the album "is lifted by Marshall's knack for hazy social observations and poetic metropolitan storytelling", deeming it more accessible than The Ooz due to its condensed length and "more optimistic worldview". Niall Doherty of Q likewise found the sound of Man Alive! to be "more welcoming... not quite as warped as it once was", while adding that Marshall "sounds at peace here, and back to his best". Wilf Skinner of Clash praised the album as "an absorbing consolidation of Marshall's inimitable sound". "Holding to Marshall's wavelength requires a little more investment than the dingy music asks for, but that's not to say his shadowland of the heart lacks nuance," wrote Pitchfork critic Jazz Monroe, who was struck by "Marshall's intensity with words, the way he threads and knots them like jute rope to hoist himself out of psychic craters". AllMusic editor Andy Kellman highlighted Ignacio Salvadores' musical contributions: "They add necessary color to Marshall's gray vision, peculiar and riveting as it is on its own".

Entertainment Weekly's Leah Greenblatt was more qualified in her praise, finding the tracks "enveloping" but also occasionally "exhausting—a bleakness that begs, eventually, for a little fresh air." Tom Sloman of DIY found that the "frustrating" album finds Marshall "in transition", while Greg Cochrane of Uncut wrote that "lush as it sometimes is, [it] too often disappears into an indecipherable cloud of smoke". Writing in The Guardian, critic Rachel Aroesti wrote that the album's "bagginess and unremitting gloom mean it often struggles to hold the attention and unfortunately lacks much discernible appeal at all." Tom Hull gave it a B grade and said that Marshall "has a rep for drawing on punk and hip-hop, but mostly comes up with Nick Cave dark tones".

== Track listing ==
All tracks are written by Archy Marshall.

Man Alive! track listing
No.	Title	Length
1.	"Cellular"	2:59
2.	"Supermarché"	2:36
3.	"Stoned Again"	3:25
4.	"Comet Face"	3:13
5.	"The Dream"	1:39
6.	"Perfecto Miserable"	3:15
7.	"Alone, Omen 3"	2:47
8.	"Slinky"	2:50
9.	"Airport Antenatal Airplane"	2:15
10.	"(Don't Let the Dragon) Draag On"	2:31
11.	"Theme for the Cross"	4:06
12.	"Underclass"	3:30
13.	"Energy Fleets"	2:34
14.	"Please Complete Thee"	4:05
Total length:		41:45

Japanese edition bonus tracks
No.	Title	Length
15.	"Perfecto Miserable" (Hey World! Version)
16.	"Alone, Omen 3" (Hey World! Version)
17.	"(Don't Let the Dragon) Draag On" (Hey World! Version)
18.	"Energy Fleets" (Hey World! Version)

Notes

- "Comet Face" contains elements from "Tramp", written by Jimmy McCracklin and Lowell Fulson; featuring samples from the Otis Redding and Carla Thomas recording.
- "Alone, Omen 3" contains portions of "Never Had a Dream", written by Leroy Bonner, Marshall Jones, Ralph Middlebrooks, Walter Morrison, Norman Napier, Andrew Nowland and Gregory Webster; performed by the Ohio Players.
- "Airport Antenatal Airplane" and "(Don't Let the Dragon) Draag On" contain elements of "Small Crimes", written, recorded and performed by Nilüfer Yanya.

== Personnel ==
Musicians

- King Krule – performance, vocals, guitar, bass, synthesizers, keyboards, drum programming
- Ignacio Salvadores – backing vocals (1, 3, 11, 13), saxophone (1, 3, 4, 8, 11–13)
- George Bass – drums (6, 8), percussion (13)
- James Wilson – bass (6, 7, 13)
- Yassin – backing vocals (7)
- Jack Towell – vocoder (13)

Technical

- Archy Marshall – production, mixing
- Dilip Harris – production, mixing
- Guy Davie – mastering

Artwork

- Oliver Howard – paintings, photographs
- Adam Marshall – paintings, photographs
- Jack Marshall – paintings, photographs, curation
- Charlotte Patmore – paintings, photographs

== Charts ==
Chart performance for Man Alive!
Chart (2020)	Peak position
Australian Albums (ARIA)	35
Belgian Albums (Ultratop Flanders)	45
Belgian Albums (Ultratop Wallonia)	163
French Albums (SNEP)	121
German Albums (Offizielle Top 100)	42
Irish Albums (Official Charts)	39
Scottish Albums (Official Charts)	18
Swiss Albums (Schweizer Hitparade)	89
UK Albums (Official Charts)	12
UK Independent Albums (Official Charts)	2
US Billboard 200	84
US Independent Albums (Billboard)	9
US Top Alternative Albums (Billboard)	6
US Top Rock Albums (Billboard)	10
