= A New Place 2 Drown =

Studio album by Archy Marshall
- Released: 10 December 2015
- Genres: Trip hop; post-dubstep; alternative hip-hop
- Length: 37:51
- Labels: True Panther; XL
- Producer: Archy Marshall

Archy Marshall chronology
6 Feet Beneath the Moon (2013)	A New Place 2 Drown (2015)	The Ooz (2017)

A New Place 2 Drown is the second studio album by English singer-songwriter Archy Marshall, better known by his stage name King Krule. It was released on 10 December 2015 via True Panther Sounds and XL Recordings. The album is accompanied by a book published by Topsafe also named A New Place 2 Drown that showcases the poetry and artwork of Archy and his older brother Jack and a short film directed by Will Robson-Scott.

== Critical reception ==
Professional ratings
Aggregate scores
Source	Rating
AnyDecentMusic?	7.3/10
Metacritic	74/100
Review scores
Source	Rating
AllMusic	4/5 stars
Consequence of Sound	C−
DIY	4/5 stars
Exclaim!	7/10
Financial Times	4/5 stars
Now	4/5
Pitchfork	8.6/10
Spectrum Culture	4.25/5 stars
Spin	7/10
Uncut	7/10

At Metacritic, which assigns a normalised rating out of 100 to reviews from mainstream critics, A New Place 2 Drown received an average score of 74, based on six reviews, indicating "generally favourable reviews". Ebyan Abdigir of Exclaim! said Marshall reveals himself "through the sound of his combined musical sensibilities and artistry, rather than his gut-punching lyrics and bellowing voice." Pitchfork reviewer Jayson Greene stated that Marshall had "made tremendous strides as a producer" and said that he should produce more music for rap artists. Greene awarded the album a Best New Music accolade.

Pitchfork placed A New Place 2 Drown at number 33 on its list of "The 50 Best Albums of 2015".

== Track listing ==
All tracks are written by Archy Marshall.

No.	Title	Length
1.	"Any God of Yours"	1:39
2.	"Swell"	2:09
3.	"Arise Dear Brother"	2:55
4.	"Ammi Ammi" (featuring Jamie Isaac)	3:30
5.	"Buffed Sky"	2:38
6.	"Sex With Nobody"	3:33
7.	"Eye's Drift"	2:22
8.	"The Sea Liner MK 1"	3:36
9.	"Empty Vessels"	3:29
10.	"New Builds"	1:33
11.	"Dull Boys"	3:25
12.	"Thames Water"	7:01
Total length:		37:51

== Charts ==
Chart (2015)	Peak position
UK Dance Albums (Official Charts)	12
US Heatseekers Albums (Billboard)	10
