= Moonstone (EP) =

EP by Raveena
- Released: 7 February 2020
- Recorded: 2018–2019
- Genres: Contemporary R&B; neo-soul; indie pop; soul
- Length: 15:19
- Labels: Moonstone Recordings, LLC; Empire
- Producer: Everett Orr

Raveena chronology
Lucid (2019)	Moonstone (2020)	Asha's Awakening (2022)

Moonstone is the second extended play (EP) by American singer-songwriter Raveena Aurora, released under the name Raveena on 7 February 2020 through Moonstone Recordings, LLC, and Empire. The EP was produced by Everett Orr and written by Raveena, who also co-produced and directed the music video for the lead single "Headaches". Raveena released "Headaches" as the lead single on 31 January 2020.

== Background ==
Moonstone was recorded during the same sessions as Raveena's debut album Lucid (2019), produced by longtime collaborator Everett Orr, with whom Raveena began working in 2015. Raveena felt the songs constituted their own distinct project separate from Lucid, describing the EP in a tweet as "a sweet lil collection of songs that we wrote while making Lucid but that felt like their own project. Songs to kiss goodnight to your loved ones, amongst other things." She described it as "a bittersweet goodbye" to youth and first loves.

The EP is named after Raveena's own record label, Moonstone Recordings, LLC. The lead single "Headaches" was accompanied by a self-directed music video featuring Raveena and YouTuber Hitomi Mochizuki as lovers. Following the release of Moonstone, Raveena was scheduled to perform at Coachella, Wanderland, and Hangout Music Festivals in spring 2020, which would have been her first live appearances since her debut North American tour in 2019, but these performances were cancelled due to the COVID-19 pandemic.

== Music ==
Moonstone blends psychedelic indie pop with soul and R&B. Compared to Lucid, the EP leans more heavily toward indie rock and experimental electronic pop, with soul and R&B influences remaining present but less pronounced. Critics noted the influence of Corinne Bailey Rae and Minnie Riperton in the production, describing the sound as featuring "an oceanic guitar tone and drizzly keys." The EP is thematically focused on nostalgia, youth, and the bittersweetness of fleeting romantic connections.

"Headaches" explores confusion and longing in a romantic relationship. "Close 2 U" finds bliss in simple domestic moments of closeness. "Heartbeat" contrasts soft instrumentation with a thumping bass evoking a late-night dancefloor, celebrating a fleeting connection and ending with a cinematic synth line. Closing track "Starflower" is a sparse acoustic lullaby featuring arpeggiated chords on a harp-like string instrument. In the song, Raveena sings that starflowers are "the stars of the earth," connecting earthly and astral imagery to close the EP.

== Credits and personnel ==
Credits adapted from Spotify.

- Raveena Aurora – vocalist (all tracks), lyricist (all tracks), producer (track 1), director (music video, track 1)
- Everett Orr – producer (tracks 2–4), mixing (all tracks)

== Track listing ==
All tracks written by Raveena Aurora.

No.	Title	Producer(s)	Length
1	"Headaches"	Raveena Aurora	3:51
2	"Close 2 U"	Everett Orr	3:45
3	"Heartbeat"	Everett Orr	4:06
4	"Starflower"	Everett Orr	3:37
Total length:			15:19
