= Horsey (band) =

English rock band

- Origin: London, England, UK
- Genres: Alternative rock; Art rock; Post punk
- Years active: 2016–present
- Members: Theo McCabe; Jacob Read; Jack Marshall; George Bass

Horsey are an English rock band from London, formed in 2016. Their sound has been described as art rock, jazz and post punk.

They are associated with fellow artist King Krule, who produced their debut EP and featured on the lead single, Seahorse, off their debut album. Their members include his brother Jack Marshall on bass, his drummer George Bass on drums, and his friend and collaborator Jacob Read on guitar, who is known in his own right for releasing music as Jerkcurb.

They released their debut EP Everyone's Tongue in 2017, and in 2021 released their debut LP Debonair to positive critical reception.

== Discography ==
=== Studio albums ===
- Debonair (2021, Untitled Recs)

=== Singles ===
- Everyone's Tongue (2017)
- Park Outside Your Mother's House (2017)
- Bread & Butter (2019)
- Sippy Cup (2020)
- Seahorse (2021)
- Lagoon (2021)
