= Where the Butterflies Go in the Rain =

Studio album by Raveena
- Released: June 14, 2024
- Genres: R&B; pop; jazz; neo soul
- Length: 49:47
- Labels: Moonstone Recordings; EMPIRE

Raveena chronology
Asha's Awakening (2022)	Where the Butterflies Go in the Rain (2024)

Where the Butterflies Go in the Rain is the third studio album by American singer-songwriter Raveena. It was released on June 14, 2024, through Moonstone Recordings and Empire. The album followed her 2022 studio album Asha's Awakening.

== Background and release ==
Raveena announced Where the Butterflies Go in the Rain in May 2024 alongside the single "Lucky". Earlier that month, she released "Pluto", her first song since Asha's Awakening. In a press statement reported by Pitchfork, Raveena explained that the title refers to butterflies hiding from rain to protect their wings, which she connected to her own need for comfort and rest.

The album was released on June 14, 2024, and contains 14 tracks. A deluxe edition was later released with 18 tracks.

== Composition ==
Apple Music described the album as R&B/soul and wrote that it blends R&B with pop and jazz. Elle Palmer of Far Out Magazine described the album as combining 1970s-inspired sounds, sarod instrumentation and contemporary R&B. EMPIRE described the album as combining personal storytelling with early 2000s pop influences.

== Critical reception ==
Far Out Magazine gave the album a positive review, describing it as a cohesive mix of Raveena's musical influences and writing that the album avoids sounding derivative despite its broad range of inspirations. Shatter the Standards also praised the album's sound, describing it as a convergence of 1970s-inspired music, sarod sounds and modern R&B. Singular Culture described the album as blending 1970s nostalgia with contemporary R&B, while highlighting its string arrangements, bass lines and experimental elements.

== Track listing ==
Track listing adapted from Apple Music and Spotify.

1. "Pluto"
2. "Lucky"
3. "Rise"
4. "Every Color"
5. "Baby Mama"
6. "Junebug" (featuring JPEGMafia)
7. "Lose My Focus"
8. "We Should Move Somewhere Beautiful" (featuring Arima Ederra)
9. "Kid"
10. "16 Candles" (featuring Ganavya)
11. "Smile for Me"
12. "Afternoon Tea with the Auroras" (Interlude)
13. "Little Bird"
14. "Water"
