= Ignacio Salvadores =

Argentine musician, composer, and curator

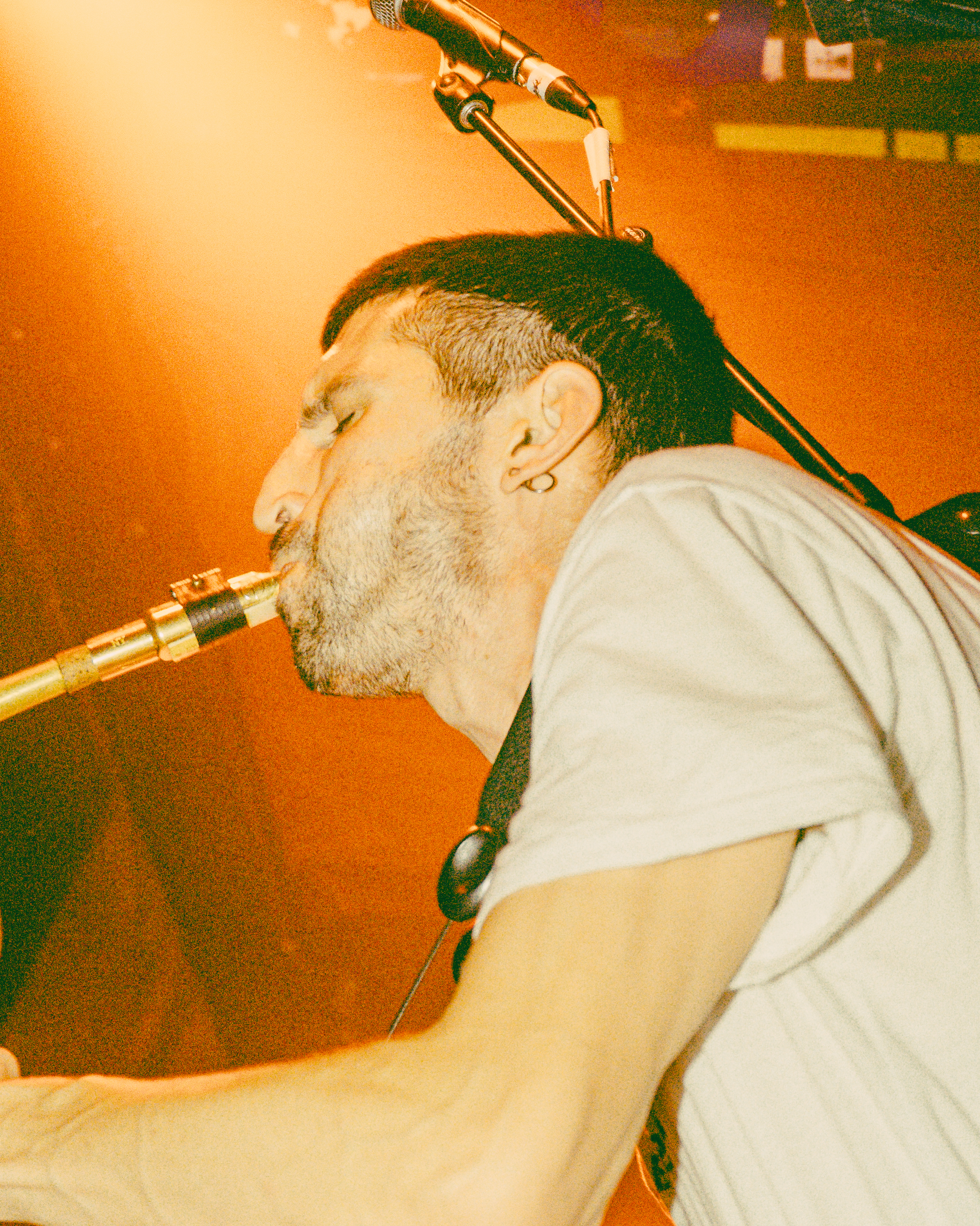
- Salvadores in 2025

Background information
- Also known as: Gal Go
- Born: Buenos Aires, Argentina
- Origin: London, England
- Genres: Experimental; Post-punk; Jazz; Indie rock
- Instruments: Saxophone; guitar; vocals
- Years active: 2010s–present
- Member of: King Krule
- Formerly of: Los Hermanos McKenzie

Ignacio Salvadores is an Argentine multi-instrumentalist, vocalist, curator, and composer based in London. He is known as a collaborator and live band member for the British artist Archy Marshall (King Krule), and for his experimental solo project, Gal Go.

== Early life and career ==
Salvadores was born and raised in Buenos Aires, Argentina. During the 2010s, he was a member of the Buenos Aires underground band Los Hermanos McKenzie. He relocated to London, arriving in 2016 shortly after the Brexit referendum result.

== King Krule ==
Salvadores was discovered by Archy Marshall after Marshall viewed a video of Salvadores playing the saxophone under a bridge in East London. This led to Salvadores becoming a core member of the King Krule live band and a studio collaborator.

Salvadores contributed to King Krule's Mercury Prize-nominated album The Ooz (2017), with Marshall crediting Salvadores for helping to shape the project's sonic direction. He subsequently provided saxophone and additional instrumentation for the studio albums Man Alive! (2020) and Space Heavy (2023).

== Gal Go (solo project) ==
Alongside his work with King Krule, Salvadores releases and performs experimental solo music under the moniker Gal Go. His solo work incorporates elements of jazz, rock, and electronic music, and features vocals sung primarily in his native Spanish.

In 2020, he released the EP vacío fuego, followed by Vacío vaciador in 2022. He also collaborated with musician Tom Grey on the 2021 electronic-jazz crossover album Gal Go Grey. In October 2025, Gal Go released his debut full-length vinyl album, solo quiero ser tu perro, which featured collaborations with Archy Marshall and the Mexican band Diles que no me maten.

As a solo live performer, Gal Go has performed at the Institute of Contemporary Arts (ICA) in London alongside artists such as drummer Dillon Harrison and saxophonist Isaac Robertson. He also performed at the 2026 Primavera Sound festival in Barcelona.

Salvadores also works as a live film composer. In early 2026, he was commissioned to lead a live score performance for the 1911 Italian silent film L'Inferno at Theatreship in Canary Wharf, as part of a programme supported by the British Film Institute (BFI) Film Audience Network. He was subsequently appointed as curator of contemporary and experimental music at the venue.

== Discography ==
=== As Gal Go ===
- vacío fuego (EP, 2020)
- Gal Go Grey (collaborative album with Tom Grey, 2021)
- Vacío vaciador (EP, 2022)
- solo quiero ser tu perro (album, October 2025)

=== With King Krule ===
- The Ooz (2017)
- Man Alive! (2020)
- Space Heavy (2023)
