= Jerkcurb =

English musician (born 1992)

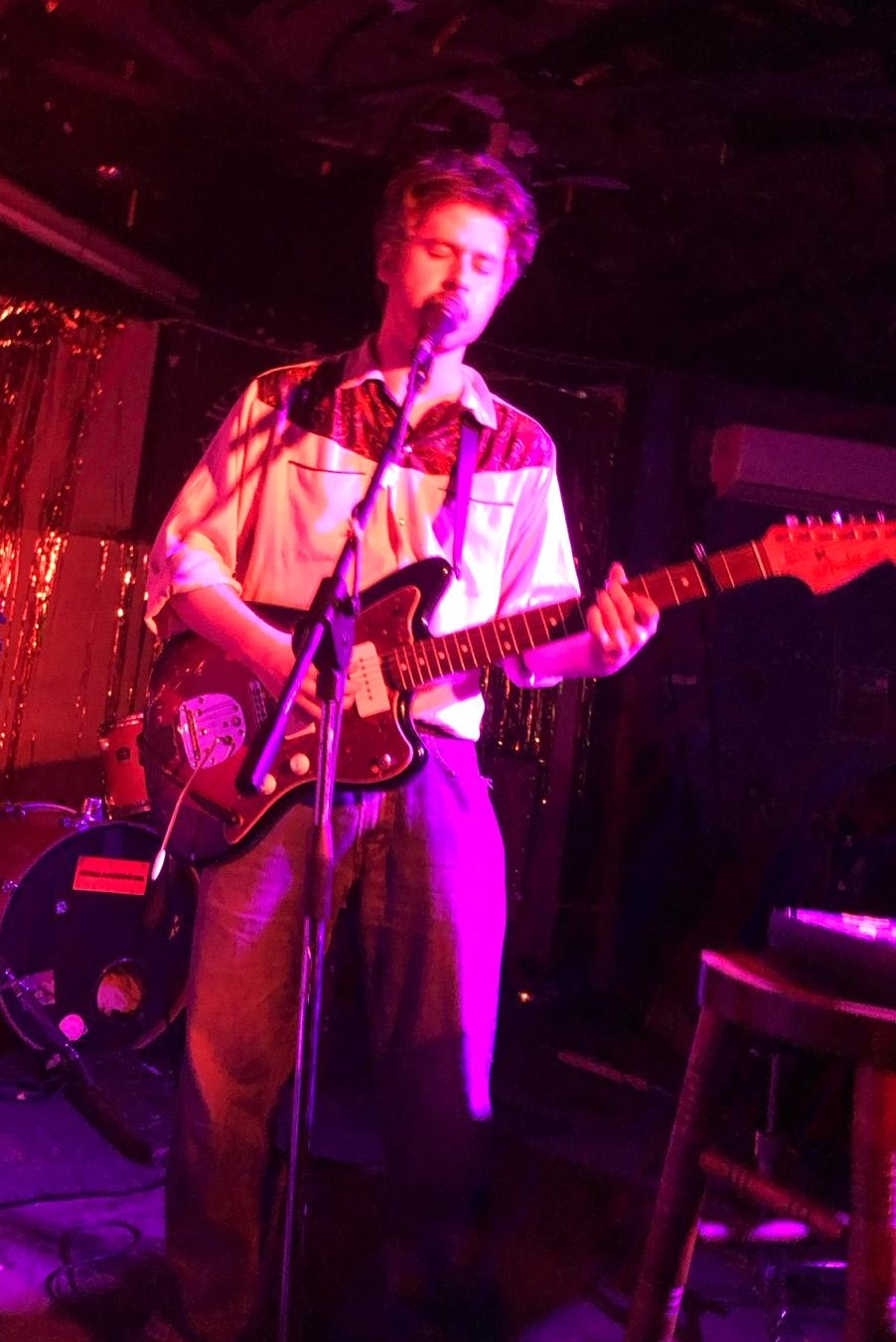
- Jerkcurb (2023)

Background information
- Born: Jacob Read; 27 February 1992 (age 34); Denmark Hill, South East London, England
- Genres: Alternative Rock, Indie Rock, Dream pop
- Instruments: vocals, guitar, bass, piano
- Years active: 2010–present
- Label: Handsome Dad Records
- Member of: Horsey, Findom

Jacob Read (born 1992) known professionally as Jerkcurb is an English musician, illustrator and animator.

== Biography ==
Jacob Read was born in 1992 in Denmark Hill, South East London, to artist parents, an American mother and English father. He is Ashkenazi Jewish through his mother but not practicing.

As well as being a musician, Read is an illustrator and animator, having studied at Kingston School of Art from 2011 to 2014. He has worked with the Tate Britain art gallery on two occasions, including being commissioned to create an animation for an exhibition on art in World War 1. His drawings have often been linked to his music as well as serving as the artwork for each of his musical releases.

In 2022 Read collaborated with Danish fashion label Wood Wood to design a clothing line.

Read is a childhood friend and neighbour of London musician Archie Marshall, better known as King Krule. Marshall shouted out Read's name in the live release of his song 'Rock Bottom' released in 2021. He began the song with the words: "This next song is dedicated to a Mr. Jacob Read".

== Music career ==
Read has performed as a solo artist, under his stage name Jerkcurb, and as a member of several bands, including Horsey and Findom.

=== Solo career ===
Read first released a version of 'Shadowshow', which would later appear on his debut album 'Air Con Eden', on SoundCloud and Bandcamp under the name Jerkcurb in 2010. He continued to release home recorded music until 2012. He was subsequently signed to Handsome Dad Records. He has since continued to perform under the Jerkcurb moniker.

Jerkcurb's first official release came in 2016 with the release of the single, 'Night on Earth'. The single featured 'Midnight Snack' as a B-Side and was his first to be released through Handsome Dad records. 'Night on Earth' charted for 3 weeks, peaking at 35 in the Official Charts physical single chart. 'Night on Earth' has amassed over ten million streams on Spotify.

He followed up with the single Voodoo Saloon in 2017. Voodoo Saloon also charted, peaking at 43.

In 2019, Jerkcurb released his debut album, Air Con Eden. The mostly self produced album also featured production work from Pulp bassist Steve Mackey as well as Kendrick Lamar producer Tom Carmichael. The album received acclaim from various critics. At Metacritic, which aggregates ratings from critics, Air Con Eden has a score of 80 indicating "generally favourable reviews" Following the release of the album, Jerkcurb completed a tour of the UK.

Jerkcurb's cited influences include 1950s Exotica, Tom Waits, Roy Orbison, Delia Derbyshire and Grouper.

Jerkcurb has also frequently provided support for King Krule, including as part of his 2023 world tour.

On November 28, 2025, Jerkcurb released his second studio album, Night Fishing on a Calm Lake. The album marked the return of Jerkcurb after a six-year hiatus. Three singles, “Larchmont”, “Death Valley Morning Dew” and "Hungry" were released to promote the record. He embarked on a UK tour, following the album's release, in January 2026. The tour featured support from LL Burns and Sarah Meth.

=== With Horsey ===
In 2016 Jacob Read formed the band Horsey alongside Jack Marshall, fellow artist-musician and brother of musician Archie Marshall, Theo McCabe and George Bass. George Bass would later play drums on Jerkcurb's debut album. The band is a reformation of two previous bands, Words Backwards (2008–2010) and Dik Ooz.

The band released their debut album, 'Debonair', in 2021. The single 'Seahorse' from the album peaked at 69 in the physical singles chart and featured King Krule.

== Discography ==
=== Solo work ===
Studio Albums

- Air Con Eden (2019)
- Night Fishing On A Calm Lake (2025)

Singles

- Night On Earth (2016)
- Voodoo Saloon/Little Boring Thing (2017)
- Somerton Beach (2017)
- Timelapse Tulip (2019)
- Air Con Eden (2019)
- Devils Catflap (2019)
- Larchmont (2025)
- Death Valley Morning Dew (2025)
- Hungry (2025)

=== With Horsey ===
Studio Albums

- Debonair (2021, Untitled Recs)

Singles

- Everyone's Tongue (2017)
- Park Outside Your Mother's House (2017)
- Bread & Butter (2019)
- Sippy Cup (2020)
- Seahorse (2021)
- Lagoon (2021)
