= King Krule (EP) =

EP by King Krule
- Released: 8 November 2011
- Genre: Indie rock, electronic
- Length: 12:36
- Label: True Panther

King Krule chronology
King Krule (2011)	6 Feet Beneath the Moon (2013)

King Krule is the first EP by King Krule, released on 8 November 2011.

== Reception ==
Professional ratings
Aggregate scores
Source	Rating
Metacritic	(73/100)
Review scores
Source	Rating
The A.V. Club	B
Beats Per Minute	71%
Pitchfork	8.0/10
Rolling Stone	3/5 stars

On Metacritic, the EP has received an average review score of 73/100, indicating "generally favorable" reviews.

== Track listing ==
No.	Title	Length
1.	"363N63"	2:01
2.	"Bleak Bake"	2:30
3.	"Portrait in Black and Blue"	2:53
4.	"Lead Existence"	1:11
5.	"The Noose of Jah City"	4:01
