= 6 Feet Beneath the Moon =

Studio album by King Krule
- Released: 24 August 2013
- Genres: Indie rock; post-punk; jazz fusion; trip hop
- Length: 52:26
- Labels: True Panther; XL
- Producers: Archy Marshall; Rodaidh McDonald

King Krule chronology
King Krule (2011)	6 Feet Beneath the Moon (2013)	A New Place 2 Drown (2015)

Singles from 6 Feet Beneath the Moon
- 1. "Easy Easy" Released: 15 July 2013; 2. "Neptune Estate" Released: 21 October 2013; 3. "A Lizard State" Released: 13 January 2014

Professional ratings
Aggregate scores
Source	Rating
AnyDecentMusic?	7.4/10
Metacritic	77/100
Review scores
Source	Rating
AllMusic	4/5 stars
Exclaim!	9/10
The Guardian	3/5 stars
Mojo	4/5 stars
NME	8/10
The Observer	4/5 stars
Pitchfork	7.3/10
Q	4/5 stars
Rolling Stone	3.5/5 stars
Spin	7/10

6 Feet Beneath the Moon is the debut studio album by English singer-songwriter Archy Marshall under the stage name King Krule. It was released on 24 August 2013, Marshall's nineteenth birthday, via True Panther Sounds and XL Recordings.

== Release and promotion ==
6 Feet Beneath the Moon was released in North America by True Panther Sounds and in the rest of the world by XL Recordings. Zane Lowe of BBC Radio 1 premiered "Neptune Estate" on his show on 12 August 2013. On 14 August, the album was made available to stream in full on King Krule's website, with live CCTV footage of various London streets accompanying each track.

== Track listing ==
All tracks are written by Archy Marshall.

No.	Title	Length
1.	"Easy Easy"	2:50
2.	"Border Line"	3:06
3.	"Has This Hit?"	4:26
4.	"Foreign 2"	3:39
5.	"Ceiling"	2:56
6.	"Baby Blue"	3:36
7.	"Cementality"	3:44
8.	"A Lizard State"	4:20
9.	"Will I Come"	1:55
10.	"Ocean Bed"	3:31
11.	"Neptune Estate"	5:13
12.	"The Krockadile"	4:52
13.	"Out Getting Ribs"	4:16
14.	"Bathed in Grey"	4:02
Total length:		52:26

Japanese edition bonus track
No.	Title	Length
15.	"Little Wild"	3:40
Total length:		56:06

Sample credits

- "Will I Come" contains samples from The Wicker Man.
- "Bathed in Grey" contains elements and samples from "What Is There to Say", written by E. Y. Harburg and Vernon Duke and performed by Bill Evans.

== Personnel ==
- Archy Marshall – performance, production
- Rodaidh McDonald – production, mixing, engineering
- Andy Ramsay – engineering (tracks 1, 3, 5–8, 10–14)
- Desmond Lambert – engineering (track 5)
- Jack Marshall – illustration
- Reuben Bastienne-Lewis – photography

== Charts ==
Chart (2013)	Peak position
Belgian Albums (Ultratop Flanders)	86
Belgian Albums (Ultratop Wallonia)	65
French Albums (SNEP)	182
Danish Albums (Hitlisten)	19
German Albums (Offizielle Top 100)	100
Swedish Albums (Sverigetopplistan)	60
UK Albums (Official Charts)	65
UK Independent Albums (Official Charts)	12
US Billboard 200	187
US Heatseekers Albums (Billboard)	4
US Independent Albums (Billboard)	37
