= Lucid (Raveena album) =

2019 debut studio album by Raveena

Studio album by Raveena
- Released: May 31, 2019
- Genres: R&B; neo soul
- Length: 44:34
- Label: Empire
- Producer: Everett Orr

Raveena chronology
Shanti (2017)	Lucid (2019)	Moonstone (2020)

Lucid is the debut studio album by American singer-songwriter Raveena, released independently on May 31, 2019, and distributed through Empire Distribution. The album was executive produced by Everett Orr, Raveena's longtime collaborator, and was preceded by the singles "Mama" and "Stronger".

== Background and recording ==
Raveena began working with producer Everett Orr in 2015, after moving to New York at age 17 and searching for a sound with a series of producers and songwriters. Orr came from a hip-hop background, having worked with artists such as Yo Gotti and DJ Khaled, and frequently built his beats from soul samples.

The pair developed the album's sound over several years, drawing on influences including D'Angelo, Minnie Riperton and Stevie Wonder, with the stated aim of creating a cohesive musical universe listeners could escape into. Lyrically, the album addresses Raveena's recovery from past abusive relationships, examining their effects on her mental health on "Stronger" and her physical space on "Salt Water".

== Release and promotion ==
The single "Mama", a tribute to immigrant mothers based on Raveena's personal experiences, was released in early May 2019. It was followed on May 16, 2019, by "Stronger", released alongside the announcement of the album, its track list and its release date. Raveena said the concept for "Stronger" came to her during an acid trip, and the song marked a shift from her signature falsetto into a lower vocal register.

The album was released on May 31, 2019, and features a guest appearance from British singer Hope Tala on the track "Floating".

== Critical reception ==
Lucid received critical acclaim on release, and reviewers highlighted its dreamy, atmospheric production and Raveena's vocal performance.

== Track listing ==
All tracks are written by Raveena.

Lucid track listing
No.	Title	Length
1.	"Hypnosis"
2.	"Nectar"
3.	"Stronger"
4.	"Salt Water"
5.	"Stone"
6.	"Stone (Reprise)"
7.	"Mama"
8.	"Bloom"
9.	"Floating" (featuring Hope Tala)
10.	"Still Dreaming"
11.	"Nani's Interlude"
12.	"Petal"
Total length:		44:34

== Personnel ==
- Raveena – vocals, songwriting
- Everett Orr – executive production
