= King Krule =

English singer-songwriter, musician, and producer

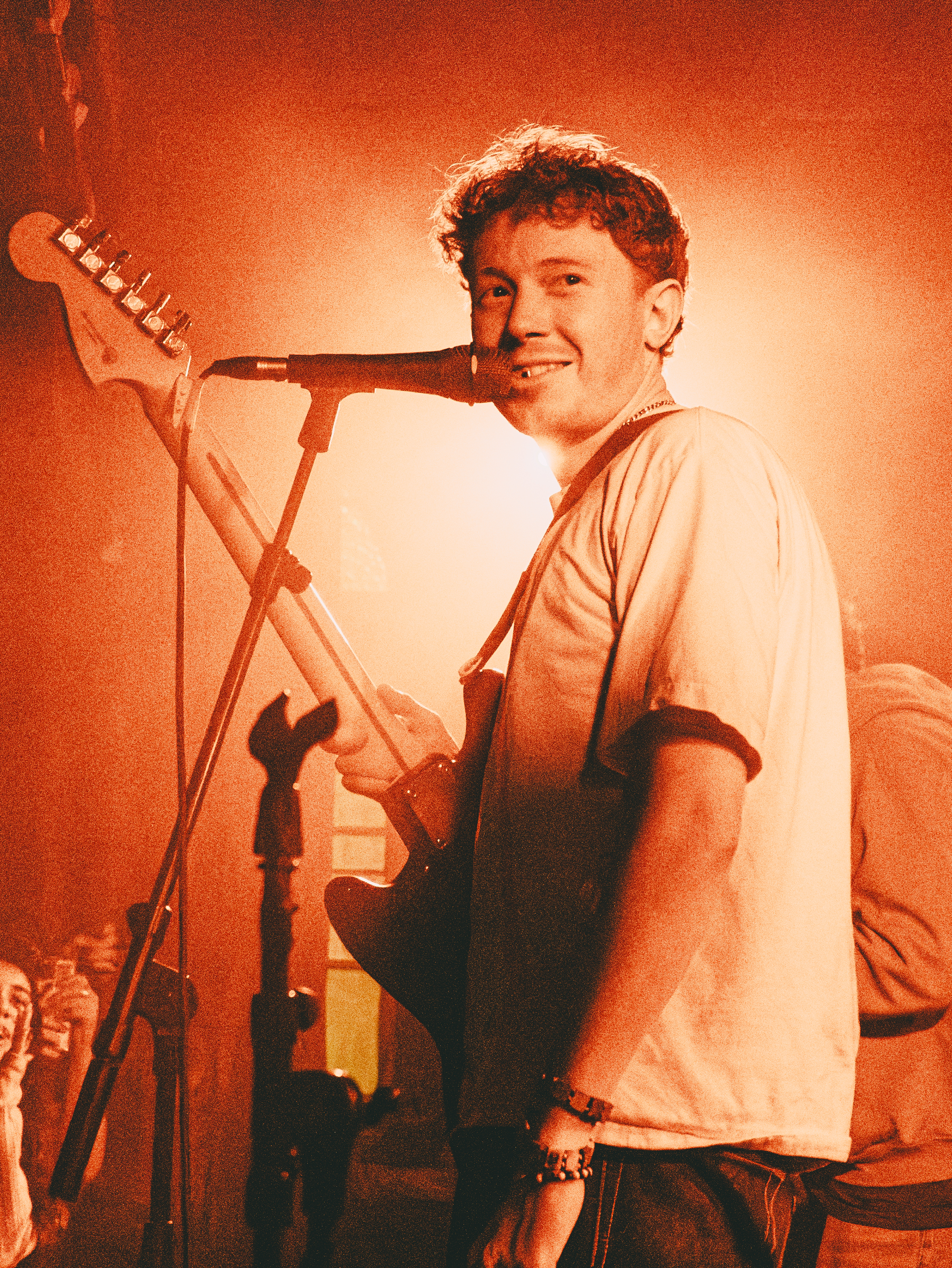
- Marshall performing at the George Tavern in 2025

Background information
- Also known as: Zoo Kid; DJ JD Sports; Edgar the Beatmaker; Edgar the Breathtaker; Lankslacks; The Oozemaster; The Return of Pimp Shrimp
- Born: Archy Ivan Marshall; 24 August 1994 (age 32); Southwark, London, England
- Genres: Indie rock; jazz fusion; post-punk; hip hop; electronic; avant-rock; trip hop
- Occupations: Singer; songwriter; musician; rapper; record producer
- Instruments: Vocals; guitar; keyboards; drums; bass; sampler
- Years active: 2010–present
- Labels: True Panther; XL; Rinse
- Website: kingkrule.net

Archy Ivan Marshall (born 24 August 1994), also known by his stage name King Krule, among other names, is an English singer, songwriter, musician, rapper and record producer.

He began recording music in 2010, releasing it under the moniker Zoo Kid; the following year, he adopted his present stage name. His debut full-length album, 6 Feet Beneath the Moon, was released in 2013 to positive critical reception. His second album, A New Place 2 Drown, released under his birth name, was released in 2015. His third and fourth albums, The Ooz and Man Alive!, were released in 2017 and 2020 respectively, both to further critical acclaim. He released his fifth and most recent album, Space Heavy, in 2023.

His music blends elements of punk jazz with hip hop, darkwave, trip hop and post-punk.

== Early life ==
Archy Marshall was born to Rachel Howard and Adam Marshall in Southwark, London. He has family in the Czech Republic. During an interview with The Guardian's Rob Fitzpatrick, Marshall said that from a young age, he experienced discipline issues and refused to go to school. Throughout his childhood, he spent much of his time between his father's house in Peckham and his mother's house in East Dulwich; his mother was much less strict than his father, who had many rules. Marshall recalls that his father had to physically carry him to school, otherwise he would skip and hide in his room. Once he turned 13 years old, he was given a private house tutor. He was later accepted into the Brit School to study art, where he struggled with discipline initially, but soon found his place.

Marshall is a childhood friend and neighbour of South London musician Jacob Read, better known as Jerkcurb.

Marshall has said that he was tested for several mental health conditions at London's Maudsley Hospital. He claims that the tests took a toll on him; that the doctors, counsellors and psychiatrists were wrong most of the time; that he hated everybody; and that he would hide in his room for hours on end. He refers to his mental health issues, such as depression and insomnia, in some of his lyrics.

During an interview with NPR, Marshall recalled that he often created art in many different media, as his parents encouraged creativity throughout his childhood. He noted that visual art in particular is important to him, and he mentioned that he carefully crafts his music videos and album art such that they reflect his particular aesthetic sensibility.

== Career ==
=== Early career as Zoo Kid (2008–2011) ===
During Marshall's years at Forest Hill School and at the Brit School alongside long-time collaborator Jamie Isaac between 2008 and 2011, he released two singles and an EP under the name Zoo Kid. Marshall's most noteworthy release under the Zoo Kid alias was a 2010 EP titled U.F.O.W.A.V.E.

=== King Krule EP and 6 Feet Beneath the Moon (2011–2015) ===
In July 2011, Marshall began playing under a new moniker, King Krule, at a festival in Hyères, France. Later that year in November, he released his eponymous debut EP. Contrary to some reports, his stage name is not inspired by the character of King K. Rool from the Donkey Kong Country video game series, but rather by the Elvis Presley film King Creole.

On 9 December 2012, the BBC announced that he had been nominated for the Sound of 2013 poll.

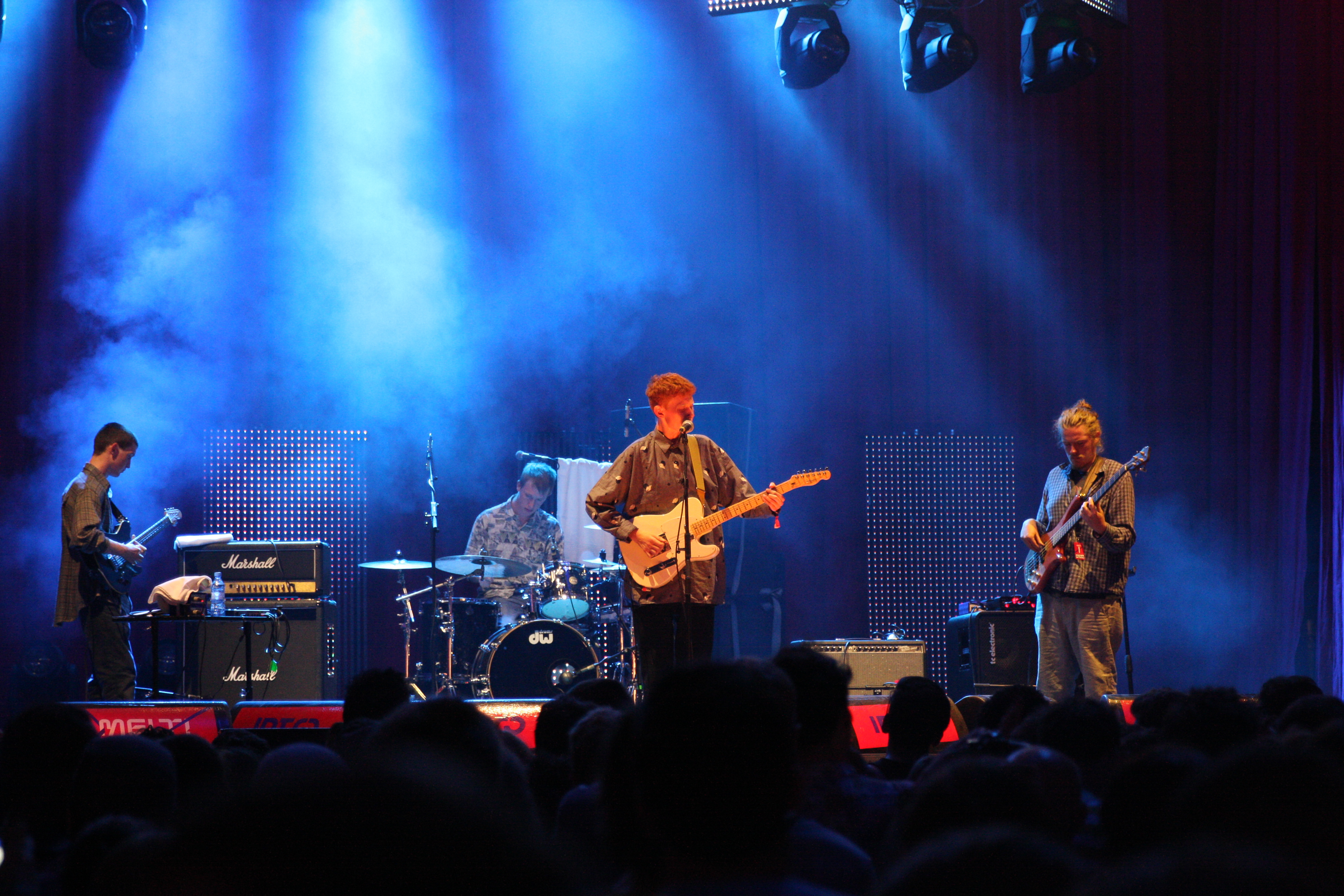
King Krule performing at Melt! Festival 2013

On 24 August 2013, Marshall released his debut album, 6 Feet Beneath the Moon, featuring an album cover illustrated by his brother, Jack Marshall. At the time of release, more than half of the tracks had already been released on various EPs. This brought him to prominence, especially in the US, having performed televised sets on both Conan and the Late Show with David Letterman. In January 2014, he eventually released a music video for 'A Lizard State', the third single on the album. The following month, Marshall appeared on the cover of The Fader for its 90th issue.

=== A New Place 2 Drown (2015–2017) ===
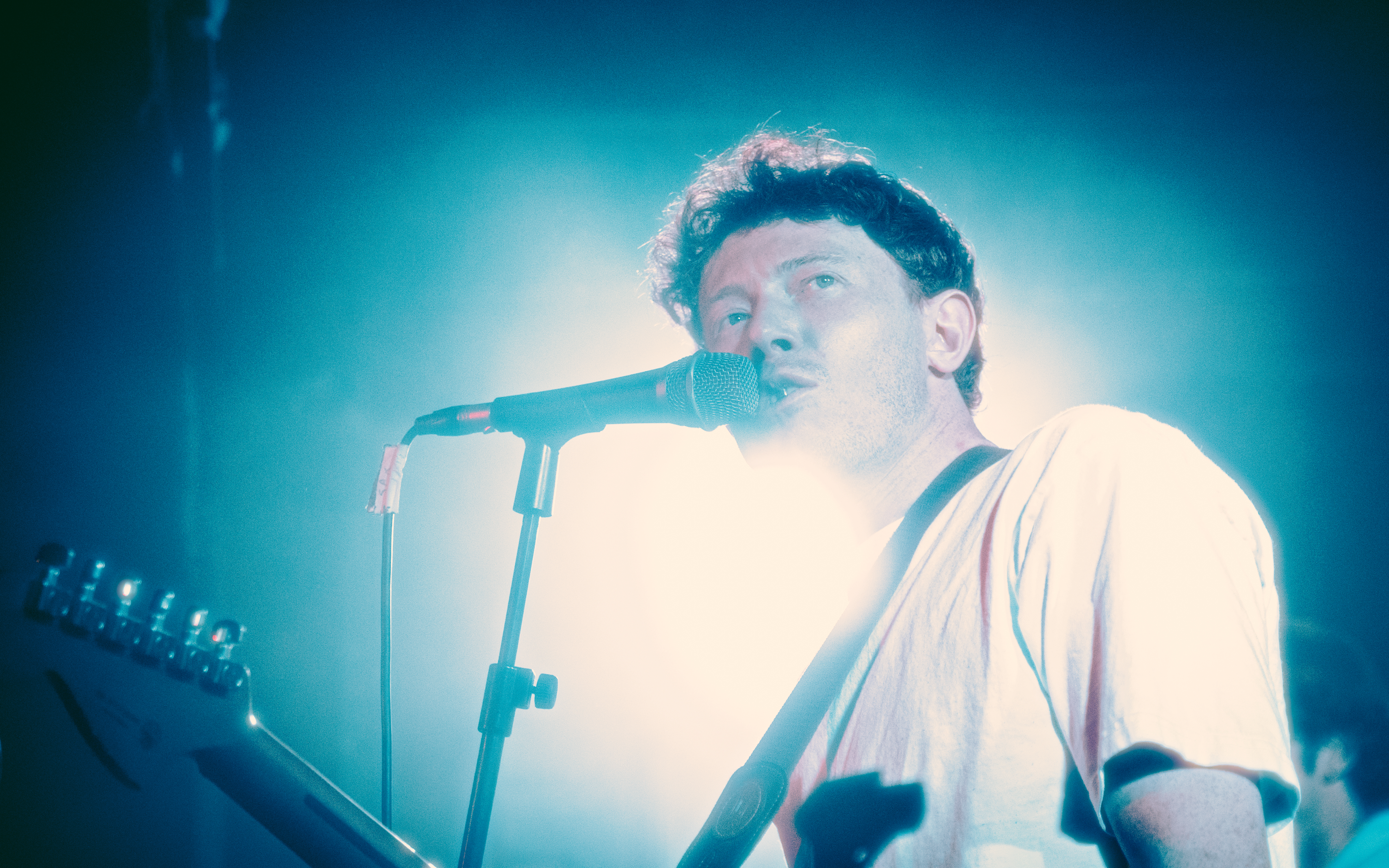
Marshall at the George Tavern in 2025

On 10 December 2015, Marshall released an album titled A New Place 2 Drown under his real name, Archy Marshall. He partnered again with his brother Jack to release a 208-page book of visual art and text as well as a ten-minute documentary. In an interview with NPR, Marshall said that he wanted the album to have a physical component, quoting himself and his brother Jack as "[being] fascinated by stimulating the eyes and ears together". He released the album under his real name rather than King Krule to differentiate it stylistically, as he claims that he thought of A New Place 2 Drown as a hip hop album rather than the dark alternative/jazz sound of 6 Feet Beneath the Moon.

=== The OOZ and Man Alive! (2017–2023) ===
In April 2017, Marshall played two unreleased songs under the name Edgar the Beatmaker on an NTS Radio show hosted by Mount Kimbie, a group with which Marshall frequently collaborates. Months later in August, Marshall released a new single titled "Czech One"; it was the first King Krule release since 2013. The following month, Marshall released a second single titled "Dum Surfer". On 13 October, Marshall released The Ooz, his second album as King Krule. The album received positive reviews, and was ranked the #83 most discussed album of 2017 and the 75th most shared album of 2017 according to Metacritic. The album also peaked at #23 on the UK Official Chart albums ranking. Pitchfork named the album the best rock album of 2017 and the third best album overall of 2017. It was nominated for IMPALA's European Album of the Year Award.

On 8 March 2018, a live performance of songs from The Ooz, titled Live on the Moon, was uploaded to Marshall's YouTube channel. This performance, directed by Ja Humby, consisted of 8 songs and features Marshall performing dressed as an astronaut on the moon. The performance was later released on vinyl in November 2018.

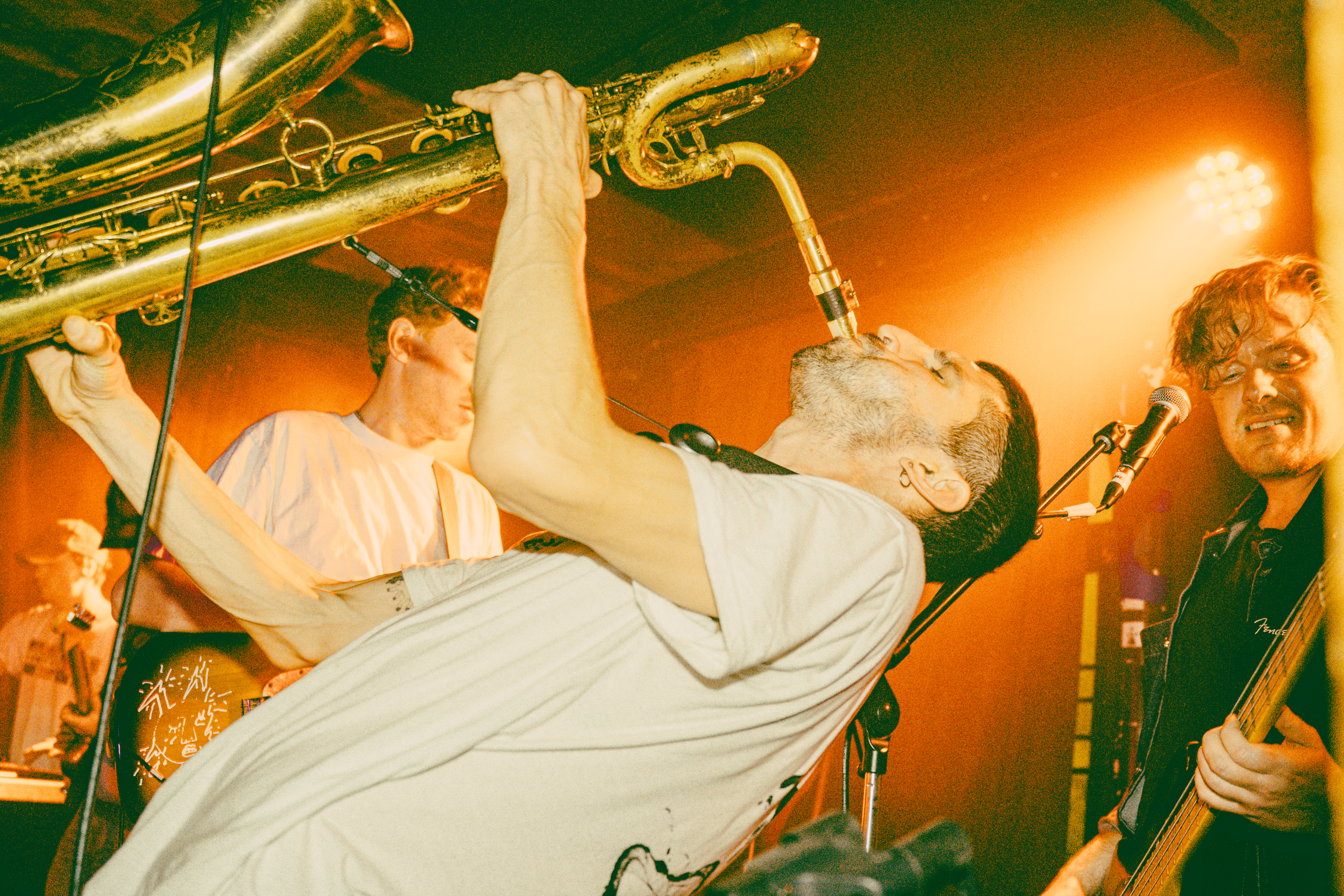
Marshall performing with Ignacio Salvadores at the George Tavern in 2025

On 19 November 2019, Marshall uploaded a video titled "Hey World!" on his Youtube channel. This video is an analog video recording of live acoustic performances of 4 songs from his upcoming album, directed by Charlotte Patmore. On 14 January 2020, Marshall announced the third King Krule album, Man Alive!, and released the single "(Don't Let the Dragon) Draag On" on the same day. The single "Alone, Omen 3" followed on 5 February. Days before the album's release, he released the final single, "Cellular", along with an animated music video, directed by Jamie Wolfe. The album was released on 21 February 2020.

On 10 September 2021, Marshall released a live album titled You Heat Me Up, You Cool Me Down, featuring a variety of songs across his discography.

On 1 January 2023, the "Hey World!" video was given a wider release on streaming platforms as an EP.

=== Space Heavy (2023–present) ===
On 13 April 2023, Marshall released a single titled "Seaforth", touching on his fascination with "the space between, space haunted by dreams of love, touching a narrative of lost connection, losing people and situations to the guillotine of the universe". Just under two months later, Marshall released the album Space Heavy on 9 June.

On 20 June 2024, Marshall released the EP SHHHHHHH!, along with a self-directed music video for the song "Time for Slurp".

In March 2026, King Krule released the track "The 343 Loop" on Help(2), a charity album commissioned by the charity organization War Child. The recording sessions with various artists featured on the album, produced by James Ford, took place in November 2025 in Abbey Road Studios.

== Musical style and influences ==
Many reviewers and journalists have noted King Krule's unusual transcendence and appropriation of disparate genres. His music has been described mainly with jazz derivatives such as punk jazz, jazz fusion, darkwave, post-punk and hip hop. Writers have also noted elements of trip hop, jazz rap and dub in some of his songs. Jason Lymangrover of Allmusic states that his songs are mainly in the form of ballads with major seventh chords, but by contrast there is also a "grittiness" to Archy's voice and persona, portraying him as "the type of kid who would be quick to throw a punch without asking questions".

His music has been likened to Morrissey and Edwyn Collins. He is inspired by disparate influences such as Elvis Presley, Gene Vincent, Josef K, Chet Baker, Fela Kuti, J Dilla, Billy Bragg, Aztec Camera (his godfather is the band's former drummer, Dave Ruffy) and The Penguin Cafe Orchestra. Marshall said in an interview with The Guardian that he began his musical career with the influence of Pixies and The Libertines.

Marshall's lyrics, according to a Flaunt magazine interview, generally consist of themes of romance, sex, aggression, conflict, and depression. These themes link to his literary influences, in which Marshall further elaborated: "Literature, poems, songs are all very similar[.] I used to read lots of poetry and sit there for ages trying to decipher the meaning, or work out the narration behind it all, then I found my own form of that. [...] you can see how their metaphors develop and understand their uses. So really, I learnt to do that for myself".

== Personal life ==
Marshall has a daughter, born in 2019, with English photographer Charlotte Patmore. Patmore has collaborated with Marshall on photography and videography projects over several years, and has been involved with several of his music videos, including the video for the song "Cadet Limbo", which Patmore directed in 2017, and Hey World!, a video preceding the release of Marshall's album Man Alive!.

On 20 August 2026, he married Sophie McAlister.

== Live band ==
- Archy Marshall – vocals, guitar, keyboards
- James Wilson – bass, vocals
- George Bass – drums
- Jack Towell – guitar
- Ben Hauke – keyboards, SFX
- Ignacio Salvadores – saxophone

== Discography ==
=== Studio albums ===
Album	Details	Peak positions						
Album	Details	UK	AUS	DEN	FRA	GER	SWE	US
6 Feet Beneath the Moon	Released: 26 August 2013; Label: XL Recordings / True Panther Records; Formats: CD, LP, digital download, cassette	65	—	19	182	100	60	187
A New Place 2 Drown (as Archy Marshall)	Released: 10 December 2015; Label: XL Recordings / True Panther Records; Formats: CD, LP, digital download, cassette	—	—	—	—	—	—	—
The Ooz	Released: 13 October 2017; Label: XL Recordings / True Panther Records; Formats: CD, LP, digital download, cassette	23	51	—	124	—	—	114
Man Alive!	Released: 21 February 2020; Label: XL / True Panther Records / Matador Records; Formats: CD, LP, digital download, cassette	12	35	—	121	42	—	84
Space Heavy	Released: 9 June 2023; Label: XL Recordings; Formats: CD, LP, digital download, cassette	18	—	—	191	—	—	— (Note: Space Heavy did not enter the Billboard 200, but peaked at number 42 on the Top Album Sales chart.)

=== EPs ===
- 2010: U.F.O.W.A.V.E. (self-released; as Zoo Kid)
- 2011: King Krule (True Panther Records)
- 2023: Aqrxvst Is The Band’s Name (self-released; as Aqrxvst, with Pretty V and Jadasea)
- 2024: SHHHHHHH! (XL Recordings / Matador Records)

=== Live albums ===
- 2018: Live on the Moon (XL Recordings / True Panther Records / Matador Records)
- 2021: You Heat Me Up, You Cool Me Down (XL / True Panther Records / Matador Records)

=== Singles ===
- 2010: Out Getting Ribs / Has This Hit (House Anxiety Records; as Zoo Kid)
- 2011: Portrait in Black and Blue (True Panther Records)
- 2011: The Noose of Jah City (True Panther Records)
- 2012: Rock Bottom / Octopus (Rinse Recordings)
- 2013: Easy Easy (XL Recordings)
- 2013: Neptune Estate (XL Recordings)
- 2014: A Lizard State (XL Recordings)
- 2017: Czech One (XL Recordings / True Panther Records)
- 2017: Dum Surfer (XL Recordings / True Panther Records)
- 2017: Half Man Half Shark (XL Recordings)
- 2019: Hey World! (XL Recordings)
- 2020: (Don't Let the Dragon) Draag On (XL Recordings / True Panther Records)
- 2020: Alone, Omen 3 (XL Recordings / True Panther Records)
- 2020: Cellular (XL Recordings / True Panther Records)
- 2021: Imagine (self-released)
- 2021: Jealous (King Krule Nothing Special Remix) (with Eyedress) (Lex Records)
- 2021: Seahorse (with Horsey) (Untitled Records)
- 2022: midnight sun - king krule remix (with Nilüfer Yanya) (ATO Records)
- 2023: Seaforth (XL Recordings)
- 2023: If Only It Was Warmth (XL Recordings)
- 2023: Flimsier (XL Recordings)
- 2024: Empty And Silent (with Mount Kimbie) (Warp Records)
- 2025: Tropical Storm (with Tara Lily) (Tru Thoughts)
- 2025: When And Why (XL Recordings)

=== Other ===
- 2014: City Rivims Mk 1 (self-released; w/ Sub Luna City)

=== Guest appearances ===
Guest appearances, showing year released and album name
Title	Year	Artist(s)	Album
"You Took Your Time"	2013	Mount Kimbie	Cold Spring Fault Less Youth
"Meter, Pale, Tone"	2013	Mount Kimbie	Cold Spring Fault Less Youth
"So Sick Stories"	2014	Ratking	So It Goes
"Stackin' Skins"	2014	Trash Talk, Wiki	No Peace
"Blue Train Lines"	2017	Mount Kimbie	Love What Survives
"Turtle Neck Man"	2018	Mount Kimbie	Non-album single
"Seahorse"	2021	Horsey	Debonair
"Empty and Silent"	2024	Mount Kimbie	The Sunset Violent
"Boxing"	2024	Mount Kimbie	The Sunset Violent
"The 343

== Awards and nominations ==
Year	Organisation	Award	Work	Result
2012	BBC Sound of 2013	Sound of 2013	Himself	Nominated
2017	IMPALA	European Independent Album of the Year	The Ooz	Nominated
2018	Hyundai	Mercury Prize	The Ooz	Nominated
