= The Prodigy discography =

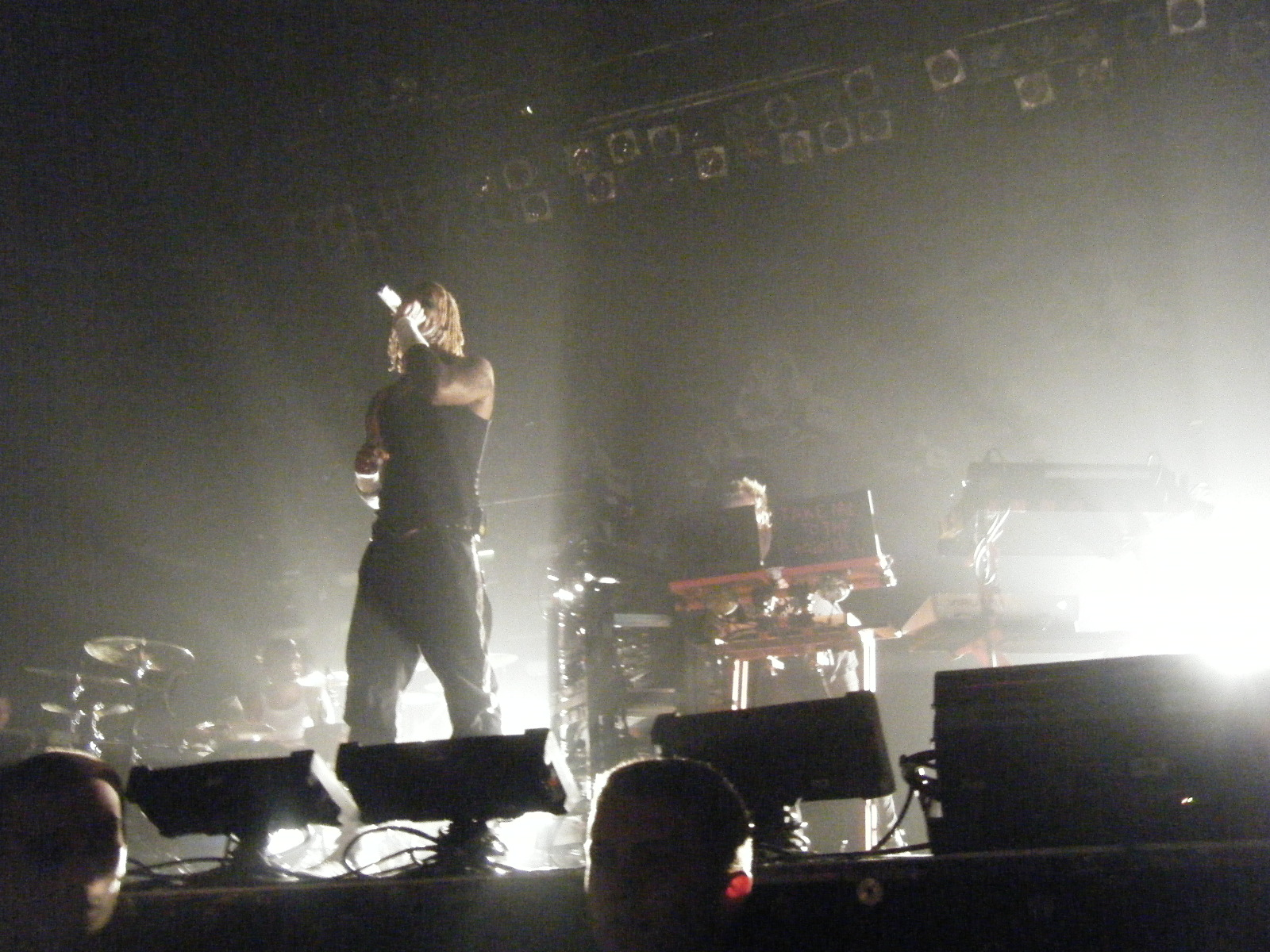
- Maxim performing at the Electric Factory in Philadelphia with Liam Howlett in back and Keith Flint out of the shot.
- Studio albums: 7
- Extended plays: 6
- Live albums: 1
- Compilation albums: 1
- Singles: 30
- Video albums: 3
- Music videos: 28
- Mix albums: 2

English electronic music group the Prodigy has released seven studio albums, one live album, one compilation album, one mix album, three extended plays, twenty-one singles, and twenty-two music videos. Hailed as pioneers of genres such as rave, techno, and big beat, the group have sold over 20 million albums worldwide. As of 9 November 2018 their UK album sales stood at 4,707,982.

The Prodigy's first release was the 1991 EP What Evil Lurks. Experience, the group's debut studio album, was released in September 1992, peaking at number 12 in the United Kingdom and certified platinum by the British Phonographic Industry (BPI). Experience spawned the singles "Charly", "Everybody in the Place", "Fire" / "Jericho", "Out of Space" and "Wind It Up (Rewound)", all of which were top 12 hits in the United Kingdom. Music for the Jilted Generation, the group's second studio album, was released in July 1994. The album peaked at number one in the UK, also reaching the top ten in countries such as Australia and New Zealand. Earning a platinum certification from the BPI, Music for the Jilted Generation spawned the UK top ten singles "One Love" and "No Good (Start the Dance)".

The Prodigy's third studio album The Fat of the Land was released in June 1997, becoming a huge commercial success. The album peaked at number one in multiple countries, including the United Kingdom and the United States. The Fat of the Land received multi-platinum certifications from the BPI, the Australian Recording Industry Association (ARIA), and the Recording Industry Association of America (RIAA). "Firestarter", the album's first single, peaked at number one in the United Kingdom and hit the top ten in multiple other countries. It also gave the group their biggest hit in the United States, where it peaked at number 30 on the Billboard Hot 100 and was certified gold by the RIAA. The album's second single "Breathe" also performed well commercially, reaching the top ten in multiple countries and becoming the group's second consecutive UK number-one hit. "Smack My Bitch Up", the album's final single, peaked at number 8 in the UK.

The group released their fourth studio album Always Outnumbered, Never Outgunned in August 2004. Their style had changed from rave and breakbeat to more of an electronic rock style. The album topped the charts in the United Kingdom, earning a silver certification from the BPI. Always Outnumbered, Never Outgunned spawned three singles, including the UK top 20 hit "Girls". Invaders Must Die, the group's fifth studio album, was released in February 2009. The album became the band's fourth consecutive studio album to top the charts in the UK. Among its four singles were the UK top ten hits "Omen" and "Warrior's Dance", both of which received silver certifications from the BPI.

"Firestarter" re-entered the UK and US charts in March 2019 following the death of band member Keith Flint.

== Albums ==
=== Studio albums ===
List of studio albums, with selected chart positions, sales figures and certifications
Title	Album details	Peak chart positions										Sales	Certifications
Title	Album details	UK	AUS	AUT	BEL	FIN	GER	IRL	NLD	NOR	US	Sales	Certifications
Experience	Released: 28 September 1992; Label: XL; Formats: CD, CS, LP	12	163	—	—	39	75	—	20	—	—	UK: 377,196	BPI: Platinum
Music for the Jilted Generation	Released: 4 July 1994; Label: XL; Formats: CD, CS, LP	1	9	7	22	1	11	1	5	12	198	UK: 813,265; FIN: 20,830	BPI: 2× Platinum; ARIA: Platinum; IFPI FIN: Gold
The Fat of the Land	Released: 30 June 1997; Label: XL; Formats: CD, CS, LP	1	1	1	2	1	1	1	1	1	1	UK: 1,432,579; FIN: 42,426; US: 2,800,000	BPI: 5× Platinum; ARIA: 2× Platinum; BRMA: Platinum; BVMI: Gold; IFPI AUT: Gold; IFPI FIN: Platinum; NVPI: Platinum; RIAA: 2× Platinum
Always Outnumbered, Never Outgunned	Released: 11 August 2004; Label: XL; Formats: CD, LP, digital download	1	5	8	8	7	6	3	4	5	62	UK: 230,248; US: 85,000	BPI: Gold
Invaders Must Die	Released: 18 February 2009; Label: Take Me to the Hospital; Formats: CD, LP, digital download	1	3	5	4	9	3	3	3	10	58	World: 1,300,000; UK: 701,916; US: 64,000	BPI: 2× Platinum; ARIA: Gold; BVMI: Gold; IFPI AUT: Gold; NVPI: Gold
The Day Is My Enemy	Released: 30 March 2015; Label: Take Me to the Hospital; Formats: CD, LP, digital download	1	8	10	6	7	6	4	2	17	127	UK: 130,764	BPI: Gold
No Tourists	Released: 2 November 2018; Label: Take Me to the Hospital; Formats: CD, LP, cassette, digital download	1	19	15	30	7	6	18	21	—	— (Note: No Tourists did not enter the US Billboard 200, but peaked at number 73 on the US Top Album Sales chart.)	UK: 48,151	BPI: Silver
"—" denotes a recording that did not chart or was not released in that territory.

=== Live albums ===
List of live albums, with selected chart positions
Title	Album details	Peak chart positions								
Title	Album details	UK	AUT	BEL	FRA	GER	IRL	NLD	NOR	US Dance
World's on Fire	Released: 23 May 2011; Label: Take Me to the Hospital; Formats: CD+DVD, CD+Blu-ray, digital download	5	29	26	128	15	28	39	34	15

=== Compilation albums ===
List of compilation albums, with selected chart positions and certifications
Title	Album details	Peak chart positions										Sales	Certifications
Title	Album details	UK	AUS	AUT	BEL	FIN	GER	NLD	NOR	NZ	US Dance	Sales	Certifications
Their Law: The Singles 1990–2005	Released: 17 October 2005; Label: XL, Maverick; Formats: CD, LP, digital download	1	29	34	21	38	45	18	26	11	8	UK: 903,543	BPI: 4× Platinum

=== Mix albums ===
List of mix albums, with selected chart positions
Title	Album details	Peak chart positions				Notes
Title	Album details	FIN	NLD	SWE	US	Notes
The Dirtchamber Sessions Volume One	Released: 22 February 1999; Label: XL; Formats: CD, CS	24	34	35	136	
Back to Mine	Released: 30 January 2006; Label: Disco Mix Club (DMC); Formats: CD	—	—	—	—	Contains the otherwise unreleased song "Wake the Fuck Up"

== Extended plays ==
List of extended plays
Title	Extended play details
What Evil Lurks	Released: 25 February 1991; Label: XL; Formats: 12"; UK no. 118
Voodoo People	Released: 7 November 1995; Label: XL, Mute; Formats: CD
Lost Beats	Released: 18 February 2009; Label: Take Me to the Hospital; Formats: CD, digital download
The Added Fat EP	Released: 3 December 2012; Label: XL; Formats: CD, 12", digital download
HMV Exclusive Remix EP	Released: 30 March 2015; Label: Take Me to the Hospital; Formats: CD
The Night Is My Friend EP	Released: 31 July 2015; Label: Take Me to the Hospital; Formats: CD, 12", cassette, digital download

== Singles ==
List of singles, with selected chart positions and certifications, showing year released and album name
Title	Year	Peak chart positions										Sales	Certifications	Album
Title	Year	UK	AUS	AUT	BEL	FIN	GER	IRL	NLD	NOR	US	Sales	Certifications	Album
"Charly"	1991	3	161	—	—	—	—	9	—	—	—		BPI: Silver	Experience
"Everybody in the Place"	1991	2	125	—	—	—	—	2	65	—	—			Experience
"Fire" / "Jericho"	1992	11	138	—	—	—	—	15	—	—	—			Experience
"Out of Space"	1992	5	167	—	32	—	15	6	3	—	—		BPI: Platinum	Experience
"Wind It Up (Rewound)"	1993	11	—	—	—	—	—	6	37	—	—			Experience
"One Love"	1993	8	—	—	—	—	—	3	—	—	—			Music for the Jilted Generation
"No Good (Start the Dance)"	1994	4	45	6	7	1	4	3	3	7	—	UK: 358,559	BPI: Gold; BVMI: Gold	Music for the Jilted Generation
"Voodoo People"	1994	13	24	—	26	1	—	7	20	—	—			Music for the Jilted Generation
"Poison"	1995	15	64	—	—	1	—	3	—	5	—		BPI: Silver	Music for the Jilted Generation
"Firestarter"	1996	1	22	8	15	1	6	2	14	1	30	UK: 850,759; FIN: 6,452	BPI: 2× Platinum; IFPI FIN: Gold; RIAA: Gold	The Fat of the Land
"Breathe"	1996	1	2	6	2	1	8	1	10	1	—	UK: 977,374; FIN: 10,507	BPI: 2× Platinum; ARIA: 2× Platinum; BRMA: Gold; BVMI: Gold; IFPI FIN: Platinum	The Fat of the Land
"Smack My Bitch Up"	1997	8	41	—	57	1	51	6	22	8	89		BPI: Platinum	The Fat of the Land
"Baby's Got a Temper"	2002	5	36	35	65	7	37	14	39	13	—			Non-album single
"Girls"	2004	19	—	—	63	18	—	27	28	—	—			Always Outnumbered, Never Outgunned
"Hotride"	2004	—	—	—	—	—	—	40	—	—	—			Always Outnumbered, Never Outgunned
"Spitfire"	2005	107	—	—	—	—	—	—	—	—	—			Always Outnumbered, Never Outgunned
"Voodoo People" / "Out of Space"	2005	20	79	—	—	—	—	27	59	20	—		BPI: Gold	Their Law: The Singles 1990–2005
"Invaders Must Die"	2008	49	58	—	—	—	—	—	—	—	—		BPI: Gold	Invaders Must Die
"Omen"	2009	4	83	22	66	—	28	28	75	—	—	UK: 429,452	BPI: Platinum	Invaders Must Die
"Warrior's Dance"	2009	9	—	54	—	—	64	44	—	—	—		BPI: Gold	Invaders Must Die
"Take Me to the Hospital"	2009	38	—	—	—	—	—	—	—	—	—			Invaders Must Die
"Nasty"	2015	98	—	—	—	—	—	—	—	—	—			The Day Is My Enemy
"Wild Frontier"	2015	197	—	—	117	—	—	—	—	—	—			The Day Is My Enemy
"Wall of Death"	2015	—	—	—	—	—	—	—	—	—	—			The Day Is My Enemy
"Ibiza"	2015	— (Note: "Ibiza" did not enter the UK Singles Chart, but peaked at number 25 on the UK Physical Singles Chart.)	—	—	140	—	—	—	—	—	—			The Day Is My Enemy
"Need Some1"	2018	— (Note: "Need Some1" did not enter the UK Singles Chart, but peaked at number 91 on the UK Singles Sales Chart.)	—	—	—	—	—	—	—	—	—			No Tourists
"Light Up the Sky"	2018	—	—	—	—	—	—	—	—	—	—			No Tourists
"Fight Fire With Fire"	2018	—	—	—	—	—	—	—	—	—	—			No Tourists
"We Live Forever"	2018	—	—	—	—	—	—	—	—	—	—			No Tourists
"—" denotes a recording that did not chart or was not released in that territory.

=== Promotional singles ===
List of promotional singles, showing year released and album name
Title	Year	Peak chart positions	Album
Title	Year	UK	Album
"We Eat Rhythm"	1994	—	Select Magazine Future Tracks
"Mindfields"	1996	—	The Fat of the Land
"Serial Thrilla"	1997	—	The Fat of the Land
"Funky Shit"	1998	—	The Fat of the Land
"(You'll Be) Under My Wheels"	2004	—	Always Outnumbered, Never Outgunned
"Get Up Get Off"	2004	—	Always Outnumbered, Never Outgunned
"Thunder"	2009	—	Invaders Must Die
"Smack My Bitch Up" / "Breathe"	2012	—	The Added Fat EP
"The Day Is My Enemy"	2015	136	The Day Is My Enemy
"Rhythm Bomb"	2015	—	The Day Is My Enemy
"Get Your Fight On"	2015	—	The Day Is My Enemy

== Video albums ==
Title	Album details
Electronic Punks	Released: 10 July 1995; Label: XL; Formats: VHS
Their Law: The Singles 1990–2005	Released: 17 October 2005; Label: XL, Maverick; Formats: DVD
World's on Fire	Released: 23 May 2011; Label: Take Me to the Hospital; Formats: DVD, Blu-ray

== Music videos ==
List of music videos, showing year released and director
Title	Year	Director(s)
"Charly"	1991	Russell Curtis
"Everybody in the Place"	1991	Russell Curtis
"Fire"	1992	Russell Curtis
"Out of Space"	1992	Russell Curtis
"Wind It Up (Rewound)"	1993	Russell Curtis
"One Love"	1993	Hyperbolic Systems
"No Good (Start the Dance)"	1994	Walter Stern
"Voodoo People"	1994	Walter Stern
"Poison"	1995	Walter Stern
"Firestarter"	1996	Walter Stern
"Breathe"	1996	Walter Stern
"Smack My Bitch Up"	1997	Jonas Åkerlund
"Baby's Got a Temper"	2002	Traktor
"Girls"	2004	Mat Cook, Julian House
"Hotride"	2004	Daniel Levi
"Spitfire"	2005	Tim Qualtrough
"Voodoo People" (Pendulum Remix)	2005	Ron Scalpello
"Invaders Must Die"	2008	Cordelia Plunket
"Omen"	2009	Paul Dugdale
"Warrior's Dance"	2009	Corin Hardy
"Take Me to the Hospital"	2009	Paul Dugdale
"Run with the Wolves"	2010	Rob Wicksteed
"Nasty"	2015	Oliver Jones
"Wild Frontier"	2015	Mascha Halberstad
"Ibiza"	2015	Roger Sargent
"Get Your Fight On"	2015	Bartleberry Logan
"Need Some1"	2018	Paco Raterta
"Timebomb Zone"	2018	Paco Raterta
