= Genaside II =

- Also known as: GII
- Origin: Brixton, London, England
- Genres: British hip hop; breakbeat hardcore; jungle; big beat; trip hop
- Years active: 1989–1991; 1995–2002
- Labels: Jumpin' & Pumpin'; SW Nine; Hardcore Urban Music; Internal; Durban Poison; Copasetik
- Past members: Kris Bonez; Chilly Phats; Fragile Scotty; Jaz; James Da Shit; Killerman Archer

Genaside II were a British musical group active from 1989 to 2002 from the Brixton area of London, with a musical style spanning breakbeat hardcore, jungle, hip-hop, big beat, and trip hop. The band had a varying line-up, with the duo of Kris Bonez and Chilly Phatz at its core.

They are best known for their influential 1991 single "Narra Mine", which made use of soulful female vocals, raw MCing, and Hardnoise's drum samples from "Mice in the Presence of the Lion". The single was a success in the hardcore scene, and a seminal contribution to the darker and heavier sound that preceded jungle and drum and bass. Their contemporary Acen cited "Narra Mine" as one of the biggest rave anthems of the era, and Alexis Petridis described it as "hardcore's answer to Massive Attack's 'Unfinished Sympathy'." Rapper M.I.A. hailed "Narra Mine" as one of the songs that inspired her to pursue a career in music.

After a brief split, Phatz and Bonez reunited in 1995 and were signed to Internal. Their debut album, 1996's New Life 4 Tha Hunted, featured guest appearances from the New Power Generation band, Eek-A-Mouse, Rose Windross and Wu-Tang Clan member Cappadonna and their affiliates Othorized F.A.M. Three of the album's songs were recorded at the Wu-Tang Clan's studios in Staten Island. Their following album, 1999's Ad Finité, incorporated orchestral, breakbeat, and operatic elements. It featured a guest appearance from Tricky, a longtime friend of the band, and was published on his label, Durban Poison.

As one of Liam Howlett's favourite groups, he commissioned Genaside II for a remix of "Jericho" for The Prodigy's 1992 Fire/Jericho single, and their sound reportedly inspired the 1996 hit "Firestarter". The group would later support the Prodigy for some shows, including their 1997 outdoor festival at the Red Square in Moscow, where they played to an audience of 350,000 people. Lee Pomeroy, who was a live bass player for Genaside II at the time, described the Red Square show as his first big break.

== Discography ==
Studio albums

- New Life 4 The Hunted (1996)
- Ad Finité (1999)
- Return Of The Redline Evangelist (2002)

Selected singles/EPs

- "The Alchemist / Death of the Kamikazee" (1990)
- "Death Of The Kamikazee" (1990)
- "The Motiv" (1990)
- "Narra Mine" (1991)
- "Waistline Firecracker" (1996)
- "Basic Killer Instinct" (1996)
- "Mr. Maniac" (1997)
