= World's on Fire (album) =

Live album by the Prodigy
- Released: 23 May 2011
- Recorded: 24 July 2010, National Bowl, Milton Keynes
- Length: 65:33
- Label: Take Me to the Hospital; Cooking Vinyl; The End Records
- Producer: Liam Howlett; Paul Dugdale

The Prodigy chronology
Invaders Must Die (2009)	World's on Fire (2011)	The Day Is My Enemy (2015)

Professional ratings
Review scores
Source	Rating
Allmusic	3/5 stars
BBC	(positive)

World's on Fire is the first live album and second DVD by English electronic dance music band the Prodigy, released on 11 May 2011.

In October 2011, it was awarded a gold certification from the Independent Music Companies Association (IMPALA), which indicated sales in excess of 75,000 copies throughout Europe.

== Track listing ==
No.	Title	Length
1.	"Intro"	0:32
2.	"Breathe"	5:02
3.	"Omen"	3:48
4.	"Colours"	4:06
5.	"Thunder"	2:51
6.	"Warrior's Dance"	4:56
7.	"Firestarter"	4:39
8.	"Run with the Wolves"	4:23
9.	"Weather Experience"	3:57
10.	"Voodoo People"	3:45
11.	"Omen (Reprise)"	1:21
12.	"Invaders Must Die"	3:45
13.	"Smack My Bitch Up"	5:04
14.	"Take Me to the Hospital"	4:08
15.	"Everybody in the Place"	3:16
16.	"Their Law"	5:28
17.	"Out of Space"	4:32

=== DVD and Blu-ray bonus content ===
1. "Run (Brixton, London)"
2. "Spitfire / Mescaline (Brazil)"
3. "Breathe (Slane Castle, Ireland)"
4. "Poison (Glastonbury, England)"
5. "Warning (T in the Park, Scotland)"
6. "Japanese film"
7. "Voodoo (Bestival and Paris, France)"
8. "USA film"
9. "UK arena tour film"
10. "Smack My Bitch Up (Isle of Wight to Download, England)" (video)

== Personnel ==
=== The Prodigy ===
- Keith Flint - vocals
- Maxim Reality - MC, vocals
- Liam Howlett - synthesizers, programming

=== Additional musicians ===
- Rob Holliday - guitar, bass, keyboards
- Leo Crabtree - drums, electronic drums

== Charts ==
Chart (2012)	Peak position
Austrian Albums (Ö3 Austria)	29
Belgian Albums (Ultratop Flanders)	29
Dutch Albums (Album Top 100)	39
German Albums (Offizielle Top 100)	15
Irish Albums (IRMA)	28
Swiss Albums (Schweizer Hitparade)	25
UK Albums (OCC)	5
UK Dance Albums (OCC)	1
US Top Dance Albums (Billboard)	15
