= Wind It Up (Rewound) =

1993 single by the Prodigy

Single by the Prodigy

from the album Experience Expanded
- Released: 5 April 1993
- Recorded: Essex, England
- Length: 3:29 (The Rewound edit)
- Label: XL
- Songwriter: Liam Howlett
- Producer: Liam Howlett

The Prodigy singles chronology
"Out of Space" (1992)	"Wind It Up (Rewound)" (1993)	"One Love" (1993)

"Wind It Up (Rewound)" is a song by British electronica act the Prodigy, released as their fifth single on 5 April 1993. A remix of "Wind It Up", it is significantly different from the version featured on their debut album, Experience (1992), though does appear on CD2 of the Experience Expanded special edition. B-side "We Are the Ruffest" features a sped-up banjo riff. The Elektra Records version of the single in the United States was never re-released as some of the previous singles were, making it a rarity and much sought after. The Elektra version also exclusively contained four remixes never released on any other work by the band.

== Critical reception ==
Andy Beevers from Music Week gave "Wind It Up (Rewound)" a score of four out of five, writing, "Yet another track from their debut LP makes it on to the single format. It comes in remixed form with a new, similarly hard and fast breakbeat ragga rave tune, 'We Are the Ruffest', plus a new mix of the more experimental "Weather Experience". The Prodigy should have enough support to take this chartwards but they will need to follow it with something fresher." Roger Morton from NME commented, "They've had the pop hit with 'Charly' and the successful inventiveness of 'Out of Space'. So it's a shame that this burst of breakbeat overload, sucking noise, piano riffs and sped-up vocals sounds so, well, predictable." Pete Stanton from Smash Hits rated the song two out of five, adding, "'Wind It Up' does wind you up really. It's like one of those Duracell teddies that bangs a drum for ever and ever and..."

== Music video ==
The accompanying music video for "Wind It Up" was directed by Russell Curtis and produced by Emma Davis for Stigma Films. It was released on 29 March 1993 and is a performance video with shots of the band in various locations in and around Los Angeles, including Death Valley and Venice Beach. As in the band's "Everybody in the Place" video, "Wind It Up" featured the band again on tour in the US, but this time on the West Coast.

== Track listings ==
7-inch single

All tracks are written by Liam Howlett.

Side one
No.	Title	Length
1.	"Wind It Up" (The Rewound edit)	3:29

Side two
No.	Title	Length
2.	"We Are the Ruffest"	5:30

12-inch single

Side one
No.	Title	Length
1.	"Wind It Up (Rewound)"	6:15
2.	"We Are the Ruffest"	5:30

Side two
No.	Title	Length
3.	"Weather Experience" (Top Buzz remix)	6:45

CD single

No.	Title	Length
1.	"Wind It Up" (The Rewound edit)	3:29
2.	"We Are the Ruffest"	5:19
3.	"Weather Experience" (Top Buzz remix)	6:54
4.	"Wind It Up (Rewound)"	6:21

Elektra CD single
No.	Title	Length
1.	"Wind It Up" (The Rewound edit)	3:29
2.	"Wind It Up (Tightly Wound)"	6:03
3.	"Wind It Up (Forward Wind)"	5:57
4.	"Wind It Up (Unwind)"	5:38
5.	"We Are the Ruffest"	5:30
6.	"Weather Experience" (Top Buzz remix)	6:45
7.	"Wind It Up (Bonus Beats)"	1:57

Elektra CD single: Track 2, 3, 4 and 7 remixed by Tony Garcia and Guido Osorio.

== Charts ==
Chart (1993)	Peak position
Europe (Eurochart Hot 100)	42
Europe (European Dance Radio)	18
Ireland (IRMA)	6
Israel (Israeli Singles Chart)	17
Netherlands (Dutch Top 40)	10
Netherlands (Single Top 100)	37
Switzerland (Schweizer Hitparade)	16
UK Singles (Official Charts)	11
UK Dance (Music Week)	7
US Dance Club Songs (Billboard)	7
