= Maxim (musician) =

English musician

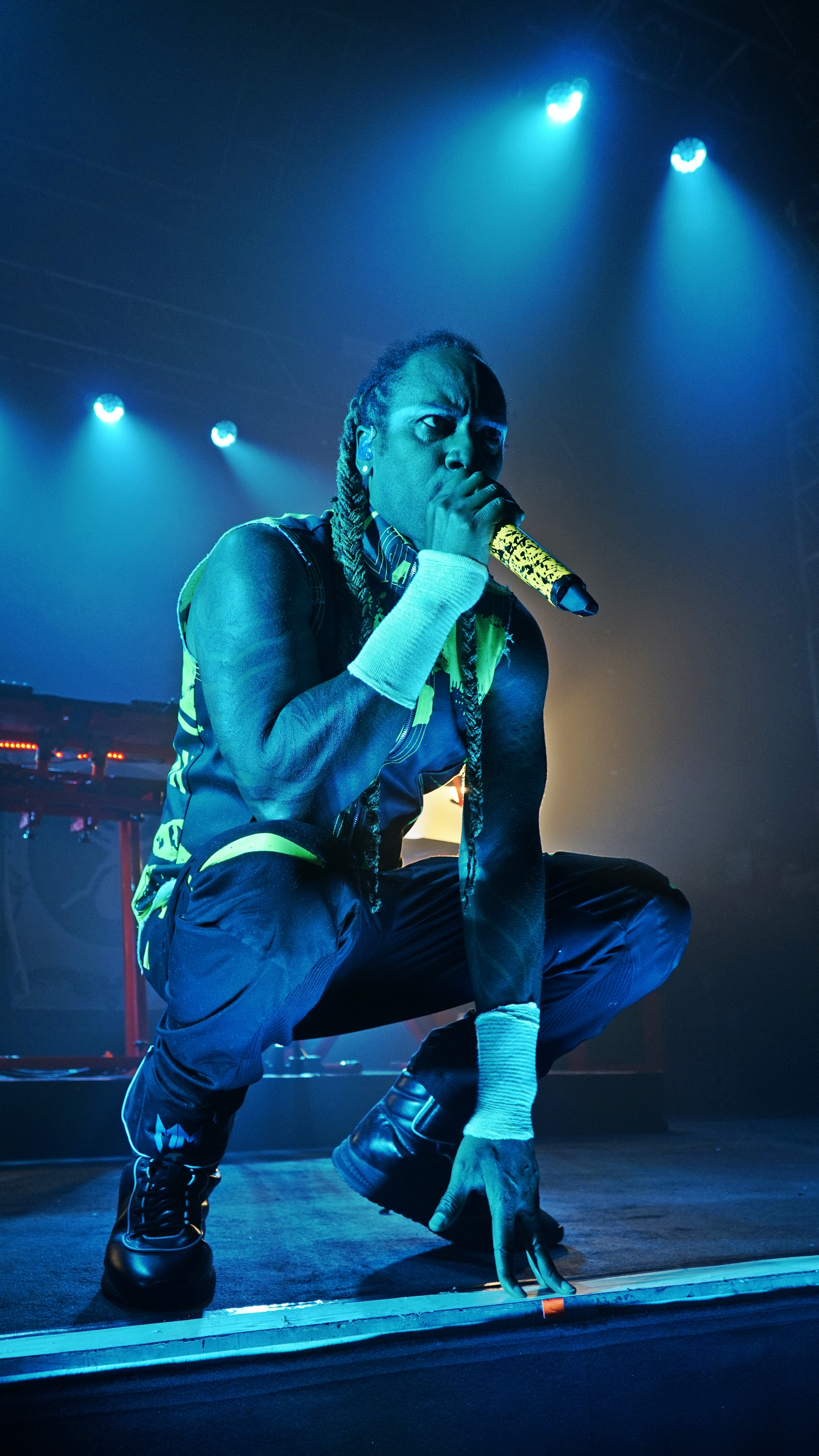
- Maxim on tour in Leeds, 2022

Background information
- Also known as: Maxim Reality
- Born: Keith Andrew Palmer; 21 March 1967 (age 59); Peterborough, England
- Genres: Big beat; breakbeat; trip hop
- Instrument: Vocals
- Years active: 1990–present
- Member of: The Prodigy

Keith Andrew Palmer (born 21 March 1967), better known by his stage name Maxim (previously Maxim Reality), is a British musician, known for being a lead vocalist and MC of electronic music band the Prodigy.

== History ==
=== Pre-Prodigy ===
Keith Andrew Palmer was born in Peterborough to Jamaican parents. He enjoyed writing poetry and verse and began MCing around the age of 14. He gained inspiration from his ten-years-older MC brother, Hitman, who introduced him into the Peterborough Reggae Soundsystem Scene. At the age of seventeen he had his first gig in Basingstoke. Ian Sherman, a fellow musician from Nottingham teamed up with Maxim and they formed 'Maxim and Sheik YanGroove'. After recording some tracks together without attracting much attention, Maxim left and went on a three-month travel throughout Europe and North Africa. Upon returning to England he moved to London to get involved in the music and reggae scene. His prior stage name, "Maxim Reality", was a reference to his interest in lyrics based on real issues.

=== The Prodigy ===
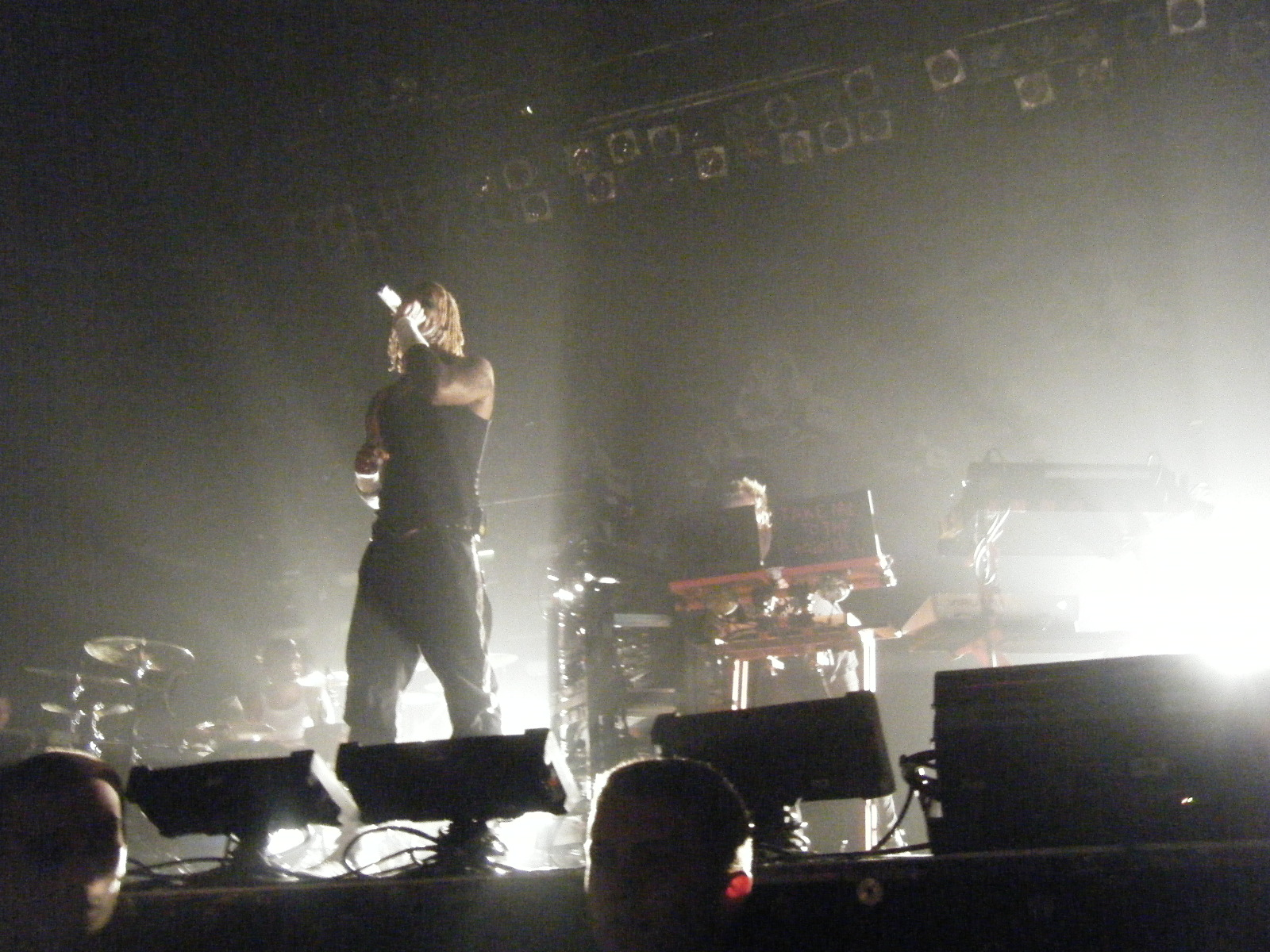
Maxim live in Philadelphia, 2009

Maxim lived near Keith Flint, a fan of Liam Howlett. After convincing Howlett to start a band, Flint recommended Maxim as a manager on the strength of Maxim's experience in the reggae scene and the music contacts he developed. Maxim did not show up at a scheduled meeting but joined them unexpectedly at their next gig, improvising lyrics. After MCing, Maxim contributed lyrics to studio albums after Experience from 1992 (although his vocal contributions were heard in the live track "Death of the Prodigy Dancers" on Experience). Maxim provided lyrics in the single "Poison" from Music for the Jilted Generation (1994), "Breathe" and the cancelled single release "Mindfields", both from The Fat of the Land (1997). However, Maxim was absent from the Prodigy album Always Outnumbered, Never Outgunned from 2004; Howlett said he believed the band needed to reinvent itself, without vocals from Flint or Maxim. Despite rumours to the contrary, the band did not break up, though Maxim explored a solo career. On Invaders Must Die, Maxim returned as a vocalist, as the band reverted to its prior way of working.

=== Solo projects ===
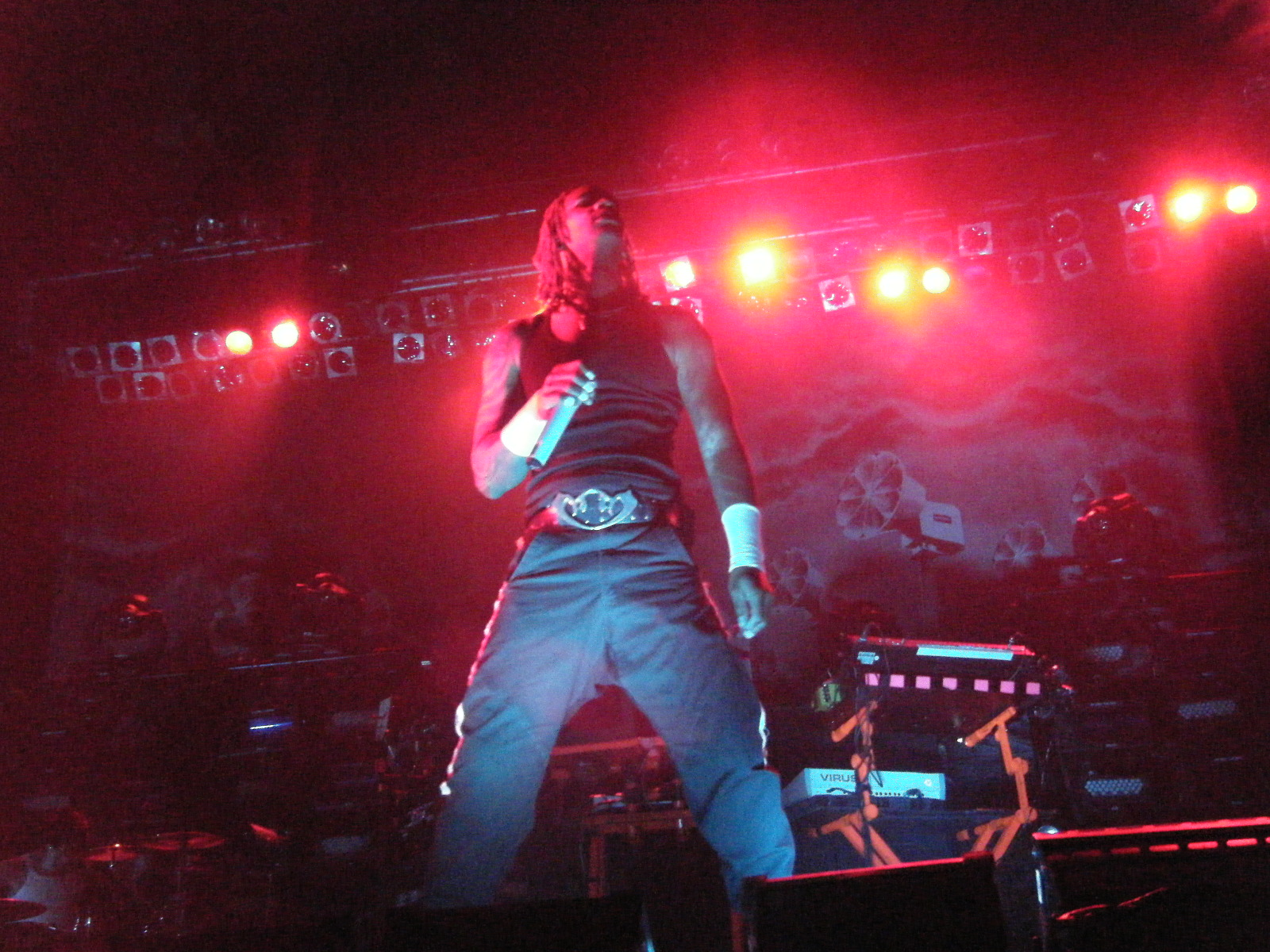
Maxim live in Philadelphia, 2009

After the Prodigy's intense touring to support The Fat of the Land, Maxim worked on his solo projects, and in 1998 he released "Dog Day" on the XL Recordings compilation CD Against the Grain, which also featured Howlett's "Dirtchamber Remix" of "Diesel Power" (from The Fat of the Land). Also in 1998, Maxim's cover version of the Rolling Stones' "Factory Girl" was released on the Beggars Banquet compilation CD, 21 Beggars Banquet. On 9 August 1999, Maxim released the EP My Web, which contained five tracks. In 2000, Maxim collaborated with Skin from Skunk Anansie on the song "Carmen Queasy", which remains his biggest solo success, peaking at number 33 on the UK singles chart in June that year. Maxim released a second single, "Scheming", on 11 September 2000, which reached number 53 on the UK singles chart, and released his debut album, Hell's Kitchen, on 2 October 2000. Maxim's second solo album, Fallen Angel, was released in 2005 and spawned one single, "I Don't Care", which failed to chart. The album was released on multiple formats, including a limited-edition CD.

Maxim has performed as a DJ and in 2013 had his first United States DJ tour. He's quoted as saying, "DJing for me is a completely fresh challenge—it gives me the opportunity to play music I’m into. I love the spontaneity, its freestyle form." Maxim's DJing was inspired by trap, and in 2014 he collaborated with Cianna Blaze and producer Blaze Billions to create and release original tracks that he could DJ, released under the name 'We Are Noize'. In an interview, Maxim said that the collaboration was a 'collective', not a new band.

In September 2019, Maxim signed an exclusive global publishing deal with Peermusic that includes their partnership on Maxim's "Red Room Arts" publishing company. In December 2019, Maxim's third solo album Love More was released on the Red Room Arts record label.

== Art ==
Using the pseudonym MM (Double M) for his mixed media artworks made with materials that include items like pills, blades, needles and bullets, Maxim's first exhibition was named "Lepidop Terror" and held in September 2011 at INC Space in London's Covent Garden. Some of his artwork is displayed online at Taylor Barnes Gallery. Maxim has donated pieces of his artwork to fundraising causes including in 2020 the "heART & Soul Auction" for "Arms Around the Child" and the online anti-racism exhibition "United for Change" hosted by Artnet to raise funds for the Stephen Lawrence Charitable Trust in the UK and "Underground Museum" and "For Freedoms" in the US.

== Discography ==
=== Albums ===
- 2000: Hell's Kitchen (released 2 October)
- 2005: Fallen Angel (released 29 March)
- 2019: Love More (released 16 December)

=== Singles and EPs ===
- 1994: Grim Reaper EP (only 500 copies made; white label)
- 1999: "My Web" (released 9 August)
- 2000: "Carmen Queasy" (released 29 May) – UK #33
- 2000: "Scheming" (released 11 September) – UK #53
- 2005: "I Don't Care"

=== With the Prodigy ===
- What Evil Lurks (1991)
- Experience (1992)
- Music for the Jilted Generation (1994)
- The Fat of the Land (1997)
- The Dirtchamber Sessions Volume One (1999)
- Always Outnumbered, Never Outgunned (2004)
- Their Law: The Singles 1990–2005 (2005)
- Invaders Must Die (2009)
- World's on Fire (2011)
- The Day Is My Enemy (2015)
- No Tourists (2018)
