= Their Law: The Singles 1990–2005 =

Greatest hits album by the Prodigy
- Released: 17 October 2005
- Recorded: 1990–2005
- Genres: Big beat; electronica; breakbeat hardcore
- Length: 72:38
- Label: XL
- Producer: Liam Howlett

The Prodigy chronology
Always Outnumbered, Never Outgunned (2004)	Their Law: The Singles 1990–2005 (2005)	Invaders Must Die (2009)

Singles from Their Law: The Singles 1990–2005
- 1. "Voodoo People (Pendulum Remix)" / "Out of Space (Audio Bullys Remix)" Released: 3 October 2005

Professional ratings
Review scores
Source	Rating
AllMusic	4.5/5 stars
Entertainment Weekly	A−
NME	7/10
Pitchfork	9.1/10
PopMatters	6/10
Rolling Stone	3/5 stars
Stylus Magazine	A

Their Law: The Singles 1990–2005 is a predominantly singles compilation by the British electronic band The Prodigy. It was released on 17 October 2005, and reached No. 1 on the UK Albums Chart on 23 October 2005.

== Formats and singles ==
The record is available in five versions:

- A single CD version (containing 15 tracks),
- A limited 2-disc set (containing 15 tracks on the first disc and 16 on the second) with a deluxe photo booklet containing 52 pages of images throughout The Prodigy's history and a 2-page biography,
- A DVD (containing a 10-song live set from Brixton Academy (20 December 1997), 15 promotional videos and also 8 bonus videos including unreleased 'Behind the Scenes' content), and
- A rare edition only released in Japan and South Korea which is limited to only 2000 copies and contains all of the above packaged in a cardboard box.
- A silver vinyl double LP including a MP3 download code (released in July 2014)

The double A-side "Voodoo People" (Pendulum Remix) / "Out of Space" (Audio Bullys Remix) was released as a single, reaching No. 20 in the UK Singles Chart.

The singles "Fire", "Wind It Up (Rewound)" and "Baby's Got a Temper" were left out of the singles compilation, although the later two had their videos featured on the DVD.

== Track listing ==
All tracks are written by Liam Howlett except where noted.

Disc one
No.	Title	Writer(s)	Note	Length
1.	"Firestarter"	Howlett; Keith Flint; Trevor Horn; Anne Dudley; J.J. Jeczalik; Paul Morley; Gary Langan; Kim Deal	a single from The Fat of the Land; a shorter edit was released as the single	4:42
2.	"Their Law" (05 Edit)	Howlett; Pop Will Eat Itself	a 2005 edit of an album track from Music for the Jilted Generation	5:36
3.	"Breathe"	Howlett; Flint; Maxim	a single from The Fat of the Land; a shorter edit was released as the single	5:36
4.	"Out of Space"		a single from Experience; a shorter edit was released as the single	5:02
5.	"Smack My Bitch Up"	Howlett; Maurice Smith; Cedric Miller; Keith Thornton; Trevor Randolph	a single from The Fat of the Land	5:43
6.	"Poison" (95 EQ Edit)	Howlett; Maxim	a 1995 single edit of a track from Music for the Jilted Generation	4:01
7.	"Girls"	Howlett; J. Martinez; F. Cooke; Hubert Barclay Eaves III; James Williams	a single from Always Outnumbered, Never Outgunned	4:12
8.	"Voodoo People" (05 Edit)		a 2005 edit of a single from Music for the Jilted Generation	3:40
9.	"Charly" (Alley Cat Remix)		a 1991 single remix of a track from Experience	5:22
10.	"No Good (Start the Dance)"		a single from Music for the Jilted Generation; a shorter edit was released as the single	6:19
11.	"Spitfire" (05 Version)		a 2005 single edit of a track from Always Outnumbered, Never Outgunned	3:26
12.	"Jericho"		a single from Experience	3:46
13.	"Everybody in the Place" (Fairground Remix)		a 1991 single remix of a track from Experience	5:09
14.	"One Love" (12" Mix)		the full/12" mix of a single from Music for the Jilted Generation; a shorter edit was released as the single	5:25
15.	"Hotride"	Howlett; Juliette Lewis; Jimmy Webb	a single from Always Outnumbered, Never Outgunned	4:32

Disc two
No.	Title	Writer(s)	Note	Length
1.	"Razor"	Flint; Howlett; Jim Davies; Kieron Pepper	a The Prodigy version of a track by Keith Flint's side band Flint from their cancelled 2003 album Device 1	4:00
2.	"Back 2 Skool"	Howlett; Neil McLellan; Maxim	a hererofore unreleased The Prodigy track that they had played live since 2004	5:02
3.	"Voodoo People" (Pendulum remix)			5:07
4.	"Under My Wheels" (remix)	Howlett; McLellan	a The Prodigy remix of a track from Always Outnumbered, Never Outgunned	3:14
5.	"No Man Army"	Howlett; Tom Morello	a faster version of a B-side from the "Smack My Bitch Up" single	4:10
6.	"Molotov Bitch"		a B-side from the "Firestarter" single	4:54
7.	"Voodoo Beats"		A shorter version of a B-side to the "Voodoo People" single.	3:54
8.	"Out of Space" (Audio Bullys remix)			4:56
9.	"The Way It Is" (live remix)	Howlett; Rod Temperton	a The Prodigy remix of a track from Always Outnumbered, Never Outgunned	4:16
10.	"We Are the Ruffest"		a B-side from the "Wind It Up (Rewound)" single	5:18
11.	"Your Love" (original mix)		a B-side from the "Charly" single	6:02
12.	"Spitfire" (live)		Recorded live at Pinkpop Festival, 13 May 2005	4:11
13.	"Their Law" (live)	Howlett; Pop Will Eat Itself	Recorded at Brixton Academy, 20 December 1997	5:31
14.	"Breathe" (live)	Howlett; Flint; Maxim	Recorded at Brixton Academy, 20 December 1997	6:39
15.	"Serial Thrilla" (live)	Howlett; Flint; Skin	Recorded at Brixton Academy, 20 December 1997	5:15
16.	"Firestarter" (live)	Howlett; Flint; Horn; Dudley; Jeczalik; Morley; Langan	Recorded at Brixton Academy, 20 December 1997	5:21
Total length:				72:38

Sample credits

- "Firestarter" contains a sample of Breeders "SOS" courtesy of 4AD / Elektra (by arrangement with Warner Special Products) and "Close to the Edit" by Art of Noise under license from ZTT Records Ltd.
- "Smack My Bitch Up" contains portions of "Give the Drummer Some" by Ultramagnetic M.C.'s from their album entitled Critical Breakdown used courtesy of Next Plateau Records.
- "Girls" contains elements from "Style of the Street" performed by Broken Glass, licensed courtes of Abyss Music Ltd. and elements from "You're the One for Me" written by Hubert Barlay Eaves III, James Williams, published by Zella Music (BMI) and Blue Image Music (PRO) (and as administrator for Diesel Music (BMI)), both divisions of Unidisc Music Inc.
- "Hotride" contains elements from "Up Up and Away" written and composed by Jim Webb, published by EMI Sosaha Music Inc / Jonathan Three Music Co.
- "The Way It Is" (live remix) contains elements from "Thriller" by Michael Jackson, written by Rod Temperton, published by Rod Songs / Almo Musiccorp (ASCAP).
- "We Are the Ruffest" features a sample taken from "Live the Life" performed by the Sindecut, published in 1990 by W.M.A. Music and owned by Virgin Records
- "Your Love" contains elements from "Shelter Me" by Circuit, copyright Chrysalis Records

=== DVD ===
Live at Brixton Academy 20 December 1997

1. "Smack My Bitch Up" – 6:24
2. "Voodoo People" – 2:40
3. "Voodoo Beats" – 4:04
4. "Their Law" – 5:15
5. "Funky Shit" – 4:58
6. "Breathe" – 5:56
7. "Serial Thrilla" – 5:38
8. "Mindfields" – 5:35
9. "Fuel My Fire" – 3:25
10. "Firestarter" – 5:30

Music videos

1. "Firestarter" – 3:47
2. "Poison" – 4:00
3. "No Good (Start the Dance)" – 3:57
4. "Breathe" – 3:58
5. "Out of Space" – 3:42
6. "Smack My Bitch Up" – 4:35
7. "Charly" – 3:38
8. "Spitfire" – 3:24
9. "Voodoo People" – 5:08
10. "Girls" – 3:49
11. "Everybody in the Place" – 3:50
12. "Baby's Got a Temper" – 4:25
13. "Wind It Up (Rewound)" – 3:29
14. "One Love" – 3:55
15. "Voodoo People" (Pendulum remix) – 3:15

Extras

1. "Spitfire" (live at Pinkpop 2005) – 3:53
2. "Their Law" (live at Red Square 1997) – 5:11
3. "Break and Enter" (live at Glastonbury 1995) – 6:04
4. "Always Outnumbered, Never Outgunned" (demo compilation mix) – 2:17 (Access by pressing right after "Break and Enter" (live at Glastonbury 1995) is played)

Behind the Scenes

1. "Firestarter" – 11:01
2. "Voodoo People" – 2:44
3. "Out of Space" – 2:47
4. "Poison" – 6:37

== Personnel ==
- Liam Howlett – production (all tracks), mixing (all tracks except "Charly" and "Everybody in the Place"), bass guitar on "Hotride", additional programming and arrangement on "Out of Space (Audio Bullys Remix)"
- Maxim – vocals on "Breathe", "Poison", "Spitfire", "Back 2 Skool", live songs
- Keith Flint – vocals on "Firestarter", "Breathe", "Hotride", "Razor", live songs
- Chaz Stevens – mixing on "Charly" and "Everybody in the Place"
- Jim Davies – guitar on "Firestarter" and "Breathe"
- Shahin Bada – additional vocals on "Smack My Bitch Up"
- The Magnificent Ping Pong Bitches – vocals on "Girls"
- Juliette Lewis – vocals on "Spitfire" and "Hotride"
- Matt Robertson – stab creation on "Spitfire"
- Scott Donaldson – guitar on "Hotride"
- Hannah Robinson – backing vocals on "Hotride"
- Pendulum – remix and additional production on "Voodoo People (Pendulum Mix)"
- Tom Morello – guitar on "No Man Army"
- Audio Bullys – remix and additional production on "Out of Space (Audio Bullys Remix)"
- Louise Boone – additional vocals on "The Way It Is (Live Remix)"
- N. McLellan – additional vocals on "The Way It Is (Live Remix)"
- Matt Robertson – recreation work on "The Way It Is (Live Remix)"
- Rinse – recreation work on "The Way It Is (Live Remix)"
- Ronald Trijber – recording on "Spitfire (Live)"
- Ben Houdijk – producer on "Spitfire (Live)"

Visual

- Phil Lee – art direction, design
- Liam Howlett – art direction
- Phil Laslett – badge technical illustration
- Berry Place – badge manufacture
- Dominic Davies – cover, booklet photography, video stills (16)
- Andy Wilshire – original photographs (36)
- Errol Jones – original photographs (2–4, 21, 30–33, 37, 39, 44)
- Sergy Sergeyen – original photographs (44)
- Steve Gullick – original photographs (4–7, 10–15, 20, 22–27, 34, 35, 38–49)
- Walter Stern – director on "Breathe" and "Poison"

== Charts ==
=== Weekly charts ===
Chart (2005–2006)	Peak position
Australian Albums (ARIA)	29
Austrian Albums (Ö3 Austria)	34
Belgian Albums (Ultratop Flanders)	21
Belgian Albums (Ultratop Wallonia)	38
Dutch Albums (Album Top 100)	18
Finnish Albums (Suomen virallinen lista)	38
German Albums (Offizielle Top 100)	45
Irish Albums (IRMA)	2
Italian Albums (FIMI)	30
New Zealand Albums (RMNZ)	11
Norwegian Albums (VG-lista)	26
Scottish Albums (Official Charts)	1
Spanish Albums (Promusicae)	75
Swiss Albums (Schweizer Hitparade)	40
UK Albums (Official Charts)	1
UK Dance Albums (Official Charts)	1
UK Independent Albums (Official Charts)	1
US Top Dance Albums (Billboard)	8

=== Year-end charts ===
Chart (2005)	Position
UK Albums (OCC)	35
Chart (2006)	Position
UK Albums (OCC)	136

== Certifications ==
Region	Certification	Certified units/sales
United Kingdom (BPI)	4× Platinum	1,200,000^{‡}
^{‡} Sales+streaming figures based on certification alone.
