= Hell's Kitchen (Maxim album) =

Studio album by Maxim
- Released: 2 October 2000
- Studio: The Red Room; Terminal Studios
- Genre: Electronic; hip hop; alternative rock; trip hop
- Length: 47:34
- Label: XL
- Producer: Maxim; Ollie J; Liam Howlett; Jim Abbiss; Line of Flight Productions

Maxim chronology
Hell's Kitchen (2000)	Fallen Angel (2005)

Singles from Hell's Kitchen
- 1. "My Web" Released: 1999; 2. "Carmen Queasy" Released: 2000; 3. "Scheming" Released: 2000

Professional ratings
Review scores
Source	Rating
The Guardian	1/5 stars
NME	2.5/5 stars

Hell's Kitchen is the debut solo studio album by Maxim, a member of the Prodigy. It was released on XL Recordings on 2 October 2000. It features guest appearances from Diamond J, Skin, Divine Styler, Trina Allen, Tony Titanium, Blood of Abraham, Sneaker Pimps, and Too Poetic.

== Track listing ==
All tracks are written by Maxim, except where noted.

No.	Title	Writer(s)	Length
1.	"Hadrian's Wall"		1:18
2.	"Killing Culture"		4:17
3.	"Carmen Queasy"	Maxim; Skin; Alan Price	4:02
4.	"Spectral Wars"	Maxim; Divine Styler	4:00
5.	"Hell's Kitchen"		4:30
6.	"Scheming"	Maxim; Liam Howlett; Trina Allen; Ollie J; Jim Davies	4:05
7.	"Worldwide Syndicates"	Maxim; Tony Titanium	4:33
8.	"Soul Seller"	Maxim; Trina Allen	3:33
9.	"Universal Scientist"	Maxim; Blood of Abraham	3:44
10.	"My Web"		4:29
11.	"Dominant Genes"		3:33
12.	"Backward Bullet"	Maxim; Chris Corner; Liam Coverdale-Howe; Ian Pickering; Joe Wilson; Dave Westlake	5:33
Total length:			47:34

Japanese edition bonus tracks
No.	Title	Length
13.	"Hell's Kitchen" (vocal version)	4:31
14.	"Prism"	3:46
Total length:		55:51

== Personnel ==
Credits adapted from liner notes.

- Maxim – production (1–11), mixing (1, 4, 6, 7, 9, 11), vocals (2, 3, 7, 8, 10–12), art direction, design
- Ollie J – production (2, 3, 5), mixing (2, 3, 5)
- Diamond J – turntables (2, 7)
- Skin – vocals (3)
- Kieron Pepper – guitar (3)
- Lalo Creme – guitar (3, 8)
- Divine Styler – vocals (4)
- Trina Allen – vocals (6, 8)
- Marianne Morgan – additional vocals (6)
- Jim Davies – guitar (6)
- Liam Howlett – production (6), bass line programming (6), drum programming (6), vocal mixing (10)
- Tony Titanium – vocals (7)
- Jim Abbiss – production (8), mixing (8)
- Emre Ramazanoglu – engineering (8)
- Blood of Abraham – vocals (9)
- Dan Ubick – guitar (9)
- Cyrus Melchor – additional programming (9)
- Chris Corner – vocals (12)
- Sneaker Pimps – guest appearance (12)
- Line of Flight Productions – production (12)
- Mike Marsh – mastering
- Phil Lee – art direction, design
- Hot Glass Design – cover models
- Dominic Davies – cover photography, booklet photography
- Dennis Morris – Maxim photography
- Jim Murray – illustration

== Charts ==
Chart (2000)	Peak position
German Albums (Offizielle Top 100)	70
UK Albums (OCC)	134
