= Fire / Jericho =

1992 single by the Prodigy

Single by the Prodigy

from the album Experience
- Released: 14 September 1992
- Recorded: Essex, England
- Genre: Rave
- Length: 3:21 ("Fire" single version); 3:47 ("Jericho" single version)
- Label: XL
- Songwriter: Liam Howlett
- Producer: Liam Howlett

The Prodigy singles chronology
"Everybody in the Place" (1991)	"Fire / Jericho" (1992)	"Out of Space" (1992)

Music video
- "Fire" on YouTube

"Fire" and "Jericho" are two songs by English electronica/rave act the Prodigy, released as a double A-side single in September 1992 by XL Recordings. It served as the band's third single and peaked at numbers 11 and one on the UK Singles Chart and the UK Dance Singles chart.

The single was sub-titled "Strangely Limited Edition" due to the 12-inch vinyl record being deleted after two weeks. This was to move the focus over to the release of the debut album, Experience, following a few weeks later. Even when the single was re-released, the subtitle was still standing.

== "Fire" ==
"Fire" uses the sample "I am the god of Hell fire, and I bring you (fire)" from The Crazy World of Arthur Brown's 1968 single of the same name. The "fire" vocal sample following "...I bring you" is taken from Daddy Freddy's "Live Jam". It samples the vocal "When I was a youth I used to burn collie weed in a Rizla" from the track "Hard Times" by Pablo Gad. The sample "how you feelin? in the party! ...are you ready?" is from the Aswad 1983 LP "Live And Direct" Soca Rumba.

Liam Howlett commented at the time that in contrast to most rave music being associated with the drug ecstasy, "Fire" was more inspired by marijuana, which was equally prevalent among ravers: "It's a smokin' song instead of an ecstasy-feel rave song. It's got a reggae feel to it, because I want to link it up to the whole smoking vibe, 'cos at the end of the day everyone who goes out raving puffs."

== "Jericho" ==
"Jericho" uses an interpolation of the distinct melody in "Kunta Kinte" by the Revolutionaries. This track was also remixed by British electronic group Genaside II. Their mix begins with a sample of Front 242's "Welcome to Paradise", a song that cites the words of American preacher Pastor Ferell Griswold "Hey poor you don't have to be poor anymore"

== "Fire" video ==
A video was directed by frequent collaborator Russell Curtis, but the band didn't like the result and it remained unreleased at the time. In particular, the Prodigy were dissatisfied with the quality of the computer graphics, even though it had been by far their most expensive video production up to this point (with scenes of the band sitting around a campfire shot in a mountain scenery in Wales). The video did however turn up on a compilation from XL called The Video Chapter. Due to its rarity, this video has been much sought after by fans. The music video can now be viewed on the official Prodigy YouTube channel, or through the Prodigy's official website. The video was left off their 2005 compilation Their Law: The Singles 1990–2005.

== Reception ==
Reviewed at the time of release, Juke called it, "Totally accelerated heartbeat techno from this dynamic group of man-machines who discard melody, form and structure for the sake of pure electronic momentum. This is a glimpse of the gonzo galaxy they will no doubt assault us with."

== Track listing ==
=== XL ===
==== 7-inch vinyl record ====
A. "Fire" (Edit) (3:21)
AA. "Jericho" (Original Version) (3:47)

==== 12-inch vinyl record ====
1. "Fire" (Burning Version) (4:42)
2. "Fire" (Sunrise Version) (5:05)
3. "Jericho" (Original Version) (3:47)
4. "Jericho" (Genaside II Remix) (5:45)

==== CD single ====
1. "Fire" (Edit) (3:21)
2. "Jericho" (Original Version) (3:47)
3. "Fire" (Sunrise Version) (5:05)
4. "Jericho" (Genaside II Remix) (5:45)

=== Elektra CD single ===
1. "Fire" (Edit) (3:21)
2. "Jericho" (Original Version) (3:47)
3. "Fire" (Sunrise Version) (5:05)
4. "Jericho" (Genaside II Remix) (5:45)
5. "Pandemonium" (4:25)

== Charts ==
Chart (1992)	Peak position
Australia (ARIA)	138
Europe (European Dance Radio)	25
UK Singles (OCC)	11
UK Dance (Music Week)	1
UK Club Chart (Music Week)	33

== Release history ==
Region	Date	Format(s)	Label(s)	Ref.
United Kingdom	14 September 1992	7-inch vinyl; 12-inch vinyl; CD	XL	
Australia	30 November 1992	CD; cassette	XL	
