= Out of Space =

1992 single by the Prodigy

Single by the Prodigy

from the album Experience
- B-side: "Ruff in the Jungle Bizness" (remix); "Music Reach (1/2/3/4)" (live)
- Released: 9 November 1992
- Recorded: Essex, UK
- Genre: Rave; techno
- Length: 3:41 (edit); 4:57 (original mix)
- Label: XL
- Songwriter: Liam Howlett
- Producer: Liam Howlett

The Prodigy singles chronology
"Fire" / "Jericho" (1992)	"Out of Space" (1992)	"Wind It Up (Rewound)" (1993)

"Out of Space" is a song by English electronic music group the Prodigy, released in November 1992, by XL Recordings, as the fourth single from their debut album, Experience (1992). The song, written and produced by Liam Howlett, samples the 1976 song "Chase the Devil" by Max Romeo as well as some lines by rapper Kool Keith on the 1988 track "Critical Beatdown" by Ultramagnetic MCs.

"Out of Space" is one of the most successful tracks of the Prodigy's early period and is often played live by the band. The song reached number five on the UK Singles Chart and was certified platinum by the British Phonographic Industry (BPI) in June 2024. Its accompanying music video was directed by Russell Curtis. In 1998, DJ Magazine included "Out of Space" in their list of "Top 100 Club Tunes".

In 2005, "Out of Space" was released as a remix by Audio Bullys in the single "Voodoo People / Out of Space" from the greatest hits compilation Their Law: The Singles 1990–2005.

== Critical reception ==
In his weekly UK chart commentary, James Masterton said, "This track is by far their most commercial yet. It may not progress much further but is their 4th Top 20 entry this year, not a feat to be sniffed at." Charles Aaron from Spin wrote, "Swirling and constantly transforming, this here's techno that bends your mind and tickles your belly."

== Music video ==
The colour-negative music video for the song, directed by Russell Curtis, featured the band raving in a rural setting. Keith Flint was dressed up in a "raver's outfit", wearing white overalls, a face mask and fluorescent gloves, sniffing Vicks VapoRub. It also featured footage of the band's live shows at the time and ostriches. The video received heavy rotation on MTV Europe in March 1993. In June 1995, it was a Box Top on British music television channel The Box.

== Track listings ==
- UK 7-inch single

A. "Out of Space"
B. "Ruff in the Jungle Bizness" (Uplifting Vibes remix) (4:17)

- UK 12-inch single
1. "Out of Space" (original mix) (5:07)
2. "Out of Space" (Techno Underworld remix) (4:48)
3. "Ruff in the Jungle Bizness" (Uplifting Vibes remix) (4:20)
4. "Music Reach (1/2/3/4)" (live) (4:21)
- UK CD single
1. "Out of Space" (edit) (3:41)
2. "Out of Space" (Techno Underworld remix) (4:48)
3. "Ruff in the Jungle Bizness" (Uplifting Vibes remix) (4:20)
4. "Music Reach (1/2/3/4)" (live) (4:21)
- UK cassette single
1. "Out of Space" (3.41)
2. "Ruff in the Jungle Bizness" (Uplifting Vibes remix) (4.20)
- US CD single
1. "Out of Space" (edit) (3:41)
2. "Out of Space" (Techno Underworld remix) (4:48)
3. "Out of Space" (Millenium mix) (6:25)
4. "Out of Space" (Celestial Bodies mix) (5:44)
5. "Ruff in the Jungle Bizness" (Uplifting Vibes mix) (4:20)
6. "Jericho" (live version) (4:22)

Note: Tracks 2 and 5 were remixed by Liam Howlett. Tracks 3 and 4 were remixed by Mark Picchiotti and Teri Bristol.

== Charts ==
=== Weekly charts ===
Chart (1992–1993)	Peak position
Australia (ARIA)	167
Belgium (Ultratop 50 Flanders)	32
Europe (Eurochart Hot 100)	33
Europe (European Dance Radio)	15
Germany (GfK)	15
Greece (Pop + Rock)	6
Ireland (IRMA)	6
Israel (Israeli Singles Chart)	8
Netherlands (Dutch Top 40)	5
Netherlands (Single Top 100)	3
Sweden (Sverigetopplistan)	24
Switzerland (Schweizer Hitparade)	30
UK Singles (Official Charts)	5
UK Club Chart (Music Week)	24
US Dance Club Play (Billboard)	42

=== Year-end charts ===
Chart (1992)	Position
UK Singles (OCC)	43

Chart (1993)	Position
Germany (Media Control)	62
Netherlands (Dutch Top 40)	38
Netherlands (Single Top 100)	43

== Certifications ==
Region	Certification	Certified units/sales
United Kingdom (BPI)	Platinum	723,000

== Release history ==
Region	Date	Format(s)	Label(s)	Ref.
United Kingdom	9 November 1992	7-inch vinyl; 12-inch vinyl; CD; cassette	XL	
Australia	28 June 1993	CD; cassette	XL; Columbia	
Australia	26 July 1993	12-inch vinyl	XL; Columbia	
