= What Evil Lurks =

1991 EP by the Prodigy

EP by the Prodigy
- Released: 25 February 1991
- Recorded: Essex, England
- Length: 17:30
- Label: XL
- Producer: Liam Howlett

The Prodigy chronology
What Evil Lurks (1991)	Experience (1992)

What Evil Lurks is an EP by English band the Prodigy. The 12" vinyl record was released in a limited number in February 1991, selling around 7,000 copies. The title track sampled the introduction to the 1930s American radio show about adventure hero The Shadow, "What evil lurks in the heart of men?" The four songs were part of the 10-track demo Liam Howlett sent to XL Recordings when he was attempting to obtain a record deal. Before "What Evil Lurks" had released, "Android" got an early release in November 1990 and it was released on the expanded version of Experience. The original version of "Everybody in the Place" is featured on the record and is different from the eventual "Fairground Version" on the single with the same name.

The EP was re-issued in a limited edition on 27 September 2004, to celebrate the 15th anniversary of XL Recordings. In the Netherlands "Android" was at that time the floorfiller, so the local version had it as an A-side with "Everybody in the Place" while "What Evil Lurks" and "We Gonna Rock" were both B-sides.

== Track listing ==
All tracks are written by Liam Howlett.

Side one
No.	Title	Length
1.	"What Evil Lurks"	4:24
2.	"We Gonna Rock"	4:34

Side two
No.	Title	Length
3.	"Android"	5:03
4.	"Everybody in the Place"	3:27
Total length:		17:30
