= Charly (song) =

1991 single by the Prodigy

"Charly (Alley Cat Remix)"

Single by the Prodigy

from the album Charly EP
- B-side: "Pandemonium"; "Your Love"; "Energy Flow (G-Force Part 1)"
- Released: 12 August 1991
- Studio: C.W.S. (Essex, England)
- Genre: Rave; toytown techno; techno-pop
- Length: 3:56 (Original Mix); 5:27 (Alley Cat Remix); 3:38 (Alley Cat 7-inch Video Edit); 5:13 (Trip into Drum & Bass Version)
- Label: XL
- Songwriter: Liam Howlett
- Producers: Liam Howlett; Chaz Stevens

The Prodigy singles chronology
"Charly (Alley Cat Remix)" (1991)	"Everybody in the Place" (1991)

Music video
- "Charly" on YouTube

Alternative cover
- Digital cover

"Charly" is a 1991 song by the British electronic act The Prodigy. Its 'Alley Cat Remix' was released as their debut single during 1991, and was included on their 2005 compilation album Their Law: The Singles 1990–2005 and on disc two of their 2008 album Experience Expanded. The version of the song that was included on their debut 1992 album Experience is the different 'Trip into Drum & Bass Version'.

Its 'Alley Cat Remix', with its 'Original Mix' as a b-side, was released in the UK on 12 August 1991 through XL Recordings on vinyl, CD and cassette tape format. Almost a year later, it was released as a double A-side single with "Everybody in the Place" in the United States on 18 June 1992 through Elektra Records on CD, digipak and maxi-single format.

On 22 November 2004 both of those versions of the song were released on digital download format. On 1 October 1992, "Charly" had sold over 200,000 copies in the UK which in turn enabled it a Silver BPI certification.

== Background ==
"Charly" was written and produced by band frontman Liam Howlett, together with Chaz Stevens as an additional producer. The single's cover art was designed by Jay McKendry Jenkins. The song samples the 1970s BBC Public Information Film, Charley Says, (from "Double Deckers" of ITV's "Say No to Strangers" campaign), in which a small child is shown with his cat. This sample later resulted in the band being unsuccessfully sued for plagiarism.

The band was criticised by the dance music magazine Mixmag for inspiring a glut of copycat rave songs which also sampled children's programming, including "Sesame's Treet" by Smart E's and "A Trip To Trumpton" by Urban Hype.

== Reception ==
The song received generally mixed reviews from critics, despite its popularity. Dooyoo.co.uk described "Charly" as "An infamous song which was played at very loud volumes for weeks and its music video turned it into one of the controversial songs of its time." NME named it Single of the Week, writing, "A pretty damn naughty techno track which cleverly uses a catch line from an old public information film. Charly says you should always tell your mummy before you go off somewhere, is the line you're going to be hearing over the next few weeks. This could be a good or bad thing as hundreds of bedroom samplers go scouring old BBC soundtrack films/records for all sorts of gems. Let's hope it gets people thinking about their tracks as well. A charter without a doubt."

Popmatters.com described "Charly" as an electronic track developed in such a way that it would ensure boredom avoidance. Stylusmagazine.com interpreted the song as "All teenage rampage and suckingly vacant insurgency". Regardless of "Charly"'s mixed critical reception, the track has still genuinely managed to garner a rather widespread cult following over the years for its innovative use of sound, as it has been considered by many fans to be one of the main turning points in electronic music history, if not the overall rave scene in general.

Alexis Petridis, writing for The Guardian in 2020, listed "Charly" at number 16 in his list of his 25 best early '90s breakbeat hardcore tracks.

== Music video ==
A music video directed by Russell Curtis features live footage of one of the costume-wearing Prodigy's early performances with other visual effects. The video contrasts the song's lyrics and "infamous" sample by playing a clip of a government warning to always tell your parents where you were going. The cartoon figure used was a young child, named Tony, who had a ginger cat named Charley; "Charley Says" was a short series of informational cartoons produced for children during the 1970s dealing with everyday issues such as not playing with matches and not talking to strangers.

== Track listings ==
- UK 12-inch single

A1. "Charly" (Alley Cat Remix) – 5:24
A2. "Pandemonium" (Original Mix) – 4:25
B1. "Your Love" (Original Mix) – 6:00
B2. "Charly" (Original Mix) – 3:56

- UK digital download (2004)
1. "Charly" (Original Mix) – 3:56
2. "Pandemonium" – 4:25
3. "Your Love" (Original Mix) – 6:00
4. "Charly" (Alley Cat Remix) – 5:27

== Chart performance ==
On 24 August 1991, "Charly" debuted at number nine on the UK Singles Chart, two weeks later it rose to a peak position of number three where it stayed for two consecutive weeks. The single re-entered the chart almost five years after release at number 66 on 20 April 1996. The single re-entered again, a further eight years on from its previous re-entry due to a digital download release of the single. This time at number 73 on 4 December 2004. Altogether it spent a total of six weeks within the top 10 and 12 weeks within the top 75.

=== Weekly charts ===
Chart (1991)	Peak position
Australia (ARIA)	161
Europe (Eurochart Hot 100)	11
Ireland (IRMA)	9
Israel (Israeli Singles Chart)	15
Luxembourg (Radio Luxembourg)	11
UK Singles (Official Charts)	3
UK Dance (Music Week)	1
UK Club Chart (Record Mirror)	14

=== Year-end charts ===
Chart (1991)	Position
UK Singles (OCC)	26

== Certifications ==
Region	Certification	Certified units/sales
United Kingdom (BPI)	Silver	200,000^{^}
^{^} Shipments figures based on certification alone.

== Release history ==
Region	Date	Format(s)	Label(s)	Ref.
United Kingdom	12 August 1991	7-inch vinyl; 12-inch vinyl; CD	XL	
Australia	9 September 1991	12-inch vinyl	XL	
