= Experience (The Prodigy album) =

Studio album by the Prodigy
- Released: 28 September 1992
- Recorded: 1990–1992
- Studios: Strongroom (London); Earthbound (Braintree, Essex)
- Genres: Breakbeat hardcore; rave
- Length: 59:28; 56:54 (Expanded/CD2); 65:25 (Expanded UK bonus tracks)
- Label: XL
- Producer: Liam Howlett

The Prodigy chronology
What Evil Lurks (1991)	Experience (1992)	Music for the Jilted Generation (1994)

Singles from Experience
- 1. "Charly" Released: 12 August 1991; 2. "Everybody in the Place" Released: 30 December 1991; 3. "Fire/Jericho" Released: 14 September 1992; 4. "Out of Space" Released: 9 November 1992; 5. "Wind It Up (Rewound)" Released: 5 April 1993

Experience (also known as The Prodigy Experience) is the debut album by the British electronic music group the Prodigy. It was released on 28 September 1992 by XL Recordings.

== Album information ==
Liam Howlett was the sole composer; of the additional three members at that time, only Maxim Reality actually contributed to the album, performing the vocals on the last track. A wide variety of artists in the breakbeat hardcore scene in the early 1990s are given respect and namechecked in the sleeve notes of the album, including SL2, Carl Cox, Moby, Tim Westwood, Orbital and Aphex Twin. Experience reached No. 2 on the CIN's Dance Albums Chart and No. 12 on the Albums Chart and went on to achieve platinum status. It was later licensed to Elektra Records for release in the United States.

== Reception ==
Professional ratings
Review scores
Source	Rating
AllMusic	5/5 stars
Christgau's Consumer Guide	(2-star Honorable Mention)
Entertainment Weekly	B
Mojo	4/5 stars
Philadelphia Inquirer	3.5/4 stars
Q	4/5 stars
Record Collector	4/5 stars
Select	5/5
Spin	9/10

From contemporary reviews, Kris Needs of NME declared that "the time-pod to enable future generations to get a handle on what happened in 1992, The Prodigy's debut album will be a much safer bet to illustrate the Rave Phenomenon than any half-assed "40 Bowel-Erupting Rave Greats" compilation. If only to show what killed it, some would say."

Experience received very positive reviews upon its release. AllMusic gave the album 5 out of 5 stars, saying that it "shows the Prodigy near the peak of their game from the get go" and stating that "almost every song sounds like a potential chart topper". Tom Ewing of Freaky Trigger commended the album as "four-minute-warnings, [...] hyperactive ravey blasts which boasted genuine irreverence rather than learned attitude."

Moby credited Experience with changing his perception about dance albums; previously he felt that "dance albums had always failed [...] because they didn't work over the full length of the record. Mostly they were singles collections which was exactly what I didn't want to do," and noted that Experience "impressed me because they'd managed to create a full listening experience which encompassed various styles. This was the kind of vision I had for my debut album."

== Track listing ==
All tracks are written by Liam Howlett.

No.	Title	Length
1.	"Jericho"	3:42
2.	"Music Reach (1/2/3/4)"	4:12
3.	"Wind It Up"	4:33
4.	"Your Love" (Remix)	5:30
5.	"Hyperspeed (G-Force Part 2)"	5:16
6.	"Charly" (Trip into Drum and Bass Version)	5:12
7.	"Out of Space"	4:57
8.	"Everybody in the Place (155 and Rising)"	4:10
9.	"Weather Experience"	8:06
10.	"Fire" (Sunrise Version)	4:57
11.	"Ruff in the Jungle Bizness"	5:10
12.	"Death of the Prodigy Dancers" (Live)	3:43
Total length:		59:28

Experience Expanded disc 2
No.	Title	Length
1.	"Your Love" (from "Charly" single)	6:02
2.	"Ruff in the Jungle Bizness" (Uplifting Vibes Remix; from "Out of Space" single)	4:16
3.	"Charly" (Alley Cat Remix; from "Charly" single)	5:21
4.	"Fire" (Edit; from "Fire/Jericho" single)	3:24
5.	"We Are the Ruffest" (from "Wind It Up" single)	5:18
6.	"Weather Experience" (Top Buzz Remix; from "Wind It Up" single)	6:53
7.	"Wind It Up (Rewound)"	6:21
8.	"G-Force, Pt. 1 (Energy Flow)" (from "Everybody in the Place" single)	5:23
9.	"Crazy Man" (from "Everybody in the Place" single)	4:05
10.	"Out of Space" (Techno Underworld Remix; from "Out of Space" single)	4:44
11.	"Everybody in the Place" (Fairground Remix; from "Everybody in the Place" single)	5:07
Total length:		56:54

Experience Expanded disc 2 UK bonus tracks
No.	Title	Length
12.	"Android" (from What Evil Lurks EP)	5:04
13.	"Out of Space" (Live from Pukkelpop 2005; previously unreleased)	3:27
Total length:		65:25

=== Notes ===
- Tracks "Wind It Up" (and its "Rewound" Mix), "Hyperspeed (G-Force Part 2)" and "Charly (Trip into Drum and Bass Version)" have been removed from streaming services, most likely due to sampling rights issues.

== Personnel ==
- Liam Howlett – production, keyboards, synthesizers, sampling, programming, engineering
- Maxim Reality – vocals on "Death of the Prodigy Dancers (Live)"
- Keith Flint – dancer on "Death of the Prodigy Dancers (Live)"
- Leeroy Thornhill – dancer on "Death of the Prodigy Dancers (Live)"
- Simone – vocals on "Music Reach (1/2/3/4)", "Ruff in the Jungle Bizness", and "Rip Up the Sound System" (non-album song)
- Alex Garland – artwork

== Charts ==
=== Weekly charts ===
Chart (1992–93)	Peak position
Australia (ARIA)	163
Dutch Albums (Album Top 100)	20
Finnish Albums (Suomen virallinen lista)	39
French Albums (SNEP)	59
German Albums (Offizielle Top 100)	75
Scottish Albums (Official Charts)	91
UK Albums (Official Charts)	12
Dance Albums (CIN)	2
UK Independent Albums (Official Charts)	14

Chart (2026)	Peak position
Croatian International Albums (HDU)	12

== Certifications ==
Region	Certification	Certified units/sales
Poland (ZPAV)	Gold	50,000^{*}
United Kingdom (BPI)	Platinum	300,000^{^}
^{*} Sales figures based on certification alone.^{^} Shipments figures based on certification alone.
