= The Dirtchamber Sessions Volume One =

Compilation album (Mixtape) by The Prodigy (Liam Howlett)
- Released: 22 February 1999
- Recorded: 1998
- Genre: Electronica; big beat
- Length: 51:21
- Label: XL
- Producer: Liam Howlett

The Prodigy chronology
The Fat of the Land (1997)	The Dirtchamber Sessions Volume One (1999)	Always Outnumbered, Never Outgunned (2004)

Professional ratings
Review scores
Source	Rating
AllMusic	4/5 stars
Entertainment Weekly	C+
Hot Press	9/12
Mojo	4/5 stars
NME	7/10
Rolling Stone	3.5/5 stars
Release Magazine	7/10
Sputnikmusic	4.5/5
Tom Hull – on the Web	A−

Prodigy Present: The Dirtchamber Sessions Volume One is a 1999 solo mix album by Liam Howlett of The Prodigy, with the latter name used as a moniker. Its original mix was produced for BBC Radio 1's mix show The Breezeblock.

The album, which contains more than 48 tunes from various artists mixed and edited, was the result of a 1998 guest DJ appearance by Howlett on Mary Anne Hobbs's Breezeblock show on BBC Radio 1, for which he produced a similar set.

As a consequence of the popularity of bootleg copies of the show, an official album was released that contained an edited but longer version of the Breezeblock mix. The two mixes are not the same because permission to use certain tracks for the official album was not forthcoming. Most notable is the removal of The Beatles' "Sgt. Peppers Lonely Hearts Club Band", which was also removed from The Chemical Brothers' Brothers Gonna Work It Out DJ Mix but was included in the earlier release named Radio 1 Anti-Nazi Mix.

== Reception ==
- Alternative Press (10/00, p. 120) – Included in AP's "10 Essential DJ-Mix Albums" – "Dark, raw and furious"
- Muzik (1/00, p. 84) – Ranked #9 in Muzik's "Compilations of the Year '99" – "...as this glorious mash of styles signifies, Liam Howlett knows a thing or two about pop music... The track sequencing is equally inspiring."

== Track listing (samples will be listed once by relevance) ==
1. Section 1 – 7:18
  1. Run D.M.C, "Peter Piper (Scratch stab) (uncredited) (1984)
  2. Simon Harris - BB&S Vol. 4 "Big Beats" (Drum Loop) taken from Billy Squier "The Big Beat" (1980)
  3. Run-D.M.C., "Here We Go (Live At The Funhouse)" (Vocals over "Big Beats") (uncredited) (1985)
  4. Mantronix, "Who is It" (Freestyle Mix) (Trumpet Riff sample + 'Get Down!' sample ) (uncredited) (1986)
  5. Rasmus, "Punk Shock" - is mislabelled as "Tonto's Release" in the CD booklet. (1998)
  6. Sugarhill Gang, "8th Wonder" (Whoo-haa scream) (uncredited) (1980)
  7. Hardnoise, "Untitled" (1991)
  8. Double Dee & Steinski, "Lesson 1" ("Check this out!" sample) (uncredited) (1982)
  9. Simon Harris "Different Screams" (vocals) from BB&S Vol. 1 (1987) taken from Syl Johnson, "Different Strokes" (uncredited) (1967)
  10. The Chemical Brothers, "Chemical Beats" (1994)
  11. Ultramagnetic MCs, "Kool Keith Housing Things" (1988)
  12. Lightnin' Rod featuring Jalal, Sport from UBB Vol. 19 (1973)
  13. La Pregunta, "Shangri La" from UBB Vol. 10 (uncredited) (1978)
  14. Ultramagnetic MCs, "Give the Drummer Some" (1988)
  15. Time Zone Featuring Afrika Bambaataa, "Wildstyle" (1983)
2. Section 2 – 6:44
  1. Bomb The Bass, "Bug Powder Dust (Dust Brothers Mix)" (Intro Effect) (1994)
  2. Bomb the Bass, "Bug Powder Dust" (1994)
  3. Grandmaster Melle Mel, "Pump Me Up" mislabeled as being by Grandmaster Flash (1985)
  4. Psychedelic Skratch Bastards A.K.A I.S.P, "Battle Breaks" (Like That! sample) (uncredited) (1992)
  5. The Charlatans, "How High" (1997)
  6. Melvin Bliss, "Synthetic Substitution" from UBB Vol. 5 (Drum Loop) (uncredited) (1973)
  7. Darth Fader and Scarecrow Willy, "Toasted Marshmallow Feet Braxe" (1995) (Drum Loop) (uncredited) (1995)
  8. Darth Fader and Scarecrow Willy, "Toasted Marshmallow Feet Braxe" (1995) (Drum Loop) taken from Schoolly D, "P.S.K. What Does It Mean?" (Drum Loop) (uncredited) (1985)
  9. Run-D.M.C., "Sucker M.C.'s" (Drum Loop) (uncredited) (1983)
  10. Treacherous Three, "Feel the Heartbeat" (HA-HA Sample) (uncredited) (1981)
  11. The Prodigy, "Poison" (1995)
  12. Ramsey Lewis, "The Mighty Quinn" from SB Vol. 4 (uncredited) (1968)
  13. Simon Harris, "Long Trumpet" from BB&S Vol. 9 taken from The JBs, "The Grunt" (uncredited) (1973)
  14. Beastie Boys "Time to Get Ill" (Electric guitar riff) (1986)
  15. Jane's Addiction, "Been Caught Stealing" (1990)
  16. Tim Dog featuring KRS-One, "I Get Wrecked" (1993)
3. Section 3 – 6:03
  1. Mix Master Mike, Eardrum Medicine (Untoned Whistle Sound Effect) (uncredited) (1997)
  2. Babe Ruth, "The Mexican" (1972)
  3. The B-Boys, "Rock the House" (1983)
  4. Psychedelic Skratch Bastards A.K.A I.S.P "Battle Breaks" (Drum Break) (uncredited) (1992)
  5. The Chemical Brothers, "(The Best Part of) Breaking Up" (1996)
  6. Davy DMX, "One For The Treble" (Scratch Samples) (uncredited) (1984)
  7. Afrika Bambaataa and Soulsonic Force, "Renegades of Funk" ('Cause every time I pop into the beat we get fresh' sample) (uncredited) (1983)
  8. Word of Mouth, "King Kut" (1985)
  9. Gaz, "Sing Sing" from UBB Vol. 5 (Drum loop) (uncredited) (1978)
  10. Simon Harris "113 B.P.M BB&S Special Edition (Drum loop) taken from Dynamic Corvettes, "Funky Music Is the Thing" (uncredited) (1975)
  11. Uncle Louie, "I Like Funky Music" from UBB Vol. 6 (Trumpet stab) (uncredited) (1979)
4. Section 4 – 7:52
  1. DJ Mink Featuring The K.I.D & Carruthers, "Hey! Hey! Can You Relate" (1990)
  2. The KLF, "What Time Is Love? (Pure Trance)" (1988)
  3. Frankie Bones, "Funky Acid Makossa" (Beat Over KLF) from BB Vol. 2 (1988)
  4. Frankie Bones, "Shafted Off" (Drum Break) BB Vol. 2 (1988)
  5. Frankie Bones, "And the Break Goes Again" (Italia Mix) BB Vol. 5 (1988)
  6. Meat Beat Manifesto, "Radio Babylon" (1990)
  7. Marley Marl and MC Shan, "Marley Marl Scratch" ('On the turntables i would say he is nice'/His mixing style is so precise' Sample) (uncredited) (1985)
  8. Kool & The Gang, "Music Is The Message" (Drum Loop) (uncredited) (1985)
  9. Marley Marl and MC Shan, "Marley Marl Scratch" ('give 'em an example how a DJ works Sample) (uncredited) (1985)
  10. Herbie Hancock, "Rockit" (Snippet) (1983)
  11. The Prodigy, "Smack My Bitch Up" (Snippet) (1997)
  12. Public Enemy, ¨Public Enemy No. 1" (Snippet) (1987)
  13. Beastie Boys, "Its The New Style ('B-E-A-S-T-I-E, what up Mike D' sample) (1986)
  14. The 45 King, "900 Number" (Snippet) (1989)
  15. The Prodigy, "Molotov Bitch" (Snippet) (1996)
  16. Propellerheads, "Spybreak!" (1997)
  17. Beastie Boys, "It's the New Style" (Vocals over Spybreak!) (1986)
  18. Word of Mouth, "King Kut" ('Cutting and scratching' sample vocal) (1985)
  19. Word of Mouth, "King Kut (Latin Rascals Remix)" (Outro Effect)(1985)
5. Section 5 – 4:57
  1. DJ Swamp, "Skip Proof Guitar Tone 1" (Guitar Tone) (uncredited) (1998)
  2. Mix Master Mike, "Eardrum Medicine" (Untoned Whistle/Synth Effect) (uncredited) (1997)
  3. Sex Pistols, "New York" (1977)
  4. Fatboy Slim, "Punk to Funk" (1996)
  5. Dj Rectangle, "Original Battle Breaks" (Untoned Whistle/Synth Effect) (uncredited) (1992)
  6. Medicine, "I'm Sick" (1997)
  7. Psychedelic Skratch Bastards A.K.A I.S.P "Battle Breaks" (Scratch effect)(1992)
6. Section 6 – 5:48
  1. Darth Fader and Scarecrow Willy, "Toasted Marshmallow Feet Braxe" ('OK' intro sample) taken from "Man on the Moon" The Apollo 11 mission (1969) + Simon Harris, "Weather 1" from BB&S Vol. 11 (Weather storm sample) (1993)
  2. Grand Mixer DXT, "The Home of Hip Hop" (1985)
  3. J.V.C Force, "Strong Island" (1984)
  4. Primal Scream, "Kowalski" (1997)
  5. Beastie Boys, "Time to Get Ill" (1986)
  6. Barry White, "I'm Gonna Love You Just a Little More Baby" from UBB Vol. 21 (1973)
  7. Simon Harris "#1 Stab" from BB&S Vol. 3 (1992) (Trumpet sample) taken from All The People featuring Robert Moore, "Cramp Your Style"(1972)
  8. Fred Wesley & The J.B.'s, "Blow Your Head" from Paul Winley's SDB Vol. 1 (1974)
  9. Dimples D, "Sucker DJ's"('He cuts the music with so much class' sample) (uncredited) (1983)
  10. Public Enemy, Public Enemy#1 (1985)
  11. Grand Mixer DXT, "The Home of Hip Hop" ('Real hip hop ma man!' sample) (1985)
  12. T La Rock, "Breaking Bells" (1986)
7. Section 7 – 3:59
  1. LL Cool J, "Get Down" (1987)
  2. Digital Underground, "The Humpty Dance" ('oh, oh, oh my baby!' snippet)(1989)
  3. Uptown, "Dope on Plastic" (1989)
  4. Coldcut, "Beats and Pieces" (1986)
  5. The Wild Magnolias, "Soul, Soul, Soul" (Drum Loop) from UBB Vol. 5 (uncredited) (1971)
  6. Coldcut, "Beats and Pieces" ('Honey i have rhythms i haven't used yet'/ Laugh sample Outro) (1986)
8. Section 8 – 8:40
  1. London Funk Allstars, "Sure Shot" (1995)
  2. West Street Mob, "Break Dance – Electric Boogie" (1983)
  3. Dj Roughneck, "Breakdown" (Breakdown! sample) (uncredited) (1998)
  4. The Motors, "Whiskey & Wine" (Drum break) UBB Vol.17 (uncredited) (1977)
  5. The Shadows, "Apache" taken from UBB Vol. 1 (Stratocaster riff sample) (1990)
  6. Hijack, "Doomsday of Rap" (1988)
  7. Spoonie Gee and The Treacherous Three, "Love Rap" ('Go Off!, Go Off!' sample) (uncredited) (1980)
  8. Hijack, "Doomsday of Rap" (1988)
  9. Simon Harris, "Air Raid Siren" (Siren sample) from BB&S Vol. 3 (uncredited) (1989)
  10. James Brown, "Talkin' Loud and Sayin' Nothing" (Keep on singin', keep on singin'! sample) (uncredited) (1972)
  11. Hijack, "Doomsday of Rap" (1988)
  12. Renegade Soundwave, "Ozone Breakdown" (1988)
  13. The Motors, "Whiskey & Wine" (Drum break) UBB Vol.17 (uncredited) (1977)
  14. The Beginning of the End, "Funky Nassau" from Paul Winley's SDB Vol.3 (1971)
  15. The Jimmy Castor Bunch, "It's Just Begun" from Paul Winley's SDB Vol. 6 (1972)
