= Everybody in the Place =

1991 single by The Prodigy

Single by the Prodigy

from the album Experience
- B-side: "Crazy Man"; "G-Force" (Energy Flow); "Rip Up the Sound System"
- Released: 23 December 1991
- Studio: C.W.S. (Essex, England)
- Genre: Breakbeat hardcore; techno; rave
- Length: 3:27 (What Evil Lurks); 4:10 (155 and Rising); 5:08 (Fairground remix)
- Label: XL
- Songwriter: Liam Howlett
- Producers: Liam Howlett; Chaz Stevens

The Prodigy singles chronology
"Charly" (1991)	"Everybody in the Place" (1991)	"Fire" / "Jericho" (1992)

Music video
- "Everybody in the Place" on YouTube

"Everybody in the Place" is the second official single released by the British electronic dance band the Prodigy from their debut album, Experience (1992). It was released on 23 December 1991 through XL Recordings in the United Kingdom.

The single features the "Fairground Remix" version of the song. The version on the album is the "155 & Rising Version", which is significantly longer and faster in beats per minute than the original mix featured on the What Evil Lurks EP.

The single peaked at number two on the UK Singles Chart, beaten to number one by the re-release of Queen's "Bohemian Rhapsody" following the death of Freddie Mercury.

The original CD single was released with five tracks, which went against British chart regulations. The track "Rip Up the Sound System" was removed on the re-issue to comply with the chart regulations, but is still available on the 12" vinyl. The cover features a photograph of the now dismantled Corkscrew roller coaster at Alton Towers.

The song was released six months later on 18 June 1992 as a double A-side with first single "Charly" through Elektra Records in the United States. The single is featured on the band's greatest hits compilation Their Law: The Singles 1990–2005.

== Music video ==
The accompanying music video for "Everybody in the Place" was shot in December 1991 during a trip to New York, during which they also played at the Limelight Club. It features the band dancing in a fast-paced succession of short shots. The video ends with the band appearing to be pursued by the police but escaping.

== Legacy ==
In 1998, DJ Magazine ranked "Everybody in the Place" number 88 in their "Top 100 Club Tunes". In 2022, Classic Pop ranked it number 31 in their list of the top 40 dance tracks from the 90's.

== Track listings ==
- 7-inch vinyl record

A. "Everybody in the Place" (Fairground edit) (3:49)
B. "G-Force" (Energy Flow) (4:41)

- 12-inch vinyl record

A1. "Everybody in the Place" (Fairground remix) (5:08)
A2. "Crazy Man" (original version) (4:01)
B1. "G-Force" (Energy Flow) (original version) (5:18)
B2. "Rip Up the Sound System" (original version) (4:04)

- CD1
1. "Everybody in the Place" (Fairground edit) (3:51)
2. "G-Force" (Energy Flow) (5:18)
3. "Crazy Man" (4:01)
4. "Rip Up the Sound System" (4:04)
5. "Everybody in the Place" (Fairground remix) (5:08)
- CD2
1. "Everybody in the Place" (Fairground edit) (3:51)
2. "G-Force" (Energy Flow) (5:18)
3. "Crazy Man" (4:01)
4. "Everybody in the Place" (Fairground remix) (5:08)

== Charts ==
=== Weekly charts ===
Chart (1991–1993)	Peak position
Australia (ARIA)	125
Europe (Eurochart Hot 100)	10
Europe (European Dance Radio)	11
Ireland (IRMA)	2
Netherlands (Single Top 100)	65
Netherlands (Dutch Top 40)	52
UK Singles (Official Charts)	2
UK Dance (Music Week)	1
UK Club Chart (Record Mirror)	6

=== Year-end charts ===
Chart (1992)	Position
UK Singles (OCC)	46

== Release history ==
Region	Date	Format(s)	Label(s)	Ref.
United Kingdom	23 December 1991	12-inch vinyl; CD1	XL	
United Kingdom	6 January 1992	7-inch vinyl; cassette	XL	
United Kingdom	20 January 1992	CD2	XL	
Australia	8 June 1992	12-inch vinyl; CD; cassette	Columbia; XL	

== Media references ==
The artist Jeremy Deller used the title for Beats, a film about UK rave culture, even though the band does not appear in it.
