= The Prodigy =

English electronic rave music group

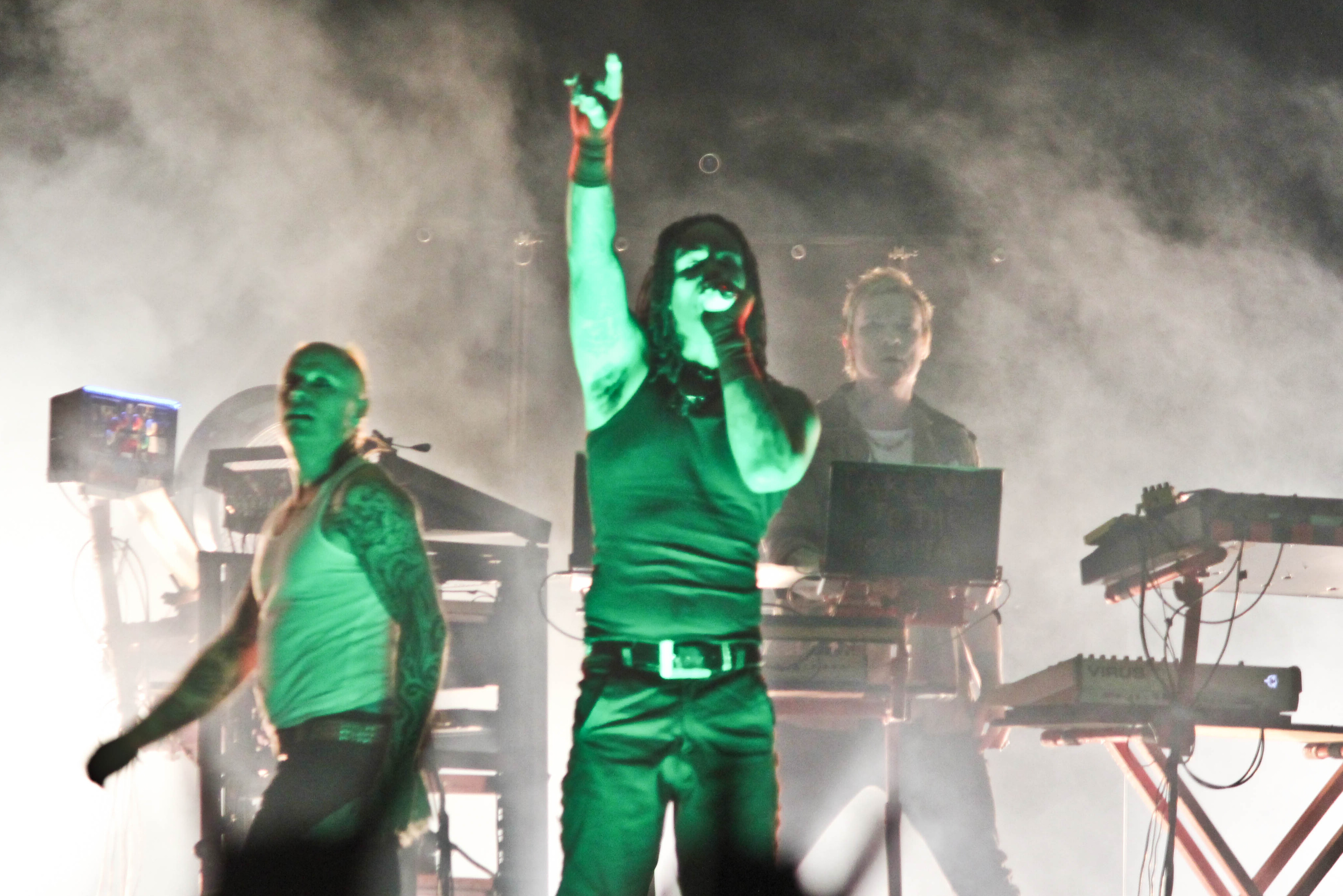
- The Prodigy in 2009 performing at Bangalore; From left to right: Keith Flint, Maxim, and Liam Howlett

Background information
- Origin: Braintree, England
- Genres: Big beat; breakbeat hardcore; alternative dance; Techno rave
- Works: Discography
- Years active: 1990-present
- Labels: XL; Elektra; Mute; Maverick; Disco Mix Club; Cooking Vinyl; Ragged Flag; Take Me to the Hospital; Beggars Banquet; Vertigo; The End; Shock; Warner Bros.; BMG
- Members: Liam Howlett; Maxim
- Past members: Keith Flint; Leeroy Thornhill; Sharky
- Website: theprodigy.com

The Prodigy are an English electronic music band formed in Braintree in 1990 by producer, keyboardist, and songwriter Liam Howlett and dancers Keith Flint and Leeroy Thornhill, who respectively went on to contribute vocals and live keyboards on occasion. They were joined by MC and lead vocalist Maxim. AllMusic described the Prodigy as "the premiere dance act for the alternative masses" and "the Godfathers of Rave". They are considered to be pioneers of big beat and in a number of breakbeat led musical genres including breaks and breakbeat hardcore. Liam Howlett describes their style as electronic punk.

The band emerged during the underground rave scene and achieved early success in 1991 with their debut singles "Charly" and "Everybody in the Place", which reached the UK top five. After their debut album Experience (1992), the band moved from their rave roots and incorporated techno and breakbeat influences on their follow-up, the critically acclaimed Music for the Jilted Generation (1994). They reached their commercial and critical peak with their third studio album The Fat of the Land (1997), which went to No. 1 in 16 countries, including the UK and the US, and spawned the UK number one singles "Firestarter" and "Breathe" in 1996. The third single, "Smack My Bitch Up", was a UK top ten hit and generated considerable controversy over its suggestive lyrics and music video. Thornhill left the band in 2000 and Flint died in 2019, leaving Howlett and Maxim as the remaining members. After a hiatus, the band returned to stage back on tour.

The Prodigy are one of the most successful electronic groups of all time, selling an estimated 25 million records worldwide including over 4.7 million albums in the UK. They have scored seven consecutive UK number one albums. The band have won many awards during their career, including two Brit Awards for Best British Dance Act, three MTV Video Music Awards, five MTV Europe Music Awards, and two Grammy Award nominations.

== History ==
=== Formation and early singles success (1989–1991) ===
In 1989, 18-year-old DJ, musician, and songwriter Liam Howlett returned to his hometown of Braintree, Essex after quitting his gig as DJ in the hip-hop group Cut 2 Kill. He had started to make his own music three years prior, beginning with hip-hop and house music before he focused on the rave scene that was on original music at home.

It was in Braintree where Howlett met dancers Keith Flint and Leeroy Thornhill at one of his gigs at The Barn nightclub. Flint requested Howlett make a mix tape for him, to which Howlett obliged and returned a cassette several days later with some of his own songs on the other side. Howlett had scratched the word "Prodigy" onto the cassette, referring to the Moog Prodigy synthesizer which he used to make some of the music. The tape was well received by Flint and Thornhill, who developed new dance sequences to the music and suggested to Howlett they begin a group together. The three settled on the Prodigy as their name and enlisted a fourth live member, female dancer and vocalist Sharky (real name Sheila Burke), a friend of Flint's; the group officially formed on 5 October 1990. Their first gig took place in February 1991 at The Four Aces Club (then called Labrynth) in Dalston. It was organised by Ziggy (Ziad Sabir Chowdry), a local promoter who became their first manager. Howlett described the venue as the roughest in London at the time. Shortly before the gig, the group met rapper and MC Maxim, then known as Maxim Reality. Flint pitched for Maxim to join the group on the strength of his connections with the reggae scene and the music contacts he had developed. Maxim failed to turn up at a scheduled meeting, but joined the Prodigy unexpectedly at their first gig, where he improvised lyrics on stage.

Shortly after their live debut, Howlett completed a 10-track demo tape on a Roland W-30 sampling keyboard and approached Tam Tam Records with the hope of securing a record deal, but was declined. He turned to XL Recordings, headed by Tim Palmer and Nick Halkes, who agreed to a meeting and subsequently signed the group to a contract that involved the release of four singles. This culminated in their first official release, the EP What Evil Lurks, in February 1991, containing four tracks that Howlett had produced on the demo. Shortly after signing to XL Records, the Prodigy were reduced to a four-piece when Sharky could no longer commit to the band and left.

In August 1991, the Prodigy released their debut single "Charly", which samples dialogue from the Charley Says series of animated films produced by the Central Office of Information. It became a hit in the rave scene, and reached No. 1 on the UK Dance Singles Chart and No. 3 on the UK Singles Chart, thus catapulting the band into the wider public attention. The success of "Charly" began a trend of mixing dance and rave tracks with cartoon samples, such as "A Trip to Trumpton" by Urban Hype and "Sesame's Treet" by Smart E's, which were a hit with clubbers but not to the critics, who dismissed it as "kiddie rave" or "toytown techno". Howlett realised that a follow-up single in the same style "would have been the downfall of us" and wanted to avoid such labels. He spent earnings from "Charly" on new instruments and studio equipment, expanding the group's sound with a Roland U-220 sound module and TR-909 drum machine. Their second single, "Everybody in the Place (Fairground Edit)", was released in December 1991. It reached No. 2 in the UK, beaten to the top spot by a re-release of "Bohemian Rhapsody" by Queen following the death of their singer Freddie Mercury.

=== Experience and Music for the Jilted Generation (1991–1995) ===
In 1991 and 1992, Howlett recorded the band's debut studio album Experience at his home facility, Earthbound Studios. The project began after XL Recordings suggested the group make one, and initially Howlett wanted to produce a "rave concept album" inspired by Pink Floyd, but abandoned the idea due to the risk of limiting his musical ideas. Released in September 1992, the album peaked at No. 12 on the UK Albums Chart and was certified platinum by the British Phonographic Industry (BPI) for selling over 300,000 copies. The album contains many samples of other artists, and closes with a live track featuring Maxim on vocals. It is considered a landmark release in British rave music, and was an influential record for American DJ and musician Moby for his early studio releases. Its third single, "Fire/Jericho", was on track to become the band's third consecutive UK top ten single, but XL Recordings deleted it from its catalogue and therefore stalled at its peak of No. 11.

By early 1993, the Prodigy had completed their first major nationwide tour. Howlett said that the Prodigy had now become an established act and would continue to produce original dance music as there was still an audience for it. After Experience and the run of singles that accompanied it, the band moved to distance themselves from the "kiddie rave" reputation that had dogged them. The rave scene moved on from its hardcore phase, following the Criminal Justice Act's anti-rave legislation on the horizon. Later in 1993, Howlett released an anonymous white label vinyl, bearing only the titles "Earthbound I" and "Earthbound 2". Its hypnotic, hard-edged sound won wide underground approval. The songs were officially released as "One Love" and "Full Throttle" in September 1993, and reached No. 8 in the UK. By this time the band performed live at least once a week, and had started performing overseas including Germany, the US, and Japan.

In 1993, Howlett started work on the band's second album, Music for the Jilted Generation. Much of the new material was written in response to the Criminal Justice Act as exemplified by "Their Law", co-written and performed with alternative rock band Pop Will Eat Itself. The album opens with a spoken introduction: "So I've decided to take my work back underground to stop it falling into the wrong hands". Howlett explained that "the wrong hands" represented people who considered the Prodigy as a commercial band, and no longer wanted the group to be seen as purely a rave act. It displays a wider range of musical styles and structures with heavy breakbeat-based tracks and the conceptual three-part song "The Narcotic Suite". The Guardian called it a "complex, powerful record that propelled dance music into stadiums with rock'n'roll swagger".

Released in July 1994, the album entered the UK chart at No. 1 and received positive reactions from critics. It was nominated for a Mercury Music Prize, although Howlett had reaffirmed his dedication to making the Prodigy a "hard dance band" commercially successful but without compromise. The band avoided mainstream exposure, declining offers to appear on Top of the Pops and other national television shows in the UK. Their performance of "Everybody in the Place" on the BBC2 television series Dance Energy in 1991 remains their only one on British television. In the ensuing years, their music videos received airplay on MTV Europe which boosted their popularity across the continent.

Following the international success of Music for the Jilted Generation, the band augmented their line-up with guitarist Jim Davies (a live band member who later joined the group Pitchshifter) in 1995 for tracks such as "Their Law", "Break and Enter 95", and various live-only interludes and versions. He was soon to be replaced by Gizz Butt of the band Janus Stark, who remained with the band for the next three years.

=== Commercial peak with The Fat of the Land and Thornhill's departure (1995–2001) ===
In March 1996, the Prodigy released the single "Firestarter", which marked their first song with a full vocal. Howlett had originally recorded it as an instrumental and thought to incorporate a vocal sample, but upon hearing the track Flint was keen to write and record his own lyric. This surprised Howlett at first, but he agreed to try; Flint said the result sounded "quite ... menacing". The track gained controversy in the UK for its suggestive lyrics; Flint said the father of the first female firefighter to die in a fire complained that the song was disrespectful, which prompted The Daily Mail to attack the band by carrying a front page headline calling for the song to be banned. Howlett clarified that the lyrics are not literal and direct, and Flint said the track is about "stirring people up". Nevertheless, BBC radio presenter Chris Evans refused to air the song on his show, and the Prodigy turned down money to have the music video edited so it could air on Top of the Pops, following multiple complaints.

Despite the controversy "Firestarter" marked the beginning of the band's commercial peak, becoming their first UK number one single which it topped for three consecutive weeks. It was also a top-10 hit worldwide and their US breakthrough, peaking at number 30. The music video marked the debut of Flint's radically different appearance, sporting his soon-to-be iconic punk look with nose and tongue piercings, tattoos, and dyed hair, and his shift from dancer to frontman. The Prodigy followed "Firestarter" with the single "Breathe" in November 1996, which also went to number one in the UK and eight other countries. Both singles sold 1.2 million copies each in the UK.

In late 1996, several US record labels created a bidding war in an effort to sign the Prodigy to a deal. Richard Russell, co-owner of the group's UK label XL Recordings, met with several executives and recalled Guy Oseary of Maverick Records, owned by American singer Madonna, who attended several meetings herself, as the most determined. The estimated $5 million deal was announced in February 1997, an unprecedented amount for a rave influenced act, with the press suggesting the bidding war involved over 20 labels. In May 1997, a private event was held in Essex for record executives to hear the band's long-awaited studio album The Fat of the Land, although it was still unfinished. "Firestarter" and "Breathe" were added to the album.

The Fat of the Land was released on 30 June 1997, and featured simplified melodies, sparser sampling, less rave influences and punk-like vocals. It had a strong commercial impact, entering the UK and US album charts at number one and earned a Guinness World Record as the fastest selling dance album in the UK with 317,000 copies sold in the first week. It remains the band's highest selling album with 1.5 million copies sold in the UK, 2.6 million sold in the US, and an estimated 10 million worldwide. The Prodigy capitalised on their commercial success with a full scale UK tour and their first of the US in four years. In June 1997, they headlined the Glastonbury Festival on its opening night and from June to August, headlined Lollapalooza. In September 1997, the Prodigy performed "Breathe" at the 1997 MTV Video Music Awards and won the Viewer's Choice Award. At the 1998 MTV Video Music Awards, "Smack My Bitch Up" won two awards—Best Dance Video and Breakthrough Video.

"Smack My Bitch Up" generated significant controversy for its suggestive lyrics and music video. The National Organization for Women claimed the repeated phrase "Change my pitch up, smack my bitch up" was a "dangerous and offensive message advocating violence against women" and that it refers to someone administering heroin (smack) to another person. The phrase is a sample from "Give the Drummer Some" by hip hop group Ultramagnetic MCs. Howlett stated that the song was misinterpreted and that the phrase meant "doing anything intensely, like being on stage—going for extreme manic energy". Several radio stations limited the song's airplay to nighttime hours. US chains Wal-Mart and Kmart deemed the marketing campaign for the single offensive and pulled The Fat of the Land off their shelves. At the 1998 Reading Festival, the Prodigy and the Beastie Boys had an onstage disagreement, with the Beastie Boys requesting "Smack My Bitch Up" be pulled from the set as it could be considered offensive to those who had suffered domestic abuse. The Prodigy ignored the plea; Maxim introduced the song: "They didn't want us to play this fucking tune. But the way things go, I do what the fuck I want".

1999 saw the release of the Prodigy's The Dirtchamber Sessions Volume One, a mix album by Howlett produced as an official record of a guest DJ appearance on BBC Radio 1. The original session came into being following a conversation between journalism and band biographer Martin James and Breezeblock presenter Mary Anne Hobbs. They are subsequently both thanked on the album sleeve notes.

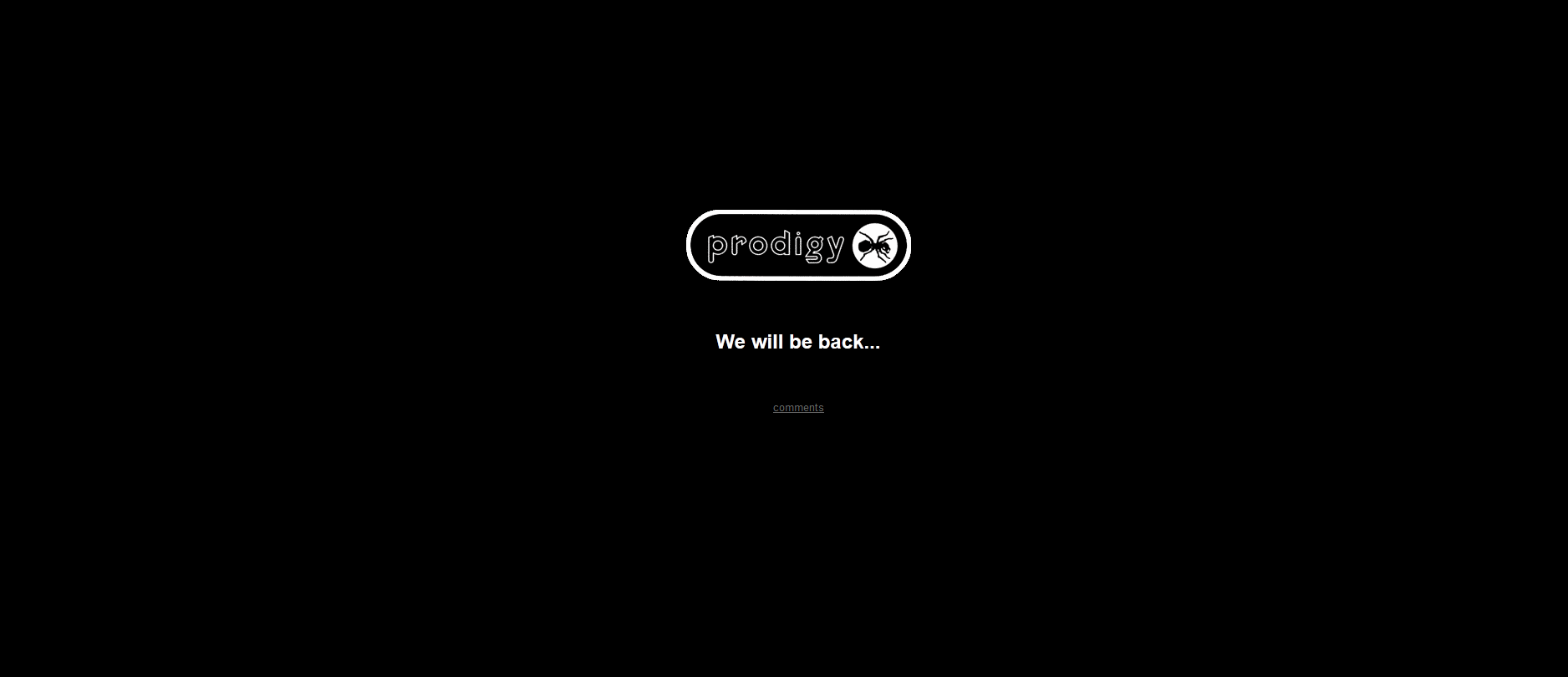
The band's website after Thornhill left in 2000

In August 1999, the band wrapped their world tour in support of The Fat of the Land and the group parted ways with touring guitarist Gizz Butt. Following a rest period, Thornhill's departure from the group was announced in a statement published in April 2000. He said that the mood within the band had changed and was increasingly dissatisfied with them on stage, and wanted to pursue solo projects. Howlett said: "We are both into different things and moving in different directions but I respect him and wish him good luck with what he does." The band's website was replaced with their logo and the words "We will be back..." set against a black background, which would remain until 2002.

=== Always Outnumbered, Never Outgunned (2001–2008) ===
After the group performed some live shows in 2001, their single "Baby's Got a Temper" was released in July 2002 to critical disappointment. The original version of the song was written by Flint's sideband Flint, and was called "NNNN". The Prodigy version was a total reworking of Flint's track with only a few of the lyrics and melody remaining from the original and produced by Howlett. The song also featured Jim Davies. Once again, the band courted controversy by including references to the "date rape" drug Rohypnol in the song's lyrics. The song's music video was also controversial, which featured barely covered women milking cows in a suggestive fashion. The complete, unedited video was aired on MTV2 in 2002 as part of a special late-night countdown showing the most controversial videos ever to air on MTV. In the same year, however, Q magazine named the Prodigy one of the "50 Bands to See Before You Die".

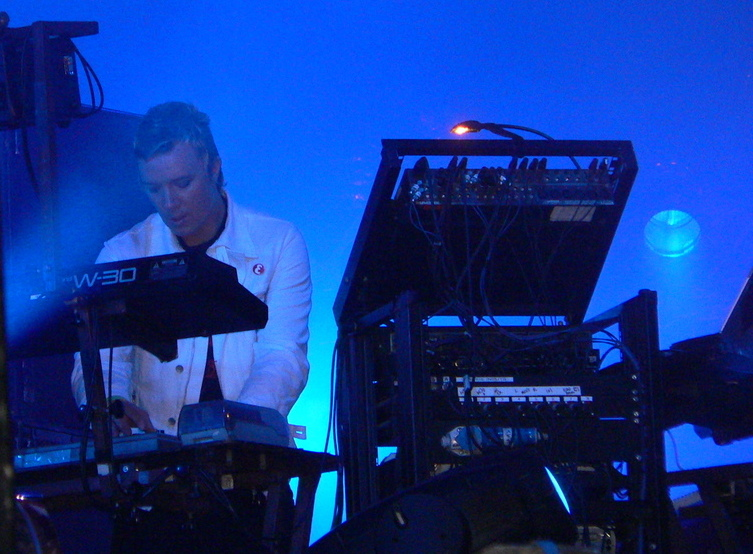
Liam Howlett live in August 2005

The Prodigy's fourth studio album, Always Outnumbered, Never Outgunned, was released on 23 August 2004, and 14 September 2004 in the US. A precursory and experimental single, "Memphis Bells", was released in very limited numbers, followed by the traditional release of the single "Girls". The US version of the studio album contained a remix of "Girls", entitled "More Girls", as a bonus track. The album, which topped the UK Albums Chart in its debut week, was promoted by a two-year-long tour.

5,000 digital copies of "Memphis Bells" were sold over the Internet. Each copy was a combination of customer-chosen instrumental, rhythmic, and melodic options, of which 39,600 choices were available. Five mixes were sold in three file formats: WAV, two audio mixes in MP3, and a 5.1 DTS surround sound mix, and all were free of digital rights management.

In 2005, the band released a compilation Their Law: The Singles 1990–2005, which spawned a single containing new remixes of the songs "Out of Space" ("Audio Bullys Remix") and "Voodoo People" (the "Pendulum Remix"). The latter was also followed by a music video filmed in Romford Market, Essex, which featured on the DVD release of the compilation. Sharky, the group's only female member, is shown running and winning the race depicted in the video. Also in 2005 the song "You'll be Under my Wheels" from the Always Outnumbered, Never Outgunned album was added to the soundtrack of Need for Speed: Most Wanted. The cover artwork included an extended essay by band biographer Martin James.

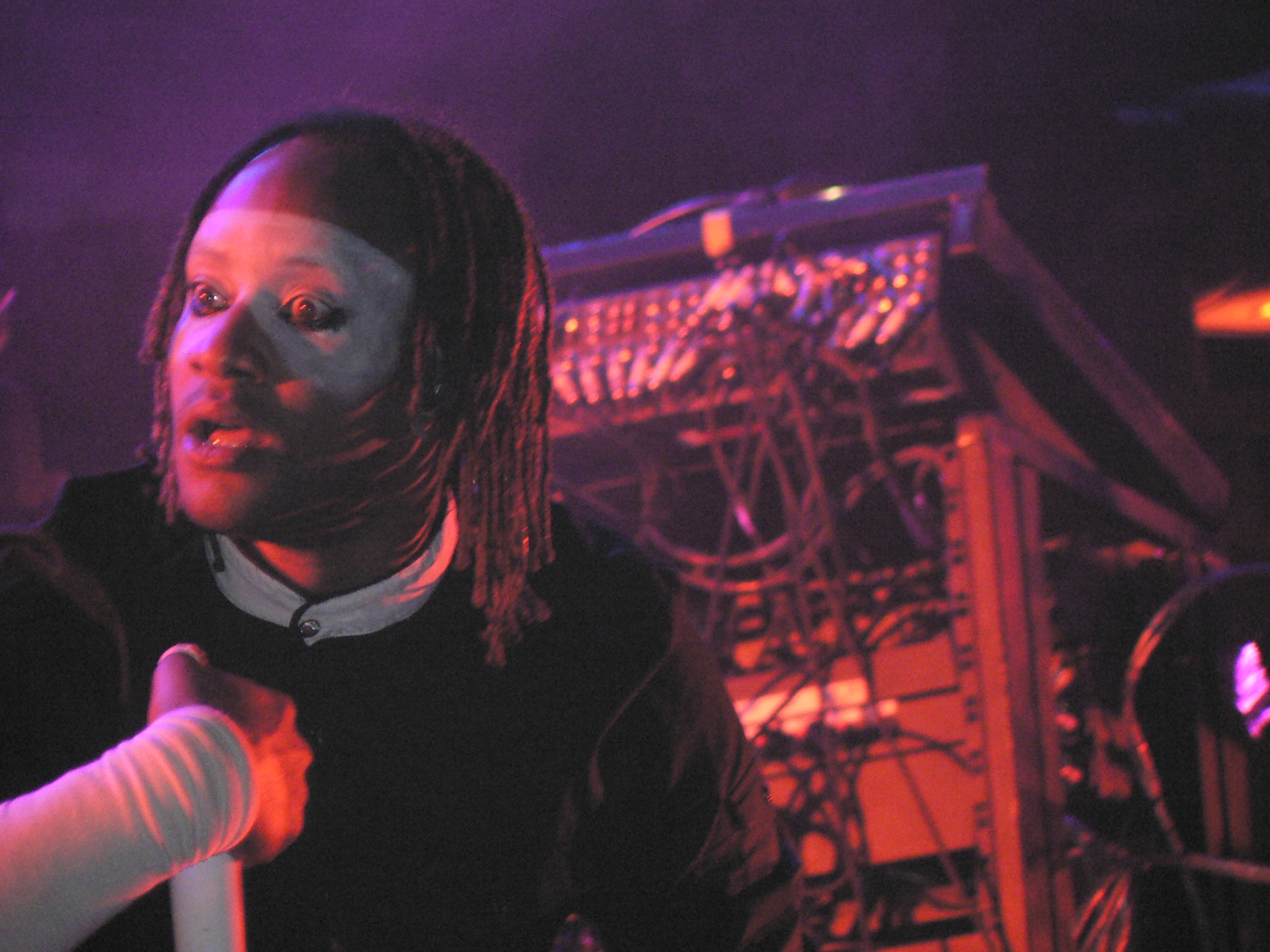
Maxim performing at the 2006 Sziget Festival

The Prodigy's first two albums, 1992's Experience and 1994's Music for the Jilted Generation, were re-released in expanded, deluxe editions on 4 August 2008. As well as being remastered, the new packages featured a bonus disc including mixes, rarities, and live tracks. The two albums also featured expanded artwork in addition to the new musical content.

About the re-release process, Howlett said, "We didn't actually want to do the Greatest Hits, we were ready to start our new record—until the record company pointed out that it was in the contract. But then we got into it, and tried to be creative with it as much as [we could]. And, you know, we ended up being really proud of it. You have to have a different brain when you're doing a record like that. It's more about [saying] 'this is your achievement'; I could hold in one hand all the records we've released, so that was cool. We're moving on now, and getting on with the new record.

=== Invaders Must Die (2008–2010) ===
The Prodigy tested a few of the new tracks at Rainbow Warehouse Birmingham and Plug in Sheffield in May 2008.

The Prodigy showcased three new songs at the Oxegen Festival in the early hours of 13 July 2008. Among the tracks previewed were "World's on Fire", "Warrior's Dance", and "Mescaline".

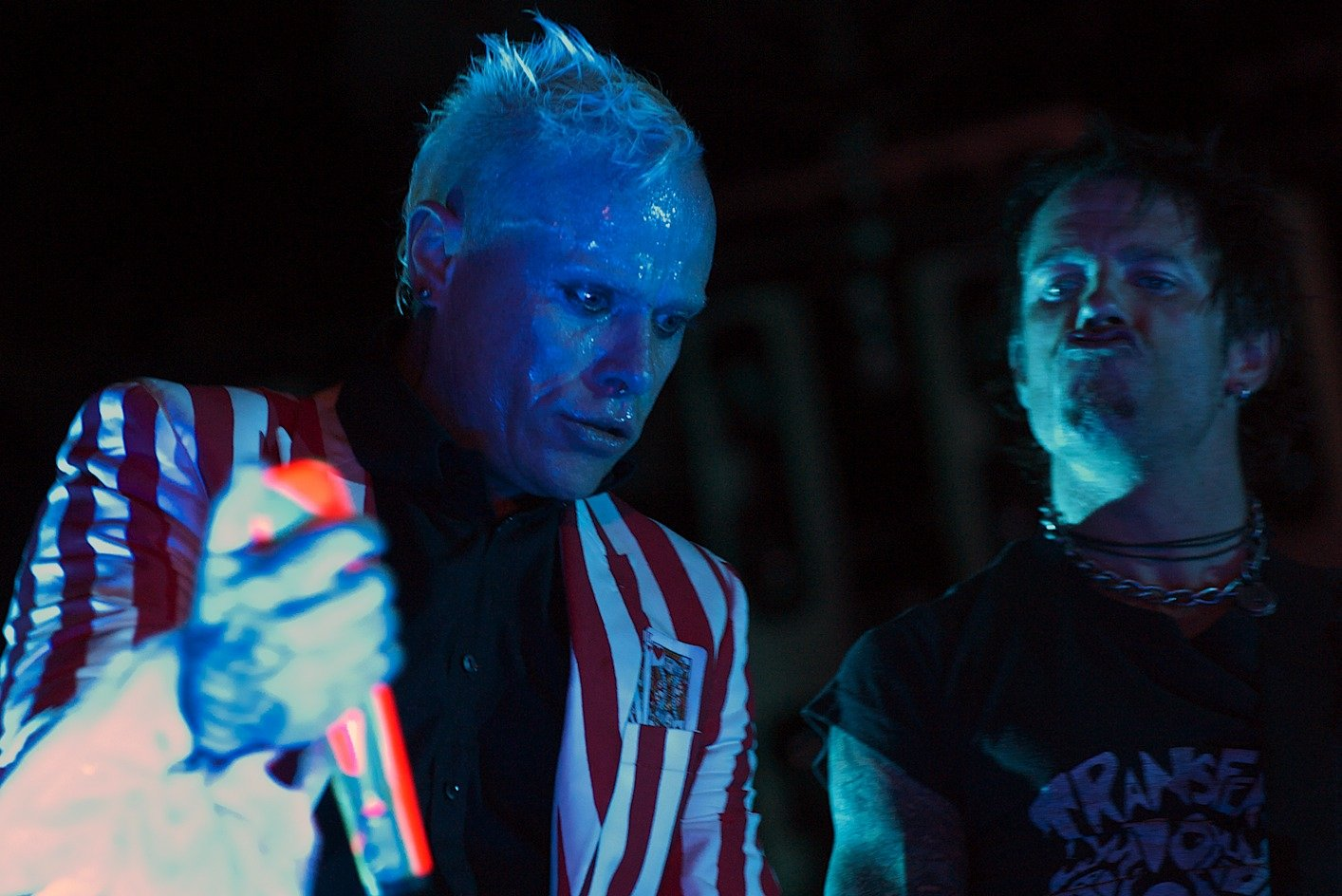
The Prodigy frontman Keith Flint and live member Rob Holliday

On 5 November 2008, it was announced that the band's fifth studio album would be called Invaders Must Die and would be released on the band's new label, Take Me to the Hospital. It was released in the U.S. on 3 March 2009, and was the first Prodigy album since 1997's The Fat of the Land to feature all three members of the band.

The album featured Dave Grohl on drums for "Run with the Wolves". The top five hit "Omen" and "Invaders Must Die" were co-produced with Does It Offend You, Yeah? frontman James Rushent. The band said that the album would go back to their "old-school but cutting edge" roots. The album was released as a CD, CD-DVD set, double vinyl, digital download, and a luxury 7-inch vinyl box set including five 7-inches, CD-DVD, bonus CD, poster, stickers, and stencils.

Invaders Must Die was released on 21 February 2009 in Australia and in Europe on 23 February 2009, charting at number one in the U.K. with week one sales of over 97,000—a higher figure than for either Always Outnumbered or their singles collection. The album also reached the top five in Germany and Australia and top 10 in Norway and several other European countries.

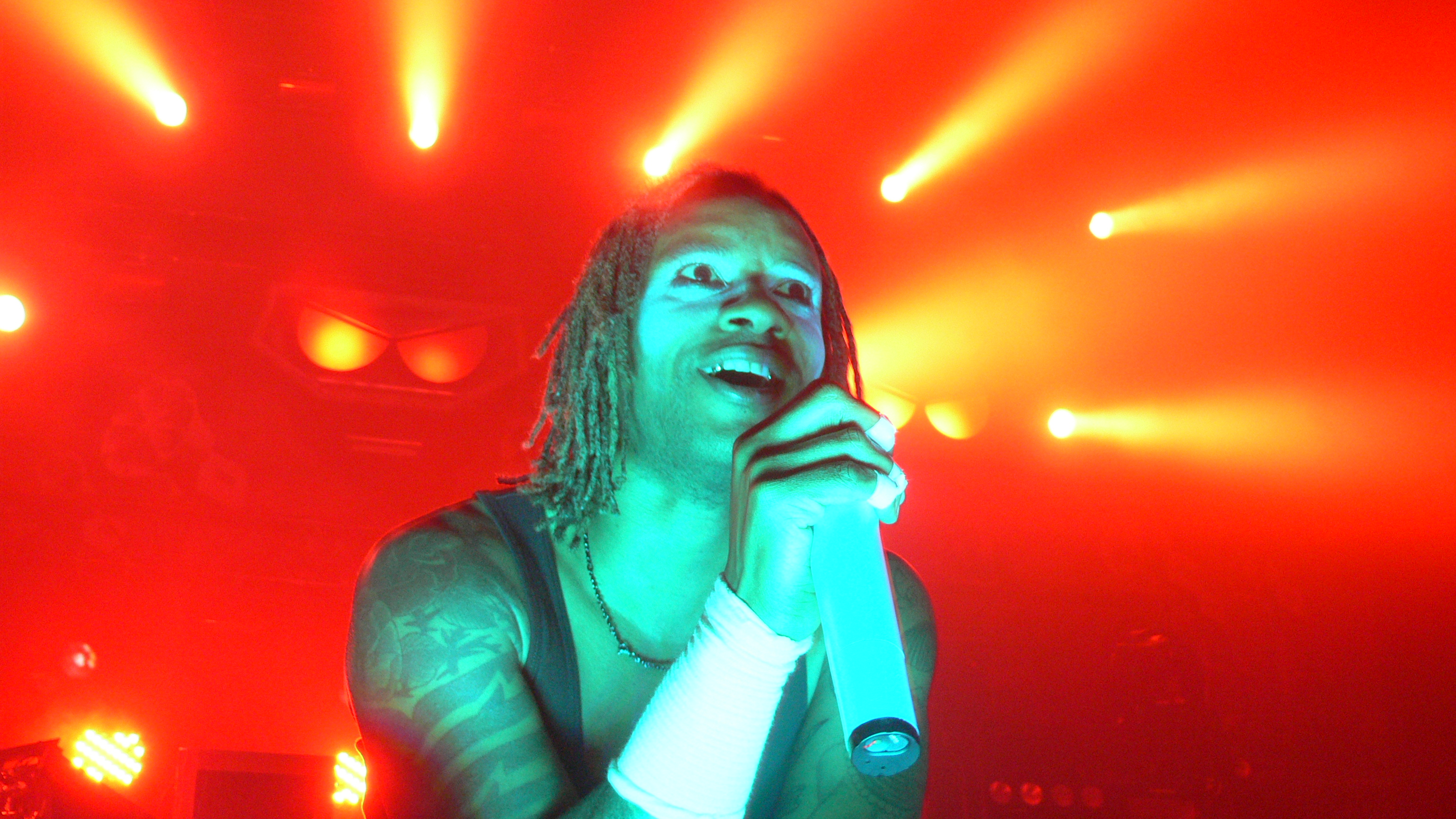
Maxim performing in 2009

To coincide with the release of the album, the band embarked on a nine-date UK arena tour, with support from Dizzee Rascal, Noisia, Hervé, and DJ Kissy Sell Out. The tour included the first edition of the band's own annual dance gig, the Warriors Dance Festival. The single "Omen" debuted at number 1 on the Canadian Singles Chart the week of 25 February 2009 and won the Kerrang! Award for Best Single. The initial critical response to Invaders Must Die was somewhat mixed. At Metacritic, which assigns a normalized rating out of 100 to reviews from mainstream critics, the album received an average score of 60, based on 20 reviews. However, the album was well received by the fans, who welcomed it in a positive light compared to Always Outnumbered, Never Outgunned. Two singles followed, "Warrior's Dance" and "Take Me to the Hospital", which were released on 11 May and 31 August 2009 respectively. The former song peaked at number 9 on the UK Singles Chart, while the latter included a VHS-filmed music video that premiered on VidZone. A fourth single, "Invaders Must Die (Liam H Reamped Version)", from the Special Edition of the album, was released. Howlett would later describe the album as "more of a celebration. We'd come back together and were like, 'Yeah! We're here, we're really buzzing!"

In the same year, Howlett co-produced the song "Immunize" on Pendulum's third album, Immersion.

The band also played Glastonbury in 2009.

=== The Day Is My Enemy (2010–2015) ===
In May 2011, the band released World's on Fire, their first live album and concert film documenting their 24 July 2010 show at the Milton Keynes Bowl as part of that year's Warriors Dance Festival. The film screened to select theatres across Europe for one night. On 16 November 2010, Howlett announced that after their American tour with Linkin Park, the Prodigy were to re-enter the studio to record new material.

On 6 August 2011, the Prodigy headlined the Przystanek Woodstock in Poland, while at their two final shows of 2011 in Brazil, they premiered two new tracks: "A.W.O.L" and "Dogbite". They headlined the 2012 Download Festival on 8 June playing a regular setlist, with the addition of three new songs, "Jetfighter", "Dogbite" and "A.W.O.L", accompanied by on-stage imagery of jet aircraft. Howlett has confirmed this album will not be dubstep, but that it will feel "fresh" whilst darker. In April 2012, to commemorate the fifteenth anniversary of The Fat of the Land, the album was re-released alongside a remix EP, The Added Fat EP, featuring remixes from multiple groups such as Major Lazer, Noisia, and Zeds Dead.

On 3 May 2012, the Prodigy announced the working title of their new album How to Steal a Jetfighter. In December 2012, a new track titled "The Day" was debuted at Warrior's Brixton and in June 2013, a new track titled "Rockweiler" was debuted at Rock am Ring. The band headlined the Sonisphere Festival at Knebworth in 2014. On 2 July 2014, the band revealed their upcoming album would have a different name and a "violent sound". In August 2014, they signed to the Three Six Zero Group for the United States, returning to Warner Music for the first time since 2004. Maxim indicated in September 2014 that the new Prodigy album would be released in the first quarter of 2015. It was later announced on 6 January 2015 that the next Prodigy album would be releasing 30 March 2015 and that it had been given the title The Day Is My Enemy.

On 12 January 2015, the Prodigy released "Nasty" as the lead single from their upcoming album along with the title track on 26 January 2015. Howlett found that "violent is the word that keeps on coming up" when describing the album. The entire recording process took almost six years taking in a number of studios and a few restarts to establish that "angry, energetic sound". Unlike previous efforts, The Day Is My Enemy became a band-album where Flint and Maxim worked in tandem with Howlett. This created a degree of friction although Flint noted that "four years ago we sat down and talked about where the next album was gonna go, and we knew we had to bust out the most 'band' album we could create".

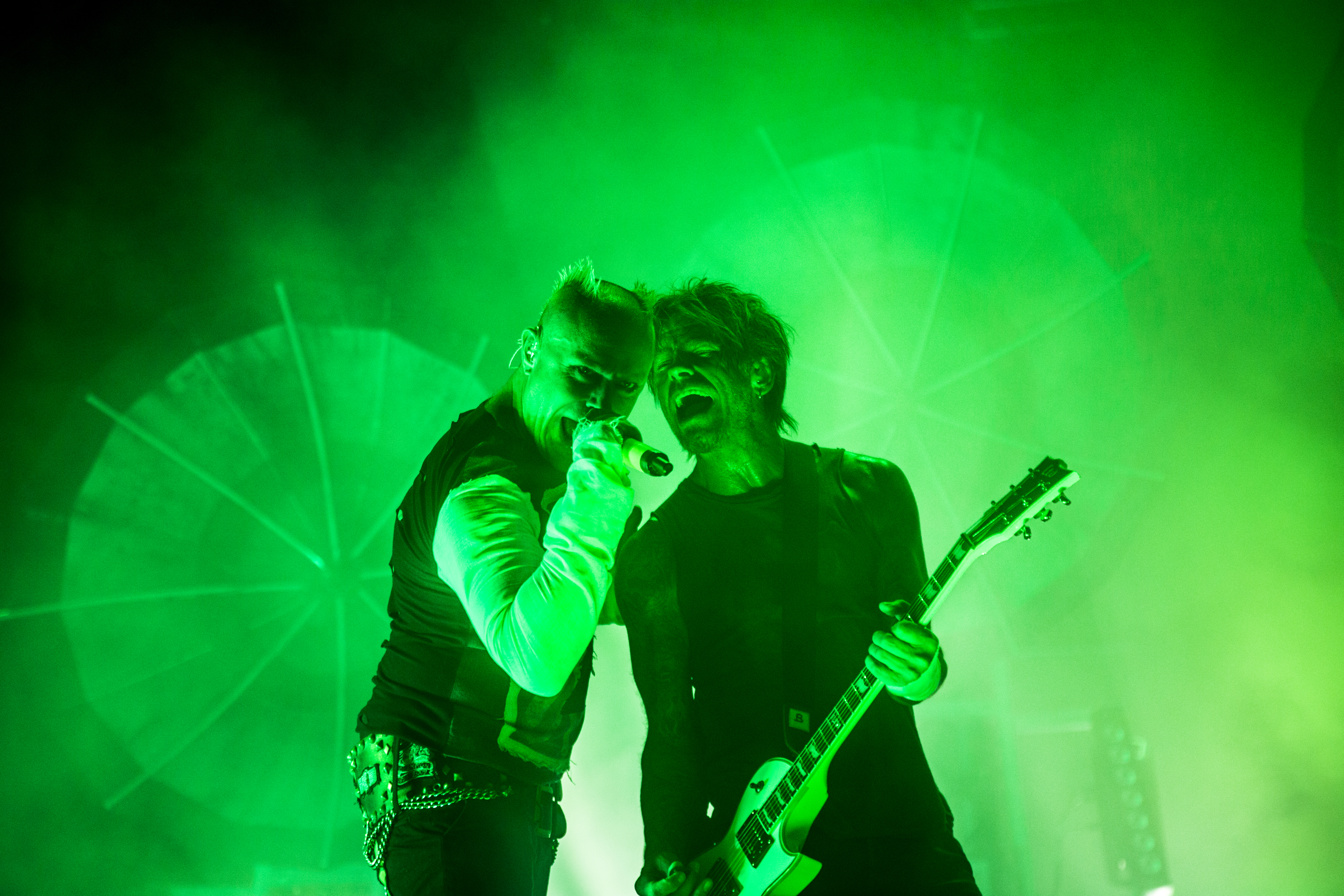
The Prodigy at Festival Internacional de Benicàssim 2015

The band played at Future Music Festival Australia in February–March 2015 and toured Germany and France in April 2015 and the UK in May 2015. They also performed at the Rock Werchter, Rock am Ring/Rock im Park, Benicàssim and Isle of Wight festivals.

On 23 February 2015, the Prodigy released "Wild Frontier" as the second single from their upcoming album The Day Is My Enemy after announcing it three days earlier. The stop-motion animation video was directed by the Dutch filmmaker Mascha Halberstad and animator Elmer Kaan. The cover art was designed by Austrian artist and designer Moritz Resl. In May 2015, the Prodigy announced a winter 2015 UK and mainland Europe tour, with Public Enemy as support.

=== No Tourists, Flint's death and hiatus (2016–2021) ===
The Prodigy's seventh studio album, No Tourists, was released on 2 November 2018 under a new recording deal with BMG Rights Management. The deal reunited the group with Howlett's song publishing, which BMG had acquired from EMI Music Publishing in 2012 as part of the Virgin Music catalogue.

On 4 March 2019, Flint was found dead at his home in Essex, weeks after the band had toured Australia and New Zealand. The rest of the Prodigy's tour dates were cancelled. Following Flint's death, fans began using the Twitter hashtag "Firestarter4Number1" on various social media platforms to get "Firestarter" to number one on the UK singles chart out of respect for Flint and to raise awareness of suicide among men. In August 2020, Howlett said that the Prodigy will continue. Former member Leeroy Thornhill said that Howlett had been working on a new Prodigy album at the time of Flint's death, and wishes to complete it as a tribute to Flint. On 10 February 2021, the band announced their plans to begin production on a documentary film about the band's history, with an as-yet unknown title and release date. It will be directed by long time collaborator Paul Dugdale and produced by Pulse Films.

=== Return to stage and upcoming eighth album (2022–present) ===
On 7 March 2022, the Prodigy announced a return to the stage with a 10-date tour of the UK in July to coincide with the 25th anniversary of The Fat of the Land, also hinting that new material would be performed on the tour. On 28 October 2022, the band announced they would be returning to live shows outside of the UK for the first time in four years, stating that in 2023 new dates were added, including the festival circuit, with a June date in Austria confirmed among others.

On 19 February 2025, after the 'Disrupta' tour ended in Australia, the Prodigy confirmed on social media that a new album is coming. This came after two new songs were played by the band on the tour, and on the UK tour in the months prior. On 24 June 2025, the band announced that they would be embarking on a 10 date UK tour in mid-late April 2026, with Carl Cox as support playing a 2 hour, 3 deck vinyl set every night of the tour.

The Prodigy plans to release a new album in 2027 with Howlett describing their new style as "evil rave". The announcement was accompanied by news of their "Warrior Dance" music festival, with tickets going on sale in November 2025. On April 8, 2026, the band released a remix of the song "Elitest G.O.A.T." by Sleaford Mods from their album The Demise of Planet X, with a physical 7-inch vinyl single made available for pre-order before its release on June 26. Sleaford Mods member Jason Williamson praised the remix, stating that it "turns [the song] into another tune entirely."

On 22 August 2026, the Prodigy performed at the National Bowl in Milton Keynes. On 30 August 2026, the Prodigy performed at Wythenshawe Park, Manchester for the Warrior's Dance festival.

== Musical style and influences ==
Along with the Chemical Brothers and Fatboy Slim, the Prodigy are pioneers of the big beat genre, which achieved mainstream popularity in the 1990s. The Prodigy as their production "often reflected the more intelligent edge of trip-hop, and rarely broke into the mindless arena of true big beat" according to AllMusic. The Prodigy are also considered techno, alternative dance, electronic rock, electropunk, rave, dance-rock, electronica, breakbeat hardcore, industrial, rap rock, and rock.

Liam Howlett cited early electro as a big influence, mentioning tunes like "Clear" by American music group Cybotron and "Al Naafiysh" by Hashim. He also cited the Bomb Squad, Public Enemy, and Rage Against the Machine as influences.

== Band members ==
Current members

- Liam Howlett – keyboards, synthesizers, programming, production, sampling, sequencing, turntables, drum machine, guitars, bass, drums (1990–present)
- Maxim (Keith Palmer) – vocals, beatboxing (1991–present)

Current live musicians

- Rob Holliday – guitars, bass (2005–2006, 2008–2017, 2022–present)
- Leo Crabtree – drums, percussion (2008–present)

Former members

- Keith Flint – dancing (1990–2019); vocals (1995–2019; died 2019)
- Leeroy Thornhill – dancing (1990–2000); occasional live keyboards, synthesizers (1994–2000)
- Sharky (Sheila Burke) – dancing (1990–1991)

Former live musicians

- Jim Davies – guitars (1994–1996, 2002–2004)
- Gizz Butt – guitars (1996–1999)
- Kieron Pepper – drums, percussion, occasional guitars (1997–2007)
- Alli MacInnes – guitars (2001–2002)
- Rev (Paul Mayers) – guitars (2007)
- Snell (Neal Eldridge) – drums, percussion (2007)
- Brian Fairbairn – drums, percussion (2007)
- Ben Weinman – guitars, bass (2017)
- Olly Burden – guitars, bass (2017–2019)

=== Timeline ===
Touring members

== Discography ==
Studio albums

- Experience (1992)
- Music for the Jilted Generation (1994)
- The Fat of the Land (1997)
- Always Outnumbered, Never Outgunned (2004)
- Invaders Must Die (2009)
- The Day Is My Enemy (2015)
- No Tourists (2018)
