= Liam Howlett =

English musician (born 1971)

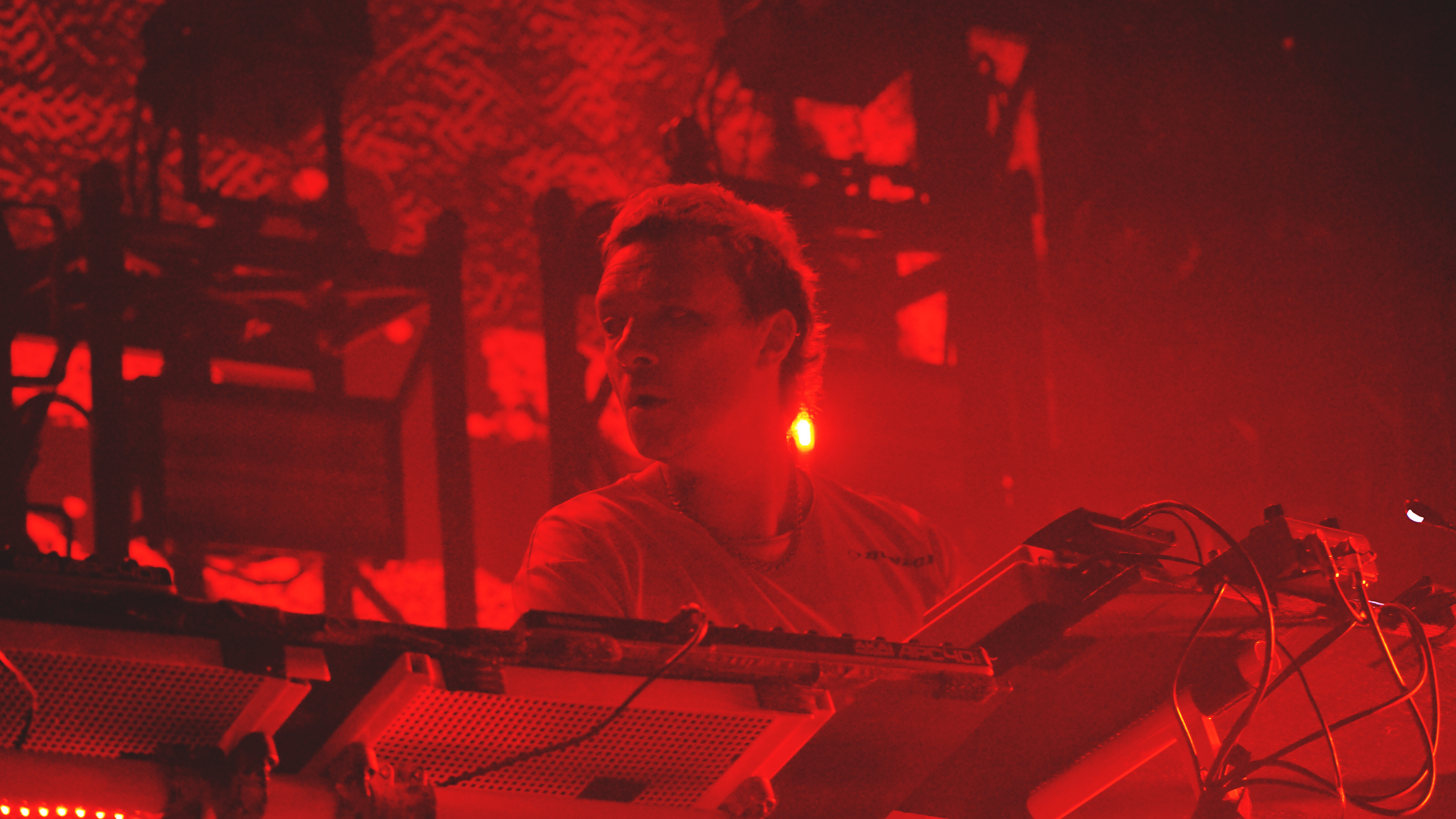
- Howlett at the O2 Academy Leeds on 14 July 2022

Background information
- Born: Liam Paul Paris Howlett; 21 August 1971 (age 55); Braintree, Essex, England
- Genres: Big beat; electronica; alternative rock; electropunk; hardcore techno; breakbeat hardcore
- Occupations: Musician; DJ; record producer; songwriter
- Instruments: Synthesizers; keyboards; drums; sampler; turntables
- Years active: 1990–present
- Member of: The Prodigy
- Formerly of: Cut 2 Kill
- Spouse: Natalie Appleton (m. 2002)
- Children: 1

Liam Paul Paris Howlett (born 21 August 1971) is an English musician, producer, songwriter, and DJ. He is the founder, songwriter, producer, and leader of the electronic band the Prodigy.

== Early years ==
Liam Paul Paris Howlett was born on 21 August 1971 in Braintree, Essex, England. Howlett was trained in classical piano from childhood.

== Career ==
=== The Prodigy ===
Howlett formed the Prodigy in 1990.

=== Other musical projects ===
In 1998, Howlett was offered the chance to create a mix for Mary Anne Hobbs' radio show. His mix featured his favourite tracks and was released in edited form, because of copyright issues, in February 1999. The mix was the first material to be recorded in his then new home-studio "The Dirtchamber" and was named The Prodigy present The Dirtchamber Sessions Volume One.

In 1999, Howlett composed music for the film The Uranus Experiment, which was described as an "anal space opera" and featured the first sex scene to be shot in microgravity.

At the end of January 2006, a compilation album titled Back to Mine: Liam Prodigy was released. It was a collection of Howlett's favourite tracks and also included an otherwise unreleased Prodigy track called "Wake the Fuck Up" which had been performed as an introduction during the Prodigy's live concerts.

Howlett was a co-producer on the track "Immunize" from Australian drum and bass act Pendulum's third album Immersion, which was released in 2010.

In 2012, Howlett co-produced the first single "We Hate Everyone" from K.Flay's EP Eyes Shut. He also produced the song "Stop, Focus" from the same EP.

On 30 March 2022, it was announced that Howlett would compose the musical score for the Netflix film Choose or Die.

== Personal life ==
Howlett has been married to Natalie Appleton of All Saints since 2002. They have a son, born in 2004, and live in Hampstead, London.
