= List of awards and nominations received by the Prodigy =

This is a list of awards and nominations received by The Prodigy.

== Berlin Music Video Awards ==
Year	Nominee/work	Award	Result
2015	Wild Frontier	Best Animation	Won
2019	NEED SOME1	Most Trashy	Nominated
2024	Invaders Must Die	Best Editor	Nominated

== Bravo Otto Awards ==
Year	Nominee / work	Award	Result
1993	The Prodigy	Rap & Techno (Bronze)	Won
1994	The Prodigy	Rap & Techno (Bronze)	Won

== Brit Awards ==
Year	Nominee / work	Award	Result
1995	The Prodigy	Best British Dance Act	Nominated
1997	"Firestarter"	Best British Single	Nominated
1997	"Firestarter"	Best British Video	Nominated
1997	"Breathe"	Best British Video	Nominated
1997	The Prodigy	Best British Dance Act	Won
1998	The Fat of the Land	MasterCard British Album	Nominated
1998	The Prodigy	Best British Group	Nominated
1998	The Prodigy	Best British Dance Act	Won

== Grammy Awards ==
Year	Nominee / work	Award	Result
1998	The Fat of the Land	Best Alternative Music Performance	Nominated
2005	Always Outnumbered, Never Outgunned	Best Electronic/Dance Album	Nominated

== Hungarian Music Awards ==
Year	Nominee / work	Award	Result
1998	The Fat of the Land	Best Foreign Album	Nominated
2005	Always Outnumbered, Never Outgunned	Best Foreign Dance Album	Nominated

== Independent Music Awards ==
Year	Nominee / work	Award	Result
2012	The Prodigy	Best Live Act	Won

== International Dance Music Awards ==
Year	Nominee / work	Award	Result
2006	"Voodoo People"	Best Breaks/DnB Track	Won
2009	"Omen"	Best Dubstep/DnB/Jungle Track	Nominated
2016	"Nasty"	Best Dubstep/DnB/Jungle Track	Nominated

== Ivor Novello Awards ==
Year	Nominee / work	Award	Result
1997	"Firestarter"	Best Contemporary Song	Nominated

== Lunas del Auditorio ==
Year	Nominee / work	Award	Result
2006	The Prodigy	Musica Electronica	Nominated
2010	The Prodigy	Musica Electronica	Nominated

== MTV Video Music Awards ==
Year	Nominee / work	Award	Result
1997	"Breathe"	Best Dance Video	Nominated
1997	"Breathe"	Viewer's Choice	Won
1997	"Breathe"	International Viewer's Choice Award for MTV Europe	Won
1998	"Smack My Bitch Up"	Best Dance Video	Won
1998	"Smack My Bitch Up"	Breakthrough Video	Won
1998	"Smack My Bitch Up"	Best Direction in a Video (Director: Jonas Åkerlund)	Nominated
1998	"Smack My Bitch Up"	Best Editing in a Video (Editor: Jonas Åkerlund)	Nominated

== MTV Europe Music Awards ==
Year	Nominee / work	Award	Result
1994	The Prodigy	Best Dance	Won
1995	Music for the Jilted Generation Tour	Best Live Act	Nominated
1996	The Prodigy	Best Dance	Won
1997	"Breathe"	Best Video	Won
1997	The Prodigy	Best Group	Nominated
1997	The Prodigy	Best Dance	Won
1997	The Prodigy	Best Alternative	Won
1998	The Prodigy	Best Dance	Won
2004	The Prodigy	Best Alternative	Nominated
2009	The Prodigy	Best Alternative	Nominated

== MOBO Awards ==
Year	Nominee / work	Award	Result
1997	The Prodigy	Best Dance Act	Won

== MVPA Awards ==
Year	Nominee / work	Award	Result
1998	"Smack My Bitch Up"	Video of the Year	Won
1998	"Smack My Bitch Up"	Best Editing	Won
2007	"Smack My Bitch Up"	MVPA Hall of Fame	Won

== Mercury Prize ==
Year	Nominee / work	Award	Result
1994	Music for the Jilted Generation	Album of the Year	Nominated
1997	The Fat of the Land	Album of the Year	Nominated

== Music Television Awards ==
Year	Nominee / work	Award	Result
1994	Music for the Jilted Generation	Best Album	Nominated
1994	"No Good (Start the Dance)"	Best Video	Nominated
1994	Themselves	Best New Act	Nominated
1995	Themselves	Best Alternative	Nominated
1996	Themselves	Best Alternative	Nominated
1996	Themselves	Best Group	Nominated
1996	Themselves	Best Dance Act	Won
1997	Themselves	Best Dance Act	Won
1997	Themselves	Best Group	Won
1997	Themselves	Best Alternative	Nominated
1997	"Breathe"	Best Video	Won
1998	"Smack My Bitch Up"	Best Video	Nominated
1998	The Fat of the Land	Best Album	Nominated
1998	The Prodigy	Best Group	Nominated
1998	The Prodigy	Best Dance Act	Won
2004	The Prodigy	Best Dance Act	Nominated
2004	The Prodigy	Best Group	Nominated
2004	The Prodigy	Best Alternative	Nominated
2005	The Prodigy	Best Alternative	Nominated

== NME Awards ==
Year	Nominee / work	Award	Result
1996	The Prodigy	Best Dance Act	Won
1997	The Prodigy	Best Dance Act	Won
1997	"Firestarter"	Best Video	Won
1998	Themselves	Best Dance Act	Won
1998	"Smack My Bitch Up"	Best Dance Single	Won
2013	The Fat of the Land	Best Reissue	Nominated

== Q Awards ==
Year	Nominee / work	Award	Result
1997	The Prodigy	Best Live Act	Won
2009	The Prodigy	Best Live Act	Nominated
2009	Invaders Must Die	Best Album	Nominated

== UK Festival Awards ==
Year	Nominee / work	Award	Result
2008	The Prodigy	Festival Dance Act	Nominated
2013	The Prodigy	Headline Performance of the Year	Nominated

== UK Music Video Awards ==
Year	Nominee / work	Award	Result
2009	"Warrior's Dance"	Best Dance Video	Nominated
2009	"Warrior's Dance"	Best Animation	Nominated
2009	"Omen"	Best Editing	Nominated
2009	"Invaders Must Die"	Best Live Music Coverage	Nominated
2010	"Take Me to the Hospital"	Best Live Music Coverage	Won
