= Electronic Punks =

Video by The Prodigy
- Released: 10 July 1995
- Recorded: 1995
- Length: 97:40
- Language: English
- Label: XL
- Producer: Mad Dog Films

Electronic Punks is a 1995 video by the British electronic band The Prodigy. It was released on VHS in 1995 and broadcast on MTV. It includes videos, live performances and rehearsals.

The live sections of the video were recorded on dates of the band's Poison tour: at The Apollo in Manchester, The De Montfort Hall in Leicester, The Town & Country Club in Leeds, and The Brighton Centre in Brighton. After the final credits of the video (which are accompanied by the rare The Prodigy track "We Eat Rhythm") there is a documentary of making of the music video to The Prodigy track "Poison".

The video reached number 3 in the UK music-video chart.

== Track listing ==
1. "Voodoo People"
2. "Rock and Roll" (Live)
3. "Out of Space"
4. Break and Enter 95" (Live)
5. "One Love"
6. "Their Law" (Live)
7. "Wind It Up" (The Rewound Edit)
8. "Voodoo People" (Live)
9. "Poison"
10. "No Good (Start the Dance)" (Live)
11. "Charly"
12. "Poison" (Live)
13. "Everybody in the Place"
14. "Rhythm of Life" (Live)
15. "No Good (Start the Dance)"
16. "Molotov Bitch (End Credits)"
17. “We Eat Rhythm (End Credits)”

== Certifications ==
Certifications for Electronic Punks
Region	Certification	Certified units/sales
United Kingdom (BPI)	Platinum	50,000^{*}
^{*} Sales figures based on certification alone.

== Distribution ==
Duration: 1 h, 35 min

XL Recordings VHS (Europe): XLV 017
XL Recordings VHS (Australia): 200647 2
Avex Trax VHS (Japan only): AVVD 90017
Feelee VHS (Russia): FF001
Ministry of Sound VHS (USA): 89889
