= Omen (The Prodigy song) =

Single by The Prodigy

from the album Invaders Must Die
- Released: 16 February 2009
- Length: 3:36
- Label: Take Me to the Hospital; Cooking Vinyl
- Songwriters: Liam Howlett; Keith Palmer; Tim Hutton
- Producers: Liam Howlett; James Rushent

The Prodigy singles chronology
| "Invaders Must Die" (2008) | "Omen" (2009) | "Warrior's Dance" (2009) |

Music video
- "Omen" on YouTube

"Omen" is the nineteenth single released by the British electronic band The Prodigy. It was released on 16 February 2009, and it is the first commercial single from the album Invaders Must Die.

The release was announced on 9 January, in a newsletter sent to fans. The single is accompanied by a video that features live footage from the band. It was first played on Radio 1 on 12 January. The single was co-produced by Does It Offend You, Yeah? singer James Rushent and features a remix from the Dutch drum and bass group Noisia. The track was the Prodigy's tenth top 10 hit on the UK Singles Chart. The single has yet to receive a physical release outside Europe. The song won the Kerrang! Award for Best Single. It came in at number 68 in the 2009 Triple J Hottest 100: the fifth track by the Prodigy to chart in the annual countdown, following "Voodoo People" in 1994, "Breathe" and "Firestarter" in 1996, and "Funky Shit" in 1997. The song is featured in the movie Kick-Ass and also on the soundtrack respectively.

== Music video ==
The official music video was uploaded to YouTube on 19 January 2009. The video depicts The Prodigy performing at a rave, interspersed with clips of a mysterious girl playing a glockenspiel.

== Chart performance ==
In its second week on the charts, the single moved up the charts to break into the top five, at number four, making it their highest-charting single since "Breathe" reached number one in 1996.

== Track listing ==
CD single

1. "Omen" (edit) – 3:14
2. "Omen" (Noisia remix) – 6:18
3. "Omen" (instrumental) – 3:36

12" vinyl

1. "Omen" (Noisia remix) – 6:18
2. "Invaders Must Die" (Chase & Status remix) – 5:09

Digital bundle

1. "Omen" (edit) – 3:14
2. "Omen" (Hervé's End of the World remix) – 5:22 (exclusive to iTunes)
3. "Omen" (Noisia remix) – 6:18
4. "Omen" (extended mix) – 3:41
5. "Omen" (instrumental) – 3:36

== Charts ==
=== Weekly charts ===
| Chart (2009) | Peak position |
|---|---|
| Australia (ARIA) | 83 |
| Austria (Ö3 Austria Top 40) | 22 |
| Belgium (Ultratip Bubbling Under Flanders) | 16 |
| Euro Digital Song Sales (Billboard) | 6 |
| France (SNEP) | 61 |
| Germany (GfK) | 28 |
| Ireland (IRMA) | 28 |
| Netherlands (Single Top 100) | 75 |
| Mexico Ingles Airplay (Billboard) | 31 |
| Switzerland (Schweizer Hitparade) | 40 |
| UK Singles (Official Charts) | 4 |
| UK Dance (Official Charts) | 1 |

Note: In Germany, the song is credited as 'O'.

=== Year-end charts ===
| Chart (2009) | Position |
|---|---|
| UK Singles (OCC) | 71 |

== Certifications ==
| Region | Certification | Certified units/sales |
|---|---|---|
| United Kingdom (BPI) | Platinum | 600,000^{‡} |
^{‡} Sales+streaming figures based on certification alone.

== Cover versions ==
It was also released as a single by Japanese metalcore band Crossfaith, and this version was included on the Japanese version of Punk Goes Pop 3.
