= Hackers (film) =

1995 film by Iain Softley

- Theatrical release poster
- Directed by: Iain Softley
- Written by: Rafael Moreu
- Produced by: Michael Peyser; Ralph Winter
- Starring: Jonny Lee Miller; Angelina Jolie; Fisher Stevens; Lorraine Bracco
- Cinematography: Andrzej Sekuła
- Edited by: Christopher Blunden; Martin Walsh
- Music by: Simon Boswell
- Production company: United Artists
- Distributed by: MGM/UA Distribution Co. (United States); United International Pictures (international)
- Release date: September 15, 1995
- Running time: 105 minutes
- Country: United States
- Language: English
- Budget: $20 million
- Box office: $7.6 million

Hackers is a 1995 American crime thriller film directed by Iain Softley and starring Jonny Lee Miller, Angelina Jolie, Fisher Stevens, and Lorraine Bracco, with Jesse Bradford, Matthew Lillard, Laurence Mason, and Renoly Santiago. The film follows a group of high school hackers and their involvement in an attempted theft. Made in the mid-1990s when the Internet was just starting to become popular among the general public, it reflects the ideals laid out in the Hacker Manifesto quoted in the film: "This is our world now... the world of the electron and the switch... We exist without skin color, without nationality, without religious bias... and you call us criminals... Yes, I am a criminal. My crime is that of curiosity."

The film received mixed reviews from critics, and underperformed at the box office upon release, but has gone on to achieve cult classic status.

== Plot ==
In 1988, 11-year-old Dade "Zero Cool" Murphy is banned from owning or operating computers and telephones until his 18th birthday, after his family is fined US$45,000 (Note: equivalent to $123,000 in 2025) for his crashing of 1,507 computer systems, causing a seven-point drop in the New York Stock Exchange.

On his 18th birthday, Dade has moved to New York City with his mother, and his ban is lifted. While he hacks into a local TV station, another hacker by the handle of "Acid Burn" counters Dade's attack and eventually kicks him out. Dade makes a new handle in the process, "Crash Overrride." At school, Dade joins a group of hackers: Ramon "The Phantom Phreak" Sanchez, Emmanuel "Cereal Killer" Goldstein, Paul "Lord Nikon" Cook, Joey Pardella (a novice hacker without an alias and the youngest member), and Kate "Acid Burn" Libby—the hacker who kicked him out of the TV station earlier.

Joey, out to prove his skills, breaks into a "Gibson" supercomputer owned by the Ellingson Mineral Corporation. While he is downloading a garbage file as proof of his feat, his mother disconnects his computer, leaving him with a fragmented file. His intrusion has been noticed and brought to the attention of computer security officer Eugene "The Plague" Belford, a former hacker. Plague realizes that the downloaded garbage file is a worm he himself inserted to defraud Ellingson. Claiming the file is the code to the "Da Vinci" computer virus that will capsize the company's oil tanker fleet, and pretending the hackers are to blame, he enlists the U.S. Secret Service to recover the file. In fact, Plague had inserted the "Da Vinci" virus as a red herring to cover for his worm.

Joey is arrested and his computer is searched, but he had hidden the disk containing the file. Dade and Kate make a bet: Dade chooses a date with Kate if he wins, and Kate has Dade be her slave if she does. The hacking duel targets Secret Service Agent Richard Gill, who was involved in Joey's arrest. After various hacks, including canceling Gill's credit cards, fabricating a criminal record, and changing his payroll status to "deceased", the duel remains a tie.

Released on bail, Joey reveals the disk to Phreak, who is arrested the next day, and informs Kate that the disk is hidden in a bathroom at school. Dade refuses to help Kate and Cereal Killer as he has a record, but copies the disk so they have untampered evidence. Determining that Dade did not hack into Ellingson, Plague sends him a powerful laptop and asks Dade to join him. He later threatens to have Dade's mother incarcerated with a manufactured criminal record, forcing Dade to deliver a copy of the disk.

Kate, Lord Nikon, Cereal Killer, and Dade learn that the code is a worm designed to steal $25 million (Note: Equivalent to $52.8 million in 2025) from Ellingson transactions, and that the Da Vinci virus is set to capsize the oil tanker fleet the next day to provide cover and distract from the worm. Dade confesses that he gave Plague a copy of the disk and reveals his hacking history as "Zero Cool".

Dade and Kate seek out Razor and Blade, producers of Hack the Planet, a hacker-themed TV show. Lord Nikon and Cereal Killer learn that warrants for their arrest are to be executed at 9 a.m. the next day.

The next morning, Dade, Kate, Nikon, and Cereal roller-blade from Washington Square Park, evading the Secret Service by hacking the traffic lights. Meeting up with Joey at Grand Central Terminal, they use payphones and acoustic couplers to hack the Gibson. At first, their attempts are easily rebuffed by Plague, who calls Dade to taunt him. Razor and Blade have contacted hackers around the world, who lend their support and distract Plague long enough for Joey to download the file.

After crashing the Gibson, Dade and company are arrested. Dade cryptically informs Cereal Killer that he has tossed the disk in a trash can. As Dade and Kate are being interrogated, Razor and Blade jam TV signals and broadcast live video of Cereal Killer revealing the plot and Plague's complicity. Plague is arrested by Gill on board a flight while attempting to flee to Japan. Their names cleared, Dade and Kate begin a relationship.

== Cast ==
- Jonny Lee Miller as Dade Murphy a.k.a. Zero Cool/Crash Override
- Angelina Jolie as Kate Libby aka Acid Burn
- Fisher Stevens as Eugene Belford aka The Plague
- Jesse Bradford as Joey Pardella
- Matthew Lillard as Emmanuel Goldstein aka Cereal Killer
- Laurence Mason as Paul Cook aka Lord Nikon
- Renoly Santiago as Ramόn Sánchez aka The Phantom Phreak
- Wendell Pierce as Secret Service Agent Richard "Dick" Gill
- Alberta Watson as Lauren Murphy
- Lorraine Bracco as Margo Wallace
- Penn Jillette as Hal

In addition, Darren Lee and Peter Y. Kim appear as Razor and Blade, respectively, while singer Marc Anthony plays Secret Service Agent Ray.

== Production ==
=== Screenplay ===
The screenplay, written by Rafael Moreu, is highly inspired by the hacker and cyberpunk subcultures. He saw the film as more than just about computer hacking but something much larger: "In fact, to call hackers a counterculture makes it sound like they're a transitory thing; I think they're the next step in human evolution." He had been interested in hacking since the early 1980s. After the crackdown in the United States during 1989 and 1990, he decided to write a script about the subculture. For research, Moreu went to a meeting organized by the New York–based hacker magazine 2600: The Hacker Quarterly. There, he met Phiber Optik, a.k.a. Mark Abene, a 22-year-old hacker who spent most of 1994 in prison on hacking charges. Moreu also hung out with other young hackers being harassed by the government and began to figure out how it would translate into a film. He remembered, "One guy was talking about how he'd done some really interesting stuff with a laptop and payphones and that cracked it for me, because it made it cinematic". Moreu named the film's Ellingson Mineral Corporation for his father-in-law, Chet Ellingson, who had bought Moreu his first computer. The character Eugene Belford uses Babbage as a pseudonym at the end of the film, a reference to Charles Babbage, an inventor of an early form of the computer. The fictional computer mainframe named the "Gibson" is an homage to cyberpunk author William Gibson and originator of the term "cyberspace", first in his 1982 short story "Burning Chrome" and later in his 1984 book Neuromancer.

The novelization of the film, written by David Bischoff and based on Moreu's screenplay, was released on July 11, 1995, two months before the film's release.

=== Pre-production ===
The cast spent three weeks getting to know each other and learning how to type and rollerblade. They studied computers and met with actual computer hackers, including Tristan Louis, Kevin Mitnick, and Nicholas Jarecki. Jarecki served as a technical consultant and credits his experience on Hackers as inspiring his later career as the screenwriter and director. Actor Jonny Lee Miller even attended a hackers' convention.

=== Casting ===
According to Fisher Stevens, Quentin Tarantino was considered for the role of The Plague.

=== Production ===
The school scenes were filmed in Stuyvesant High School and the surrounding areas in the TriBeCa, Battery Park City, and East Village neighborhoods of Manhattan in November 1994. In several exterior scenes, the viewer can see the World Financial Center. Many scenes included real school seniors as extras.

The interior scenes for the Cyberdelia nightclub were filmed at the disused Brentford Public Baths, on the outskirts of London. Producer Ralph Winter noted, "We never knew why, but the pool was designated a historic landmark, so great care had to be taken not to damage anything and to return it to its original state." The exterior set was filmed in Downtown Manhattan.

The scenes for Ellingson Mineral Corporation were filmed on a soundstage, but the establishing shots of the company's headquarters used One Liberty Plaza and took inspiration from that building to create the hardware behind "The Kernel". In the final shot of the building, Softley digitally added a swimming pool on the rooftop of the building. Additionally, establishing shots of the World Trade Center and Empire State Building were used to occasionally give the viewer a visual reminder of the city the film was set in.

=== Post-production ===
Softley did not use CGI for any of the sequences in cyberspace. He said they used "more-conventional methods of motion control, animation, models, and rotoscoping to create a real, three-dimensional world, because... computer graphics alone can sometimes lend a more flat, sterile image." Video game developer Psygnosis created the CGI for the Wipeout arcade game sequence.

Shortly after the filming ended, Jonny Lee Miller and Angelina Jolie were married. They separated after a year and divorced in 1999, and remain good friends.

=== Marketing ===
MGM/UA set up a website for Hackers that soon afterwards was allegedly hacked by a group called the "Internet Liberation Front". A photograph of the film's stars Angelina Jolie and Jonny Lee Miller was doodled upon, and the words "this is going to be an entertaining fun promotional site for a movie", were replaced with "this is going to be a lame, cheesy promotional site for a movie!" The studio maintained the site during the theatrical run of the film in its altered form.

The film poster shows Acid Burn and Crash Override with various words and ASCII symbols superimposed on their faces, with the words:

- Lord Nikon, Acid Burn, and Crash Override
- God, Sex, Love, and Secret
- Phreak

The text references the main characters in the film, the most commonly used passwords, and the type of user who specializes in telecommunication hacking.

== Soundtrack ==
Softley said that he wanted the film's music to be dreamlike and reflect the aspects of data and technology being shown on screen. He compiled tracks from various artists, while taking suggestions from assistant Gala Wright and music supervisor Bob Last.

The music soundtrack combines electronica, pulsating tribal rhythms and techno/house music of early hardcore groups like Prodigy, Underworld and Orbital; it was released in three separate volumes over three years. The first volume was composed entirely of music featured in the film (with the exception of Carl Cox's "Phoebus Apollo"), while the second and third are a mix of music "inspired by the film" as well as music actually in the film. The most featured song in the film is "Voodoo People" by The Prodigy.

Most of the music in the film, including much of the techno and electronic music, was composed and performed by UK film composer Simon Boswell.

=== Original Motion Picture Soundtrack ===
Hackers: Their Only Crime Was Curiosity: Original Motion Picture Soundtrack
No.	Title	Artist(s)	Length
1.	"Original Bedroom Rockers"	Kruder & Dorfmeister	6:07
2.	"Cowgirl"	Underworld	8:56
3.	"Voodoo People"	The Prodigy	4:08
4.	"Open Up"	Leftfield (featuring John Lydon)	6:54
5.	"Phoebus Apollo"	Carl Cox	3:40
6.	"The Joker"	Josh Abrahams	5:01
7.	"HALCYON + ON + ON"	Orbital	9:29
8.	"Communicate" (Headquake Hazy Cloud Mix)	Plastico	6:25
9.	"One Love"	The Prodigy	3:54
10.	"Connected"	Stereo MC's	4:01
11.	"Eyes, Lips, Body" (Mekon Vocal Mix)	Ramshackle	5:21
12.	"Good Grief"	Urban Dance Squad	4:31
13.	"Richest Junkie Still Alive" (Sank Remix)	Machines of Loving Grace	4:12
14.	"Heaven Knows"	Squeeze	4:35

=== Hackers^{2} ===
Hackers^{2}: Music from and Inspired by the Original Motion Picture "Hackers"
No.	Title	Artist(s)	Length
1.	"Firestarter" (Empirion Mix)	The Prodigy	7:49
2.	"Toxygene"	The Orb	5:17
3.	"Little Wonder" (Danny Saber Dance Mix)	David Bowie	5:30
4.	"Fire"	Scooter	3:31
5.	"Narcotic Influence 2"	Empirion	5:55
6.	"Remember"	BT	8:00
7.	"Go"	Moby	3:59
8.	"Inspection (Check One)"	Leftfield	6:29
9.	"Cherry Pie"	Underworld	8:19
10.	"To Be Loved" (Disco Citizens R+D Edit)	Luce Drayton	3:48
11.	"Speed Freak" (Moby Remix)	Orbital	5:41
12.	"Get Ready to Bounce" (Radio Attack)	Brooklyn Bounce	3:34
13.	"Offshore" (Disco Citizens Edit)	Chicane	3:09
14.	"Original"	Leftfield	6:24

=== Hackers^{3} ===
Hackers^{3}: Music from and Inspired by the Original Motion Picture "Hackers"
No.	Title	Artist(s)	Length
1.	"Why Can't It Stop"	Moby	5:52
2.	"Godspeed" (BT Edit Mix)	BT	5:34
3.	"Absurd" (Whitewash Mix)	Fluke	5:59
4.	"Quiet Then"	Cloak	4:21
5.	"I Am Fresh"	Monkey Mafia	4:51
6.	"Phuture 2000" (Radio Edit)	Carl Cox	3:49
7.	"An Fhomhair"	Orbital	6:58
8.	"Fashion" (Ian Pooley Mix)	Phunky Data	7:13
9.	"Psychopath" (Leftfield Mix)	John Lydon	4:21
10.	"Stop & Panic"	Cirrus	7:18
11.	"Strong in Love"	Chicane	7:49
12.	"Hack the Planet"	Brooklyn Bounce	4:17
13.	"Diskette"	Simon Boswell	2:05
14.	"Launch DiVinci"	Simon Boswell	2:59

=== 25th Anniversary Edition ===
In 2020, to celebrate the 25th anniversary of the film, the soundtrack was released for the first time on vinyl, in a two-disc set. A new soundtrack album by Varèse Sarabande was also released.

==== Disk 1 ====
1. "HALCYON + ON + ON" – Orbital
2. "Open Up" – Leftfield (featuring John Lydon)
3. "Cowgirl" – Underworld
4. "Voodoo People" – The Prodigy
5. "Connected" – Stereo MCs
6. "One Love" – The Prodigy
7. "Original Bedroom Rockers" – Kruder & Dorfmeister
8. "Good Grief" – Urban Dance Squad
9. "Heaven Knows" – Squeeze

==== Disk 2 ====
1. "Protection" – performed by Massive Attack
2. "One Combination" – performed by Guy Pratt
3. "Grand Central Station" – performed by Guy Pratt featuring David Gilmour
4. "Hackers Suite" – Simon Boswell
5. "Diskette" – Simon Boswell
6. "City of Data" – Simon Boswell
7. "Ellingson HQ" – Simon Boswell
8. "Cereal's Speech" – Simon Boswell
9. "Kernel" – Simon Boswell
10. "Date Night" – Simon Boswell

=== Additional information ===
Songs featured in the film but not appearing on any soundtracks:

- "Real Wild Child" – written by Johnny O'Keefe, Johnny Greenan and 'Dave Owen (VIII)' (as Dave Owens)

== Reception ==
=== Box office ===
The film was released September 15, 1995. It opened in 1,812 theaters and earned $3.2 million in its opening weekend, finishing in 4th place. The film ended its run with a domestic box office gross of $7.6 million.

=== Critical response ===
On the review aggregator website Rotten Tomatoes, the film holds an approval rating of 34% based on reviews from 47 critics. The website's critics consensus reads, "Hackers has a certain stylish appeal, but its slick visuals and appealing young cast can't compensate for a clichéd and disappointingly uninspired story." Metacritic, which uses a weighted average, assigned the film a score of 46 out of 100, based on 14 critics, indicating "mixed or average" reviews. Audiences surveyed by CinemaScore gave the film a grade B on scale of A to F.

Critics praised the film for its stylish visuals but criticized its unconvincing look at hackers and their subculture. Roger Ebert gave the film three out of four stars and wrote, "The movie is smart and entertaining, then, as long as you don't take the computer stuff very seriously. I didn't. I took it approximately as seriously as the archeology in Indiana Jones". On the show Siskel & Ebert, Ebert gave the film thumbs up while Gene Siskel gave the film thumbs down, saying, "I didn't find the characters that interesting and I really didn't like the villain in this piece. I thought Fisher Stevens was not very threatening... The writing is so arch."

Peter Stack of the San Francisco Chronicle, wrote "Want a believable plot or acting? Forget it. But if you just want knockout images, unabashed eye candy and a riveting look at a complex world that seems both real and fake at the same time, Hackers is one of the most intriguing movies of the year." USA Today gave the film three out of four stars and Mike Clark wrote, "When a movie's premise repels all rational analysis, speed is the make-or-break component. To its credit, Hackers recalls the pumped-up energy of Pump Up the Volume, as well as its casting prowess." In his review for the Toronto Star, Peter Goddard wrote, "Hackers joy-rides down the same back streets Marlon Brando did in The Wild One, or Bruce Springsteen does in Born To Run. It gives all the classic kicks of the classic B-flicks, with more action than brains, cool hair and hot clothes, and all the latest tech revved to the max." Chicago Reader critic Jonathan Rosenbaum noted that, "Without being any sort of miracle, this is an engaging and lively exploitation fantasy-thriller about computer hackers, anarchistic in spirit, that succeeds at just about everything The Net failed to—especially in representing computer operations with some visual flair."

The Los Angeles Times's David Kronke wrote, "imagination of Rafael Moreu, making his feature screenwriting debut, and director Iain Softley...piles on the attitude and stylized visuals, no one will notice just how empty and uninvolving the story really is." In his review for The Washington Post, Hal Hinson wrote, "As its stars, Miller and Jolie seem just as one-dimensional—except that, in their case, the effect is intentional." Entertainment Weekly gave the film a "D" rating and Owen Gleiberman wrote, "the movie buys in to the computer-kid-as-elite-rebel mystique currently being peddled by magazines like Wired."

=== Cult status ===
Although Hackers was a box-office disappointment, grossing US$7.6 million on an estimated US$20 million budget, the film went on to develop a strong cult following.

Within hacker culture, the film is celebrated for its flamboyant depiction of cyberpunk aesthetics, its electronic-heavy soundtrack, and its tongue-in-cheek approach to the subject matter. In a retrospective feature, several information security professionals described it as "possibly the single greatest hacker film known to hackerkind," praising its style, humor, and its enduring quotability.

The film's dialogue, including lines such as "Hack the planet!" and "Mess with the best, die like the rest", has become iconic among fans, often chanted during midnight screenings and fan gatherings. Its visual style of rollerblading characters in cyber-goth attire, neon-lit cityscapes, and stylized computer graphics continues to influence nostalgic depictions of 1990s hacker culture.

== Home media ==
Hackers was released by MGM/UA Home Video on VHS and LaserDisc on February 20 1996, and on DVD on August 25, 1998, as a Region 1 widescreen DVD. The Region 2 DVD was released in 2001; it allowed selection between PAL and 16:9 Widescreen, with Dolby Digital. On October 25, 2005, it was released in UMD format, playable on the Sony PSP.

Shout! Factory released a 20th anniversary Blu-ray on August 18, 2015. Blu-ray.com gave the film a 4/5 for both video and audio. DVDTalk.com noted the Blu-ray only includes a DTS-HD Master Audio stereo audio track, while the packaging lists a 5.1 mix as an option, and the previous DVD release includes a 5.1 mix. Shout! Factory released an Ultra HD Blu-ray collector's edition on August 22, 2023, which includes a DTS-HD Master Audio 5.1 track.

== Discussion of a sequel ==
In a September 2020 interview for Collider to commemorate the 25th anniversary of the film, Softley said that there were active discussions regarding a sequel.

== See also ==
- List of films featuring surveillance
- Cyberpunk
- Antitrust
- Killswitch
- Net neutrality
