= Invaders Must Die =

Studio album by the Prodigy
- Released: 23 February 2009
- Recorded: February 2006 – November 2008 in London, New York
- Genres: Big beat; new rave
- Length: 46:01
- Labels: Take Me to the Hospital; Cooking Vinyl; RED
- Producers: Liam Howlett; James Rushent

The Prodigy chronology
Their Law: The Singles 1990–2005 (2005)	Invaders Must Die (2009)	World's on Fire (2011)

Singles from Invaders Must Die
- 1. "Invaders Must Die" Released: 26 November 2008; 2. "Omen" Released: 16 February 2009; 3. "Warrior's Dance" Released: 11 May 2009; 4. "Take Me to the Hospital" Released: 31 August 2009

Invaders Must Die is the fifth studio album by English electronic dance music group the Prodigy. The album was released on 23 February 2009 on the band's new record label Take Me to the Hospital, and was distributed by Cooking Vinyl. Although Liam Howlett, Maxim and Keith Flint all contributed material for The Fat of the Land, Invaders Must Die is the first Prodigy record where, given the departure of Leeroy Thornhill, all band members took part in the creative process. It is their first and currently only album to not contain any explicit songs.

The album was a commercial success, faring better than Always Outnumbered, Never Outgunned. In contrast to the commercial performance, critical reaction to the album was mixed. It has spawned four singles, including the title track, "Omen", "Warrior's Dance" and "Take Me to the Hospital".

== Recording ==
Recording began in February 2006, shortly after the release of Their Law: The Singles 1990–2005, and ended in November 2008. Some of the songs recorded for the album, such as the synthesizer-led "Colours" were written before the release of the group's fourth album, and early versions were showcased in live performances. Liam Howlett conceived the album musical direction as a mashup of their previous albums. The new album was set to be released in summer 2007, but when the album's release date was postponed to the "first quarter of next year [2008]," the band had conceived over 25 ideas while completing production on certain tracks and writing lyrics.

Howlett revealed in an April 2008 interview that he had three more months of work left for the new album. He also said that he has a working album title and song titles, but was not ready to publicly announce them until these details were released through The Prodigy's official newsletter on 4 November. This announcement stated that the album would be a return to their "old-school but cutting edge" roots, and would feature collaborations with Dave Grohl of Foo Fighters, Them Crooked Vultures, and Nirvana, and James Rushent of Does It Offend You, Yeah?, but would not feature any guest vocals.

== Composition ==
Invaders Must Die's title track is the album's opening track, and its lyrics include the name of the group in the line "We are the Prodigy". The song is featured in many films and game trailers such as the film Kick-Ass and the Duke Nukem Forever game trailer. The song was also featured in the 2023 video game Hi-Fi Rush. "Omen" has a similar tempo, and both tracks were co-produced by James Rushent. "Thunder" recreates elements from Trevor Joe's "Ethiopian Peace Song" (also known as "Rasta Peace Song"), while "Colours" is one of the first songs written by the entire band.

"Take Me to the Hospital"'s music video was the Prodigy's first to be released on the Vidzone application. The promotional film was filmed onto VHS rather than digital recording equipment to obtain an old school 1990s look. The track samples "Salami Fever" by Pepe Deluxé and "Ragamuffin Duo Take Charge" by Asher D & Daddy Freddy, and the name of the song comes from the record label of the same name. "Warrior's Dance" is one of the most progressive tracks on the album; the song chorus is a sample of the True Faith song "Take Me Away", which was then sampled and edited by Major Players in "Come with Me", the song where the vocals for this track come from. The song also samples "Final Cut", a song featuring Bridget(te) Grace. A festival of the same name was curated by the group, and took place in Milton Keynes.

"Run with the Wolves", featuring Dave Grohl on drums, contains a sample of "So Refined" by Senser. This song was featured in the 2011 film Hall Pass. There was a contest to make a music video for the song, and the winning entry was posted on 15 February 2010. After a "reprise" of "Omen", "World's on Fire" follows. This song samples the Breeders' "I Just Wanna Get Along" and "Vamp" composed by Outlander. "Piranha" samples "Troubled Mind" by the Buff Medways and "Sara Zamana" by Kishore Kumar and Chorus, while "Stand Up", the only instrumental track on the album, samples "One Way Glass" from Manfred Mann Chapter Three. This song, along with "Omen", is featured heavily in the 2010 film Kick-Ass, and both are included on the soundtrack album.

== Promotion ==
The title track "Invaders Must Die" was chosen as the lead single from the album, and was released from the band's website as a free digital download on 26 November 2008. The download was announced in a newsletter sent to fans on 24 November, and first aired on Zane Lowe's Radio 1 show as the 'Hottest Record in the World' of the same day it was released. Although it was not released as a commercial single, the song peaked at No. 49 on the UK singles chart.

"Omen" debuted at No. 1 on the Canadian Singles Chart during the week of 25 February 2009, and peaked at No. 4 in the UK. In Australia, the song debuted at No. 83.

The single that followed, "Warrior's Dance", was released on 11 May 2009. The digital version of the single was released on 17 April 2009 in Australia as an iTunes exclusive, while the "Edit" version with none of the remixes is also available. When released there, however, the song was titled incorrectly and the download was actually a song from the band Placebo; this issue was fixed shortly after its release. Three downloadable remixes of "Warrior's Dance" were sold via the group's website, while an extra remix was exclusive to iTunes. The song peaked at No. 9 on the UK singles chart.

"Take Me to the Hospital", released on 31 August 2009, was the final commercially released single from the album. It was remixed six times, with the "Wreckage" mix being a collaboration with Josh Homme. The song debuted at No. 38 on the UK singles chart and topped the UK Dance Chart.

== Release and reception ==
Professional ratings
Aggregate scores
Source	Rating
AnyDecentMusic?	6.1/10
Metacritic	60/100
Review scores
Source	Rating
AllMusic	3.5/5 stars
The Guardian	3/5 stars
Mixmag	4/5 stars
Mojo	3/5 stars
The Observer	3/5 stars
Pitchfork	5.8/10
Q	4/5 stars
Rolling Stone	1.5/5 stars
Spin	4/5 stars
The Times	4/5 stars

Invaders Must Die was released as a CD, CD/DVD set, double-vinyl, digital download and a luxury-like 7-inch vinyl box set that includes five 7-inches, CD/DVD, bonus CD, poster, stickers and stencils. To coincide with the release of the album, the band embarked on a nine date UK arena tour, with support from Dizzee Rascal, Noisia, Herve and DJ Kissy Sell Out. The "Warrior's Dance" video aired on Channel 4 on 28 March at 12:00 am.

As with Always Outnumbered, Never Outgunned, initial critical response to Invaders Must Die was mixed. At Metacritic, which assigns a normalised rating out of 100 to reviews from mainstream critics, the album received an average score of 60, based on 20 reviews. One example was AllMusic, who called it "a curious nu-rave record, as though the sound of 1991 (such as their Top Ten hit "Charly") has been filtered through the sound of 1996 (such as their number one, "Firestarter") to emerge as nothing more than a hodgepodge of uptempo dance music with extroverted beats and grimy basslines.

However, it was a commercial success. The album debuted at the top of the UK Albums Chart on 1 March 2009 with 97,254 copies sold, giving them their fourth consecutive number one album in the UK. The album performed well worldwide as well, entering the top five in Poland, Ireland, the Netherlands, Australia, Canada, Belgium and Germany. The album debuted at No. 117 in the US but jumped to No. 58 in its second week. The album received Gold sales status in Australia and Germany, while Switzerland classified it as "2× Gold" with 30,000 copies. As of 7 November 2009 the album has sold over 1,029,000 copies worldwide.

The European edition includes an 11-track audio CD and a DVD with the videos for "Invaders Must Die," "Omen" and live performances of "World's on Fire" and "Warrior's Dance". The DVD has a computer-readable (HD data for Microsoft Windows and Mac OS X) high definition version of the former music video. On 21 October 2009, the album was re-released as "Invaders Must Die Special Edition", which included remixes of the album itself, a different album cover, and a DVD containing music videos and live performances. One of the tracks on the edition was eventually released as a MP3 for download. The song was later released as "Invaders".

On Saturday 23 February 2019, in celebration of the 10-year anniversary of Invaders Must Die's original release in 2009, the album was repressed on clear vinyl and limited to 1,000 copies to be sold on the Prodigy's official merchandise web store for release on 17 May 2019.

== Track listing ==
No.	Title	Writer(s)	Length
1.	"Invaders Must Die"	Liam Howlett, Nick Halkes	4:55
2.	"Omen"	Howlett, Tim Hutton, Maxim	3:36
3.	"Thunder"	Howlett, Hutton, Trevor Joe	4:08
4.	"Colours"	Howlett, Keith Flint, John Fortis	3:27
5.	"Take Me to the Hospital"	Howlett, Flint, Jari Salo, Paul Malmström	3:39
6.	"Warrior's Dance"	Howlett, Bridget[te] Grace, Jeff Mills, Anthony Srock	5:12
7.	"Run With the Wolves"	Howlett, Flint	4:24
8.	"Omen (Reprise)"	Howlett, Hutton	2:14
9.	"World's on Fire"	Howlett, Maxim, Marcos Vicente Salon, Kim Deal	4:50
10.	"Piranha"	Howlett, Maxim, Scrapper, Billy Childish, Rajesh Roshan, Sameer Anjaan	4:05
11.	"Stand Up"	Howlett, Manfred Mann, Peter Thomas	5:30
Total length:			46:01

Special Edition Disc 1 bonus tracks
No.	Title	Length
12.	"The Big Gundown"	4:20
13.	"Wild West"	4:15
14.	"Omen" (Live at Rock am Ring 2009)	4:13

Special Edition Disc 2
No.	Title	Length
1.	"Invaders Must Die" (Liam H Re-Amped Version)	2:59
2.	"Invaders Must Die" (Chase & Status Remix)	5:10
3.	"Omen" (Noisia Remix)	6:20
4.	"Omen" (Hervé's End of the World Remix)	5:24
5.	"Warrior's Dance" (Future Funk Squad's 'Rave Soldier' Mix)	5:33
6.	"Warrior's Dance" (Benga Remix)	4:45
7.	"Warrior's Dance" (South Central Remix)	5:42
8.	"Take Me to the Hospital" (Rusko Remix)	4:24
9.	"Take Me to the Hospital" (Sub Focus Remix)	4:33
10.	"Take Me to the Hospital" (Josh Homme & Liam H's Wreckage Mix)	4:10
11.	"Take Me to the Hospital" (Loser's Middlesex A&E Remix)	5:47
12.	"Invaders Must Die" (Yuksek Remix)	5:03
13.	"Thunder" (Bang Gang Remix)	5:48

Special Edition DVD
No.	Title	Length
1.	"Invaders Must Die" (video)
2.	"Omen" (video)
3.	"Warrior's Dance" (video)
4.	"Take Me to the Hospital" (video)
5.	"World's on Fire" (live video)
6.	"Warrior's Dance" (live video)
7.	"Run" (live video)
8.	"Take Me to the Hospital" (Big Day Out Australia 2009)

iTunes bonus tracks
No.	Title	Length
1.	"Invaders Must Die" (Chase & Status remix)	5:09
2.	"Omen" (edit)	3:14
3.	"Track by Track Talk Through"	16:44

Lost Beats EP (bonus disc)
No.	Title	Length
1.	"The Big Gundown"	4:21
2.	"Black Smoke"	3:26
3.	"Wild West"	4:15
4.	"Fighter Beat"	3:32

Bonus DVD
No.	Title	Length
1.	"Invaders Must Die" (video)
2.	"Omen" (video)
3.	"World's on Fire" (live video)
4.	"Warrior's Dance" (live video)

Japanese Edition bonus tracks
No.	Title	Length
12.	"Black Smoke"	3:26
13.	"Fighter Beat"	3:32

Warrior's Dance Fest edition (Japanese only) Disc 2
No.	Title	Length
1.	"Invaders Must Die" (Chase & Status remix)	5:10
2.	"Omen" (edit)	3:14
3.	"Omen" (Noisia remix)	6:20
4.	"Omen" (Hervé's End of the World remix)	5:24
5.	"Warrior's Dance" (Kicks Like a Mule remix)	5:09
6.	"Warrior's Dance" (Future Funk Squad's "Rave Soldier" mix)	5:33
7.	"Warrior's Dance" (Benga remix)	4:45
8.	"Warrior's Dance" (South Central remix)	5:42
9.	"Take Me to the Hospital" (Rusko remix)	4:24
10.	"Take Me to the Hospital" (Sub Focus remix)	4:33
11.	"Take Me to the Hospital" (Adam F & Horx remix)	5:33
12.	"Take Me to the Hospital" (Josh Homme & Liam H's Wreckage mix)	4:10
13.	"Take Me to the Hospital" (Loser's Middlesex A&E remix)	5:47
14.	"Wild West"	4:15

=== Notes ===
- ^A Lost Beats EP is available with the deluxe box set edition and was also released on iTunes some time after.
- ^B "The Big Gundown" is a renamed, studio version of "Comanche," a track played live by the band.

== Singles ==
Date of release	Title	UK chart position
26 November 2008	"Invaders Must Die"	49
16 February 2009	"Omen"	4
11 May 2009	"Warrior's Dance"	9
31 August 2009	"Take Me to the Hospital"	38

== Personnel ==
The Prodigy

- Liam Howlett – synthesizers, sampling, programming, production, engineering, mixing
- Keith Flint – vocals ("Omen", "Colours", "Take Me to the Hospital", "Run with the Wolves", "World's on Fire")
- Maxim – vocals ("Omen", "Colours", "Take Me to the Hospital", "Omen Reprise", "World's on Fire", "Piranha")

Additional musicians and co-production

- Brother Culture – vocals on "Thunder"
- Amanda Ghost – backing vocals on "Colours"
- Tim Hutton – additional guitars on "Colours", horns on "Piranha"
- Dave Grohl – live drums on "Run with the Wolves" and "Stand Up"
- James Rushent – co-producer on "Invaders Must Die" and "Omen"
- Damian Taylor – additional pre-production on all tracks

Engineers

- Neil McLellan – mixing (all tracks, except "Omen Reprise" and "Stand Up")
- Damian Taylor – mixing ("Omen Reprise" and "Stand Up")
- John Davis – mastering (at Metropolis Mastering)

== Charts and certifications ==
=== Weekly charts ===
Chart (2009)	Peak position
Australian Albums (ARIA)	3
Austrian Albums (Ö3 Austria)	5
Belgian Albums (Ultratop Flanders)	4
Belgian Albums (Ultratop Wallonia)	12
Canadian Albums (Billboard)	25
Danish Albums (Hitlisten)	17
Dutch Albums (Album Top 100)	3
Finnish Albums (Suomen virallinen lista)	9
French Albums (SNEP)	22
German Albums (Offizielle Top 100)	3
Hungarian Albums (MAHASZ)	2
Italian Albums (FIMI)	32
New Zealand Albums (RMNZ)	4
Norwegian Albums (VG-lista)	10
Portuguese Albums (AFP)	19
Spanish Albums (Promusicae)	44
Swedish Albums (Sverigetopplistan)	23
Swiss Albums (Schweizer Hitparade)	1
UK Albums (Official Charts)	1
UK Dance Albums (Official Charts)	1
US Billboard 200	58
US Top Dance Albums (Billboard)	3

=== Year-end charts ===
Chart (2009)	Position
Australian Albums (ARIA)	65
Belgian Albums (Ultratop Flanders)	76
Dutch Albums (Album Top 100)	40
French Albums (SNEP)	190
German Albums (Offizielle Top 100)	60
Swiss Albums (Schweizer Hitparade)	37
UK Albums (OCC)	16
US Top Dance/Electronic Albums (Billboard)	18

Chart (2010)	Position
UK Albums (OCC)	159

== Certifications ==
Region	Certification	Certified units/sales
Australia (ARIA)	Gold	35,000^{^}
Austria (IFPI Austria)	Gold	10,000^{*}
Germany (BVMI)	Gold	100,000^{^}
Netherlands (NVPI)	Gold	30,000^{^}
New Zealand (RMNZ)	Gold	7,500^{‡}
Poland (ZPAV)	Gold	10,000^{*}
Russia (NFPF)	Gold	10,000^{*}
Switzerland (IFPI Switzerland)	Gold	15,000^{^}
United Kingdom (BPI)	2× Platinum	600,000^{^}
^{*} Sales figures based on certification alone.^{^} Shipments figures based on certification alone.^{‡} Sales+streaming figures based on certification alone.

== Commercial performance ==
In 2010, the album was awarded a double platinum certification from the Independent Music Companies Association, indicating sales of at least 1,000,000 copies throughout Europe.
