= Leeroy Thornhill =

British musician

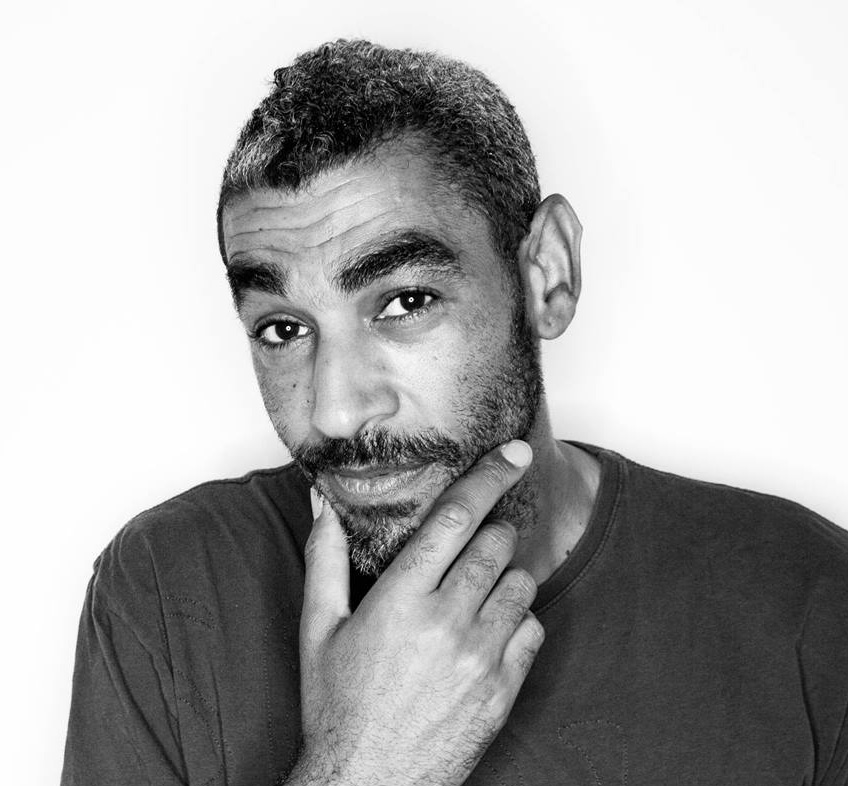
- Leeroy Thornhill in August 2015

Background information
- Born: 8 October 1968 (age 58); Barking, London, England
- Genres: Electronic; big beat
- Occupations: Musician; DJ; street dancer; keyboardist
- Instruments: Synthesisers
- Years active: 1990–present
- Member of: Smash Hi-Fi
- Formerly of: The Prodigy
- Website: leeroythornhill.com

Leeroy Thornhill (born 8 October 1968) is a British electronic music artist and formerly a rave dancer and occasional keyboardist for the British electronic group the Prodigy. Thornhill's live performances throughout the 1990s included his unique style of shuffling.

He has also recorded under the names Longman and Flightcrank.

== Life and work ==
Thornhill was born in Barking but raised in Rayne near Braintree in Essex, and grew up as a football and James Brown fan.

He joined the Prodigy along with Keith Flint and Maxim Reality after they met Liam Howlett at a local rave club The Barn. Thornhill also contributed occasional live keyboards; however, he did not make any musical contributions to the band's albums.

In 2000, Thornhill left the band and went on to record various solo EPs under the names "Longman" and "Flightcrank". He subsequently started a DJ career, but he continued to keep in touch with the Prodigy. During the Prodigy's "Their Law" tour Thornhill was the DJ support act at several venues. He also remixed tracks for other artists, such as the Italian Subsonica's "Nuvole Rapide".

Thornhill had worked with Hyper, appearing on their live shows. He appeared at the V Festival in 2007 in Chelmsford, Essex.

His latest project is the creation of nu skool breaks record label Electric Tastebuds. He signed breakbeat group The Wrongstar Society to the label.

In October 2008, a music video was created for "Everything U Need", a track by Thornhill's Smash Hi-Fi project. The video was directed by Philip Carrer and Bleeding Apple.

== Personal life ==
During his time in the Prodigy, Thornhill's height was in direct contrast to the group's other dancer Flint. Thornhill was reported as 6 feet 7 inches (201 cm) tall, compared to Flint who was 5 feet 7 inches (170 cm) tall. In the late 1990s, Thornhill dated broadcaster Sara Cox. Thornhill married Elena Sadchikova in 2014. His wife is an artist who has also contributed to his projects as well.

Thornhill set a release date of 24 October 2024 for his memoir Wildfire: My Ten Years Getting High in the Prodigy. The announcement stated that the book plans to chronicle the decade he spent in the Prodigy, along with a personal collection of photographs.

== Videography ==
Thornhill appeared in numerous music videos during his time as a member of the Prodigy.

Music videos

- "Charly" (1991)
- "Everybody in the Place" (1991)
- "Fire" (1992)
- "Out of Space" (1992)
- "Wind It Up" (1993)
- "One Love" (1993) (CGI likeness and photographs, no physical appearance)
- "No Good (Start the Dance)" (1994)
- "Voodoo People" (1994)
- "Poison" (1995)
- "Firestarter" (1996)
- "Breathe" (1996)

Video albums

- Electronic Punks (1995)

== Discography ==
=== Singles & EPs ===
- Lowrise EP 12" (1993)
- The Longman EP 12" (1996)
- Flightcrank EP CD Ltd & 2×7" Ltd (2000)
- Inside Out (Original Version) / Outside In 10", Ltd (2000)
- Amazing CD & 12" (2001)
- What U Need CD & 12" (2001)
- Wait for Me / Breaking Out Digital Download (2018)
- The Calling / Vibrations Digital Download (2018)
