= Take Me to the Hospital =

Single by the Prodigy

from the album Invaders Must Die
- Released: 31 August 2009
- Recorded: 2008
- Genre: Breakbeat
- Length: 3:40
- Label: Take Me to the Hospital; Cooking Vinyl
- Songwriter(s): Liam Howlett
- Producer(s): Liam Howlett

The Prodigy singles chronology
"Warrior's Dance" (2009)	"Take Me to the Hospital" (2009)	"Nasty" (2015)

Music video
- "Take Me to the Hospital" on YouTube

"Take Me to the Hospital" is the twenty-first single released by the British electronic band the Prodigy. released on 31 August 2009, the CD single includes the Sub Focus remix and the 12" single also includes a Rusko remix. Liam also collaborated with Josh Homme to create the "Wreckage" mix of the song. It is the third commercial single from their fifth studio album Invaders Must Die, after "Omen" and "Warrior's Dance", as well and the free promotional single "Invaders Must Die". It was the band's last UK top 40 hit, reaching number 38.

The song shares its name with the band's record label.

The track features samples from "Salami Fever" by Pepe Deluxé and "Ragamuffin Duo Take Charge" by Asher D and Daddy Freddy.

== Music video ==
The music video became available to view exclusively on the VidZone application for PlayStation 3 on 4 August 2009; it was posted on the official website and YouTube channel on 5 August. It was filmed onto VHS rather than digital recording equipment to obtain an old school 90s look. It starts with shots of the Prodigy in a derelict building (according to the Prodigy it is an abandoned mental hospital), followed by dancing and walking towards an ambulance. After climbing inside the ambulance they continue singing while trashing it from the inside. After exiting they watch a group of people, who are dressed in black and wearing bear masks, spray paint and further vandalise the vehicle. The video ends with additional clips of the band dancing and singing the lyrics, closing with the camera moving away from the now unrecognisable ambulance.

== Track listing ==
=== CD single ===
1. "Take Me to the Hospital" (09 EQ) – 3:42
2. "Take Me to the Hospital" (Sub Focus remix) – 4:33

=== 12" vinyl ===
1. "Take Me to the Hospital" (Sub Focus remix) – 4:33
2. "Take Me to the Hospital" (Rusko remix) – 4:23

=== CD single promo ===
1. "Take Me to the Hospital" (09 EQ) – 3:40
2. "Take Me to the Hospital" (Sub Focus remix) – 4:33
3. "Take Me to the Hospital" (Rusko remix) – 4:23
4. "Take Me to the Hospital" (Adam F and Horx remix) – 5:33
5. "Take Me to the Hospital" (Losers Middlesex A and E remix) – 5:48
6. "Take Me to the Hospital" (Josh Homme and Liam H's "Wreckage" mix) – 4:09

=== Digital download ===
1. "Take Me to the Hospital" (09 EQ edit) – 3:15
2. "Take Me to the Hospital" (09 EQ) – 3:42
3. "Take Me to the Hospital" (instrumental 09 EQ) – 3:40
4. "Take Me to the Hospital" (Sub Focus remix) – 4:33
5. "Take Me to the Hospital" (Rusko remix) – 4:23
6. "Take Me to the Hospital" (Adam F and Horx remix) – 5:33
7. "Take Me to the Hospital" (Losers Middlesex A and E remix) – 5:48
8. "Take Me to the Hospital" (Josh Homme and Liam H's "Wreckage" mix) – 4:09
9. "Take Me to the Hospital" (album version) – 3:42

== Charts ==
Chart (2009)	Peak position
UK Dance (OCC)	1
UK Singles (OCC)	38
