= Music for the Jilted Generation =

Studio album by the Prodigy
- Released: 4 July 1994
- Recorded: 1993–1994
- Studios: Strongroom (London); Earthbound (Braintree, Essex)
- Genres: Breakbeat hardcore; hardcore techno; rave
- Length: 78:07
- Label: XL
- Producers: Liam Howlett; Neil McLellan

The Prodigy chronology
Experience (1992)	Music for the Jilted Generation (1994)	The Fat of the Land (1997)

Singles from Music for the Jilted Generation
- 1. "One Love" Released: 4 October 1993; 2. "No Good (Start the Dance)" Released: 16 May 1994; 3. "Voodoo People" Released: 12 September 1994; 4. "Poison" Released: 6 March 1995

Music for the Jilted Generation is the second studio album by the English electronic music group the Prodigy. It was released on 4 July 1994 through XL Recordings.

The album combines a variety of genres, including electronic and breakbeat, with heavy basslines and energetic, aggressive beats. Tracks such as "No Good (Start the Dance)" and "Voodoo People" exemplify a sound which helped define the 90s electronic music scene. As with the group's debut album, Maxim Reality and Liam Howlett were the only official members of the group to contribute to the album. The other two members, Keith Flint and Leeroy Thornhill, were not credited on any tracks (although all four individuals were pictured in the liner notes).

Music for the Jilted Generation was widely acclaimed for its innovative approach to electronic music, pushing the boundaries of dance and rave genres at the time. Music for the Jilted Generation was a commercial success, solidifying The Prodigy's place as one of the more influential acts in the genre. A remastered edition, More Music for the Jilted Generation, was released in 2008, featuring additional tracks and remixes.

== Music and content ==
Music for the Jilted Generation incorporates elements of rave, breakbeat techno, techno, and hardcore techno. It was released on 4 July 1994 through XL Recordings.

The album is largely a response to the corruption of the rave scene in Britain by its mainstream success, as well as the United Kingdom's Criminal Justice and Public Order Act 1994, which criminalised raves and aspects of rave culture. This is exemplified in the song "Their Law", with the spoken-word intro and the predominant lyric: the "Fuck 'em and their law" sample. Many years later, after the controversy had subsided, Liam Howlett criticised the album's title, referring to it as "stupid", and insisted that the album was never intended to be political.

Many of the samples featured on the album are sound clips from, or inspired by, films. "Full Throttle" contains a reversed sample from the original Star Wars film, and "The Heat (The Energy)" features a sample from Poltergeist III.

When Liam Howlett arrived at the cutting room for the final stage of the album's production, he realised that all the tracks he had planned would not fit onto a CD. As a result, "One Love" was replaced by the single edit, "The Heat (The Energy)" was slightly shortened, and "We Eat Rhythm" was omitted. "We Eat Rhythm" was later released on a free cassette with Select magazine in October 1994, titled Select Future Tracks. Howlett later stated that he felt the edited versions of "One Love" and "Full Throttle" could have been omitted from the track listing altogether.

It was licensed to Mute Records for a US release in February 1995.

=== Artwork ===
Inner sleeve artwork by Les Edwards

The album artwork for Music for the Jilted Generation was designed by Stewart Haygarth (cover) and Les Edwards (inner). The inner artwork, which alludes to the conflicts between ravers and the police during the era of the 1994 Criminal Justice Act, is particularly well-regarded.

== Critical reception and legacy ==
Professional ratings
Review scores
Source	Rating
AllMusic	5/5 stars
The Boston Phoenix	3.5/4 stars
Christgau's Consumer Guide	A
The Guardian	4/5 stars
NME	9/10
Q	4/5 stars
Record Collector	5/5 stars
Rolling Stone	3.5/5 stars
Select	5/5
Smash Hits	4/5

Music for the Jilted Generation received critical acclaim. In his review for NME, Dele Fadele called the album "a stormy requiem for those under siege by the heavy-handed, almost fascistic Criminal Justice Bill", adding that the Prodigy "show that you don't need elaborate texts to send a message across, just hints by way of titles, sampled voices and dialogue, and a wide-ranging musical mood that fires the imagination." Andrew Harrison of Select deemed it "possibly the best electronic pop record you'll hear this year, the instant headrush of hardcore techno studded over with irresistible hooks and harnessed to a series of merciless grooves." In the United States, Robert Christgau praised it as "one of the rare records that's damn near everything you want cheap music to be", while Rolling Stone reviewer Paul Evans noted that although its political subtext may be overlooked by American listeners, the "truly trippy" album "generates universal dance fever." Comparing it with the Prodigy's 1992 debut Experience, Alternative Press found that Music for the Jilted Generation "throws much darker shapes" and "slams harder and rawer and covers more ground". At the end of 1994, Music for the Jilted Generation was named the year's ninth-best album by NME, and it was nominated for the Mercury Music Prize.

In a retrospective review for AllMusic, John Bush lauded Music for the Jilted Generation as "an effective statement of intent" in response to the Criminal Justice Act and noted the Prodigy's move towards a "grubbier" and less sample-reliant sound, "away from the American-influenced rave and acid house of the past and toward a uniquely British vision of breakbeat techno that was increasingly allied to the limey invention of drum'n'bass." The Guardian's Alexis Petridis said that the record "broke free of Experience's rave conventions into a style that was entirely the Prodigy's own." "Under the booming breakbeats, thrash guitars and inflammatory soundbites," commented Record Collector, "Howlett's supernova talent was on overdrive". In 2003, David Bowie named it among his favourite music from the 1990s, remarking that it "was just an amazing record. It impressed me quite a lot."

Music for the Jilted Generation was listed by Spin as the 60th-best album of the 1990s. The album was ranked number 83 on Mojo's list of 100 "modern classics" released from 1993 to 2006. It is also included in the book 1001 Albums You Must Hear Before You Die. In 2008, radio presenter Zane Lowe profiled the album on an episode of his BBC Radio 1 Masterpieces series.

== Track listing ==
All tracks are written by Liam Howlett, unless indicated otherwise. Tracks 5–9 from the second CD are previously released.

No.	Title	Writer(s)	Length
1.	"Intro"		0:45
2.	"Break & Enter"		8:24
3.	"Their Law" (featuring Pop Will Eat Itself)	Howlett, Pop Will Eat Itself	6:40
4.	"Full Throttle"		5:02
5.	"Voodoo People"		6:27
6.	"Speedway (Theme from Fastlane)"		8:56
7.	"The Heat (The Energy)"		4:27
8.	"Poison"	Howlett, Maxim Reality	6:42
9.	"No Good (Start the Dance)"	Howlett, Kelly Charles, James Bratton	6:17
10.	"One Love" (edit)		3:53
11.	"The Narcotic Suite: 3 Kilos"		7:19
12.	"The Narcotic Suite: Skylined"		5:56
13.	"The Narcotic Suite: Claustrophobic Sting"		7:13
Total length:			78:07

More Music for the Jilted Generation disc 2
No.	Title	Length
1.	"Voodoo People" (Radio 1 Maida Vale Session)	4:18
2.	"Poison" (Radio 1 Maida Vale Session)	4:42
3.	"Break & Enter" (2005 Live Edit)	4:56
4.	"Their Law" (live at Pukkelpop)	5:27
5.	"No Good (Start the Dance)" (Bad for You Mix)	6:49
6.	"Scienide"	5:49
7.	"Goa (The Heat the Energy Part 2)"	6:03
8.	"Rat Poison"	5:31
9.	"Voodoo People" (Dust Brothers Remix)	5:55

=== Samples ===
In addition to the film samples mentioned above, Liam Howlett incorporated a significant amount of musical material from other artists:

- "Break and Enter" contains a sample from Baby D's "Casanova," which was also remixed by Liam.
- "Their Law" includes a sample from "Drop That Bassline" by Techno Grooves.
- "Voodoo People" contains a sample from "You're Starting Too Fast" by Johnny Pate. The guitar riff is based on "Very Ape" by Nirvana and is played by Lance Riddler.
- "The Heat (The Energy)" samples "Why'd U Fall" by Lil Louis, "Thousand" by Moby, and 2-Mad's "Don't Hold Back The Feeling."
- "Poison" contains samples from "It's a New Day" by Skull Snaps, "Amen, Brother" by The Winstons, and Bernard "Pretty" Purdie's "Heavy Soul Slinger."
- "No Good (Start the Dance)" samples "No Good for Me" by Kelly Charles and "Funky Nassau" by Bahamian funk group The Beginning of the End.
- "One Love" features the "Arabic Muezzin" sample from the ethnic vocals section of a Zero G sample CD by Time + Space Records. The same sample was also used in "Everybody Say Love" by The Magi & Emanation, which was remixed by Liam Howlett.
- "3 Kilos," Part One of The Narcotic Suite, is based on a riff sampled from Bernard "Pretty" Purdie's "Good Livin' (Good Lovin')."

== Charts ==
=== Weekly charts ===
Chart (1994–2026)	Peak position
Australian Albums (ARIA)	9
Austrian Albums (Ö3 Austria)	7
Belgian Albums (Ultratop Flanders)	22
Croatian International Albums (HDU)	5
Dutch Albums (Album Top 100)	5
Finland (Suomen virallinen lista)	1
German Albums (Offizielle Top 100)	11
Hungarian Albums (MAHASZ)	9
New Zealand Albums (RMNZ)	3
Norwegian Albums (VG-lista)	12
Scottish Albums (Official Charts)	3
Swedish Albums (Sverigetopplistan)	4
Swiss Albums (Schweizer Hitparade)	9
UK Albums (Official Charts)	1
UK Independent Albums (Official Charts)	8
UK Dance Albums (Official Charts)	4
US Billboard 200	198
US Top Catalog Albums (Billboard)	31

=== Year-end charts ===
Chart (1994)	Position
Dutch Albums (Album Top 100)	52
German Albums (Offizielle Top 100)	71
Icelandic Albums (Tónlist)	10
Chart (1995)	Position
Belgian Albums (Ultratop Flanders)	72
UK Albums (OCC)	89
Chart (1997)	Position
Australian Albums (ARIA)	64
New Zealand Albums (RMNZ)	17

== Certifications ==
Region	Certification	Certified units/sales
Australia (ARIA)	Platinum	70,000^{^}
Canada (Music Canada)	Gold	50,000^{^}
Finland (Musiikkituottajat)	Gold	20,830
Poland (ZPAV)	Gold	50,000^{*}
Sweden (GLF)	Gold	50,000^{^}
United Kingdom (BPI)	2× Platinum	600,000^{^}
^{*} Sales figures based on certification alone.^{^} Shipments figures based on certification alone.

== Personnel ==
The Prodigy

- Liam Howlett – performing, synthesizers, keyboards, sampling, drum machines, production (on tracks 1, 2, 3, 6, 8, 11, 12, and 13) at Earthbound Studios; co-production (on tracks 4, 5, 7, 9, and 10) at The Strongroom; mixing; engineering
- Maxim Reality – co-writer and vocalist on "Poison"
- Leeroy Thornhill – dancing (no musical contributions; appears in booklet photos and music videos only)
- Keith Flint – dancing, live vocals (no musical contributions; appears in booklet photos and music videos only)

Other personnel

- Neil McLellan – co-production and mixing (on tracks 4, 5, 7, 9, and 10) at The Strongroom
- Pop Will Eat Itself (Graham Crabb, Clint Mansell, Richard March, Adam Mole, Fuzz Townshend, Kerry Hammond) – performer on "Their Law"
- Phil Bent – live flute
- Lance Riddler – live guitar on "Voodoo People"
- Mike Champion – management
- Les Edwards – inside sleeve painting
- Stuart Haygarth – front cover
- Jamie Fry – rear sleeve
