= Walter Stern (director) =

English filmmaker

- Born: Walter Adrian Stern; 16 November 1965 (age 60); Marylebone, London, England
- Origin: Chelsea, London
- Occupation: Film maker
- Years active: 1991–present

Walter Adrian Stern (born 16 November 1965 in Marylebone, London) is an English music video film director.

== Biography ==
Walter Stern was born in 1965 to an Austrian-Jewish father and an English mother.

== Music videos ==
Stern began his career directing music videos at Control, a small production company based in London.

In 1993, he moved to production company Stigma Films where he first directed a promo for the band The Prodigy. Their collaboration continued throughout the mid to late 1990s, including two critically acclaimed and award-winning promos in 1996: "Firestarter", which won Best Video in the NME People's Choice Award 1996, and "Breathe", which won Best Video at the MTV Europe Music Awards 1997.

Stern joined Academy Films in 1997, introducing himself with the video for The Verve's "Bitter Sweet Symphony". That same year, he began another successful collaboration, this time with the band Massive Attack. This relationship produced promos for "Risingson" (1997), "Teardrop" and "Angel" (both 1998). "Teardrop" won the award for Best Video at the MTV Europe Music Awards 1998 and was nominated for Brit and D&AD awards. He has also worked with artists as diverse as Madonna, David Bowie, Nine Inch Nails and Stereo MCs.

In 2006, he directed a music video for Bloc Party's "The Prayer" and in 2009, he returned to the collaboration with The Prodigy directing a new promo "Take Me to the Hospital".

== Awards ==
At the 2003 Creative & Design Awards, Stern picked up the award for Best Video of the Year and Best Dance Video for Audio Bullys' "We Don't Care".

In 2007, he won the CADS Outstanding Achievement award.

== Advertisements ==
Stern entered the advertising arena in 1997 with an ad for Volkswagen Golf. His commercial career has been as successful as his music video career, collecting a Golden Lion for Volkswagen "Heaven" at Cannes 2000. He has completed two advertisements for Coca-Cola, and other clients include Caffreys, BBC, Orange, Adidas and Diet Coke.

Stern's "Lucky", for the Department for Transport, won him an arrow at BTAA Craft for Best Video Post Production.

His other advertising work includes "Bubbles" for Vodafone, a Transport for London spot for M&C Saatchi and a Johnnie Walker film for BBH.

== Videography ==
- "Stay Beautiful" (1991) video for Manic Street Preachers
- "Hymn" (1994) video for Moby
- "No Good (Start the Dance)" (1994) video for The Prodigy
- "Voodoo People" (1994) video for The Prodigy
- "Poison" (1995) video for The Prodigy
- "Evidence" (1995) video for Faith No More
- "I Luv U Baby" (1995) video for The Original
- "Life Is Sweet" (1995) video for The Chemical Brothers
- "Firestarter" (1996) video for The Prodigy
- "Take It Easy Chicken" (1996) video for Mansun
- "Breathe" (1996) video for The Prodigy
- "Elegantly Wasted" (1997) video for INXS
- "Bitter Sweet Symphony" (1997) video for The Verve
- "Risingson" (1997) video for Massive Attack
- "Look Who's Perfect Now" (1997) video for Transister
- "Teardrop" (1998) video for Massive Attack
- "Angel" (1998) video for Massive Attack
- "Drowned World/Substitute for Love" (1998) video for Madonna
- "Thursday's Child" (1999) video for David Bowie
- "Survive" (2000) video for David Bowie
- "Into the Void" (2000) video for Nine Inch Nails (co-directed with Jeff Richter)
- "We Don't Care" (2003) video for Audio Bullys
- "She Kissed Me (I Felt Like a Hit)" (2003) video for Spiritualized
- "The Prayer" (2006) video for Bloc Party
- "Take Me to the Hospital" (2009) video for The Prodigy (Rejected by the band, second official video directed by Paul Dugdale)
