= No Good (Start the Dance) =

1994 single by The Prodigy

Single by the Prodigy

from the album Music for the Jilted Generation
- Released: 16 May 1994
- Studio: Essex, England
- Length: 6:17 (album version); 4:01 (edit)
- Label: XL
- Songwriter: Liam Howlett
- Producer: Liam Howlett

The Prodigy singles chronology
"One Love" (1993)	"No Good (Start the Dance)" (1994)	"Voodoo People" (1994)

Music video
- "No Good (Start the Dance)" on YouTube

"No Good (Start the Dance)" is a song by English electronic music group the Prodigy. Written and produced by group member Liam Howlett, it was released on 16 May 1994 by XL Recordings as the second single from the group's second studio album, Music for the Jilted Generation (1994). Commercially, the track was presented with the slogan, "Hard dance with attitude" and is built around a repeated vocal sample from "You're No Good for Me", a song released by American singer Kelly Charles in 1987. Howlett initially had doubts whether to use the sample because he thought it was too pop for his taste. The song also contains samples from "Funky Nassau" by Bahamian funk group the Beginning of the End.

The song peaked at number four on the UK Singles Chart and was certified gold in Germany and the United Kingdom. The accompanying music video was directed by Walter Stern and filmed in London. In 2012, NME ranked "No Good (Start the Dance)" at number 33 in their list of "100 Best Songs of the 1990s".

== Critical reception ==
John Bush from AllMusic complimented "No Good (Start the Dance)" as "excellent". British Lennox Herald described it as "rough and ready". In his weekly UK chart commentary, James Masterton noted that it "uses a previously successful formula of combining their mix of hardcore rave beats with an annoyingly commercial sampled hook." He added, "The sample in question will annoy me for months". Maria Jimenez from Music & Media declared it an "beatbreaker". Andy Beevers from Music Week gave it four out of five, calling it "another rough and rugged hardcore track. They still have plenty of grassroot support and will continue to outsell other hardcore acts by a big margin." Tommy Udo from NME said, "This is '90s bubblegum pop that will be remembered fondly for decades to come. [...] This is basically The Chipmunks pitched up to the max, having the same effect as sitting on a washing machine during the spin cycle. Popperstatic." The magazine's Dele Fadele felt the song "show how much a finger on the collective pulse this rave/pop star maintains."

In 2012, NME named it one of The Prodigy’s "finest singles", with its "scuzzy euphoria and thumping bass." Brad Beatnik from the Record Mirror Dance Update wrote, "The first Prodigy release for more than a year sees them working up a typically frenetic hard groove with a neat wobbly bassline and standard 'no good for me' vocals." He concluded, "Massive chart action expected". Another editor, James Hamilton, described it as a "typical frantic hardcore 145 2-0bpm [track]". Paul Evans from Rolling Stone said that "with ecstatic vocal snippets, [the song] is as heady an anthem as any in a genre that exults in billboard statements". Gareth Grundy from Select stated that Liam Howlett's "jungle and hardcore roots are still present, but he injects some space and gracious melody between the coruscating rhythm." Mark Frith from Smash Hits praised songs like this as "catchy, twiddly and rather good dance tunes". Richard Proplesch from St. Petersburg Times named it "an energetic remake" of the Kelly Charles' song, that "suffers from an overabundance of nonsensical electronic percussion fills and counter rhythms instead of letting the groove grow naturally."

== Chart performance ==
"No Good (Start the Dance)" was quite successful on the singles chart across Europe and also the band's most successful single release up to that point. The song peaked at number one in both Finland and Greece, and was a number two hit in the Netherlands. In the latter, it held that position on the Dutch Top 40 for one week in August 1994, being held off the top spot by 2 Brothers on the 4th Floor's "Dreams (Will Come Alive)". "No Good (Start the Dance)" entered the top 10 also in Austria (6), Belgium (7), Germany (4), Iceland (4), Norway (7), Scotland (7) and the UK. In the latter, it peaked at number four in its fourth week on the UK Singles Chart on 12 June 1994. It spent two more weeks within the top 10, before leaving. On the UK Dance Singles Chart by Music Week, the song also peaked at number four. Additionally, it was a top-20 hit in Denmark (19) and Spain (12), as well as on the Eurochart Hot 100, where it hit number ten in June same year. In Sweden, "No Good (Start the Dance)" was a top-30 hit, peaking at number 22. Outside Europe, it became a top-10 hit in West Asia, peaking at number six in Israel on 5 July 1994. The single earned a gold record in the UK, with a sale of 400,000 units.

== Music video ==
The music video for "No Good (Start the Dance)", directed by English director Walter Stern combines the humorous flavour of that for the band's previous video for "Out of Space" with the menace of "Firestarter" and "Breathe" videos to come. Filmed in a disused, underground cellar below Spitalfields market in the East End of London, the video features characters dancing to the song whilst the band members prowl around moodily. After Howlett breaks down a plaster wall with a sledgehammer, group member Keith Flint is seen in a straitjacket, eventually being locked into a Plexiglas box-prison which begins to fill with smoke. "No Good (Start the Dance)" was a Box Top on British music television channel The Box in June 1994. It then received heavy rotation on MTV Europe and was A-listed on Germany's VIVA in August 1994. Two months later, it received power play on France's MCM.

Liam Howlett said to Dazed magazine "'No Good... was a response to all that shit Eurodance stuff", and said that the band had started to make better videos. The music video became the last music video to be played on the music channel NME TV directly before its closure at 6:00am on 5 January 2012.

== Track listing ==
=== XL recordings ===
12" vinyl record

1. "No Good (Start the Dance)" (Original Mix) – 6:22
2. "No Good (Start the Dance)" (Bad for You Mix) – 6:52 (remixed by Liam Howlett)
3. "No Good (Start the Dance)" (CJ Bolland Museum Mix) – 5:14

CD single

1. "No Good (Start the Dance)" (Edit) – 4:01
2. "No Good (Start the Dance)" (Bad for You Mix) – 6:52 (remixed by Liam Howlett)
3. "No Good (Start the Dance)" (CJ Bolland Museum Mix) – 5:14
4. "No Good (Start the Dance)" (Original Mix) – 6:22

=== Sony/Dancepool ===
1. "No Good (Start the Dance)" (Edit) – 4:01
2. "No Good (Start the Dance)" (CJ Bolland's Mix) – 5:14
3. "One Love" (Jonny L Remix) – 5:10
4. "Jericho" (Genaside II Remix) – 5:45
5. "G-Force" (Energy Flow) – 5:18

== Charts ==
=== Weekly charts ===
Chart (1994)	Peak position
Australia (ARIA)	45
Austria (Ö3 Austria Top 40)	6
Belgium (Ultratop 50 Flanders)	7
Denmark (IFPI)	19
Europe (Eurochart Hot 100)	10
Finland (Suomen virallinen lista)	1
Germany (GfK)	4
Greece (Pop + Rock)	1
Iceland (Íslenski Listinn Topp 40)	4
Ireland (IRMA)	4
Israel (Israeli Singles Chart)	6
Netherlands (Dutch Top 40)	2
Netherlands (Single Top 100)	3
Norway (VG-lista)	7
Scottish Singles Sales (Official Charts)	7
Spain (AFYVE)	12
Sweden (Sverigetopplistan)	22
Switzerland (Schweizer Hitparade)	8
UK Singles (Official Charts)	4
UK Dance (Music Week)	4
UK Club Chart (Music Week)	37

=== Year-end charts ===
Chart (1994)	Position
Belgium (Ultratop 50 Flanders)	66
Europe (Eurochart Hot 100)	36
Germany (Media Control)	32
Israel (Israeli Singles Chart)	40
Netherlands (Dutch Top 40)	26
Netherlands (Single Top 100)	24
Switzerland (Schweizer Hitparade)	26
UK Singles (OCC)	49

== Certifications ==
Region	Certification	Certified units/sales
Germany (BVMI)	Gold	250,000^{^}
United Kingdom (BPI)	Platinum	600,000^{‡}
^{^} Shipments figures based on certification alone.^{‡} Sales+streaming figures based on certification alone.

== Release history ==
Region	Date	Format(s)	Label(s)	Ref.
United Kingdom	16 May 1994	12-inch vinyl; CD; cassette	XL	
Australia	6 June 1994	CD; cassette	XL	

== Fedde Le Grand and Sultan and Ned Shepard version ==
"No Good"

Single by Fedde Le Grand and Sultan & Ned Shepard
- Released: 23 September 2013
- Length: 3:00
- Label: Spinnin' Records
- Songwriter: Liam Howlett

Fedde Le Grand singles chronology
"Long Way From Home" (2013)	"No Good" (2013)

Sultan & Ned Shepard singles chronology
"Long Way From Home" (2013)	"No Good" (2013)

Music video
- "No Good" on YouTube

In 2013, Dutch house DJ and producer Fedde le Grand and Canadian electronic music duo Sultan & Ned Shepard released a remake of the hit on Spinnin' Records.

The single charted in SNEP, the official French Singles Chart as well as in the "bubbling under" Ultratip in the Belgian (Wallonia) French market Singles Chart.

=== Track listing ===
1. "No Good" (club edit) (3:00)
2. "No Good" (extended mix) (5:17)

=== Charts ===
Chart (2013)	Peak position
Belgium (Ultratip Bubbling Under Flanders)	72
Belgium (Ultratip Bubbling Under Wallonia)	7
France (SNEP)	60
