= The Fat of the Land =

Studio album by the Prodigy
- Released: 30 June 1997
- Recorded: 1995–1997
- Studios: Strongroom (London); Earthbound (Braintree, Essex)
- Genres: Big beat; electropunk; electronic rock; techno; electronica; dance-rock
- Length: 56:21
- Label: XL
- Producer: Liam Howlett

The Prodigy chronology
Music for the Jilted Generation (1994)	The Fat of the Land (1997)	The Dirtchamber Sessions Volume One (1999)

Singles from The Fat of the Land
- 1. "Firestarter" Released: 18 March 1996; 2. "Breathe" Released: 11 November 1996; 3. "Smack My Bitch Up" Released: 17 November 1997

The Fat of the Land is the third studio album by English electronic music group the Prodigy, released on 30 June 1997 through XL Recordings. The album received critical acclaim and topped the UK Albums Chart and the US Billboard 200. As of 2019 it has sold over 10 million copies worldwide, and is their best-selling album.

== Background, artwork and album title ==
While Liam Howlett is generally responsible for the compositions and Maxim Reality is featured on two tracks, this is the first record to include contributions by Keith Flint. The Fat of the Land album cover featured an image of a Halloween moon crab and a new logo, dropping "The" and adding an ant silhouette. The photo of the crab was taken on the Playa Las Gemelas in Manuel Antonio National Park, Costa Rica. The album title comes from the old English phrase 'living off the fat of the land', which means living well or being wealthy.

After the release of single "Firestarter", Howlett joined a PlayStation league for dance musicians organized by Muzik reporter Martin James, who would become his friend and Prodigy's official biographer. Howlett's gaming habits ended up delaying the album for several months, with him eventually asking James to send games to Leeroy Thornhill instead to cut distractions, saying “The record label are on my back about the album and I can’t get on with it ‘cos I’m spending all my time on Tomb Raider.

== Release ==
Released in the first week of July, the album hit number one on the Billboard chart on 19 July 1997. Certified double platinum on 2 December that year, it sold 2,600,000 copies in the United States.

In 1999, The Fat of the Land entered the Guinness World Records as the fastest-selling dance album in the UK. The album was also nominated for Best Alternative Music Album at the 40th Annual Grammy Awards, but lost to Radiohead's OK Computer.

=== Controversy ===
The National Organization for Women objected to the seeming misogyny of "Smack My Bitch Up", though the band maintains that its true interpretation is "doing anything intensely". Liam Howlett observed, "That record was for the fans. Only brainless people get some stupid message out of it ... I'm often misquoted. Some magazine said, 'Liam Howlett says his band are dangerous.' What I said was, 'For this band to survive, it has to be dangerous for us' ... I wasn't saying we were dangerous because we're firestarters and we have spiky hair."

== Reception ==
Professional ratings
Review scores
Source	Rating
AllMusic	4.5/5 stars
Entertainment Weekly	B
The Guardian	5/5 stars
Los Angeles Times	4/4 stars
The New Zealand Herald	4.5/5 stars
NME	8/10
Pitchfork	7.9/10 (1999); 5.9/10 (2018)
Q	5/5 stars
Rolling Stone	3.5/5 stars
Spin	7/10

The album has been featured in a number of music publication lists:

- In 1998, Q readers voted The Fat of the Land the ninth greatest album of all time. In 2000, Q placed it at number 47 in its list of the 100 greatest British albums ever. It has also been ranked number 43 in Q's "Best 50 Albums of Q's Lifetime" list, and was included in their "90 Best Albums of the 1990s" and "50 Best Albums of 1997" lists.
- Rolling Stone included it in their "Essential Recordings of the 90s" list.
- Spin ranked it number 20 on their list of the "Top 20 Albums of the Year [1997]" list.
- Melody Maker ranked it number 13 on their list of "Albums of the Year" for 1997 and number 29 in their 1997 Pazz & Jop Critics' Poll.
- NME ranked it number 17 in their 1997 Critics' Poll.
- In 2000 it was voted number 269 in Colin Larkin's All Time Top 1000 Albums.
- Heavy metal-focused magazine Metal Hammer included it in their 2020 list of the top 10 1997 albums, citing it as "the point at which rave culture collided with metal culture".

The album is included in the book 1001 Albums You Must Hear Before You Die, and was nominated for the 1997 Mercury Music Prize.

Following Flint's death on 4 March 2019, fans used the hashtag 'Firestarter4Number1' on various social media platforms to replicate the song's success by getting it to the number one spot again; this was done out of respect for Keith Flint and to raise awareness of suicide among men. Shortly afterwards, "Firestarter" returned to the Billboard charts, entering number 13 on its Dance/Electronic Digital Song Sales chart in its 26 March 2019 issue.

== Track listing ==
No.	Title	Writer(s)	Length
1.	"Smack My Bitch Up"	Liam Howlett; Cedric Miller; Trevor Randolph; Maurice Smith; Keith Thornton	5:42
2.	"Breathe"	Howlett; Keith Flint; Keith Palmer	5:35
3.	"Diesel Power"	Howlett; Thornton	4:17
4.	"Funky Shit"	Howlett; Michael Diamond; Adam Horovitz; Adam Yauch	5:16
5.	"Serial Thrilla"	Howlett; Flint; Leonard Arran; Deborah Dyer	5:11
6.	"Mindfields"	Howlett; Palmer	5:40
7.	"Narayan"	Howlett; Crispian Mills	9:05
8.	"Firestarter"	Howlett; Flint; Kim Deal; Anne Dudley; Trevor Horn; Gary Langan; Jonathan Jeczalik; Paul Morley	4:41
9.	"Climbatize"	Howlett; Timothy Taylor	6:38
10.	"Fuel My Fire" (L7 cover)	Donita Sparks; Peter Jones; Ross Knight; Bill Walsh	4:19
Total length:			56:27

Japanese edition bonus tracks
No.	Title	Writer(s)	Length
11.	"Molotov Bitch"	Howlett	4:56
12.	"No Man Army"	Howlett; Tom Morello	4:10

2012 reissue bonus: The Added Fat EP
No.	Title	Length
1.	"Smack My Bitch Up" (Noisia Remix)	5:53
2.	"Firestarter" (Alvin Risk Remix)	3:18
3.	"Breathe" (Zeds Dead Remix)	4:36
4.	"Mindfields" (Baauer Remix)	3:51
5.	"Breathe" (The Glitch Mob Remix)	4:25
6.	"Smack My Bitch Up" (Major Lazer Remix)	5:05

== Personnel ==
The Prodigy

- Keith Flint – vocals on "Breathe", "Serial Thrilla", "Firestarter", "Fuel My Fire"
- Liam Howlett – keyboards, synthesizers, sampling, programming
- Maxim Reality – vocals on "Breathe", "Mindfields"
- Leeroy Thornhill – dancing (no musical contributions, appears in liner note photos and music videos only)

Additional musicians

- Kool Keith – vocals on "Diesel Power"
- Crispian Mills – vocals on "Narayan"
- Saffron – vocals on "Fuel My Fire"
- Gizz Butt – guitars on "Fuel My Fire"
- Jim Davies – guitars on "Breathe", "Firestarter"
- Matt Cameron – drums on "Narayan"
- Tom Morello – guitars on "No Man Army"

Other personnel

- Liam Howlett – production, engineering, mixing, art direction
- Neil McLellan – engineering
- Christian Ammann – photography
- JAKe – illustrations
- Alex Jenkins – art direction, design, photography
- Pat Pope – photography
- Alex Scaglia – photography
- Lou Smith – photography
- Terry Whittaker – photography
- Konrad Wothe – photography
- Mike Champion – management

== Charts ==
=== Weekly charts ===
Weekly chart performance
Chart (1997–98)	Peak position
Australian Albums (ARIA)	1
Austrian Albums (Ö3 Austria)	1
Belgian Albums (Ultratop Flanders)	2
Belgian Albums (Ultratop Wallonia)	3
Canadian Albums (Billboard)	1
Czech Albums (ČNS IFPI)	1
Danish Albums (Hitlisten)	2
Dutch Albums (Album Top 100)	1
European Albums (Billboard)	1
Finnish Albums (Suomen virallinen lista)	1
French Albums (SNEP)	2
German Albums (Offizielle Top 100)	1
Hungarian Albums (MAHASZ)	1
Irish Albums (IRMA)	1
Italian Albums (FIMI)	6
New Zealand Albums (RMNZ)	1
Norwegian Albums (VG-lista)	1
Portuguese Albums (AFP)	1
Scottish Albums (Official Charts)	1
Spanish Albums (AFYVE)	1
Swedish Albums (Sverigetopplistan)	1
Swiss Albums (Schweizer Hitparade)	1
UK Albums (Official Charts)	1
UK Dance Albums (Official Charts)	1
US Billboard 200	1

=== Year-end charts ===
1997 year-end chart performance
Chart (1997)	Position
Australian Albums (ARIA)	23
Austrian Albums (Ö3 Austria)	19
Belgian Albums (Ultratop Flanders)	30
Belgian Albums (Ultratop Wallonia)	27
Canadian Albums (Nielsen Soundscan)	24
Dutch Albums (Album Top 100)	13
European Albums (European Top 100 Albums)	10
French Albums (SNEP)	34
German Albums (Offizielle Top 100)	18
New Zealand Albums (RMNZ)	3
Swiss Albums (Schweizer Hitparade)	29
UK Albums (OCC)	6
US Billboard 200	37

1998 year-end chart performance
Chart (1998)	Position
Dutch Albums (Album Top 100)	74
UK Albums (OCC)	78
US Billboard 200	128

=== Singles ===
Year	Song	Chart	Peak position
1996	"Firestarter"	UK Singles Chart	1
1996	"Breathe"	UK Singles Chart	1
1996	"Firestarter"	Australian ARIA Singles Chart	22
1996	"Breathe"	Australian ARIA Singles Chart	2
1997	"Smack My Bitch Up"	UK Singles Chart	8
1997	"Smack My Bitch Up"	Australian ARIA Singles Chart	41
1997	"Smack My Bitch Up"	Canadian Singles Chart	12
1997	"Firestarter"	US Billboard Hot 100	30
1997	"Firestarter"	US Hot Dance Music/Maxi-Singles Sales	11
1997	"Firestarter"	US Modern Rock Tracks	24
1997	"Breathe"	US Modern Rock Tracks	18
1997	"Breathe"	Canadian Singles Chart	65
1997	"Smack My Bitch Up"	US Hot Dance Music/Maxi-Singles Sales	19
1998	"Smack My Bitch Up"	US Billboard Hot 100	89

== Certifications and sales ==
Region	Certification	Certified units/sales
Australia (ARIA)	2× Platinum	140,000^{^}
Austria (IFPI Austria)	Gold	25,000^{*}
Belgium (BRMA)	Platinum	50,000^{*}
Canada (Music Canada)	3× Platinum	300,000^{^}
Finland (Musiikkituottajat)	Platinum	42,426
France (SNEP)	2× Gold	200,000^{*}
Germany (BVMI)	Gold	250,000^{^}
Iceland	—	7,500
Italy (FIMI)	Gold	50,000^{*}
Japan (RIAJ)	Platinum	200,000^{^}
Netherlands (NVPI)	Platinum	100,000^{^}
New Zealand (RMNZ)	Platinum	15,000^{^}
Spain (Promusicae)	Platinum	100,000^{^}
Switzerland (IFPI Switzerland)	Gold	25,000^{^}
Sweden (GLF)	Platinum	80,000^{^}
United Kingdom (BPI)	5× Platinum	1,500,000^{‡}
United States (RIAA)	2× Platinum	2,600,000
Summaries
Europe (IFPI)	2× Platinum	2,000,000^{*}
^{*} Sales figures based on certification alone.^{^} Shipments figures based on certification alone.^{‡} Sales+streaming figures based on certification alone.
