= Midijum Records =

German trance music record label

Midijum Records is a German record label specialising in trance music, particularly progressive trance and psychedelic trance. The label was founded in 1998 by DJ Bim (real name Andreas Binotsch) and is based in Frankfurt am Main, Germany.

Midijum Records has released music from numerous trance artists, including Aerospace, Shayning, Silent Sphere, Auricular (a progressive trance duo from Hamburg), and Mad Contrabender. The label became a subsidiary of Plusquam Records in the 2000s, helping to expand its reach in the European trance and electronic music scenes.

== See also ==
- List of record labels
