= List of number-one hits of 1996 (Denmark) =

This is a list of the Danish Singles Chart number-one hits of 1996 from the International Federation of the Phonographic Industry and Nielsen Soundscan. They were provided through Billboard magazine under the "Hits of the World" section.

== Chart history ==
Issue date	Song	Artist
3 January	"Gangsta's Paradise"	Coolio featuring L.V.
18 January	"Gangsta's Paradise"	Coolio featuring L.V.
25 January	"Missing (The Remix EP)"	Everything But The Girl
1 February	"Spaceman"	Babylon Zoo
8 February	"Spaceman"	Babylon Zoo
15 February	"Spaceman"	Babylon Zoo
22 February	"Spaceman"	Babylon Zoo
29 February	"Spaceman"	Babylon Zoo
7 March	"Spaceman"	Babylon Zoo
14 March	"Spaceman"	Babylon Zoo
21 March	"Spaceman"	Babylon Zoo
28 March	"Spaceman"	Babylon Zoo
4 April	"Spaceman"	Babylon Zoo
11 April	"How Deep Is Your Love"	Take That
18 April	"How Deep Is Your Love"	Take That
25 April	"Children"	Robert Miles
2 May	"Children"	Robert Miles
9 May	"X-Files"	DJ Dado
16 May	"X-Files"	DJ Dado
23 May	"X-Files"	DJ Dado
30 May	"X-Files"	DJ Dado
6 June	"Until It Sleeps"	Metallica
13 June	"Until It Sleeps"	Metallica
20 June	"Macarena"	Los Del Rio
27 June	"Macarena"	Los Del Rio
4 July	"Macarena"	Los Del Rio
11 July	"Macarena"	Los Del Rio
18 July	"Killing Me Softly"	Fugees
25 July	"Killing Me Softly"	Fugees
31 July	"Killing Me Softly"	Fugees
7 August	"Killing Me Softly"	Fugees
14 August	"Killing Me Softly"	Fugees
21 August	"Killing Me Softly"	Fugees
28 August	"Wannabe"	Spice Girls
4 September	"Wannabe"	Spice Girls
11 September	"Wannabe"	Spice Girls
18 September	"Wannabe"	Spice Girls
25 September	"Wannabe"	Spice Girls
3 October	"Wannabe"	Spice Girls
10 October	"Wannabe"	Spice Girls
17 October	"Wannabe"	Spice Girls
24 October	"Wannabe"	Spice Girls
31 October	"Wannabe"	Spice Girls
7 November	"Where Do You Go"	No Mercy
14 November	"Where Do You Go"	No Mercy
21 November	"Where Do You Go"	No Mercy
28 November	"Where Do You Go"	No Mercy
5 December	"Roses Are Red"	Aqua
12 December	"Breathe"	The Prodigy
19 December	"Breathe"	The Prodigy
26 December	"Breathe"	The Prodigy

== See also ==
- 1996 in music
