= The Wrongstar Society =

- Also known as: The Wrongstars
- Origin: Essex, England
- Genres: Big beat, breakbeat, alternative hip hop
- Years active: 2006–present
- Labels: Electric Tastebuds

The Wrongstar Society is an English electronic rock group. Despite their reputation as breakbeat producers, they also have tracks which involve session guitarists, punk rock vocalists and harmonicas.

== Members ==
- James Donoghue - DJ, producer, engineer
- Luke Moore - MC and songwriter
- David Donoghue - DJ, producer and engineer
- Joe Moore - MC and songwriter

The group were first signed to Unstable Label and released their first CD album entitled Beats, Rhymes and Conflicts, on August 4, 2008. "Beautiful" was the group's first single, which received major UK airplay. The group has had regular national radio shows, including interviews on Kiss 100 with Jay Cunning, Galaxy FM with Rennie Pilgrem and BBC Radio 1 with Annie Nightingale.

The Wrongstars are currently signed to Leeroy Thornhill's label 'Electric Tastebuds' and released their first single on this label in March 2009.

== Discography ==
=== Studio albums ===
- 2008: Beats, Rhymes & Conflicts

=== Singles ===
- 2007: "Beautiful" / "Battle" / "Battle (Merka Remix)" (Released on CD, Vinyl & MP3)
- 2007: "Decapitate" / "Bring You Down (Beta Remix)" (Released as an exclusive free promotional track as an MP3 download only)
- 2008: "Give It To Them" / "Freakshow" / "Bring You Down (Affinity remix)" (Released on CD, Vinyl & MP3)
- 2009: "Get Wrong / Dog Brain Soup"

=== Remixes ===
- 2008: "Jagged Slap - 10 Pence Short (The Wrongstars Remix)"
- 2009: "Paul Lyman - Break Through (The Wrongstars Remix)"
- 2009: "Freerange DJ's - Your Mind, Your Passion (The Wrongstars Remix)"
- 2010: "601 - Punch The Clown (The Wrongstars Remix)"
