= Shayning =

Israeli musical artist

Shay Hugi שי חוגי
- Born: April 7, 1981 (age 45)
- Origin: Tel Aviv, Israel
- Genres: Dubstep, drum and bass, electronica, psystep, Psychedelic trance
- Occupations: Producer, DJ
- Labels: ElectroZilla Records, Ring Mode Records, Midijum Records
- Website: Shayning

Shay Hugi (Hebrew: שי חוגי; born April 7, 1981), known professionally as Shayning, is an Israeli dubstep producer and disc jockey (DJ).

== Career ==
He is the founder of ElectroZilla Records and former drummer of Israeli death metal band Uranium. His music incorporates triplet drum patterns with heavy metal influences and he is commonly regarded as pioneering Psystep music subgenre, his music is best known as a mixture between classic traditional Psychedelic trance and Dubstep. He has released tracks under ElectroZilla Records, Ring Mode Records, Midijum Records

== Discography ==
=== Releases ===
- Lobotomized (EP) (2009; Midijum Records / Plusquam Records)
- To The Extreme (EP) (2010; ElectroZilla Records)
- Trippin (Single) (2010; ElectroZilla Records)
- Speed'em All (EP) (2010; ElectroZilla Records)
- Shayning Trance (EP) (2011; ElectroZilla Records)
- Masters of GOA (EP) (2011; Geomagnetic Records)
- Super Powers (VA) (2011; Inner Lotus Records)
- One Step Into The Dub (EP) (2011; Bass Star Records)
- Dubstep To The Bones (EP) (2011; ElectroZilla Records)
- Son Of A Gore (Album) (2011; ElectroZilla Records)
- Im Energy (EP) (2012; ElectroZilla Records)
- Awakening (EP) (2012; Ring Mode Records)
- Mean Girls (EP) (2012; Ring Mode Records)
- Chipstep (Album) (2012; ElectroZilla Records)

=== Remixes ===
- Gataka – Down To Earth (Shayning Remix)
- Sesto Sento – Louder (Shayning Remix)
- 2Pac - There U Go (Shayning Remix)
- The Prodigy - Voodoo People (Shayning Remix)
