= Ramshackle =

Electronic dub group

- Genres: Electronic; Jazz; Rock
- Years active: 1995−?
- Labels: Big Life Music
- Past members: Ben Chapman; Steve Roberts; Johnson Somerset

Ramshackle was an electronic dub group that released two albums and collaborated with such artists as Steve Winwood, Jah Wobble, and Maxi Jazz. They released two albums, "Depthology" and "Chin on the Kerb" in the 1990s and a remixed version of their song, "Eyes, Lips, Body" was included on the Hackers soundtrack.

== Line-up ==
=== Former members ===
- Ben Chapman: Beats, Production
- Steve Roberts: Vocals, Piano
- Johnson Somerset: Synths, Production

=== Guest musicians ===
- Jah Wobble − Bass on Isn't This The Life
- Steve Winwood – Clavinet on Pulse
- Maxi Jazz – Scratching on the Depthology album
- Juan Wells – Vocals on Wannabe
- Val Harrison – Vocals on Wannabe
- Mike McEvoy – Guitar on the Depthology album, Piano on Prayers for the Lonely and Young and Strong
- Luke Brighty – Guitar on Wannabe
- Robin Key – Guitar on Wannabe and Bitter Lies
- Brendan Beale – Piano and Strings on Let Love Reign and Echoes in Red
- Ian Dutt – Loops (some)

== Discography ==
=== Studio albums ===
- Depthology (1995)
- Chin on the Kerb (1997)
