= Invaders Must Die (song) =

2008 song by the Prodigy

Single by the Prodigy

from the album Invaders Must Die
- Released: 26 November 2008
- Recorded: New York City
- Genre: New rave
- Length: 4:55 (album version); 3:25 (radio edit)
- Label: Take Me to the Hospital
- Songwriters: Liam Howlett, Nick Halkes
- Producer: Liam Howlett

The Prodigy singles chronology
"Voodoo People/Out of Space" (2005)	"Invaders Must Die" (2008)	"Omen" (2009)

Music video
- "Invaders Must Die" on YouTube

"Invaders Must Die" is the eighteenth single released by British electronic band the Prodigy. It was released from the band's website as a free digital download on 26 November 2008. It was the first single from the album Invaders Must Die. The download was announced on 24 November, in a newsletter sent to fans, and first aired on Zane Lowe's Radio 1 show as his 'Hottest Record in the World' on 26 November. The song was co-produced by Does It Offend You, Yeah?'s James Rushent. Liam Howlett described this to the Dubai edition of Time Out as: "a very abrasive-sounding electronic track, kind of different to anything we've done before." Although not being a commercial single, the track charted at No. 49 on the UK Singles Chart on 1 March 2009, whilst the Chase & Status remix reached No. 53 on the Australian ARIA singles chart and No. 7 on the ARIA dance chart. On 30 November 2009, the re-amped version by Howlett was released as an EP with the B-side "Mescaline" and remixes of "Thunder".

James Rushent co-produced parts of the song on a laptop while on tour with his band, same with "Omen". He said he would work on the song early in the morning and e-mail it to Liam Howlett.

== Music video ==
The music video features Noel Clarke walking around the British countryside and encountering or creating the Prodigy's "ant" logo. Among other places, he walks past the acoustic mirrors at Denge and at the end he is standing on one of the Maunsell Forts in the Thames Estuary. For a few seconds, the band can be seen in the video.

== Invaders EP ==
"Invaders"

Single by the Prodigy

from the album Invaders Must Die (Special Edition)
- Released: 30 November 2009
- Length: 20:24 (CD); 7:17 (7-inch vinyl record)
- Songwriters: Liam Howlett, Nick Halkes

On 30 November 2009, "Invaders" was released as an EP on CD and limited edition green transparent 7" vinyl. The EP is classed as a single from the Invaders Must Die special edition with 3 bonus tracks and a remix CD, a DVD of the music videos to Invaders Must Die and a 48-page booklet. The Invaders Must Die special edition was released on 3 November 2009.

=== Track listings ===
CD single

1. "Invaders Must Die" (Liam H re-amped version) – 2:56
2. "Mescaline" – 4:58
3. "Thunder" (Arveene & Misk's Storm-Warning remix) – 5:27
4. "Invaders Must Die" (Proxy remix) – 4:03

Limited edition green transparent 7" vinyl

1. "Invaders Must Die" (Liam H re-amped version) – 2:56
2. "Thunder" (Doorly remix) – 4:21

== Personnel ==
=== The Prodigy ===
- Liam Howlett – keyboards, producer, programming

=== Additional musicians ===
- James Rushent – co-producer

== Charts ==
Chart performance of "Invaders Must Die"
Chart (2009)	Peak position
Australia (ARIA) Chase & Status mix	58
UK Singles (Official Charts)	49

== Awards ==
Region	Certification	Certified units/sales
United Kingdom (BPI)	Gold	400,000^{‡}
^{‡} Sales+streaming figures based on certification alone.
