= VidZone =

Online music video service

- Developer: Rants Ltd., SCE
- Type: Video streaming
- Launched: UK/AU/FR/DE/IT/ES/IE: 11 June 2009; NL/PT/AT: 26 November 2009; SE/DK/NO/FI: 3 December 2009; BE/LU/CH/NZ: 10 December 2009; United States: 16 July 2013
- Current version: 2.09
- Platforms: PlayStation 3, PlayStation 4, PlayStation Portable (through Remote Play); Sony and Samsung Android Smartphones, Tablets & Android Smart TVs
- Website: VidZone Official Website

VidZone was one of the largest online music video VOD services in the world, operated by London-based company VidZone Digital Media and Sony Computer Entertainment. The online service provides free streaming of music videos from the VidZone.tv website, in addition to music distribution through a number of mobile networks worldwide. The VidZone catalogue encompasses over 1.5 million tracks, 45,000 music videos and 15,000 realtones, including full access to catalogues from the Universal Music Group, Warner Music, Sony Music and EMI.

VidZone's service was extended to the PlayStation 3 video game system in some PAL territories (UK, France, Germany, Italy, Spain, Australia and Ireland) on 11 June 2009, allowing users to watch music videos on their PS3 or streamed to their PSP via Remote Play. The service was expanded by 11 countries: Belgium, The Netherlands, Sweden, Denmark, Finland, Norway, Luxembourg, Austria, Switzerland, Portugal and New Zealand, during November and December 2009. The service launched in the United States on 16 July 2013.

Initially, the music videos were from artists signed either on Sony Music or the Universal Music Group. On 16 August 2010, VidZone announced they now have a licensing agreement with the former EMI Music company. On 20 June 2013, Warner Music music videos were added to the service, meaning that VidZone has music videos from all three of the major music record labels. There are currently over 85,000 videos on the service.

Just over 8 weeks after launch the VidZone application reached one million in download figures and 100 million video streams while playing host to numerous video exclusives including:

- U2 – I'll Go Crazy If I Don't Go Crazy Tonight
- The Prodigy – Take Me to the Hospital
- Placebo – The Never Ending Why, Ashtray Heart
- Editors – Papillon
- Groove Armada – I Won't Kneel
- The Dead Weather – I Cut Like a Buffalo
- Chase & Status – Hypest Hype
- Noisia – Exodus
- Sub Focus – Splash
- Tiësto – Escape Me

On 12 October 2009, VidZone announced that 1.5 million people have used the service. On 31 December 2009 it was announced that VidZone had become the biggest dedicated music video streaming application in the world having been downloaded 2 million times, and streamed 200 million videos.

On 22 April 2010, VidZone announced they are to launch VidZone TV on PS3, which includes 100 'channels' of pre-loaded music videos, behind-the-scenes videos and live concert footage.

== Vidzone 2.0 ==
On 9 November 2011 Vidzone was updated to version 2.0 which greatly enhanced a number of features of the service.

The UI was completely overhauled to include a new "Zones" functionality, whereby users select a "Zone" for the genre of music they wish to listen to, in order to quickly find all music of that type. This includes the "MyZone" section, where users save playlists. A new recommendation engine was also added, as well as social integration with Facebook and PSN as a whole.

== Samsung Launch ==
On 27 August 2014, Samsung announced that the VidZone service had launched on Samsung smartphones, tablets, and Smart TVs (2013 models onwards). Available via the Samsung/Galaxy Apps and Google Play Store, the ad-funded service is free to Samsung users, with no in-app purchases. Content from the VidZone app can be streamed to Samsung Smart TVs (2014 models onwards) using multi-screen technology and also supports Google Chromecast allowing users to watch playlists and videos on the big screen.

The service initially launched in UK, France, Germany, Italy and Spain. On 3 November, VidZone launched in an additional 11 territories including Netherlands, Belgium, Sweden, Norway, Denmark, Finland, Ireland, Portugal, Austria, Luxembourg and Switzerland.

== Features ==
- Browse over 100,000 music videos
- More than 10 genre 'Zones' to discover videos
- Thousands of expertly curated video playlists
- Full HD video playback
- Play Zone – a dedicated video player with play queue functionality
- My Zone – save your videos and playlists to your own Zone
- Watch a video while searching for the next one using the minimised video player
- Create & synch your playlists with other Samsung devices
