= One Love (The Prodigy song) =

1993 single by the Prodigy

Single by the Prodigy

from the album Music for the Jilted Generation
- Released: 4 October 1993
- Recorded: Essex, England
- Genre: Rave
- Length: 5:50; 3:53 (edit)
- Label: XL
- Songwriter: Liam Howlett
- Producer: Liam Howlett

The Prodigy singles chronology
"Wind It Up (Rewound)" (1993)	"One Love" (1993)	"No Good (Start the Dance)" (1994)

Music video
- "One Love" on YouTube

"One Love" is a song by British electronic music act the Prodigy, released on 4 October 1993 by XL Recordings as the first single from the act's second album, Music for the Jilted Generation (1994). The song, both written and produced by Liam Howlett, peaked at number eight on the UK Singles Chart and number five on the UK Dance Singles Chart. It was also a top-30 hit in Sweden and Switzerland.

== Inspiration ==
Liam Howlett first released the songs "One Love" and "One Love" (Jonny L Remix) as two 12-inch white labels, called "Earthbound 1" and "Earthbound 2".

The version that appeared on the Prodigy's second studio album Music for the Jilted Generation was the shorter edit version due to the band having to trim some running time off the album to allow it to fit on the master CD.

== Critical reception ==
Ian Gittins from Melody Maker felt "One Love" "lacks the maverick, individual quality which distinguished tracks like 'Everybody in the Place', and I's guess it's unlikely to repeat the Prodigy's normal routine chart success." Andy Beevers from Music Week named the song Pick of the Week in the category of Dance and gave it a score of four out of five, calling it a "charging percussion-laden and bass-heavy" track. James Hamilton from the Record Mirror Dance Update described the original mix of "One Love" as "hardcore star's muezzin punctuated surging frantic 148bpm".

== Soundtrack ==
In 1995, "One Love" (along with "Voodoo People") was included in the soundtrack for the movie Hackers, starring Jonny Lee Miller and Angelina Jolie.

== Music video ==
The accompanying music video for the song was created by Hyperbolic Systems and featured computer generated graphics with occasional images of the band members dancing among tribal figures.

== Track listings ==
All songs were written by Liam Howlett.

- 12-inch vinyl
1. "One Love" (original mix) (5:50)
2. "Rhythm of Life" (original mix) (5:05)
3. "Full Throttle" (original mix) (5:28)
4. "One Love" (Jonny L remix) (5:10)
- CD single
1. "One Love" (edit) (3:53)
2. "Rhythm of Life" (original mix) (5:05)
3. "Full Throttle" (original mix) (5:28)
4. "One Love" (Jonny L remix) (5:10)

Note: "One Love" (edit) is named "One Love" (Juliana mix) on the Japanese release

== Charts ==
Weekly chart performance for "One Love"
Chart (1993)	Peak position
Australia (ARIA)	225
Netherlands (Dutch Top 40 Tipparade)	13
Netherlands (Dutch Single Tip)	2
Sweden (Sverigetopplistan)	28
Switzerland (Schweizer Hitparade)	30
UK Singles (Official Charts)	8
UK Airplay (ERA)	78
UK Dance (Music Week)	5
UK Club Chart (Music Week)	26

== Release history ==
Release dates and formats for "One Love"
Region	Date	Format(s)	Label(s)	Ref.
United Kingdom	4 October 1993	12-inch vinyl; CD; cassette	XL	
Australia	10 January 1994	12-inch vinyl; CD	XL	
Japan	21 February 1994	Mini-CD	Avex Trax	
