= Breathe (The Prodigy song) =

1996 single by the Prodigy

Single by the Prodigy

from the album The Fat of the Land
- B-side: "Their Law" (live); "Poison" (live); "The Trick"
- Released: 11 November 1996
- Studio: Earthbound (Braintree, Essex, England)
- Genre: Electronic rock; big beat
- Length: 5:35 (album version); 3:59 (edit)
- Label: XL
- Songwriters: Liam Howlett; Keith Flint; Maxim Reality
- Producer: Liam Howlett

The Prodigy singles chronology
"Firestarter" (1996)	"Breathe" (1996)	"Smack My Bitch Up" (1997)

Music video
- "Breathe" on YouTube

"Breathe" is a song by English electronic dance music band the Prodigy, released in November 1996 by XL Recordings as the second single from their third album, The Fat of the Land (1997). It was written by band members Liam Howlett, Keith Flint and Maxim Reality, featuring a drum break from the song "Johnny the Fox Meets Jimmy the Weed" by Thin Lizzy. The whiplashing sword sound effect is a sample of "Da Mystery of Chessboxin'" by Wu-Tang Clan. As with "Firestarter", Jim Davies played the guitar in the song.

"Breathe" became the group's second consecutive number-one in the United Kingdom and also topped the charts in the Czech Republic, Denmark, Finland, Greece, Hungary, Ireland, Norway, and Sweden. Its music video was directed by Walter Stern, depicting the band in an abandoned, decrepit apartment building. Melody Maker ranked "Breathe" number 29 on their list of the best singles of 1996, and Q magazine featured it on their "1001 Best Songs Ever" in 2003.

== History ==
The first ever performance of the song was held at a concert at the Pionir Hall in Belgrade, Serbia, on 8 December 1995, 11 months prior to its release. The Prodigy was the first major international music act to play in Belgrade since the breakup of Yugoslavia, and came shortly after UN sanctions were partially lifted. "Breathe" thus became an iconic song for Serbia's urban youth.

== Critical reception ==
Larry Flick from Billboard magazine stated that the song, "with its jittery, faux funk beat, caustic synths, and snarling vocals" gets stronger with repeated spins. Nick Varley from The Guardian wrote, "'Firestarter' was only softening us up. Liam Howlett and his assorted helpers have now served up an even more stunning slab of modern genius." He added, "You don't have to be in a club, helped by the strobe lights, to appreciate the appeal as the drum roll cracks into place before giving way to the type of pounding beat that seems to have been the essential ingredient in the great singles of the year. Think 'Firestarter', 'Setting Sun', 'Born Slippy' and Beck's 'Devil's Haircut'." Melody Maker ranked "Breathe" number 29 in their list of "Singles of the Year" in December 1996, naming it "a rarity, this; a Prodigy single that grew on you. Less instant, more insistent — insidious, even. Nervous tension made music." Music Week gave it three out of five, noting that Howlett's "raucous electronic punksters get louder and less accessible by the day. This frantic, apocalyptic number will do well to emulate their spring number one 'Firestarter'."

Paul Moody from NME wrote, "'Breathe' - that rarest of things, a Prodigy track that grows on you - sounds ever more sinister in such claustrophobic surroundings, drilled as it is to a brain-numbing intensity of kick drums over which Keith howls the still baffling lyric, "Twisted animator!"(sic)." A reviewer from People magazine said that songs like this "are cathartic performances capable of spreading dance fever to the stubbornest rock-and-roll head-bangers". James Hyman from the Record Mirror Dance Update praised the track, giving it a top score of five out of five. He added, "The punk-aggressive energy found here echoes landmark anarchist tracks such as the Pistols' 'God Save the Queen' (with its 'no future' cries) and Silver Bullet's 'Ruff Karnage'. Twangy guitar and ever-changing industrial breaks complement all the exhortations."

== Chart performance ==
The song was a major worldwide hit, reaching the top 10 in several countries such as Australia, Austria, Belgium, the Netherlands, New Zealand and Switzerland. "Breathe" was a number-one hit in Denmark, Finland, Greece, Ireland, Norway, Sweden and the United Kingdom. The song was also a hit in France, reaching number 26. In the United States, the song reached number 18 on the Billboard Modern Rock Tracks chart. The single also returned to the Billboard charts after Flint's death, entering number 14 on the Dance/Electronic Digital Songs chart on 16 March 2019.

== Music video ==
The accompanying music video for "Breathe" was directed by English director Walter Stern and took place in what resembled an abandoned, decrepit apartment building, with the band members experiencing various aural, visual and psychological phenomena, with Keith Flint and Maxim representing the phenomena, while Leeroy Thornhill and Liam Howlett are caught in the phenomenon. Various animals, like an alligator, and crickets, make an appearance, evoking different types of phobias. The music video won the 1997 MTV Video Music Award for Viewer's Choice and International Viewer's Choice Award for MTV Europe. This was also the band's final video to feature dancer Leeroy Thornhill.

== Impact and legacy ==
In 2003, Q magazine featured "Breathe" on their "1001 Best Songs Ever". In 2020, Mixmag featured it on their "The Best Basslines in Dance Music", writing, "What nightmares are made of. But inject it into my veins, C'MON!!! The Prodigy reached another level thanks to their 1997 album The Fat of the Land, and 'Breathe', a cloudy whirlwind of twisted Keith Flint vocals, whacking kicks and a funk-licked bassline, definitely played a part in their frenetic rock-rave taking on the world."

== Track listings ==
- UK, Canadian, and Australian CD single
- Australian cassette single
1. "Breathe" (edit) – 3:59
2. "Their Law" (live at Phoenix Festival '96 featuring PWEI) – 5:24
3. "Poison" (live at the Tourhout & Werchter Festival '96) – 5:16
4. "The Trick" – 4:25
- UK 12-inch single

A1. "Breathe" (edit) – 3:59
A2. "The Trick" – 4:25
B1. "Breathe" (instrumental) – 5:35
B2. "Their Law" (live at Phoenix Festival '96 featuring PWEI) – 5:24

- UK cassette single and European CD single
1. "Breathe" (edit) – 3:59
2. "The Trick" – 4:25

== Charts ==
=== Weekly charts ===
Chart (1996–1997)	Peak position
Australia (ARIA)	2
Austria (Ö3 Austria Top 40)	6
Belgium (Ultratop 50 Flanders)	7
Belgium (Ultratop 50 Wallonia)	2
Canada Top Singles (RPM)	65
Canada Rock/Alternative (RPM)	28
Canada (Nielsen SoundScan)	3
Czech Republic (IFPI)	1
Denmark (IFPI)	1
Europe (Eurochart Hot 100)	1
Europe (European Dance Radio)	15
Europe (European Hit Radio)	29
Finland (Suomen virallinen lista)	1
France (SNEP)	26
Germany (GfK)	8
Greece (Pop + Rock)	1
Hungary (Mahasz)	1
Iceland (Íslenski Listinn Topp 40)	4
Ireland (IRMA)	1
Israel (Israeli Singles Chart)	14
Italy (FIMI)	8
Netherlands (Dutch Top 40)	9
Netherlands (Single Top 100)	10
New Zealand (Recorded Music NZ)	3
Norway (VG-lista)	1
Scottish Singles Sales (Official Charts)	1
Sweden (Sverigetopplistan)	1
Switzerland (Schweizer Hitparade)	5
UK Singles (Official Charts)	1
UK Dance (Official Charts)	2
UK Pop Tip Club Chart (Music Week)	37
US Alternative Airplay (Billboard)	18

Chart (2009–2025)	Peak position
UK Dance (Official Charts)	8
UK Indie (Official Charts)	9
UK Singles Sales (Official Charts)	5
UK Streaming (Official Charts)	89
US Dance/Electronic Digital Songs (Billboard)	14

=== Monthly charts ===
Chart (2025)	Peak position
Russia Streaming (TopHit)	93

=== Year-end charts ===
Chart (1996)	Position
Belgium (Ultratop 50 Wallonia)	82
Netherlands (Dutch Top 40)	113
Norway (VG-lista)	8
Sweden (Topplistan)	5
UK Singles (OCC)	14

Chart (1997)	Position
Australia (ARIA)	9
Belgium (Ultratop 50 Wallonia)	61
Europe (Eurochart Hot 100)	20
Germany (Media Control)	52
New Zealand (RIANZ)	7
Romania (Romanian Top 100)	20
Sweden (Topplistan)	26
Switzerland (Schweizer Hitparade)	35
UK Singles (OCC)	101
US Modern Rock Tracks (Billboard)	58

== Certifications ==
Region	Certification	Certified units/sales
Australia (ARIA)	2× Platinum	140,000^{^}
Belgium (BRMA)	Gold	25,000^{*}
Canada (Music Canada)	Platinum	80,000^{‡}
Finland (Musiikkituottajat)	Platinum	10,507
Germany (BVMI)	Gold	250,000^{^}
New Zealand (RMNZ)	Platinum	10,000^{*}
Poland (ZPAV)	Gold	50,000^{*}
Sweden (GLF)	Platinum	30,000^{^}
United Kingdom (BPI)	2× Platinum	1,200,000^{‡}
^{*} Sales figures based on certification alone.^{^} Shipments figures based on certification alone.^{‡} Sales+streaming figures based on certification alone.

== Release history ==
Region	Date	Format(s)	Label(s)	Ref.
United Kingdom	11 November 1996	12-inch vinyl; CD; cassette	XL	
United States	2 June 1997	Alternative radio	Maverick; Mute	

== In popular culture ==
The song is included in a 2012 television commercial for Tooheys Extra Dry. Up until the 2012 PDC World Darts Championship, Dutch darts player Michael van Gerwen used the song as his walk-on theme. The song was also used as the theme tune of the Filipino public service program Aksyon Ngayon broadcast on DZMM during its first iteration. Professional wrestler Al Snow used the song as an entrance theme during his stint in Extreme Championship Wrestling. In episode two of Guy Ritchie's MobLand the song is used when they walk into a club.

== Remixes ==
Alongside other The Fat of the Land songs, Breathe was remixed by The Glitch Mob and Zeds Dead on a sampler titled The Added Fat EP in 2012.

In 2021, two remixes by Rene LaVice featuring RZA were released for the F9 Soundtrack.

Camo & Krooked and Mefjus released a remix of the song in 2022 which was awarded the "Best Remix" award at the Drum & Bass Arena Awards 2022.
