= Poison (The Prodigy song) =

1995 single by the Prodigy

Single by the Prodigy

from the album Music for the Jilted Generation
- Released: 6 March 1995
- Genre: Hip hop; techno; reggae
- Length: 6:42 (album version); 4:05 (95 EQ)
- Label: XL
- Songwriters: Liam Howlett; Keith Palmer
- Producer: Liam Howlett

The Prodigy singles chronology
"Voodoo People" (1994)	"Poison" (1995)	"Firestarter" (1996)

Music video
- "Poison" on YouTube

"Poison" is a song by English electronic music group the Prodigy, released on 6 March 1995 by XL and Mute as the fourth and final single from their second studio album, Music for the Jilted Generation (1994). It was written by Liam Howlett and Maxim Reality, and produced by Howlett. New group member Reality performs the vocals on the track. "Poison" was a number one hit in Finland, while peaking inside the top five in Ireland and Norway. Additionally, it peaked within the top-30 in Sweden and Switzerland. The music video for the song was directed by Walter Stern, depicting the group members mud wrestling.

== Composition ==
The drums in the song are samples from "It's a New Day" by Skull Snaps, "Amen, Brother" by the Winstons, and "Heavy Soul Slinger" by Bernard Purdie.

== Reception ==
=== Critical reception ===
John Bush from AllMusic viewed the song as "excellent". Larry Flick from Billboard magazine noted that it "marks the rave outfit's first foray into hip-hop", adding that "it's an inspired move. The act's penchant for quirky loops and industrial sound effects melds perfectly with the track's approachable downtempo groove." He also described the track as a "juicy jam", voiced by new band member Maxim Reality. Neil Kulkarni from Melody Maker wrote, "You musta been dancing to this for weeks already so you know the plot: lunging bass, razing wah-wah over a surprisingly slow and punishingly phat beat. This is surely Howlett paying dues to all those Ultramagnetic MCs and Schooly D LPs that got some of us through the Eighties." Brad Beatnik from Music Week's RM Dance Update stated that "with its hard hip hop beats yet funky feel, [it] is the stunning stand-out track" of the album. Another RM editor, James Hamilton, declared it as a "ponderously rumbling reggae-ish dub joller". John Harris from NME said, "Distilled excitement, strangely enough. 'Poison' is an atonal, incendiary slab of technofied trip-hop". James Hunter from Vibe named it "an excellent post-techno techno thing that ought to become an enormous, obnoxious hit."

=== Retrospective response ===
In 2020, Mixmag included "Poison" in their list of "The Biggest Drops in Dance Music", writing, "It ain't so easy to write about a tune like this, given how much of an acid-fueled trip you go on listening to 'Poison', taken from The Prodigy's second album Music for the Jilted Generation. Your head's in such a spin you're unsure of where TF you are once it's done. Crow-like caws and devilish synths litter the intro, before it bursts into full-on bass growls and industrial fizz. No wonder it's called 'Poison'. You're completely done in once it's over. Better listen to it again, then." In 2022, Time Out ranked it number 26 in their list of "50 Best '90s Songs", adding, "There are a ton of tracks from the Prodigy that could be included in this list, but none sum up Keith Flint and Liam Howlett's rowdy rave punks better than 'Poison'. The mix of chunky breakbeats, sludgy electronics and wide-eyed carnage was the perfect rhythmical remedy to those who fancied a dab of dance music (and those who wanted to find out what the hell rave culture might have been about), but just couldn't get to grips with the eight-minute Chicago house workouts of the time."

== Chart performance ==
"Poison" reached number one in Finland and was a top-five hit in Norway. The song also reached number 24 in Sweden, and number 23 in Switzerland.

== Artwork ==
The packaging for the CD single follows a theme similar to the song: rat poison. The front cover features a box of said poison, the back shows a picture of a dead and decomposing rodent, and the CD itself has a rat superimposed onto it. The theme of rat poison ties into the music, as the official remix of the song is dubbed "Rat Poison".

== Music video ==
The accompanying music video for "Poison" was directed by English director Walter Stern. The band performs the track in a basement-like location. By the end of the video, the floor has turned into a mud-bath where Keith Flint is mud wrestling with other band members. It was a Box Top on British music television channel The Box in March 1995. The music video was also shown on an episode of Beavis and Butt-head.

== Soundtracks ==
The song is featured on the soundtracks for the 1997 film The Jackal and the 1999 film End of Days. It's also featured briefly in the 1999 Robbie the Reindeer film Hooves of Fire.

It also appeared on the FIFA 21 Volta football soundtrack.

== Legacy ==
The spoken words in the introduction of the album-version are:

"Liam, someone on the phone for you / Aw fuck's sake, tryin' to write this fuckin' tune, man"

They were parodied by Clark on his remix of Milanese's “Mr Bad News”, where a voices with an affected received pronunciation English accent say “Christopher, somebody's on the telephone for you / Oh for fuck’s sake, I’m trying to write this fucking tune, man”.

Electronic rock band Does It Offend You, Yeah? also make reference to the track's opening conversation on their song "We Are the Dead" from their album Don't Say We Didn't Warn You.

== Track listing ==
1. "Poison" (95 EQ) – 6:12 [edited 4:05 version on CD edition]
2. "Rat Poison" – 5:34
3. "Scienide" – 5:54
4. "Poison" (Environmental Science Dub Mix) – 6:18
- Tracks 1–2 and 4 written by Liam Howlett and Keith Palmer. Track 2 remixed by Liam Howlett. Track 4 remix and additional production by Environmental Science
- Track 3 written by Liam Howlett

== Charts ==
=== Weekly charts ===
Chart (1995)	Peak position
Australia (ARIA)	64
Finland (Suomen virallinen lista)	1
Ireland (IRMA)	3
Israel (Israeli Singles Chart)	23
Netherlands (Dutch Top 40 Tipparade)	5
Netherlands (Single Top 100 Tipparade)	8
Norway (VG-lista)	5
Scotland (OCC)	25
Sweden (Sverigetopplistan)	24
Switzerland (Schweizer Hitparade)	23
UK Singles (Official Charts)	15
UK Dance (OCC)	22
UK Club Chart (Music Week)	47

Chart (1996)	Peak position
Scotland (OCC)	80
UK Singles (OCC)	62

Chart (2009)	Peak position
UK Dance (OCC)	7

=== Year-end charts ===
Chart (1995)	Position
Latvia (Latvijas Top 50)	78

== Certifications ==
Region	Certification	Certified units/sales
United Kingdom (BPI)	Silver	200,000^{‡}
^{‡} Sales+streaming figures based on certification alone.

== Release history ==
Region	Date	Format(s)	Label(s)	Ref.
United Kingdom	6 March 1995	12-inch vinyl; CD; cassette	XL	
Australia	8 May 1995	CD; cassette	XL; Dance Pool	
