= Dele Fadele =

English musician and music journalist

- Born: Ayodele Fadele; 8 August 1962; Highbury, London, England
- Died: March 2018 (aged 55); London, England
- Occupation: Journalist

Ayodele Fadele (8 August 1962 – March 2018) was an English musician and music journalist who was active from the mid-1980s. He wrote for the NME in the late 1980s and early 1990s, and was one of the first music critics to introduce then emerging US rap artists such as Public Enemy, De La Soul and A Tribe Called Quest to mainstream British music fans.

Fadele had broad musical tastes, ranging from hip-hop and acid house to shoegazing, industrial and grunge. He wrote long pieces on artists including Nick Cave, New Order, 808 State, Einstürzende Neubauten, Marianne Faithfull and Osibisa. He was gregarious and according to Andrew Collins was always "absolutely impassioned" when he arrived at the NME office each morning

He died in March 2018 from stomach cancer. His death was not known to his former music industry colleagues until August 2020.

== Early life ==
Ayodele Fadele was born in Highbury, London, on 8 August 1962 but raised in Ibadan, Nigeria, where his father practised as an architect. He had three brothers and two sisters. He later studied civil engineering at Syracuse University in New York.

== Career ==
In the 1990s, Fadele was a member of the electronic band Welfare Heroin. Fadele was always outspoken; Courtney Love described his damning review of Hole's 1991 gig at the Camden Underworld as "the worst" review she had ever received. In the article, Fadele described hearing the band as akin to "suddenly [feeling] a dark cloud descends and you're enveloped by gloom". He continued: "Hole's...ability to depress in the name of entertainment is unrivalled."

In 1992, Fadele was the first critic to allege that Morrissey was adopting the imagery of right-wing politics and anti-immigration attitudes, when he said the singer was "fanning the flames of race-hate". In the article, Fadele asked: "So, could the same writer harbour such seemingly ignorant thoughts as "England for the English" (his inverted commas) considering his beloved England's past colonial adventures?"

Neither Fadele nor NME were apparently ever forgiven by Morrissey – according to The Guardian, "When ... the paper's sole black writer Dele Fadele persuaded NME's editors to publish a critical cover story about it, Morrissey refused to speak to the magazine for 12 years."

== Death ==
Fadele died after a short illness with stomach cancer in March 2018. He had been out of contact with fellow music journalists for a number of years, and his death was only noticed by the UK press in August 2020 when it was reported that he had died two years earlier. Former Melody Maker writer Simon Price was one of the first to hear, and on 21 August 2020 tweeted, "Word has been slowly breaking that Dele Fadele, the legendary NME writer, passed away two years ago." The news was met with widespread tributes.

Writing for The Quietus in an article published that day, John Doran said that Fadele was "one of those gloriously larger than life figures who instantaneously makes you realise that it is sometimes the music writers and photographers who live much wilder lives than the media-managed stars they document." Musician and writer John Robb wrote how Fadele's "deep love of music was hypnotic ... we would spend hours talking about noise rock, hip hop and afrobeat – he was incredibly clued up on a myriad of musical styles and was a completely switched on and inspiring presence."

Fellow NME journalist David Quantick said that he "Learned last night that Dele Fadele had died, some time ago. He was a brilliant friend, a lovely man and a fantastic writer. And he sneaked into a lot of record collections with Welfare Heroine's [sic] cover of 'Where Do You Go To My Lovely'."

Chuck D of Public Enemy said that Fadele was the "first black journalist from the UK that ever interviewed me", and that he "thought that was amazing. And it was for our first important spread in the UK music press too."
