= Voodoo People =

1994 single by the Prodigy

Single by the Prodigy

from the album Music for the Jilted Generation
- Released: 12 September 1994
- Studio: Essex, England
- Genre: Techno; breakbeat; breakbeat hardcore
- Length: 6:27 (album version)
- Label: XL
- Songwriter: Liam Howlett
- Producer: Liam Howlett

The Prodigy singles chronology
"No Good (Start the Dance)" (1994)	"Voodoo People" (1994)	"Poison" (1995)

Alternate cover
- US cover

"Voodoo People" is a song by British electronic music group the Prodigy, released on 12 September 1994 as the third single from their second studio album, Music for the Jilted Generation (1994), and as their eighth single overall. It was both written and produced by group member Liam Howlett and released as a 12-inch single and in EP format in the United States in 1995 through Mute Records. The guitar riff, based on "Very Ape" by Nirvana, is played by Lance Riddler. The accompanying music video was directed by Walter Stern and Russell Curtis and filmed in Saint Lucia.

== Critical reception ==
Spence Dookey from the Gavin Report remarked that "Voodoo People" "unleashes fiery fuzztronics that blaze and smolder amidst autobahn speed chase rhythms and red alert sirens." British columnist James Masterton wrote, "The new single has little of the commercial charm or potential of that last hit ('No Good (Start the Dance)'), but its a creditable chart performance nonetheless." Calvin Bush from Melody Maker commented, "It's official. The Prodigy are a feral Led Zep for the Nineties, swamping psychedelic techno with the bluesiest of jungle rhythms and ruff-metal riffing. DJs who don't road-test this should be pitied for their petty snobbery." Another Melody Maker editor, Ian Gittins, felt it "is jungle almost bereft of The Prodigy's normal bubblegum quota but will doubtless smack into the upper reaches of the chart regardless."

Maria Jimenez from Music & Media complimented it as a "superb break-beat track". Andy Beevers from Music Week gave it a full score of five out of five and named it Pick of the Week in the category of Dance, adding that "this is one of their most accessible tracks with its rock guitar riffs and flute flurries." Dele Fadele from NME felt that "Voodoo People" "likens the rave scenario to a black magic ritual. With the Prodigy as witchdoctor, of course." Another NME editor, Iestyn George, called it "a mean piece of breakbeat techno with jungle overtones" that serves as the "perfect appetiser" from the album. Brad Beatnik from the RM Dance Update wrote, "It's a sort of Jethro Tull-goes-hardcore and the result is a brilliant slice of uncompromising yet defiantly commercial techno." Another RM editor, James Hamilton, described it as "psychedelic guitar and flute prodded flurrying tribal techno" in his weekly dance column. English pop-punk duo Shampoo reviewed the song for Smash Hits, giving it a score of three out of five.

== Music videos ==
The original music video for "Voodoo People", directed by Walter Stern and Russell Curtis, was filmed on location in Saint Lucia, an island country in the eastern Caribbean, and featured Leeroy Thornhill as a voodoo priest. This version included scenes featuring real witch doctors, but these were cut because of problems with television censorship. A number of other more graphic versions of the video are available, one of them appearing in the Prodigy's Electronic Punks documentary. It was released in late July 1994 and was inspired by voodoo-related films such as Live and Let Die. "Voodoo People" was a Box Top on British music television channel The Box in October 1994. Same month, it received "prime break out" rotation on MTV Europe.

== Remixes and covers ==
The song has been covered by Refused and British funk band 6ix Toys as well remixed by Pendulum (see Voodoo People (Pendulum Remix)) and other known and less known artists such as Eskimo, Alvaro and Shayning. Croatian cello duo 2Cellos have recorded an instrumental version for their album In2ition and have been performing it live on their subsequent tour.

== Track listing ==
UK 12-inch vinyl

Side one
No.	Title	Length
1.	"Voodoo People" (Original Mix)	6:28
2.	"Voodoo People" (Haiti Island Remix)	5:22

Side two
No.	Title	Length
1.	"Voodoo People" (Dust Brothers Remix)	5:56
2.	"Goa (The Heat the Energy Part 2)"	6:04

US 12-inch vinyl

Side one
No.	Title	Length
1.	"Voodoo People" (Dust Brothers Remix)	5:56
2.	"Voodoo People" (Original Mix)	6:28

Side two
No.	Title	Length
1.	"No Good (Start the Dance)" (CJ Bolland Museum Remix)	5:14
2.	"Speedway (Theme from Fastlane)" (Secret Knowledge Remix)	10:26

Benelux CD single

No.	Title	Length
1.	"Voodoo People" (Edit)	4:05
2.	"Voodoo People" (Dust Brothers Remix)	5:56

CD single

No.	Title	Length
1.	"Voodoo People" (Edit)	4:05
2.	"Voodoo People" (Dust Brothers Remix)	5:56
3.	"Goa (The Heat the Energy Part 2)"	6:04
4.	"Voodoo People" (Original Mix)	6:28

North American EP

No.	Title	Length
1.	"Voodoo People" (Edit)	4:07
2.	"Voodoo People" (Dust Brothers Remix)	5:56
3.	"No Good (Start the Dance)" (CJ Bolland Museum Remix)	5:13
4.	"Rat Poison"	5:31
5.	"Speedway (Theme from Fastlane)" (Secret Knowledge Remix)	10:25
6.	"Voodoo People" (Haiti Island Mix)	5:25
7.	"Voodoo People" (Original Mix)	6:26

== Charts ==
=== Weekly charts ===
Chart (1994–1995)	Peak position
Australia (ARIA)	24
Belgium (Ultratop 50 Flanders)	26
Europe (Eurochart Hot 100)	20
Finland (Suomen virallinen lista)	1
Ireland (IRMA)	7
Israel (Israeli Singles Chart)	11
Netherlands (Dutch Top 40)	14
Netherlands (Single Top 100)	20
Scottish Singles Sales (Official Charts)	14
Sweden (Sverigetopplistan)	32
Switzerland (Schweizer Hitparade)	36
UK Singles (Official Charts)	13
UK Dance (Official Charts)	6
UK Club Chart (Music Week)	35

Chart (2005)	Peak position
Canada (Nielsen SoundScan)	10

=== Year-end charts ===
Chart (1994)	Position
Netherlands (Dutch Top 40)	131
UK Singles (OCC)	168

== Certifications ==
Region	Certification	Certified units/sales
United Kingdom (BPI)	Platinum	600,000^{‡}
United Kingdom (BPI) "Voodoo People" / "Out of Space"	Silver	200,000^{‡}
^{‡} Sales+streaming figures based on certification alone.

== Release history ==
Region	Date	Format(s)	Label(s)	Ref.
United Kingdom	12 September 1994	12-inch vinyl; CD; cassette	XL	
Australia	19 September 1994	12-inch vinyl; CD	XL; Dance Pool	
Australia	21 November 1994	Cassette	XL; Dance Pool	
