= Firestarter (The Prodigy song) =

1996 single by the Prodigy

Single by the Prodigy

from the album The Fat of the Land
- B-side: "Molotov Bitch"
- Released: 18 March 1996
- Recorded: Essex, United Kingdom
- Genre: Big beat; rave; alternative rock; drum and bass
- Length: 4:42 (album version); 3:45 (edit)
- Label: XL
- Songwriters: Liam Howlett; Keith Flint; Trevor Horn; Anne Dudley; J.J. Jeczalik; Paul Morley; Gary Langan; Kim Deal
- Producer: Liam Howlett

The Prodigy singles chronology
"Poison" (1995)	"Firestarter" (1996)	"Breathe" (1996)

Music video
- "Firestarter" on YouTube

"Firestarter" is a song by British electronic dance music band the Prodigy, released on 18 March 1996 by XL Recordings as the first single from their third album, The Fat of the Land (1997). It was co-written and produced by Liam Howlett and features vocals by Keith Flint. It was the group's first number-one single on the UK Singles Chart and topped the charts of four other countries. The music video was directed by Walter Stern and filmed in the London Underground, in black-and-white. Melody Maker ranked the song number two in their list of "Singles of the Year" in 1996. 24 years later, The Guardian ranked it number eight in their list of "The 100 Greatest UK No 1 Singles".

== Composition ==
The songwriting credits include Kim Deal of alternative rock group the Breeders, as the looped wah-wah guitar riff in "Firestarter" was sampled from the Breeders' track "S.O.S." from the album Last Splash. The drums are sampled from a remix of the song "Devotion" of the group Ten City. The "hey" sample is from the 1984 song "Close (to the Edit)" by Art of Noise. Then-members Anne Dudley, Trevor Horn, J. J. Jeczalik, Gary Langan and Paul Morley also receive songwriting credits. The "Empirion Mix", which does not include these samples, is credited solely to Liam Howlett and Keith Flint.

== Critical reception ==
Martin James from Melody Maker wrote, "'Firestarter' finds onstage dancer, MC and man of scary eye make-up Keith Flint delivering his first vocal performance and...it's not really up to much. A 60-Marlboros-a-day growl more suited to guitar-drenched cider punk than The Prodigy's fast and furious cyber punk. Never mind though, because musically this cut finds the boys slamming through an exhilarating, breakbeat techno theme for snowboarding freestylers. Half-pipe hardcore — you know the score." A reviewer from Music Week gave "Firestarter" top score of five out of five, and named it Single of the Week and a "Powerful return for the kings of live techno." Gerald Martinez from New Sunday Times noted its "heavy metal meets techno-dance stylisations".

Brad Beatnik from the Record Mirror Dance Update described it as "a typically searing chunk of heavy techno featuring some manic vocale and an awesome synth line". He concluded, "Straight in the Top 10, no question, and destined to be pounded in the clubs." Writing for Pitchfork in 2005, Jess Harvell said, "'Firestarter' sounds like Trent Reznor in one of his all-too-rare moments of self-aware humor, like the Bomb Squad at +5 with a pink-haired British bulldog bellowing about how tuff he is." DJ Freshy-D of Smash Hits gave it four out of five, saying, "Mad metal guitary bits, scary vocals and the bangin'est of beats make for a momentous indie-dance track! Hey, 'Firestarter' even manages to make the Chemical Brothers sound soft... LET'S ROCK!" David Sinclair from The Times noted, "A racing, twitchy, all-hands-on-deck rhythmic pulse, with a first beat in the bar that lands like a bodyblow, it is spiced up by a siren-wail synth sound and various shrieks that resemble an Art of Noise vocal sample."

== Music video ==
The accompanying black-and-white music video for "Firestarter" was directed by Walter Stern and was filmed in an abandoned London Underground tunnel at Aldwych. The video was subsequently banned by the BBC after it was shown on Top of the Pops and supposedly terrorised children.

== Impact and legacy ==
In December 1996, Melody Maker ranked "Firestarter" number two in their list of "Singles of the Year", writing, "Bringing vague but keenly felt terror to a million living rooms, "Firestarter" was superbly ominous, a funny, freakish and pulse-quickening rumble through the tunnels of the psychotic mind." In October 2011, NME placed it at number 52 in its list "150 Best Tracks of the Past 15 Years". In 2017, Billboard magazine ranked "Firestarter" number 25 in their list of "The 100 Greatest Pop Songs of 1997". Following Keith Flint's death on 4 March 2019, fans used the hashtag 'Firestarter4Number1' on various social media platforms to replicate the song's success by getting it to the number one spot again. This was done out of respect for Flint and to raise awareness of suicide among men.

During this time the single also returned to the US Billboard charts, entering number 13 on its Dance/Electronic Digital Songs Sales chart in its 16 March 2019 issue, marking the first time that this song has appeared on a Billboard dance chart. In June 2020, The Guardian ranked "Firestarter" number eight in their list of "The 100 Greatest UK No 1 Singles". Same year, British footballer and MC Kamakaze (a.k.a. Matt Robinson) named it one of "The Best Tunes from the 90's". In July 2022, Rolling Stone ranked it number 110 in their list of "200 Greatest Dance Songs of All Time". In March 2025, Billboard ranked it number 47 in their "The 100 Best Dance Songs of All Time", writing that it "was less of a lit fuse than a powder keg ready to blow everything to smithereens."

"Firestarter" was also used in the Call of Duty: Black Ops 6 reveal trailer and the films Charlie's Angels: Full Throttle (2003), The Condemned (2007), Fear Street Part One: 1994 (2021), and Sonic the Hedgehog 3 (2024), as well as in the Numb3rs (2005) episode "Scorched" and the cold opening of The Beauty (2026).

== Track listings ==
- UK, Australian, and Japanese CD single
- US maxi-CD single
1. "Firestarter" (edit) – 3:45
2. "Firestarter" (Empirion mix) – 7:49
3. "Firestarter" (instrumental) – 4:39
4. "Molotov Bitch" – 4:51
- UK and US 12-inch single

A1. "Firestarter" – 4:40
A2. "Firestarter" (instrumental) – 4:39
B1. "Firestarter" (Empirion mix) – 7:49
B2. "Molotov Bitch" – 4:51

- UK cassette single
1. "Firestarter" (edit) – 3:45
2. "Molotov Bitch" – 4:51
- European CD single
1. "Firestarter" (edit) – 3:45
2. "Firestarter" (Empirion mix) – 7:49
- US CD single and cassette single
1. "Firestarter" (edit)
2. "Firestarter" (instrumental)

== Charts ==
=== Weekly charts ===
Chart (1996–1997)	Peak position
Australia (ARIA)	22
Austria (Ö3 Austria Top 40)	8
Belgium (Ultratop 50 Flanders)	17
Belgium (Ultratop 50 Wallonia)	15
Canada (Nielsen SoundScan)	3
Canada Rock/Alternative (RPM)	10
Czech Republic (IFPI CR)	1
Denmark (IFPI)	7
Europe (Eurochart Hot 100)	2
Europe (European Dance Radio)	11
Finland (Suomen virallinen lista)	1
Germany (GfK)	6
Hungary (Mahasz)	1
Iceland (Íslenski Listinn Topp 40)	8
Ireland (IRMA)	2
Israel (Israeli Singles Chart)	12
Italy (Musica e dischi)	18
Netherlands (Dutch Top 40)	8
Netherlands (Single Top 100)	14
New Zealand (Recorded Music NZ)	3
Norway (VG-lista)	1
Scottish Singles Sales (Official Charts)	3
Sweden (Sverigetopplistan)	2
Switzerland (Schweizer Hitparade)	11
UK Singles (Official Charts)	1
UK Dance (Official Charts)	2
UK Club Chart (Music Week)	19
US Billboard Hot 100	30
US Alternative Airplay (Billboard)	24
US Dance Singles Sales (Billboard)	11

Chart (2019)	Peak position
US Dance/Electronic Digital Songs (Billboard)	13

=== Year-end charts ===
Chart (1996)	Position
Belgium (Ultratop 50 Flanders)	56
Belgium (Ultratop 50 Wallonia)	58
Europe (Eurochart Hot 100)	27
Germany (Media Control)	39
Iceland (Íslenski Listinn Topp 40)	69
Netherlands (Dutch Top 40)	48
Netherlands (Single Top 100)	61
Norway (VG-lista)	14
Sweden (Topplistan)	13
Switzerland (Schweizer Hitparade)	39
UK Singles (OCC)	15

Chart (1997)	Position
New Zealand (RIANZ)	9
US Maxi-Singles Sales (Billboard)	46

== Certifications ==
Region	Certification	Certified units/sales
Finland (Musiikkituottajat)	Gold	6,452
New Zealand (RMNZ)	Platinum	10,000^{*}
Sweden (GLF)	Gold	15,000^{^}
United Kingdom (BPI)	2× Platinum	1,200,000^{‡}
United States (RIAA)	Gold	500,000^{^}
^{*} Sales figures based on certification alone.^{^} Shipments figures based on certification alone.^{‡} Sales+streaming figures based on certification alone.

== Release history ==
Region	Date	Format(s)	Label(s)	Ref.
United Kingdom	18 March 1996	12-inch vinyl; CD; cassette	XL	
Japan	22 May 1996	CD	Avex Trax	

== Cover versions ==
"Weird Al" Yankovic created a loose parody of "Firestarter", titled "Lousy Haircut", for an episode of The Weird Al Show; he could not do a full parody of the song as the network CBS did not want to pay royalties to the Prodigy. The song has also been covered by Jimmy Eat World, Gene Simmons of Kiss, Torre Florim of De Staat, Sepultura, Papa Roach, and Kristina Esfandiari under her project NGHTCRWLR. A cover has also been created for the video game Just Cause 3 by Torre Florim.

== See also ==
- Wipeout 2097
