= List of UK top-ten singles in 1992 =

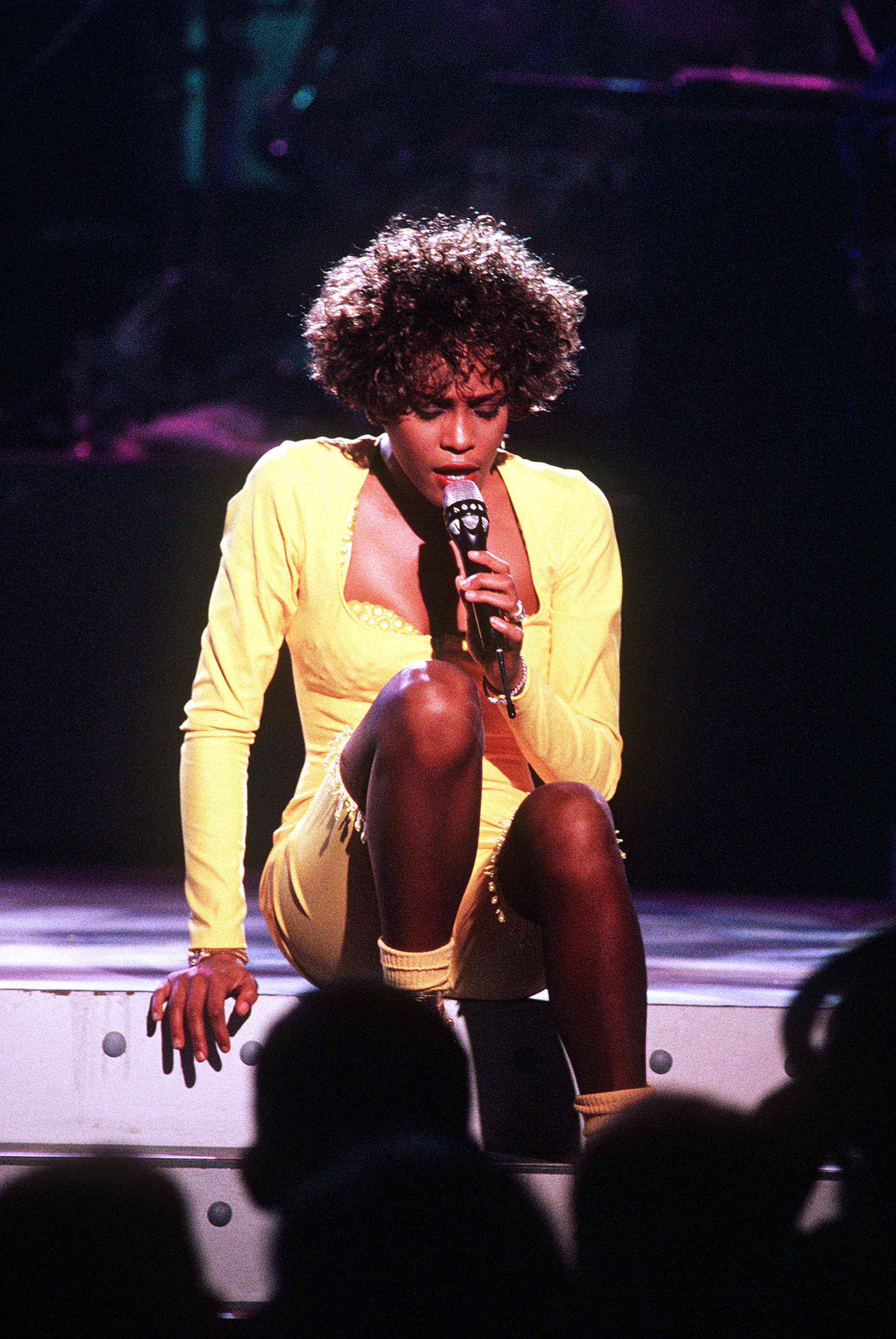
Whitney Houston had the best-selling single of 1992, "I Will Always Love You", which spent ten weeks at number-one and a total of fifteen weeks in the top 10.

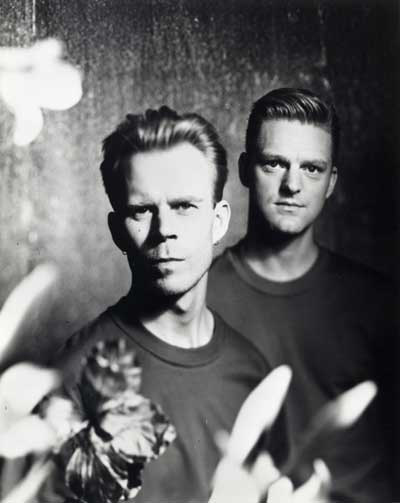
Erasure achieved three top 10 singles this year, including their only UK number-one, the "Abba-esque (EP)", which topped the chart for five weeks.

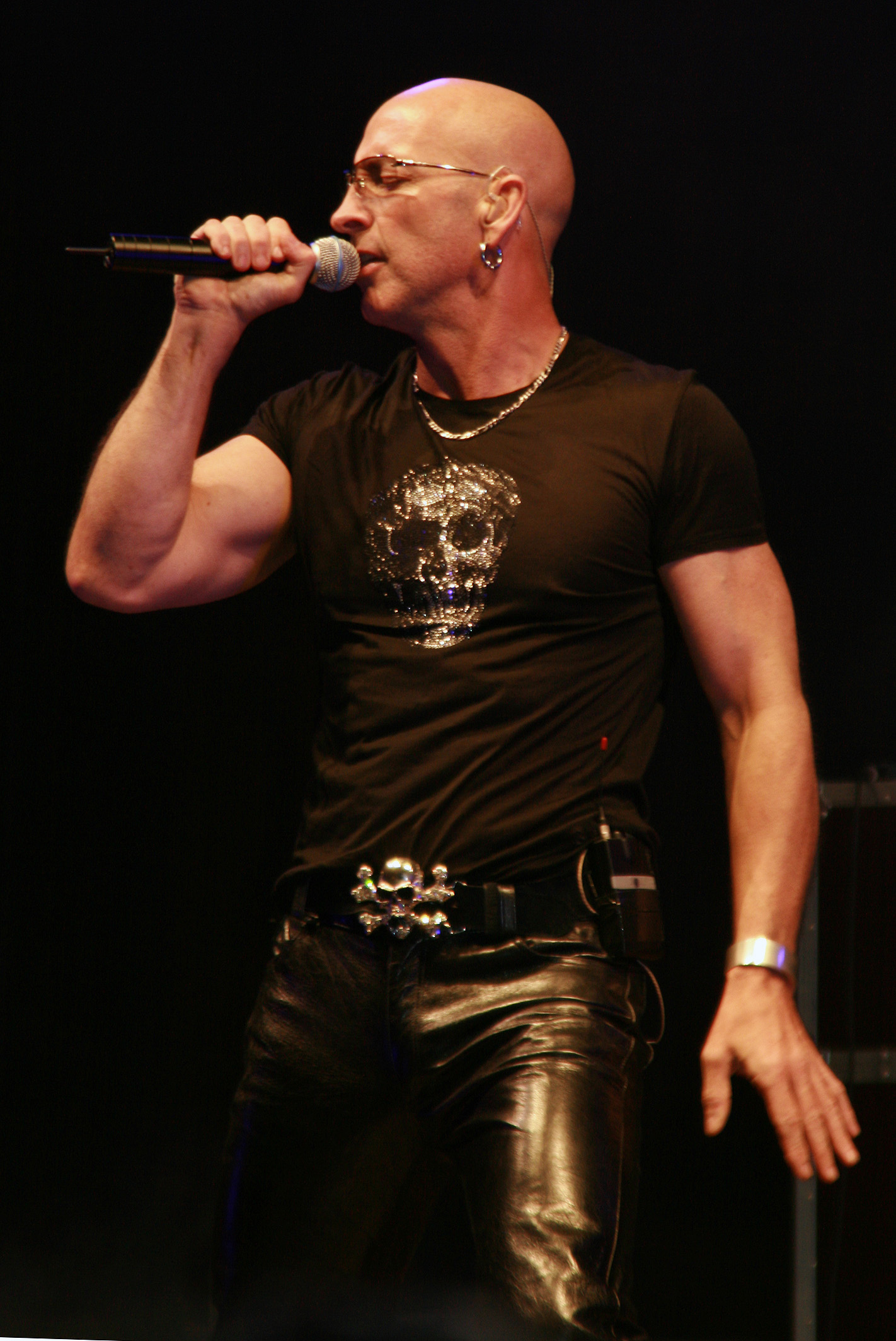
Richard Fairbrass (pictured in 2008) and his group Right Said Fred scored two top 10 hits in 1992, including their only UK number-one, "Deeply Dippy", which spent three weeks at the top of the chart.

The UK Singles Chart is one of many music charts compiled by the Official Charts Company that calculates the best-selling singles of the week in the United Kingdom. Before 2004, the chart was only based on the sales of physical singles. This list shows singles that peaked in the Top 10 of the UK Singles Chart during 1992, as well as singles which peaked in 1991 and 1993 but were in the top 10 in 1992. The entry date is when the single appeared in the top 10 for the first time (week ending, as published by the Official Charts Company, which is six days after the chart is announced).

One-hundred and forty-five singles were in the top ten in 1992. Ten singles from 1991 remained in the top 10 for several weeks at the beginning of the year, while "Could It Be Magic" by Take That was released in 1992 but did not reach its peak until 1993. "Addams Groove" by MC Hammer, "Don't Talk Just Kiss" by Right Said Fred, "Justified & Ancient" by The KLF featuring Tammy Wynette, "Roobarb and Custard" by Shaft and "Too Blind to See It" by Kym Sims were the singles from 1991 to reach their peak in 1992. Twenty-seven artists scored multiple entries in the top 10 in 1992. Celine Dion, East 17, Kris Kross, Manic Street Preachers and Take That were among the many artists who achieved their first UK charting top 10 single in 1992.

The 1991 Christmas number-one, "Bohemian Rhapsody"/"These Are the Days of Our Lives" by Queen, remained at number-one for the first three weeks of 1992. The first new number-one single of the year was "Goodnight Girl" by Wet Wet Wet. Overall, twelve different singles peaked at number-one in 1992, with twelve unique artists having singles hit that position.

== Background ==
=== Multiple entries ===
One-hundred and forty-five singles charted in the top 10 in 1992, with one-hundred and thirty-nine singles reaching their peak this year.

Twenty-seven artists scored multiple entries in the top 10 in 1992. American singer Michael Jackson and dance group The Shamen shared the record for the most top ten singles in 1992 with four hit singles each. Jackson's highest-charting single of the year was "Heal the World", which peaked at number two in November. He reached the top 10 with a further three singles in 1992: "In the Closet", which charted at number eight; "Who Is It" (number 10) and "Remember the Time" (number three). The Shamen also had four top ten entries in 1992, with their highest-charting single, "Ebeneezer Goode", spending four weeks at number-one. Solo artists CeCe Peniston, Madonna and Freddie Mercury, and bands Erasure, Take That and Guns N' Roses each reached the top 10 on three occasions.

Shakespears Sister were one of a number of artists with two top-ten entries, including the number-one single "Stay". Annie Lennox, The Cure, George Michael, Prince and U2 were among the other artists who had multiple top 10 entries in 1992.

=== Chart debuts ===
Forty-four artists achieved their first top 10 single in 1992, either as a lead or featured artist. Of these, three went on to record another hit single that year: Curtis Stigers, KWS and Undercover. CeCe Peniston and Take That both had two other entries in their breakthrough year.

The following table (collapsed on desktop site) does not include acts who had previously charted as part of a group and secured their first top 10 solo single.

Artist	Number of top 10s	First entry	Chart position	Other entries
CeCe Peniston	3	"We Got a Love Thang"	6	"Finally" (2), "Keep On Walkin'" (10)
Curtis Stigers	2	"I Wonder Why"	5	"You're All That Matters to Me" (6)
Kicks Like a Mule	1	"The Bouncer"	7	—
Ride	1	"Leave Them All Behind"	9	—
Shanice	1	"I Love Your Smile"	2	—
Opus III	1	"It's a Fine Day"	5	—
Crowded House	1	"Weather with You"	7	—
Mr. Big	1	"To Be with You"	3	—
Vanessa Williams	1	"Save the Best for Last"	3	—
Mr. Bean	1	"(I Want to Be) Elected"	9	—
Smear Campaign	1	"(I Want to Be) Elected"	9	—
SL2	1	"On a Ragga Tip"	2	—
Carter the Unstoppable Sex Machine	1	"The Only Living Boy in New Cross"	7	—
Ten Sharp	1	"You"	10	—
KWS	2	"Please Don't Go"/"Game Boy"	1	"Rock Your Baby" (8)
The Wedding Present	1	"Come Play with Me"	10	—
Ugly Kid Joe	1	"Everything About You"	3	—
Celine Dion	1	"Beauty and the Beast"	9	—
Shut Up and Dance	1	"Raving I'm Raving"	2	—
Kris Kross	1	"Jump"	2	—
Faith No More	1	"Midlife Crisis"	10	—
Take That	3	"It Only Takes a Minute"	7	"A Million Love Songs" (7), "Could It Be Magic" ^{[A]}
The Orb	1	"Blue Room"	8	—
Smart E's	1	"Sesame's Treet"	2	—
Urban Hype	1	"A Trip to Trumpton"	6	—
Billy Ray Cyrus	1	"Achy Breaky Heart"	3	—
Luther Vandross	1	"The Best Things In Life Are Free"	2	—
Jon Secada	1	"Just Another Day"	5	—
Felix	1	"Don't You Want Me"	6	—
Undercover	2	"Baker Street"	2	"Never Let Her Slip Away" (5)
Dr. Alban	1	"It's My Life"	2	—
Manic Street Preachers	1	"Suicide Is Painless (Theme from M.A.S.H.)"	7	—
The Fatima Mansions	1	"Everything I Do (I Do It for You)"	7	—
East 17	1	"House of Love"	10	—
Tasmin Archer	1	"Sleeping Satellite"	1	—
Boyz II Men	1	"End of the Road"	1	—
Angie Brown	1	"I'm Gonna Get You"	3	—
Doctor Spin	1	"Tetris"	6	—
Arrested Development	1	"People Everyday"	2	—
Erma Franklin	1	"(Take a Little) Piece of My Heart"	9	—
Rage	1	"Run to You"	3	—
Ambassadors of Funk	1	"Super Mario Land"	8	—
Charles & Eddie	1	"Would I Lie to You?"	1	—
WWF Superstars	1	"Slam Jam"	4	—

Notes

Annie Lennox had prior chart success as a member of the duo Eurythmics but 1992 marked the start of her solo career, with "Why" becoming her first top 10 hit at number five.

=== Songs from films ===
Original songs from various films entered the top 10 throughout the year. These included "Addams Groove" (from The Addams Family), God Gave Rock 'N' Roll to You II (Bill & Ted's Bogus Journey), "My Girl" (My Girl), "Everything About You" (Wayne's World), "Beauty and The Beast" (Beauty and The Beast), "This Used To Be My Playground" (A League of Their Own), "The Best Things In Life Are Free" (Mo' Money), "End of the Road" (Boomerang) and "I Will Always Love You" and "Someday (I'm Coming Back)" (The Bodyguard).

=== Charity singles ===
The Comic Relief single for 1992, "(I Want to Be) Elected", was recorded by Rowan Atkinson, in character as his alter-ego Mr. Bean, alongside Bruce Dickinson from the rock band Iron Maiden. It was additionally credited to Smear Campaign which consisted of members of the group Skin (known at the time as Taste). The single peaked at number nine on 11 April 1992 (week ending).

A joint project by Manic Street Preachers and The Fatima Mansions raised money for The Spastics Society. The latter covered Bryan Adams' 1991 sixteen-week chart-topper "(Everything I Do) I Do It for You", with the formerdoing a version of Suicide Is Painless (Theme from M.A.S.H.)". The double A-side single peaked at number seven on 26 September 1992 (week ending).

=== Best-selling singles ===
Whitney Houston had the best-selling single of the year with a cover of "I Will Always Love You", from the soundtrack of the film The Bodyguard. The single spent fifteen weeks in the top 10 (including ten weeks at number-one), sold over 970,000 copies and was certified 2× platinum by the BPI. "Rhythm Is a Dancer" by Snap! came in second place, selling over 675,000 copies and missing out by around 295,000 sales. Charles & Eddie's "Would I Lie to You?", "Stay" from Shakespears Sister and "Please Don't Go"/"Game Boy" by KWS made up the top five. Singles by Boyz II Men, Erasure, Jimmy Nail, Michael Jackson and Wet Wet Wet were also in the top ten best-selling singles of the year.

"I Will Always Love You" (10) also ranked in the top 10 best-selling singles of the decade.

== Top-ten singles ==
Key

Symbol	Meaning
‡	Single peaked in 1991 but still in chart in 1992.
♦	Single released in 1992 but peaked in 1993.
(#)	Year-end top-ten single position and rank
Entered	The date that the single first appeared in the chart.
Peak	Highest position that the single reached in the UK Singles Chart.

Entered (week ending)	Weeks in top 10	Single	Artist	Peak	Peak reached (week ending)	Weeks at peak
Singles in 1991
30 November 1991	7	"When You Tell Me That You Love Me" ‡	Diana Ross	2	14 December 1991	2
7 December 1991	6	"Don't Let the Sun Go Down on Me" ‡	George Michael & Elton John	1	7 December 1991	2
7 December 1991	8	"Justified & Ancient"	The KLF featuring Tammy Wynette	2	4 January 1992	2
14 December 1991	4	"Driven by You" ‡	Brian May	6	14 December 1991	2
14 December 1991	7	"Too Blind to See It"	Kym Sims	5	11 January 1992	2
21 December 1991	8	"Bohemian Rhapsody"/"These Are the Days of Our Lives" ‡ (#2)	Queen	1	21 December 1991	5
21 December 1991	3	"Live and Let Die" ‡	Guns N' Roses	5	21 December 1991	1
21 December 1991	5	"Don't Talk Just Kiss"	Right Said Fred	3	11 January 1992	1
28 December 1991	4	"Addams Groove"	MC Hammer	4	11 January 1992	1
28 December 1991	3	"Roobarb and Custard"	Shaft	7	11 January 1992	1
Singles in 1992
11 January 1992	8	"Goodnight Girl" (#10)	Wet Wet Wet	1	25 January 1992	4
11 January 1992	4	"Everybody in the Place"	The Prodigy	2	18 January 1992	1
18 January 1992	2	"We Got a Love Thang"	CeCe Peniston	6	25 January 1992	1
18 January 1992	4	"God Gave Rock 'n' Roll to You II"	Kiss	4	25 January 1992	1
18 January 1992	4	"I Can't Dance"	Genesis	7	25 January 1992	1
25 January 1992	4	"Give Me Just a Little More Time"	Kylie Minogue	2	1 February 1992	1
25 January 1992	5	"Twilight Zone"	2 Unlimited	2	8 February 1992	1
1 February 1992	4	"I Wonder Why"	Curtis Stigers	5	8 February 1992	2
1 February 1992	1	"Welcome to the Cheap Seats"	The Wonder Stuff	8	1 February 1992	1
1 February 1992	13	"Stay" (#4)	Shakespears Sister	1	22 February 1992	8
8 February 1992	5	"I'm Doing Fine Now"	The Pasadenas	4	8 February 1992	4
8 February 1992	2	"The Bouncer"	Kicks Like a Mule	7	8 February 1992	1
15 February 1992	4	"Remember the Time"	Michael Jackson	3	22 February 1992	1
15 February 1992	1	"Leave Them All Behind"	Ride	9	15 February 1992	1
15 February 1992	1	"Reverence"	The Jesus and Mary Chain	10	15 February 1992	1
22 February 1992	5	"My Girl" ^{[B]}	The Temptations	2	29 February 1992	2
22 February 1992	7	"I Love Your Smile" ^{[C]}	Shanice	2	14 March 1992	2
22 February 1992	2	"For Your Babies"	Simply Red	9	22 February 1992	2
22 February 1992	5	"It's a Fine Day"	Opus III	5	29 February 1992	2
29 February 1992	2	"Thought I'd Died and Gone to Heaven"	Bryan Adams	8	29 February 1992	2
29 February 1992	3	"It Must Be Love" ^{[D]}	Madness	6	7 March 1992	1
7 March 1992	2	"November Rain"	Guns N' Roses	4	7 March 1992	1
7 March 1992	3	"America: What Time Is Love?"	The KLF	4	14 March 1992	2
14 March 1992	2	"One"	U2	7	14 March 1992	1
14 March 1992	3	"Weather with You"	Crowded House	7	21 March 1992	1
14 March 1992	1	"Come as You Are"	Nirvana	9	14 March 1992	1
21 March 1992	3	"Tears in Heaven"	Eric Clapton	5	21 March 1992	2
21 March 1992	5	"Finally" ^{[E]}	CeCe Peniston	2	28 March 1992	1
21 March 1992	6	"To Be with You"	Mr. Big	3	28 March 1992	3
28 March 1992	8	"Deeply Dippy"	Right Said Fred	1	18 April 1992	3
28 March 1992	3	"Let's Get Rocked"	Def Leppard	2	4 April 1992	1
28 March 1992	1	"High"	The Cure	8	28 March 1992	1
28 March 1992	3	"Why"	Annie Lennox	5	11 April 1992	1
4 April 1992	1	"Breath of Life"	Erasure	8	4 April 1992	1
4 April 1992	3	"Joy"	Soul II Soul	4	11 April 1992	1
11 April 1992	4	"Save the Best for Last"	Vanessa Williams	3	18 April 1992	1
11 April 1992	1	"(I Want to Be) Elected" ^{[F]}	Mr. Bean & Smear Campaign featuring Bruce Dickinson ^{[G]}	9	11 April 1992	1
11 April 1992	2	"Evapor-8"	Altern-8	6	18 April 1992	1
18 April 1992	8	"On a Ragga Tip"	SL2	2	2 May 1992	3
18 April 1992	5	"You're All That Matters to Me"	Curtis Stigers	6	2 May 1992	1
18 April 1992	1	"Viva Las Vegas"	ZZ Top	10	18 April 1992	1
25 April 1992	1	"Be Quick or Be Dead"	Iron Maiden	2	25 April 1992	1
25 April 1992	2	"The Only Living Boy in New Cross"	Carter the Unstoppable Sex Machine	7	2 May 1992	1
25 April 1992	4	"The Days of Pearly Spencer"	Marc Almond	4	2 May 1992	2
25 April 1992	3	"You"	Ten Sharp	10	25 April 1992	3
2 May 1992	2	"Temple of Love (1992)"	The Sisters of Mercy	3	2 May 1992	1
2 May 1992	2	"In the Closet"	Michael Jackson	8	2 May 1992	1
2 May 1992	10	"Please Don't Go"/"Game Boy" (#5)	KWS	1	9 May 1992	5
9 May 1992	2	"Nothing Else Matters"	Metallica	6	9 May 1992	1
9 May 1992	3	"Hang On in There Baby"	Curiosity	3	16 May 1992	1
16 May 1992	2	"Workaholic"	2 Unlimited	4	16 May 1992	1
16 May 1992	4	"My Lovin' (You're Never Gonna Get It)"	En Vogue	4	23 May 1992	1
16 May 1992	1	"Come Play with Me"	The Wedding Present	10	16 May 1992	1
23 May 1992	4	"Knockin' on Heaven's Door"	Guns N' Roses	2	23 May 1992	1
23 May 1992	5	"Everything About You"	Ugly Kid Joe	3	6 June 1992	1
23 May 1992	2	"I Don't Care"	Shakespears Sister	7	23 May 1992	1
23 May 1992	1	"Beauty and the Beast"	Celine Dion & Peabo Bryson	9	23 May 1992	1
23 May 1992	1	"Keep On Walkin'"	CeCe Peniston	10	23 May 1992	1
30 May 1992	1	"Raving I'm Raving" ^{[H]}	Shut Up and Dance	2	30 May 1992	1
30 May 1992	5	"Jump"	Kris Kross	2	6 June 1992	1
30 May 1992	2	"Friday I'm in Love"	The Cure	6	6 June 1992	1
30 May 1992	8	"Hazard"	Richard Marx	3	27 June 1992	3
6 June 1992	6	"Something Good"	Utah Saints	4	27 June 1992	1
6 June 1992	1	"Midlife Crisis"	Faith No More	10	6 June 1992	1
13 June 1992	7	"Abba-esque (EP)" (#7)	Erasure	1	13 June 1992	5
13 June 1992	4	"Too Funky"	George Michael	4	13 June 1992	1
13 June 1992	5	"Heartbeat" ^{[I]}	Nick Berry	2	20 June 1992	2
13 June 1992	4	"It Only Takes a Minute"	Take That	7	27 June 1992	1
20 June 1992	2	"The One"	Elton John	10	20 June 1992	2
27 June 1992	1	"Blue Room" ^{[J]}	The Orb	8	27 June 1992	1
4 July 1992	3	"I'll Be There"	Mariah Carey	2	4 July 1992	2
4 July 1992	2	"Disappointed"	Electronic	6	4 July 1992	1
4 July 1992	2	"One Shining Moment"	Diana Ross	10	4 July 1992	2
11 July 1992	5	"Sesame's Treet" ^{[K]}	Smart E's	2	18 July 1992	1
11 July 1992	8	"Ain't No Doubt" (#8)	Jimmy Nail	1	18 July 1992	3
11 July 1992	13	"Rhythm Is a Dancer" (#2)	Snap!	1	8 August 1992	6
18 July 1992	3	"A Trip to Trumpton" ^{[L]}	Urban Hype	6	18 July 1992	2
18 July 1992	3	"Sexy MF"/"Strollin'"	Prince & The New Power Generation	4	25 July 1992	1
18 July 1992	1	"Even Better Than the Real Thing (Remix)" ^{[M]}^{[N]}	U2	8	18 July 1992	1
18 July 1992	4	"LSI (Love Sex Intelligence)"	The Shamen	6	1 August 1992	1
25 July 1992	4	"This Used to Be My Playground"	Madonna	3	1 August 1992	2
25 July 1992	3	"I Drove All Night"	Roy Orbison	7	1 August 1992	1
25 July 1992	5	"Shake Your Head"	Was (Not Was)	4	8 August 1992	1
1 August 1992	1	"Who Is It"	Michael Jackson	10	1 August 1992	1
8 August 1992	4	"Barcelona" ^{[O]}	Freddie Mercury & Montserrat Caballé	2	15 August 1992	2
8 August 1992	6	"Achy Breaky Heart"	Billy Ray Cyrus	3	22 August 1992	2
8 August 1992	1	"Book of Days"	Enya	10	8 August 1992	1
15 August 1992	7	"The Best Things in Life Are Free"	Luther Vandross & Janet Jackson featuring BBD & Ralph Tresvant	2	29 August 1992	2
15 August 1992	7	"Just Another Day"	Jon Secada	5	22 August 1992	3
15 August 1992	5	"Don't You Want Me"	Felix	6	22 August 1992	2
15 August 1992	2	"This Charming Man" ^{[P]}	The Smiths	8	22 August 1992	1
22 August 1992	9	"Baker Street"	Undercover	2	19 September 1992	1
29 August 1992	2	"Rock Your Baby"	KWS	8	29 August 1992	1
29 August 1992	3	"Walking on Broken Glass"	Annie Lennox	8	5 September 1992	1
5 September 1992	8	"Ebeneezer Goode"	The Shamen	1	19 September 1992	4
5 September 1992	5	"Too Much Love Will Kill You"	Brian May	5	19 September 1992	2
12 September 1992	7	"It's My Life"	Dr. Alban	2	26 September 1992	3
19 September 1992	4	"My Destiny"	Lionel Richie	7	3 October 1992	1
19 September 1992	3	"Theme from M.A.S.H. (Suicide Is Painless)"/"(Everything I Do) I Do It for You"	Manic Street Preachers/The Fatima Mansions ^{[Q]}	7	26 September 1992	1
19 September 1992	1	"House of Love"	East 17	10	19 September 1992	1
26 September 1992	3	"Iron Lion Zion"	Bob Marley and the Wailers	5	3 October 1992	1
3 October 1992	6	"Sleeping Satellite"	Tasmin Archer	1	17 October 1992	2
3 October 1992	10	"End of the Road" (#6)	Boyz II Men	1	31 October 1992	3
10 October 1992	6	"I'm Gonna Get You"	Bizarre Inc featuring Angie Brown	3	24 October 1992	1
10 October 1992	2	"My Name Is Prince"	Prince & The New Power Generation	7	17 October 1992	1
10 October 1992	1	"Sentinel"	Mike Oldfield	10	10 October 1992	1
17 October 1992	1	"Love Song"/"Alive and Kicking" ^{[R]}	Simple Minds	6	17 October 1992	1
17 October 1992	3	"Tetris"	Doctor Spin	6	24 October 1992	1
17 October 1992	4	"A Million Love Songs"	Take That	7	31 October 1992	1
24 October 1992	3	"Erotica"	Madonna	3	31 October 1992	1
24 October 1992	2	"Keep the Faith"	Bon Jovi	5	24 October 1992	2
24 October 1992	7	"People Everyday"	Arrested Development	2	7 November 1992	1
31 October 1992	1	"(Take a Little) Piece of My Heart" ^{[S]}	Erma Franklin	9	31 October 1992	1
31 October 1992	4	"Run to You"	Rage	3	7 November 1992	1
7 November 1992	4	"Boss Drum"	The Shamen	4	14 November 1992	1
7 November 1992	2	"Supermarioland"	Ambassadors of Funk featuring MC Mario	8	14 November 1992	1
7 November 1992	2	"Who Needs Love Like That (Hamburg Mix)" ^{[T]}	Erasure	10	7 November 1992	2
14 November 1992	10	"Would I Lie to You?" (#3)	Charles & Eddie	1	21 November 1992	2
14 November 1992	2	"Be My Baby"	Vanessa Paradis	6	14 November 1992	1
14 November 1992	4	"Never Let Her Slip Away"	Undercover	5	21 November 1992	2
21 November 1992	15	"I Will Always Love You" (#1)	Whitney Houston	1	5 December 1992	10
21 November 1992	2	"Invisible Touch (Live)"	Genesis	7	21 November 1992	1
21 November 1992	4	"Temptation (Brothers in Rhythm Remix)" ^{[U]}	Heaven 17	4	28 November 1992	2
28 November 1992	3	"Out of Space"/"Ruff in the Jungle Bizness"	The Prodigy	5	5 December 1992	1
28 November 1992	1	"Yesterdays"	Guns N' Roses	8	28 November 1992	1
5 December 1992	7	"Heal the World" (#9)	Michael Jackson	2	12 December 1992	5
5 December 1992	5	"Tom Traubert's Blues (Waltzing Matilda)"	Rod Stewart	6	12 December 1992	1
5 December 1992	2	"I Still Believe in You"	Cliff Richard	7	12 December 1992	1
12 December 1992	5	"Slam Jam"	WWF Superstars	4	12 December 1992	2
12 December 1992	8	"Could It Be Magic" ♦	Take That	3	9 January 1993	2
12 December 1992	3	"Deeper and Deeper"	Madonna	6	19 December 1992	1
19 December 1992	5	"Phorever People"	The Shamen	5	26 December 1992	2
19 December 1992	1	"In My Defence"	Freddie Mercury	8	19 December 1992	1
19 December 1992	3	"Boney M. Megamix 1992"	Boney M.	7	26 December 1992	1
26 December 1992	3	"Miami Hit Mix"	Gloria Estefan	8	26 December 1992	2

== Entries by artist ==
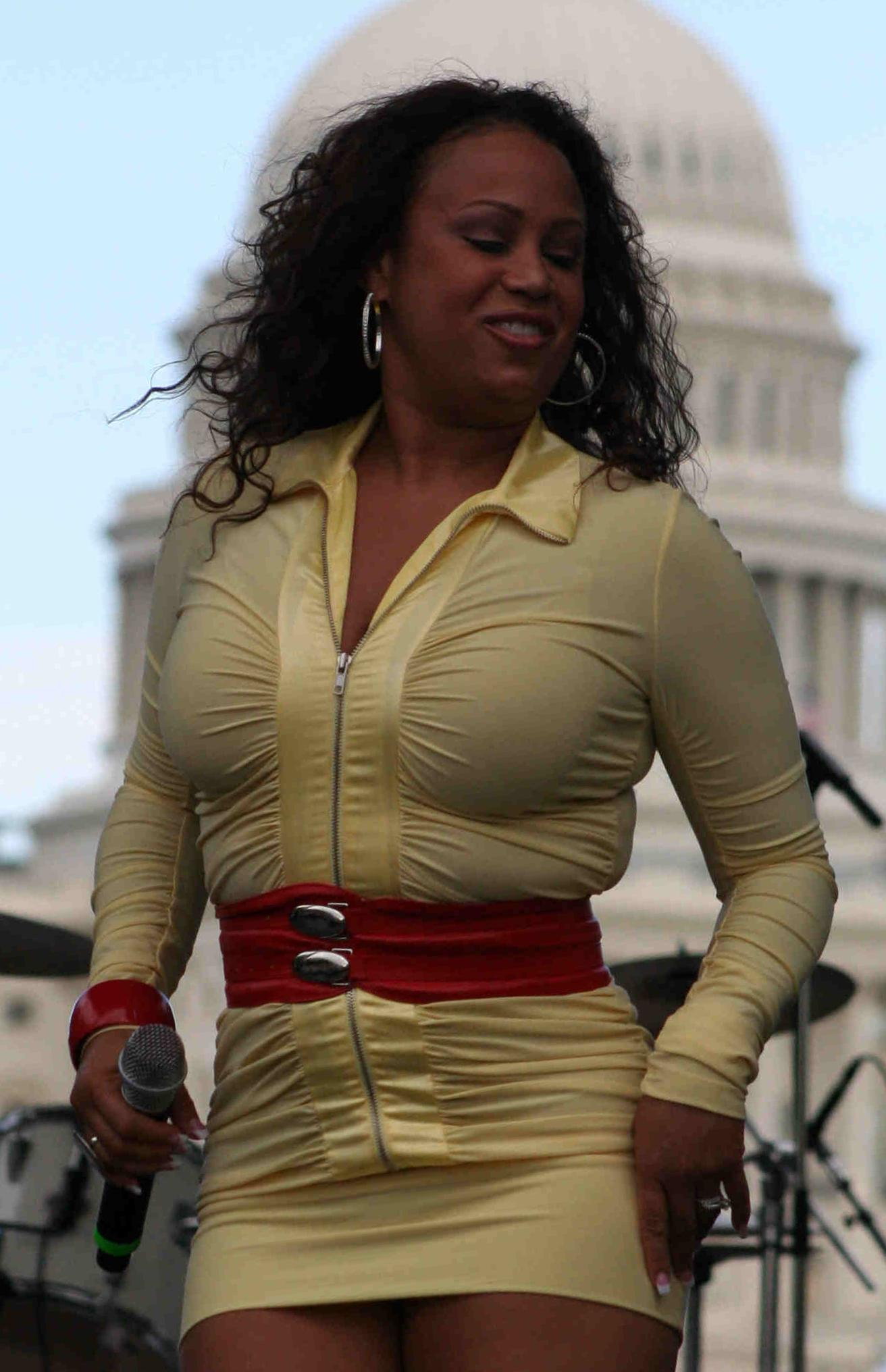
CeCe Peniston achieved three UK top 10 entries in 1992, including the number two single "Finally".

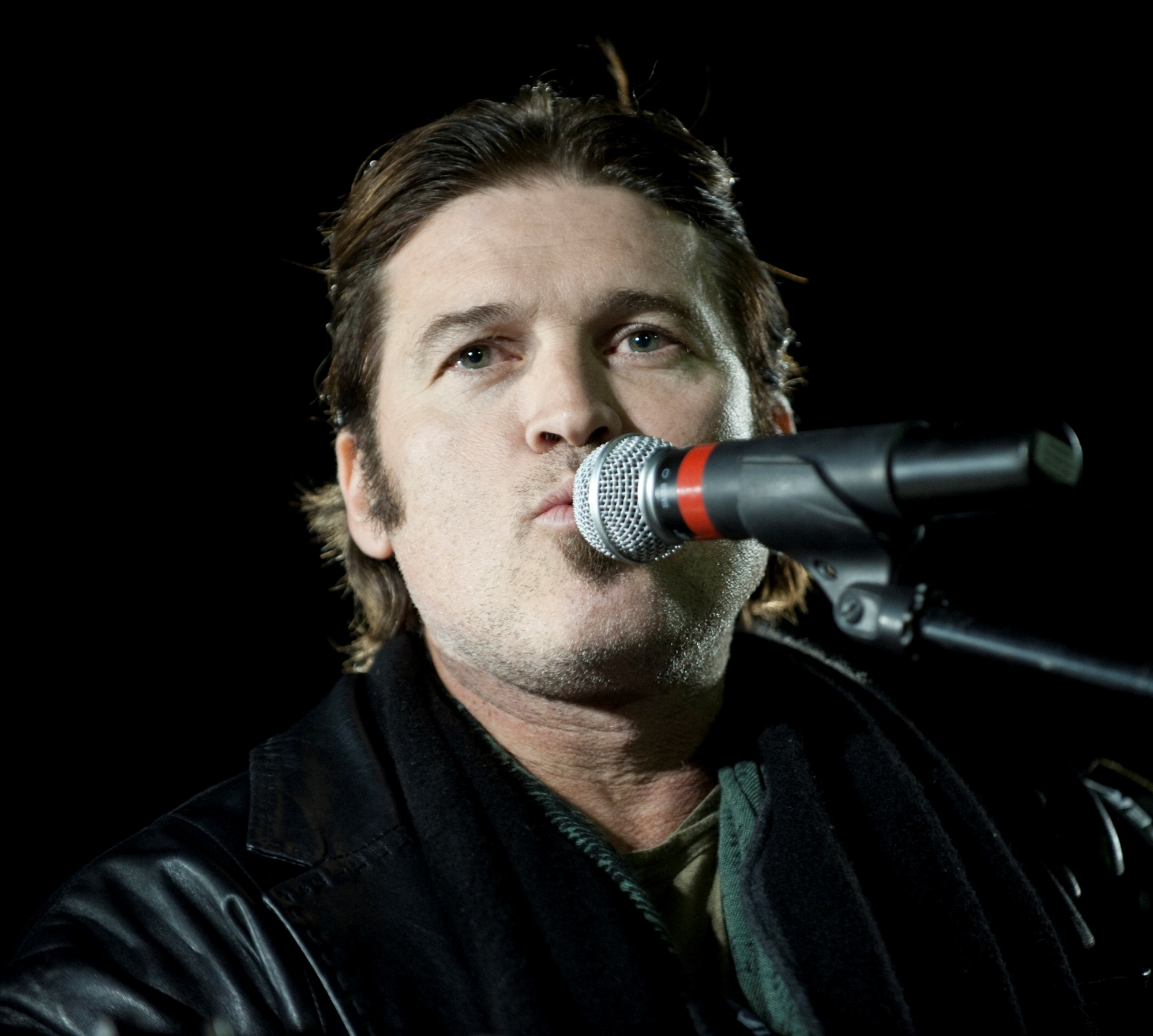
Billy Ray Cyrus reached number three in August with "Achy Breaky Heart", which spent six weeks in the UK top 10.

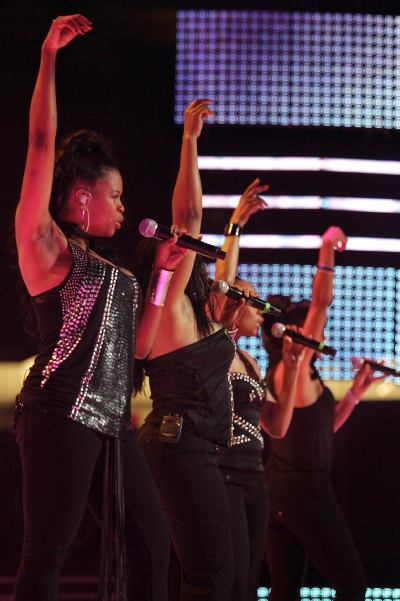
En Vogue charted at number four in May 1992 with "My Lovin' (You're Never Gonna Get It)".

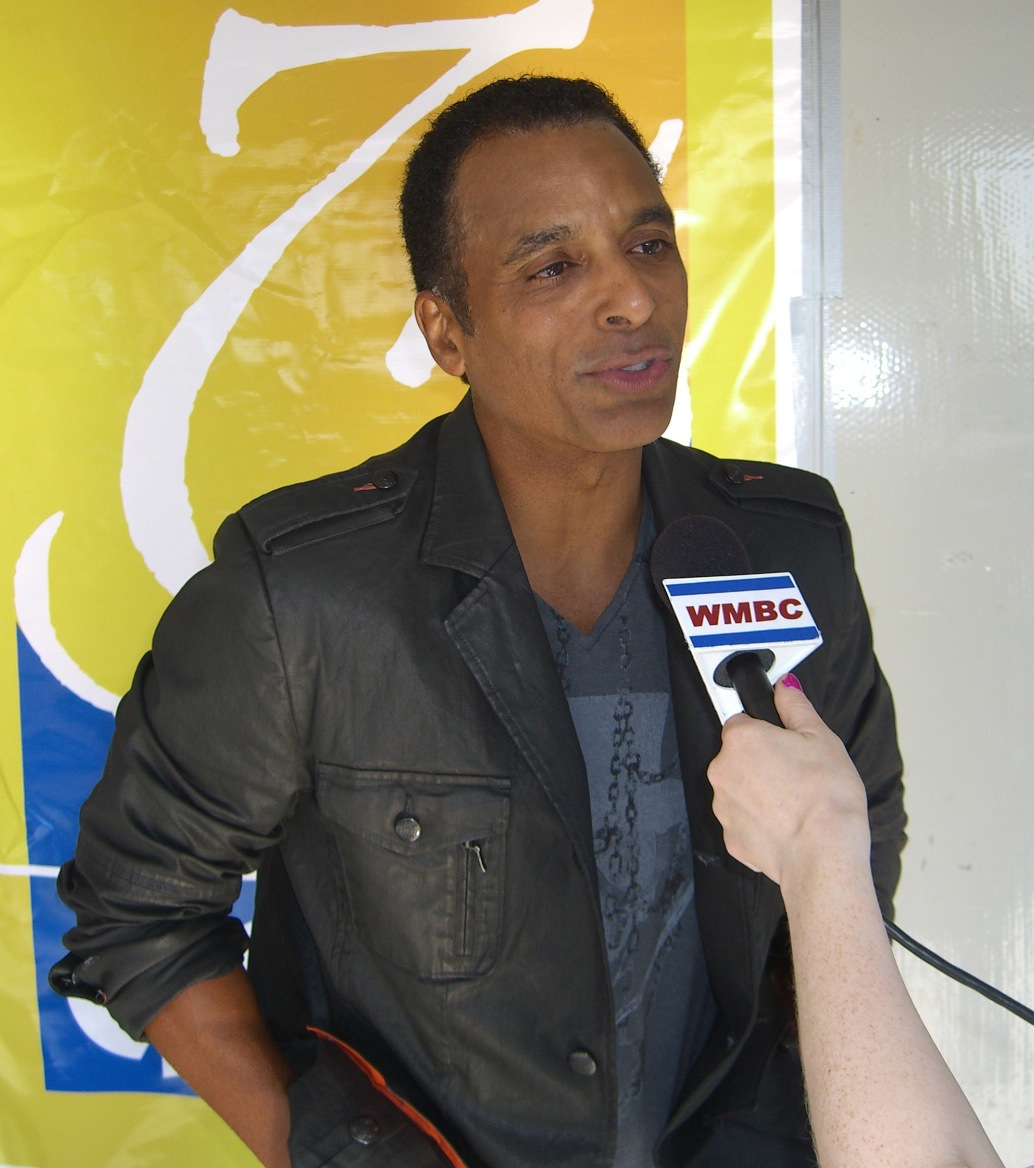
Jon Secada reached number five in August with "Just Another Day".

The following table shows artists who achieved two or more top 10 entries in 1992, including singles that reached their peak in 1991 or 1993 . The figures include both main artists and featured artists, while appearances on ensemble charity records are also counted for each artist.

Entries	Artist	Weeks	Singles
4	Michael Jackson	11	"Heal the World", "In the Closet", "Remember the Time", "Who Is It"
4	The Shamen	18	"Boss Drum", "Ebeneezer Goode", "LSI (Love Sex Intelligence)", "Phorever People"
3	CeCe Peniston	8	"Finally", "Keep On Walkin'", "We Got a Love Thang"
3	Erasure	10	"Abba-esque (EP)", "Breath of Life", "Who Needs Love Like That"
3	Freddie Mercury ^{[V]}^{[W]}	11	"Barcelona", "Bohemian Rhapsody"/"These Are the Days of Our Lives", "In My Defence"
3	Guns N' Roses ^{[W]}	8	"Knockin' on Heaven's Door", "Live and Let Die", "November Rain", "Yesterdays"
3	Madonna	10	"Deeper and Deeper", "Erotica", "This Used to Be My Playground"
3	Take That ^{[X]}	11	"A Million Love Songs", "Could It Be Magic", "It Only Takes a Minute"
2	2 Unlimited	7	"Twilight Zone", "Workaholic"
2	Annie Lennox	6	"Walking on Broken Glass", "Why"
2	Brian May ^{[V]}^{[W]}	12	"Bohemian Rhapsody"/"These Are the Days of Our Lives", "Driven by You", "Too Much Love Will Kill You"
2	Bruce Dickinson ^{[Y]}^{[Z]}	2	"Be Quick or Be Dead", "(I Want to Be) Elected"
2	The Cure	3	"Friday I'm in Love", "High"
2	Curtis Stigers	9	"I Wonder Why", "You're All That Matters to Me"
2	Diana Ross ^{[W]}	4	"One Shining Moment", "When You Tell Me That You Love Me"
2	Elton John ^{[W]}	4	"Don't Let the Sun Go Down on Me", "The One"
2	Genesis	6	"I Can't Dance", "Invisible Touch (Live)"
2	George Michael ^{[W]}	6	"Don't Let the Sun Go Down on Me", "Too Funky"
2	The KLF ^{[AA]}	7	"America: What Time is Love?", "Justified & Ancient"
2	KWS	12	"Please Don't Go"/"Game Boy", "Rock Your Baby"
2	The New Power Generation	5	"My Name Is Prince", "Sexy MF"/"Strollin'"
2	Prince	5	"My Name Is Prince", "Sexy MF"/"Strollin'"
2	The Prodigy	7	"Everybody in the Place", "Out of Space"/"Ruff in the Jungle Bizness"
2	Right Said Fred ^{[AA]}	11	"Deeply Dippy", "Don't Talk Just Kiss"
2	Shakespears Sister	15	"I Don't Care", "Stay"
2	U2	3	"Even Better Than the Real Thing (Remix)", "One"
2	Undercover	13	"Baker Street", "Never Let Her Slip Away"

== Notes ==
- ^{a} "Could It Be Magic" reached its peak of number three on 9 January 1993 (week ending).
- ^{b} "My Girl" originally peaked outside the top ten at number 43 upon its initial release in 1965. It re-entered at number 92 in 1986. It was re-released as a single in 1992, following the November 1991 release of the film of the same name, which featured the song. As a result, it made the UK top ten for the first time, peaking at number two.
- ^{c} "I Love Your Smile" originally peaked outside the top ten at number 55 upon its initial release in November 1991.
- ^{d} "It Must Be Love" originally peaked at number 4 upon its initial release in 1981. It was re-released as a single in 1992 to coincide with the release of the greatest hits album Divine Madness.
- ^{e} "Finally" originally peaked outside the top ten at number 29 upon its initial release in October 1991.
- ^{f} Released as the official single for Comic Relief.
- ^{g} "(I Want to Be) Elected" was performed by Rowan Atkinson (in character as Mr. Bean) and Bruce Dickinson of Iron Maiden, with Smear Campaign made up of members of the group Skin (at that point known as Taste).
- ^{h} "Raving I'm Raving" incorporated an unauthorised sample of the song "Walking in Memphis" and was subsequently banned from the charts.
- ^{i} Nick Berry's cover of "Heartbeat" was used as the theme tune for the television series of the same name.
- ^{j} "Blue Room" is the longest song ever to chart in the UK with a running time of 39:57. Earlier in the year, the Official Charts Company had extended the maximum song length for chart eligibility from 25 minutes to 40 minutes.
- ^{k} "Sesame's Treet" is a remix of the theme song to the television series Sesame Street.
- ^{l} "A Trip to Trumpton" includes samples from the 1960s television series of the same name.
- ^{m} The original release of "Even Better Than the Real Thing" only charted at number 12 but the remix reached the top 10.
- ^{n} "Even Better Than the Real Thing" was remixed by Paul Oakenfold.
- ^{o} "Barcelona" originally peaked at number 8 upon its initial release in 1987.
- ^{p} "This Charming Man" originally peaked at number 25 upon its initial release in 1983.
- ^{q} Manic Street Preachers and The Fatima Mansions covered "Theme from M.A.S.H." and "Everything I Do (I Do It For You)" respectively. It was released as a double A-side single to raise money for The Spastics Society.
- ^{r} "Love Song" originally peaked at number 47 upon its initial release in 1981. "Alive and Kicking" originally peaked at number 7 upon its initial release in 1985. The two songs were re-issued together as a double A-sided single in 1992 to promote the compilation album Glittering Prize 81/92.
- ^{s} "(Take a Little) Piece of My Heart" was first released in 1967. It was reissued after being used in a Levi's advertising campaign in 1992.
- ^{t} "Who Needs Love (Like That)" originally peaked outside the top 10 at number 55 upon its initial release in 1985.
- ^{u} The original version of "Temptation" peaked at number 2 upon its release in 1983.
- ^{v} Figure includes a top 10 hit with the group Queen.
- ^{w} Figure includes single that peaked in 1991.
- ^{x} Figure includes single that peaked in 1993.
- ^{y} Figure includes a top 10 hit with the group Iron Maiden.
- ^{z} Figure includes an appearance on the Comic Relief single "(I Want to Be) Elected".
- ^{aa} Figure includes single that first charted in 1991 but peaked in 1992.

== See also ==
- 1992 in British music
- List of number-one singles from the 1990s (UK)
