= Shaft (rave group) =

English electronic music group

Shaft was an English electronic music group, scoring a top 10 hit on the UK Singles Chart in December 1991 with "Roobarb & Custard". It featured recreated vocal samples from the vintage children's television cartoon Roobarb, as well as a variety of sound effects. The main contributors were the British record producers Mark Pritchard and Adrian Hughes.

Although the single reached the top 10 in 1991, it climbed to its highest position of No. 7 in January 1992. The follow-up track was "Monkey", which peaked at No. 61 in July 1992.

The use of samples from children's television programmes was not unique to this hit within the genre, with Mark Summers having sampled The Magic Roundabout in his January 1991 hit "Summers Magic" followed in August of that year by the Prodigy's first chart hit "Charly". Other groups who went on later in 1992 to repeat this success were Urban Hype, who reached No. 7 with "A Trip to Trumpton", and Smart E's, who achieved a No. 2 hit with "Sesame's Treet". The string of similarly created records were dubbed toytown techno.
