= Toytown techno =

Subgenre of techno music

- Stylistic origins: Techno; jungle; breakbeat hardcore; novelty songs; sampling
- Cultural origins: Early 1990s

Toytown techno (also known as kiddy rave or cartoon rave) is an underground subgenre of techno that emerged in the early 1990s, characterized by merging techno, jungle, or breakbeat hardcore with samples from children's television series or public information films.

Popular songs within the subgenre include Alpha Team's "Speed", Mark Summers' "Summers Magic", Smart E's "Sesame's Treet", the Prodigy's "Charly", Shaft's "Roobarb and Custard", and Urban Hype's "A Trip to Trumpton", which featured samples from Speed Racer, The Magic Roundabout, Sesame Street, Charley Says, Roobarb, and Trumpton, respectively.
