= List of UK top-ten singles in 1991 =

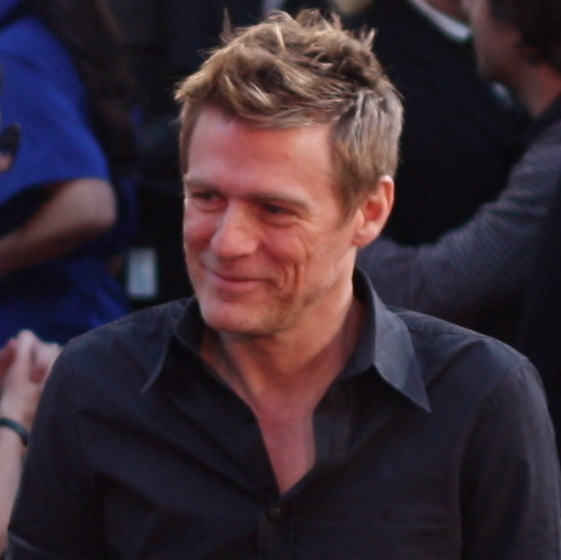
Bryan Adams not only achieved the biggest-selling single of 1991 with "(Everything I Do) I Do It for You", but also spent a record sixteen consecutive weeks at number-one with the song.

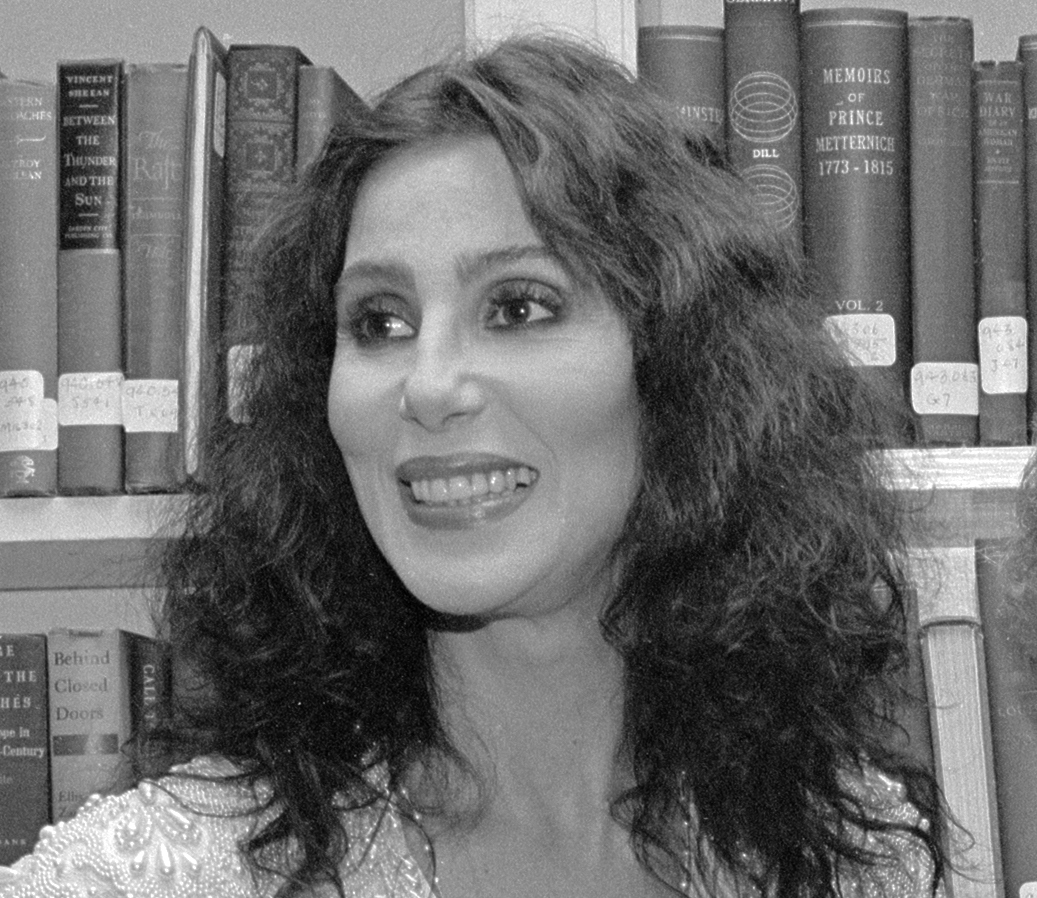
Cher had the third best selling single of the year, "The Shoop Shoop Song (It's in His Kiss)", which featured in the film Mermaids, which spent five weeks at number-one. She also reached number ten in July with "Love and Understanding".

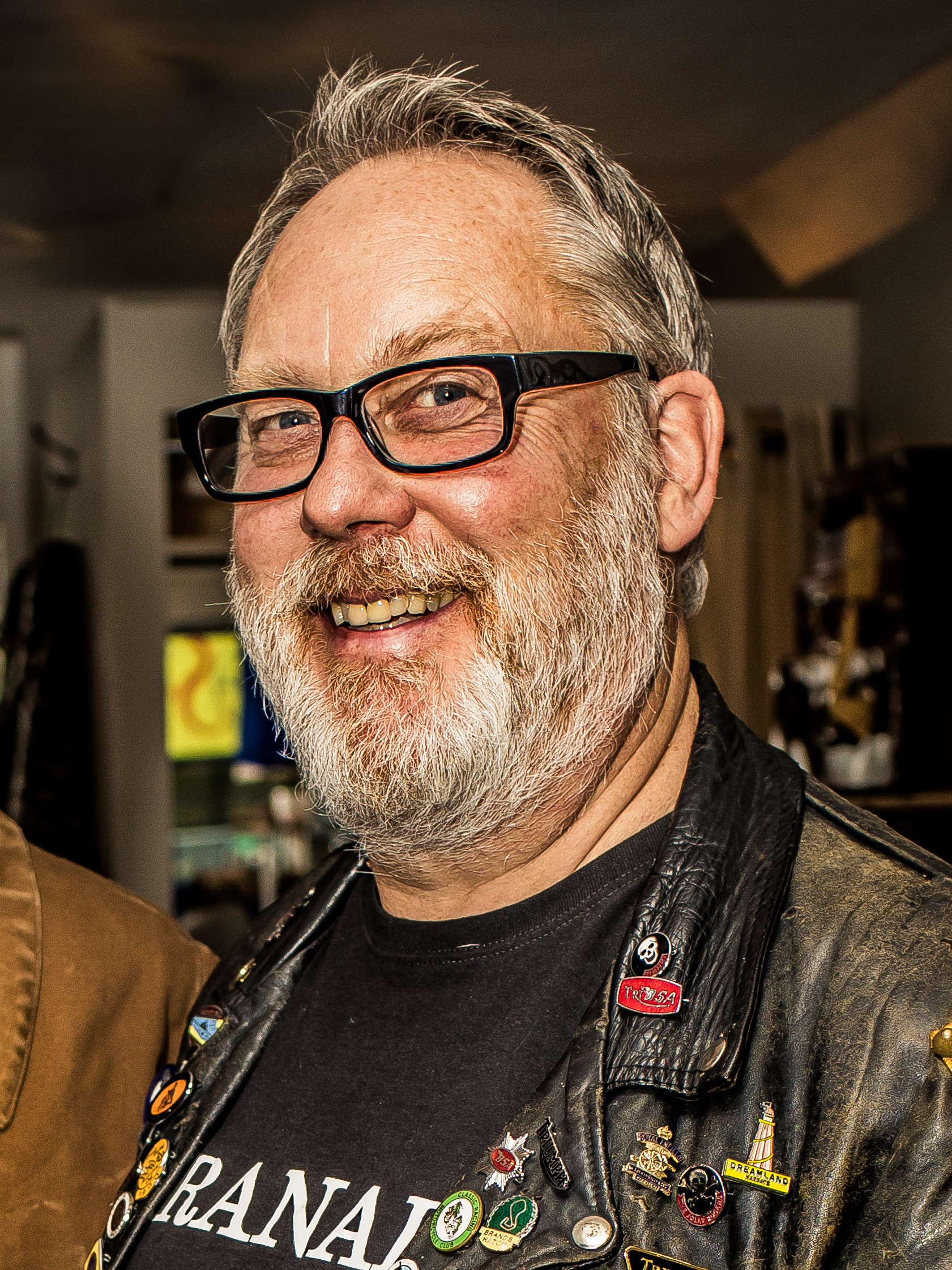
Vic Reeves (real name Jim Moir) (pictured in 2019) had two top 10 entries in 1991, including his cover version of "Dizzy", a collaboration with The Wonder Stuff, which spent two weeks at number-one in November.

The UK Singles Chart is one of many music charts compiled by the Official Charts Company that calculates the best-selling singles of the week in the United Kingdom. Before 2004, the chart was only based on the sales of physical singles. This list shows singles that peaked in the Top 10 of the UK Singles Chart during 1991, as well as singles which peaked in 1990 and 1992 but were in the top 10 in 1991. The entry date is when the single appeared in the top 10 for the first time (week ending, as published by the Official Charts Company, which is six days after the chart is announced).

One-hundred and forty-six singles were in the top ten in 1991. Nine singles from 1990 remained in the top 10 for several weeks at the beginning of the year, while "Addams Groove" by MC Hammer, "Don't Talk Just Kiss" by Right Said Fred, "Justified & Ancient" by The KLF featuring Tammy Wynette, "Roobarb and Custard" by Shaft and "Too Blind to See It" by Kym Sims were all released in 1991 but did not reach their peak until 1992. "Pray by MC Hammer, "Sadeness (Part I)" by Enigma and "The Grease Megamix" by John Travolta and Olivia Newton-John" were the singles from 1990 to reach their peak in 1991. Twenty-eight artists scored multiple entries in the top 10 in 1991. 2 Unlimited, Blur, Bryan Adams, Nirvana and The Prodigy were among the many artists who achieved their first UK charting top 10 single in 1991.

"Everything I Do (I Do It for You)" broke a record for number of weeks at number-one that had stood since the 1950s, and still remains a record as of 2018. The Bryan Adams song was featured on the soundtrack to the film Robin Hood: Prince of Thieves and was at the top of the charts from 7 July until it was knocked off by U2's "The Fly" on 27 October. The single sold over 1.5 million copies, spent sixteen weeks at number-one and five more weeks in the top ten.

The first number-one single of the year was "Bring Your Daughter... to the Slaughter" by Iron Maiden. Overall, seventeen different singles peaked at number-one in 1991, with Brian May and Roger Taylor (3, including singles with Queen and Hale and Pace) having the most singles hit that position.

== Background ==
=== Multiple entries ===
One-hundred and forty-six singles charted in the top 10 in 1991, with one-hundred and thirty-five singles reaching their peak this year.

Twenty-eight artists scored multiple entries in the top 10 in 1991. British acid house duo The KLF, Brian May from Queen and American singer Madonna shared the record for most top ten singles in 1991 with four hit singles each. "3 a.m. Eternal" peaked at number-one for two weeks, and "Justified & Ancient" and "Last Train to Trancentral" both reached number 2. They also reached number 10 in November with "It's Grim Up North" under the moniker of The Justified Ancients of Mu Mu.

Madonna's haul included 1990's number two single "Justify My Love" and "Crazy for You", which reached the same position. "Rescue Me" peaked one place lower, while "Holiday" rounded off her year with a number 5 placing in June.

Two of Brian May's chart hits came with his group – the Christmas number-one double-A side "Bohemian Rhapsody"/"These Are the Days of Our Lives" and fellow chart-topper "Innuendo". He also had a solo top 10 entry, with "Driven by You" making number 6 in December. He was also involved in the Comic Relief charity single "The Stonk" which was credited to the fictional group The Stonkers.

Rock band Guns N' Roses, Australian singer and actress Kylie Minogue and Roger Taylor of the group Queen all had three singles in the top 10. The former's biggest hit of the year, "You Could Be Mine", charted at number 3; their cover of "Live and Let Die" made the top 5, and "Don't Cry" reached number 8. Kylie Minogue had a similar level of success, with "If You Were with Me Now" reaching number 4 in November, and "Shocked" and "What Do I Have to Do" charting at number 6. Roger Taylor was involved on the same two Queen tracks as May, as well as the number-one charity single "The Stonk", all topping the chart.

Cher was one of a number of artists with two top-ten entries, including the number-one single "The Shoop Shoop Song (It's In His Kiss)". Dannii Minogue, James, MC Hammer, Snap! and The Wonder Stuff were among the other artists who had multiple top 10 entries in 1991.

=== Chart debuts ===
Seventy-eight artists achieved their first top 10 single in 1991, either as a lead or featured artist. Of these, eleven went on to record another hit single that year: Seal, C+C Music Factory, Color Me Badd, Dannii Minogue, Freedom Williams, James, Right Said Fred, Salt-N-Pepa, The Simpsons, Vic Reeves and The Wonder Stuff,

The following table (collapsed on desktop site) does not include acts who had previously charted as part of a group and secured their first top 10 solo single.

Artist	Number of top 10s	First entry	Chart position	Other entries
Seal	2	"Crazy"	1	"Killer" (8)
C+C Music Factory	2	"Gonna Make You Sweat (Everybody Dance Now)"	3	"Things That Make You Go Hmmm..." (4)
Freedom Williams	2	"Gonna Make You Sweat (Everybody Dance Now)"	3	"Things That Make You Go Hmmm..." (4)
Jesus Jones	1	"International Bright Young Thing"	7	—
2 in a Room	1	"Wiggle It"	3	—
Off-Shore	1	"I Can't Take the Power"	7	—
The Simpsons	2	"Do the Bartman"	1	"Deep, Deep Trouble" (7)
Soho	1	"Hippy Chick"	8	—
Nomad	1	"(I Wanna Give You) Devotion"	2	—
MC Mikee Freedom	1	"(I Wanna Give You) Devotion"	2	—
Praise	1	"Only You"	4	—
Oleta Adams	1	"Get Here"	4	—
The Source	1	"You Got the Love"	4	—
Candi Staton	1	"You Got the Love"	4	—
The Clash	1	"Should I Stay or Should I Go"	1	—
Xpansions	1	"Move Your Body (Elevation)"	7	—
Stevie B	1	"Because I Love You (The Postman song)"	6	—
Hale and Pace	1	"The Stonk"	1	—
The Stonkers	1	"The Stonk"	1	—
Quartz	1	"It's Too Late"	8	—
Dina Carroll	1	"It's Too Late"	8	—
Chesney Hawkes	1	"The One and Only"	1	—
James	2	"Sit Down"	2	"Sound" (9)
The Waterboys	1	"The Whole of the Moon"	3	—
The Wonder Stuff	2	"The Size of a Cow"	5	"Dizzy" (1)
N-Joi	1	"Anthem"	8	—
Dannii Minogue	2	"Love and Kisses"	8	"Jump to the Beat" (8)
Zucchero	1	"Senza una donna (Without a Woman)"	4	—
Gary Clail On-U Sound System	1	"Human Nature"	10	—
Vic Reeves	2	"Born Free"	6	"Dizzy" (1)
The Roman Numerals	1	"Born Free"	6	—
Electronic	1	"Get the Message"	8	—
Blur	1	"There's No Other Way"	8	—
Crystal Waters	1	"Gypsy Woman"	2	—
Beverley Craven	1	"Promise Me"	3	—
Color Me Badd	2	"I Wanna Sex You Up"	1	"All 4 Love" (5)
Amy Grant	1	"Baby Baby"	2	—
R.E.M	1	"Shiny Happy People"	6	—
The Doors	1	"Light My Fire"	7	—
Kenny Thomas	1	"Thinking About Your Love"	4	—
Salt-N-Pepa	2	"Do You Want Me"	5	"Let's Talk About Sex" (2)
Bryan Adams	1	"Everything I Do (I Do It for You)"	1	—
Incognito	1	"Always There"	6	—
Jocelyn Brown	1	"Always There"	6	—
Divinyls	1	"I Touch Myself"	10	—
Cola Boy	1	"7 Ways to Love"	8	—
Heavy D & the Boyz	1	"Now That We Found Love"	2	—
Extreme	1	"More Than Words"	2	—
The Shamen	1	"Move Any Mountain"	4	—
Right Said Fred	2	"I'm Too Sexy"	2	"Don't Talk Just Kiss" (3) ^{[A]}
Metallica	1	"Enter Sandman"	5	—
P.M. Dawn	1	"Set Adrift on Memory Bliss"	3	—
DJ Jazzy Jeff & The Fresh Prince	1	"Summertime"	8	—
The Prodigy	1	"Charly"	3	—
The New Power Generation	1	"Gett Off"	4	—
Zoë	1	"Sunshine on a Rainy Day"	4	—
Arnee and the Terminaters	1	"I'll Be Back"	5	—
Oceanic	1	"Insanity"	3	—
Sabrina Johnston	1	"Peace"	8	—
Utah Saints	1	"What Can You Do for Me"	10	—
Rozalla	1	"Everybody's Free (To Feel Good)"	6	—
Scorpions	1	"Wind of Change"	2	—
Monty Python	1	"Always Look on the Bright Side of Life"	3	—
Kiri Te Kanawa	1	"World in Union"	4	—
2 Unlimited	1	"Get Ready for This"	2	—
Moby	1	"Go"	10	—
Keith Washington	1	"If You Were with Me Now"	4	—
K-Klass	1	"Rhythm Is a Mystery"	3	—
Bassheads	1	"Is There Anybody Out There?"	5	—
The Justified Ancients of Mu Mu	1	"It's Grim Up North"	10	—
Altern-8	1	"Activ 8 (Come with Me)"	3	—
Bizarre Inc	1	"Playing with Knives"	4	—
East Side Beat	1	"Ride Like the Wind"	3	—
Nirvana	1	"Smells Like Teen Spirit"	7	—
Tammy Wynette	1	"Justified & Ancient" ^{[B]}	2	—
Kym Sims	1	"Too Blind to See It" ^{[C]}	5	—
Shaft	1	"Roobarb and Custard" ^{[D]}	7	—

Notes

Seal made his first credited UK top 10 appearance in 1991 with "Crazy", although he was the uncredited vocalist on Adamski's 1990 number-one hit "Killer", which he co-wrote with Adamski. The group Electronic was formed by Bernard Sumner, a guitarist in New Order, and Johnny Marr, formerly of The Smiths. Both had achieved chart success with their respective bands prior to "Get the Message" reaching number 8 in their new venture. Cathy Dennis' only previous solo credit was on the Band Aid II collective single "Do They Know It's Christmas?" in 1989. "Touch Me (All Night Long)" was her first track purely attributed to her to reach the top 10. The Justified Ancients of Mu Mu was one of the pseudonyms used by the group The KLF but the Official Charts Company gives the act a separate credit on their website so it counts as a chart debut.

=== Songs from films ===
Original songs from various films entered the top 10 throughout the year. These included "The One and Only" (from Buddy’s Song), "The Shoop Shoop Song (It's in His Kiss)" (Mermaids), "I Wanna Sex You Up" (New Jack City), "Light My Fire" (The Doors), "(Everything I Do) I Do It For You" (Robin Hood: Prince Of Thieves), "You Could Be Mine" (Terminator 2: Judgment Day) and "Bohemian Rhapsody" (Wayne's World).

=== Charity singles ===
The Comic Relief single for 1991 was recorded by comedy duo Gareth Hale and Norman Pace (known together as Hale & Pace), alongside The Stonkers, consisting of Brian May (who also produced the track), David Gilmour and Tony Iommi (on guitar), Neil Murray (bass guitar), Cozy Powell, Roger Taylor and Rowan Atkinson's comic persona Mr. Bean (all on drums). The single, titled "The Stonk" peaked at number-one for one week on 23 March 1991 (week ending).

=== Best-selling singles ===
Bryan Adams had the best-selling single of the year with "Everything I Do (I Do It for You)". The single spent twenty-one weeks in the top 10 (including sixteen weeks at number-one), sold over 1.5 million copies and was certified 2× platinum by the BPI. "Bohemian Rhapsody"/"These Are the Days of Our Lives" by Queen (re-released following the death of lead singer Freddie Mercury) came in second place. Cher's "The Shoop Shoop Song (It's In His Kiss)", "I'm Too Sexy" from Right Said Fred and "Do the Bartman" by The Simpsons made up the top five. Singles by Jason Donovan, Chesney Hawkes, Vic Reeves and The Wonder Stuff, Oceanic and Color Me Badd were also in the top ten best-selling singles of the year.

"Everything I Do (I Do It for You)" (7) also ranked in the top 10 best-selling singles of the decade.

== Top-ten singles ==
Key

Symbol	Meaning
‡	Single peaked in 1990 but still in chart in 1991.
♦	Single released in 1991 but peaked in 1992.
(#)	Year-end top-ten single position and rank
Entered	The date that the single first appeared in the chart.
Peak	Highest position that the single reached in the UK Singles Chart.

Entered (week ending)	Weeks in top 10	Single	Artist	Peak	Peak reached (week ending)	Weeks at peak
Singles in 1990
24 November 1990	9	"Ice Ice Baby" ‡	Vanilla Ice	1	1 December 1990	4
8 December 1990	5	"Saviour's Day" ‡	Cliff Richard	1	29 December 1990	1
8 December 1990	5	"Justify My Love" ‡	Madonna	2	15 December 1990	1
15 December 1990	6	"All Together Now" ‡	The Farm	4	15 December 1990	1
22 December 1990	4	"You've Lost That Lovin' Feelin'"/"Ebb Tide" ‡ ^{[E]}	The Righteous Brothers	3	29 December 1990	1
22 December 1990	7	"Sadeness (Part I)"	Enigma	1	19 January 1991	1
22 December 1990	4	"Mary Had a Little Boy" ‡	Snap!	8	22 December 1990	2
22 December 1990	4	"Pray"	MC Hammer	8	12 January 1991	1
29 December 1990	5	"The Grease Megamix"	John Travolta & Olivia Newton-John	3	12 January 1991	1
Singles in 1991
5 January 1991	3	"Bring Your Daughter... to the Slaughter"	Iron Maiden	1	5 January 1991	2
12 January 1991	4	"Crazy"	Seal	2	19 January 1991	1
12 January 1991	4	"Gonna Make You Sweat (Everybody Dance Now)"	C+C Music Factory featuring Freedom Williams	3	19 January 1991	1
19 January 1991	7	"3 a.m. Eternal"	The KLF	1	2 February 1991	2
19 January 1991	1	"International Bright Young Thing"	Jesus Jones	7	19 January 1991	1
19 January 1991	2	"(I've Had) The Time of My Life" ^{[F]}	Bill Medley & Jennifer Warnes	8	26 January 1991	1
26 January 1991	2	"Innuendo"	Queen	1	26 January 1991	1
26 January 1991	5	"Wiggle It"	2 in a Room	3	9 February 1991	1
26 January 1991	1	"I Can't Take the Power"	Off-Shore	7	26 January 1991	1
26 January 1991	1	"Mercy Mercy Me"/"I Want You"	Robert Palmer	9	26 January 1991	1
2 February 1991	7	"Do the Bartman" (#5)	The Simpsons	1	16 February 1991	3
2 February 1991	2	"Cry for Help"	Rick Astley	7	2 February 1991	1
2 February 1991	3	"Hippy Chick" ^{[G]}	Soho	8	2 February 1991	2
2 February 1991	3	"I Believe"	EMF	6	9 February 1991	1
9 February 1991	6	"(I Wanna Give You) Devotion"	Nomad featuring MC Mikee Freedom	2	23 February 1991	1
9 February 1991	3	"Only You"	Praise	4	16 February 1991	1
9 February 1991	3	"What Do I Have to Do"	Kylie Minogue	6	16 February 1991	1
9 February 1991	1	"Play That Funky Music"	Vanilla Ice	10	9 February 1991	1
16 February 1991	4	"Get Here"	Oleta Adams	4	23 February 1991	1
16 February 1991	2	"G.L.A.D"	Kim Appleby	10	16 February 1991	2
23 February 1991	5	"You Got the Love"	The Source featuring Candi Staton	4	2 March 1991	2
23 February 1991	2	"In Yer Face"	808 State	9	23 February 1991	2
2 March 1991	3	"Crazy for You (Remix)" ^{[H]}	Madonna	2	2 March 1991	2
2 March 1991	5	"Should I Stay or Should I Go" ^{[I]}	The Clash	1	9 March 1991	2
2 March 1991	2	"All Right Now (Remix)" ^{[J]}	Free	8	2 March 1991	2
2 March 1991	4	"Move Your Body (Elevation)"	Xpansions	7	9 March 1991	2
9 March 1991	3	"Because I Love You (The Postman Song)"	Stevie B	6	9 March 1991	3
9 March 1991	5	"The Stonk" ^{[K]}	Hale and Pace & The Stonkers ^{[L]}	1	23 March 1991	1
16 March 1991	6	"Joyride"	Roxette	4	23 March 1991	2
16 March 1991	4	"It's Too Late"	Quartz featuring Dina Carroll	8	23 March 1991	3
23 March 1991	5	"Rhythm of My Heart"	Rod Stewart	3	23 March 1991	3
23 March 1991	8	"The One and Only" (#7)	Chesney Hawkes	1	30 March 1991	5
23 March 1991	3	"Where the Streets Have No Name (I Can't Take My Eyes Off You)"/"How Can You Expect to Be Taken Seriously?"	Pet Shop Boys	4	30 March 1991	1
30 March 1991	2	"Let There Be Love"	Simple Minds	6	30 March 1991	1
30 March 1991	7	"Sit Down" ^{[M]}	James	2	6 April 1991	3
30 March 1991	2	"Secret Love"	Bee Gees	5	6 April 1991	1
6 April 1991	1	"Snap! Megamix"	Snap!	10	6 April 1991	1
13 April 1991	4	"The Whole of the Moon"	The Waterboys	3	13 April 1991	1
13 April 1991	3	"Rescue Me"	Madonna	3	20 April 1991	1
13 April 1991	3	"The Size of a Cow"	The Wonder Stuff	5	20 April 1991	1
13 April 1991	2	"Anthem"	N-Joi	8	13 April 1991	1
13 April 1991	3	"Deep, Deep Trouble"	The Simpsons	7	20 April 1991	2
13 April 1991	2	"Love and Kisses"	Dannii Minogue	8	20 April 1991	1
27 April 1991	10	"The Shoop Shoop Song (It's in His Kiss)" (#3)	Cher	1	4 May 1991	5
27 April 1991	5	"Sailing on the Seven Seas"	Orchestral Manoeuvres in the Dark	3	11 May 1991	1
27 April 1991	5	"Senza una donna (Without a Woman)"	Zucchero featuring Paul Young	4	11 May 1991	1
27 April 1991	1	"Human Nature"	Gary Clail On-U Sound System	10	27 April 1991	1
4 May 1991	6	"Last Train to Trancentral"	The KLF	2	11 May 1991	2
4 May 1991	2	"Born Free"	Vic Reeves & The Roman Numerals	6	4 May 1991	2
4 May 1991	3	"Get the Message"	Electronic	8	11 May 1991	1
4 May 1991	1	"Ring Ring Ring (Ha Ha Hey)"	De La Soul	10	4 May 1991	1
11 May 1991	4	"Touch Me (All Night Long)"	Cathy Dennis	5	18 May 1991	1
11 May 1991	2	"There's No Other Way"	Blur	8	18 May 1991	1
18 May 1991	5	"Gypsy Woman"	Crystal Waters	2	25 May 1991	1
18 May 1991	6	"Promise Me"	Beverley Craven	3	25 May 1991	1
18 May 1991	4	"Tainted Love '91" ^{[N]}	Soft Cell featuring Marc Almond	5	25 May 1991	1
25 May 1991	8	"I Wanna Sex You Up" (#10)	Color Me Badd	1	8 June 1991	3
25 May 1991	6	"Baby Baby"	Amy Grant	2	15 June 1991	1
1 June 1991	4	"Shiny Happy People"	R.E.M.	6	15 June 1991	1
1 June 1991	3	"Shocked"	Kylie Minogue	6	8 June 1991	1
8 June 1991	2	"Light My Fire" ^{[O]}	The Doors	7	15 June 1991	1
15 June 1991	1	"Holiday" ^{[P]}	Madonna	5	15 June 1991	1
15 June 1991	6	"Thinking About Your Love"	Kenny Thomas	4	29 June 1991	1
22 June 1991	7	"Any Dream Will Do" (#6)	Jason Donovan	1	29 June 1991	2
22 June 1991	3	"Do You Want Me"	Salt-N-Pepa	5	29 June 1991	1
22 June 1991	3	"From a Distance"	Bette Midler	6	29 June 1991	1
22 June 1991	1	"Only Fools (Never Fall in Love)"	Sonia	10	22 June 1991	1
29 June 1991	4	"Chorus"	Erasure	3	29 June 1991	2
29 June 1991	21	"(Everything I Do) I Do It for You" (#1)	Bryan Adams	1	13 July 1991	16
29 June 1991	1	"The Motown Song"	Rod Stewart	10	29 June 1991	1
6 July 1991	4	"Rush Rush"	Paula Abdul	6	20 July 1991	2
6 July 1991	3	"Always There"	Incognito featuring Jocelyn Brown	6	13 July 1991	1
6 July 1991	1	"I Touch Myself"	Divinyls	10	6 July 1991	1
13 July 1991	4	"You Could Be Mine"	Guns N' Roses	3	13 July 1991	2
13 July 1991	2	"7 Ways to Love"	Cola Boy ^{[Q]}	8	13 July 1991	1
13 July 1991	7	"Now That We Found Love"	Heavy D & the Boyz	2	27 July 1991	1
20 July 1991	4	"Things That Make You Go Hmmm..."	C+C Music Factory featuring Freedom Williams	4	27 July 1991	1
27 July 1991	3	"Pandora's Box"	Orchestral Manoeuvres in the Dark	7	27 July 1991	2
27 July 1991	6	"More Than Words"	Extreme	2	3 August 1991	2
27 July 1991	5	"Move Any Mountain"	The Shamen	4	3 August 1991	3
27 July 1991	2	"Love and Understanding"	Cher	10	27 July 1991	2
3 August 1991	1	"Jump to the Beat"	Dannii Minogue	8	3 August 1991	1
10 August 1991	10	"I'm Too Sexy" (#4)	Right Said Fred	2	17 August 1991	6
10 August 1991	2	"Enter Sandman"	Metallica	5	10 August 1991	1
10 August 1991	3	"Winter In July"	Bomb the Bass	7	10 August 1991	3
10 August 1991	1	"Twist and Shout"	Deacon Blue	10	10 August 1991	1
17 August 1991	5	"Set Adrift on Memory Bliss"	P.M. Dawn	3	24 August 1991	2
17 August 1991	4	"All 4 Love"	Color Me Badd	5	24 August 1991	1
17 August 1991	2	"Summertime"	DJ Jazzy Jeff & The Fresh Prince	8	24 August 1991	1
24 August 1991	6	"Charly"	The Prodigy	3	7 September 1991	2
31 August 1991	3	"Gett Off"	Prince & The New Power Generation	4	7 September 1991	1
31 August 1991	6	"Sunshine on a Rainy Day" ^{[R]}	Zoë	4	14 September 1991	1
31 August 1991	3	"I'll Be Back"	Arnee and the Terminaters	5	7 September 1991	1
31 August 1991	1	"Happy Together"	Jason Donovan	10	31 August 1991	1
7 September 1991	9	"Insanity" (#9)	Oceanic	3	28 September 1991	3
7 September 1991	2	"Love... Thy Will Be Done"	Martika	9	7 September 1991	2
14 September 1991	7	"Let's Talk About Sex"	Salt-N-Pepa	2	28 September 1991	2
21 September 1991	5	"Love to Hate You"	Erasure	4	28 September 1991	2
21 September 1991	1	"Don't Cry"	Guns N' Roses	8	21 September 1991	1
21 September 1991	4	"Peace"	Sabrina Johnston	8	28 September 1991	2
21 September 1991	2	"What Can You Do for Me"	Utah Saints	10	21 September 1991	2
28 September 1991	4	"Everybody's Free (To Feel Good)"	Rozalla	6	5 October 1991	1
5 October 1991	6	"Wind of Change"	Scorpions	2	12 October 1991	2
5 October 1991	4	"Saltwater"	Julian Lennon	6	12 October 1991	1
12 October 1991	5	"Always Look on the Bright Side of Life"	Monty Python	3	19 October 1991	1
19 October 1991	5	"World in Union" ^{[S]}	Kiri Te Kanawa	4	19 October 1991	2
19 October 1991	7	"Get Ready for This"	2 Unlimited	2	26 October 1991	2
26 October 1991	7	"Dizzy" (#8)	Vic Reeves & The Wonder Stuff	1	9 November 1991	2
26 October 1991	1	"Change"	Lisa Stansfield	10	26 October 1991	1
2 November 1991	3	"The Fly"	U2	1	2 November 1991	1
2 November 1991	3	"No Son of Mine"	Genesis	6	9 November 1991	1
2 November 1991	1	"Go"	Moby	10	2 November 1991	1
9 November 1991	3	"If You Were with Me Now"	Kylie Minogue & Keith Washington	4	16 November 1991	1
9 November 1991	3	"Rhythm Is a Mystery"	K-Klass	3	16 November 1991	1
9 November 1991	3	"Is There Anybody Out There?"	Bassheads	5	23 November 1991	1
16 November 1991	1	"It's Grim Up North"	The Justified Ancients of Mu Mu ^{[T]}	10	16 November 1991	1
23 November 1991	5	"Black or White"	Michael Jackson	1	23 November 1991	2
23 November 1991	3	"Activ 8 (Come with Me)"	Altern-8	3	30 November 1991	1
23 November 1991	1	"Killer"	Seal	8	23 November 1991	1
23 November 1991	3	"Playing with Knives" ^{[T]}	Bizarre Inc	4	30 November 1991	1
23 November 1991	2	"When a Man Loves a Woman"	Michael Bolton	8	30 November 1991	1
30 November 1991	3	"Ride Like the Wind"	East Side Beat	3	7 December 1991	1
30 November 1991	3	"Smells Like Teen Spirit"	Nirvana	7	7 December 1991	1
30 November 1991	7	"When You Tell Me That You Love Me"	Diana Ross	2	14 December 1991	2
7 December 1991	6	"Don't Let the Sun Go Down on Me"	George Michael & Elton John	1	7 December 1991	2
7 December 1991	8	"Justified & Ancient" ♦	The KLF featuring Tammy Wynette	2	4 January 1992	2
7 December 1991	1	"Sound"	James	9	7 December 1991	1
14 December 1991	4	"Driven by You"	Brian May	6	14 December 1991	2
14 December 1991	1	"Stars"	Simply Red	8	14 December 1991	1
14 December 1991	1	"If You Go Away"	New Kids on the Block	9	14 December 1991	1
14 December 1991	7	"Too Blind to See It" ♦	Kym Sims	5	11 January 1992	2
21 December 1991	8	"Bohemian Rhapsody"/"These Are the Days of Our Lives" (#2)	Queen	1	21 December 1991	5
21 December 1991	3	"Live and Let Die"	Guns N' Roses	5	21 December 1991	1
21 December 1991	5	"Don't Talk Just Kiss" ♦	Right Said Fred	3	11 January 1992	1
21 December 1991	1	"We Should Be Together"	Cliff Richard	10	21 December 1991	1
28 December 1991	4	"Addams Groove" ♦	MC Hammer	4	11 January 1992	1
28 December 1991	3	"Roobarb and Custard" ♦	Shaft	7	11 January 1992	1

== Entries by artist ==
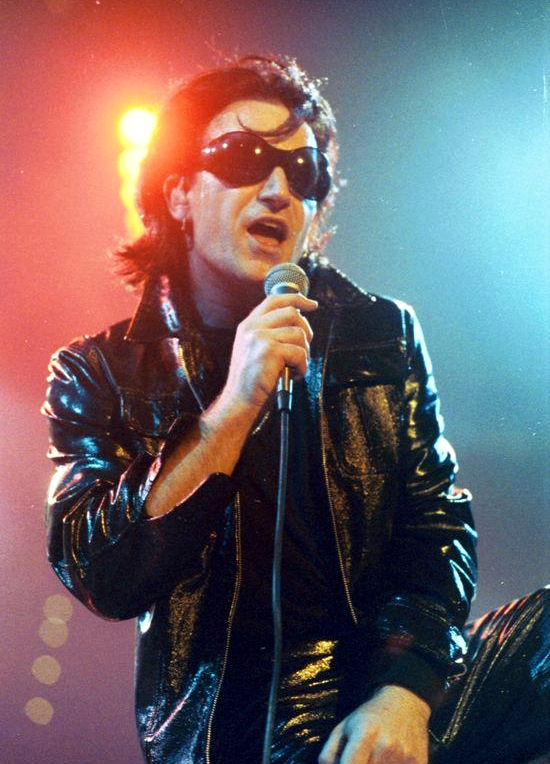
Bono and his band U2 made a return to the UK top 10 in 1991 with their number-one single "The Fly".

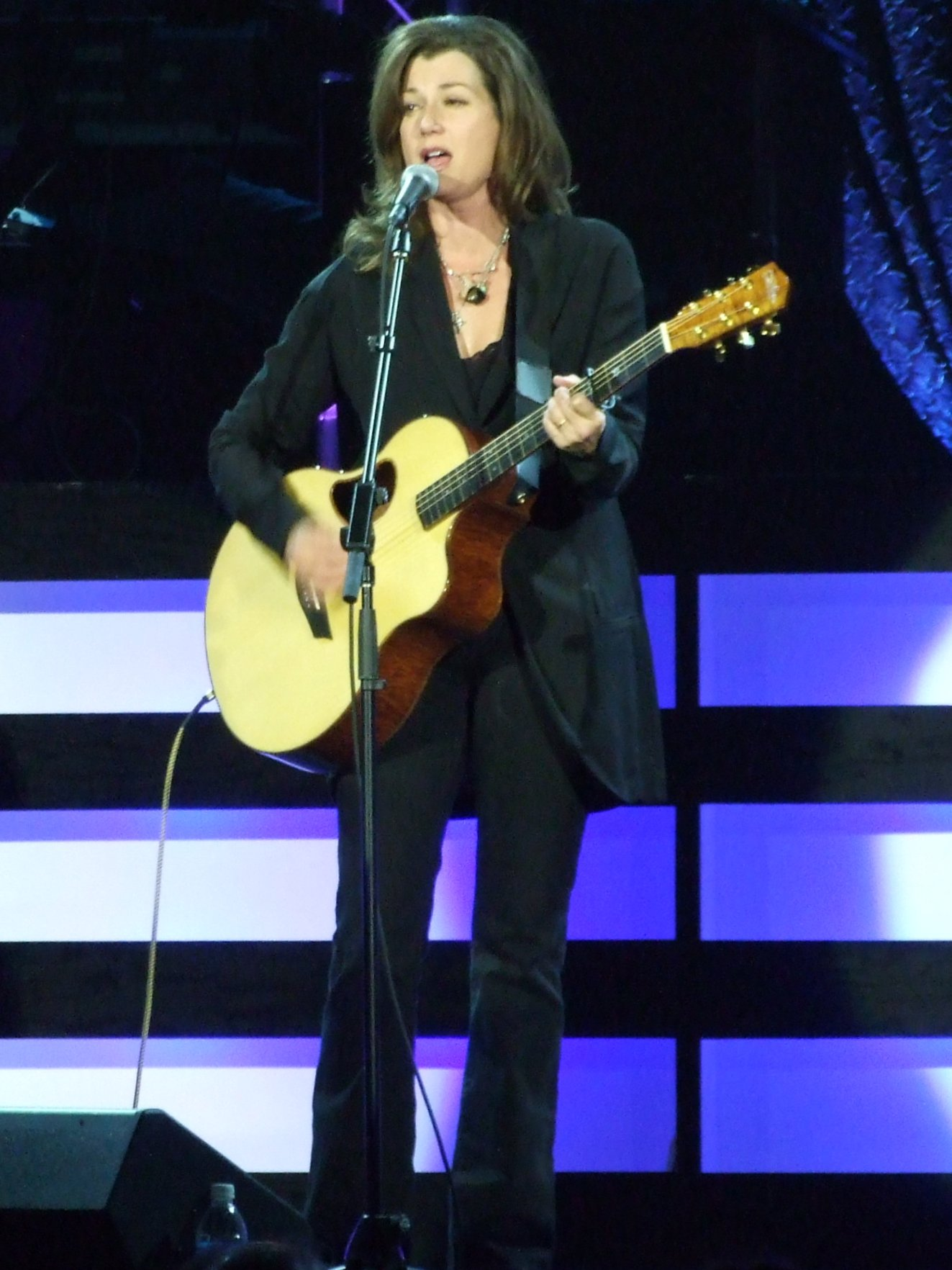
American singer-songwriter Amy Grant (pictured in 2008) achieved her sole UK top 10 hit this year with "Baby Baby", which peaked at number two in June.

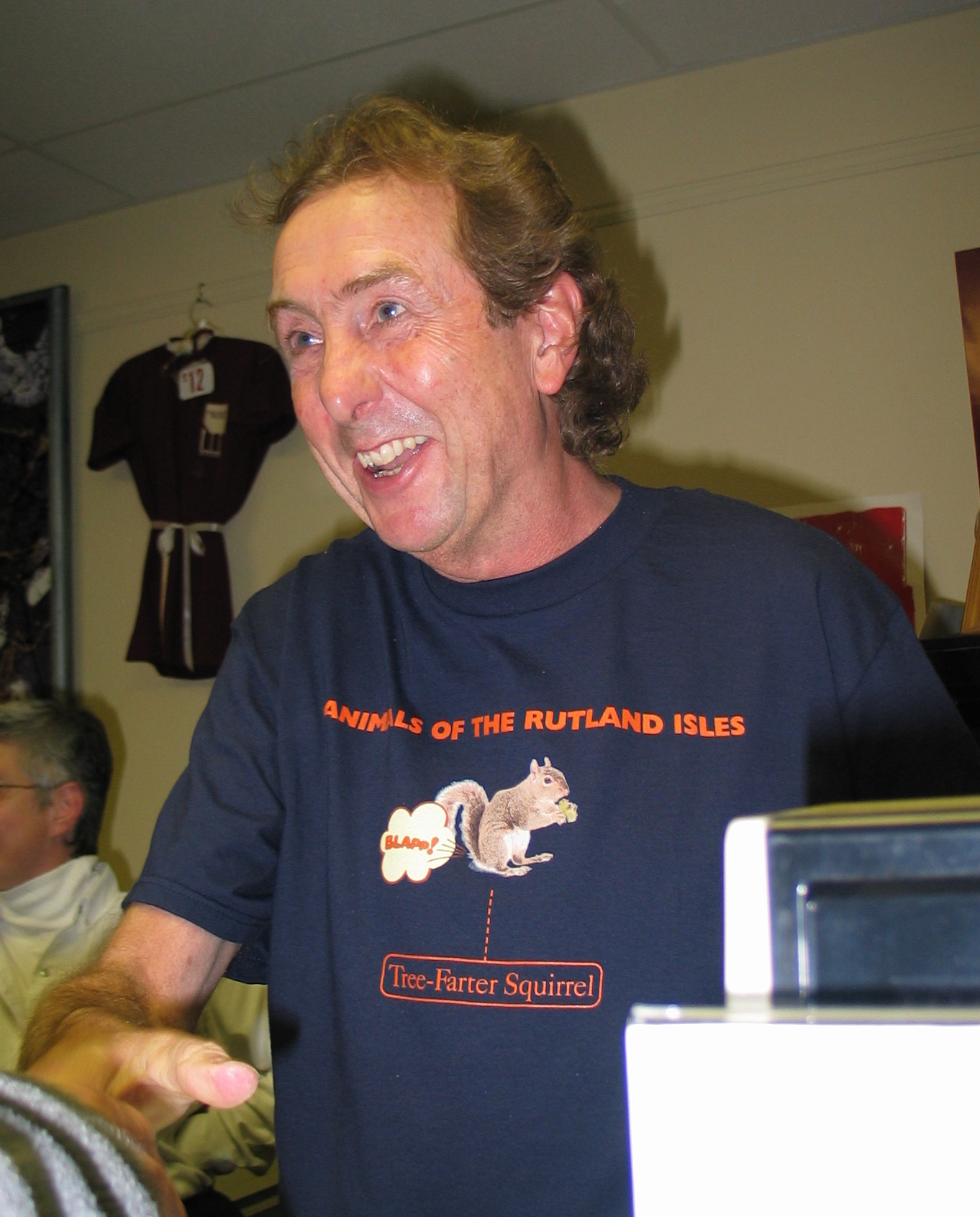
Eric Idle (pictured in 2003) wrote and sang lead vocals on Monty Python's "Always Look on the Bright Side of Life", which reached number three in the UK charts in October 1991.

The following table shows artists who achieved two or more top 10 entries in 1991, including singles that reached their peak in 1990 or 1992. The figures include both main artists and featured artists, while appearances on ensemble charity records are also counted for each artist.

Entries	Artist	Weeks	Singles
4	Brian May ^{[V]}^{[W]}	12	"Bohemian Rhapsody"/"These Are the Days of Our Lives", "Driven By You", "Innuendo", "The Stonk"
4	The KLF ^{[X]}^{[Y]}	13	"3am Eternal", "It's Grim Up North", "Justified & Ancient", "Last Train to Trancentral"
4	Madonna ^{[Z]}	8	"Crazy for You", "Holiday", "Justify My Love", "Rescue Me"
3	Guns N' Roses	7	"Don't Cry", "Live and Let Die", "You Could Be Mine"
3	Kylie Minogue	9	"If You Were with Me Now", "Shocked", "What Do I Have to Do"
3	Roger Taylor ^{[V]}^{[W]}	9	"Bohemian Rhapsody"/"These Are the Days of Our Lives", "Innuendo", "The Stonk"
2	C+C Music Factory	8	"Gonna Make You Sweat (Everybody Dance Now)", "Things That Make You Go Hmmm...
2	Cher	12	"Love and Understanding", "The Shoop Shoop Song (It's In His Kiss)"
2	Cliff Richard ^{[Z]}	2	"Saviour's Day", "We Should Be Together"
2	Color Me Badd	12	"All 4 Love", "I Wanna Sex You Up"
2	Dannii Minogue	3	"Jump to the Beat", "Love and Kisses"
2	Erasure	9	"Chorus", "Love to Hate You"
2	Freedom Williams ^{[AA]}	8	"Gonna Make You Sweat (Everybody Dance Now)", "Things That Make You Go Hmmm..."
2	James	8	"Sit Down", "Sound"
2	Jason Donovan	8	"Any Dream Will Do", "Happy Together"
2	MC Hammer ^{[Y]}^{[BB]}	3	"Addams Groove", "Pray"
2	Orchestral Manoeuvres in the Dark	8	"Pandora's Box", "Sailing on the Seven Seas"
2	Queen	4	"Bohemian Rhapsody"/"These Are the Days of Our Lives", "Innuendo"
2	Right Said Fred ^{[Y]}	12	"Don't Talk Just Kiss", "I'm Too Sexy"
2	Rod Stewart	6	"Rhythm of My Heart", "The Motown Song"
2	Salt-N-Pepa	10	"Do You Want Me", "Let's Talk About Sex"
2	Seal	5	"Crazy", "Killer"
2	The Simpsons	10	"Deep, Deep Trouble", "Do the Bartman"
2	Snap! ^{[Z]}	3	"Mary Had a Little Boy", "Snap! Megamix"
2	Vanilla Ice ^{[Z]}	4	"Ice Ice Baby", "Play That Funky Music"
2	Vic Reeves	9	"Born Free", "Dizzy"
2	The Wonder Stuff	10	"Dizzy", "The Size of a Cow"

== Notes ==
- ^{a} "Don't Talk Just Kiss" reached its peak of number three on 11 January 1992 (week ending).
- ^{b} "Justified & Ancient" reached its peak of number two on 4 January 1992 (week ending).
- ^{c} "Too Blind to See It" reached its peak of number five on 11 January 1992 (week ending).
- ^{d} "Roobarb and Custard" reached its peak of number seven on 11 January 1992 (week ending).
- ^{e} "You've Lost That Lovin' Feelin'" originally peaked at number-one upon its initial release in 1965. It previously re-entered the top 10 at number 10 in 1969, number 42 in 1977 and number 87 in 1988. "Ebb Tide" originally peaked at number 48 on its initial release in 1966.
- ^{f} "(I've Had) The Time Of My Life" originally peaked at number 6 on its initial release in 1987. It re-entered the top 10 in January 1991 after the film Dirty Dancing premiered on British television.
- ^{g} "Hippy Chick" originally peaked outside the top 10 at number 67 upon its initial release in 1990.
- ^{h} The original version of "Crazy for You" peaked at number 2 upon its release in 1985.
- ^{i} "Should I Stay or Should I Go" originally peaked outside the top 10 at number 17 upon its initial release in 1982. It was re-released in 1991 after being used in a television advertising campaign for Levi's jeans.
- ^{j} The original version of "All Right Now" peaked at number 2 upon its release in 1970.
- ^{k} Released as the official single for Comic Relief.
- ^{l} The Stonkers was a charity collective made up of various musicians and performers including Brian May, David Gilmour, Tony Iommi, Neil Murray, Cozy Powell, Roger Taylor and Mr. Bean (played by Rowan Atkinson).
- ^{m} "Sit Down" originally peaked outside the top 10 at number 77 upon on its initial release in 1989.
- ^{n} "Tainted Love" originally peaked at number-one upon its initial release in 1981.
- ^{o} "Light My Fire" originally peaked outside the top 10 at number 49 upon its initial release in 1967.
- ^{p} "Holiday" first reached the top 10 on its initial release in 1984, peaking at number six It re-entered the top 10 the following year, reaching a new peak of number two.
- ^{q} Cola Boy was a pseudonym used by the group Saint Etienne for two single releases, including "7 Ways to Love". Janey Lee Grace was an uncredited vocalist on this song.
- ^{r} "Sunshine on a Rainy Day" originally peaked outside the top 10 at number 53 upon its initial release in 1990.
- ^{s} "World in Union" was recorded as an anthem for the Rugby World Cup in 1991.
- ^{t} The Justified Ancients of Mu Mu was a name used by The KLF for their song "It's Grim Up North".
- ^{u} "Playing with Knives" originally peaked outside the top 10 at number 43 upon its initial release in 1991. It was re-released the same year and reached its new peak of number four.
- ^{v} Figure includes two top 10 hits with the group Queen.
- ^{w} Figure includes an appearance on the Comic Relief single "The Stonk" as a member of The Stonkers.
- ^{x} Figure includes the single "It's Grim Up North" under the pseudonym The Justified Ancients of Mu Mu.
- ^{y} Figure includes single that peaked in 1992.
- ^{z} Figure includes single that peaked in 1990.
- ^{aa} Figure includes appearances on C+C Music Factory's "Gonna Make You Sweat (Everybody Dance Now)".
- ^{bb} Figure includes single that first charted in 1990 but peaked in 1991.

== See also ==
- 1991 in British music
- List of number-one singles from the 1990s (UK)
