= Sesame's Treet (album) =

Studio album by Smart E's
- Released: 1992
- Genre: Techno
- Label: Atlantic
- Producers: Luna-C, Mr. Tom, Nick Arnold

Professional ratings
Review scores
Source	Rating
AllMusic	3/5 stars

Sesame's Treet is a 1992 album by British musical group Smart E's. It was produced by Luna-C, Mr. Tom, and Nick Arnold.

== Track listings ==
1. "Apollo (Lunar Mix)" – 4:45
2. "Magnificent" – 4:20
3. "Make It Happen" – 3:23
4. "Sesame's Treet" – 3:31
5. "Love Is Blind" – 4:59
6. "The Law" – 7:01*
7. "Charlie" – 2:17
8. "Loo's Control" – 4:00
9. "A Most Excellent Choon" – 4:01**
10. "Intruder Alert" – 4:58
11. "Bizarrely Odd" – 5:14
12. "Time Out" – 3:49
13. "Beautiful Noises" – 1:52

*Remix of "Fuck the Law", originally released on the Smart E's single "Bogus Adventure/Fuck the Law"

**Remix of "Bogus Adventure", originally released on the Smart E's single "Bogus Adventure/Fuck the Law"
