= Bogus Adventure/Fuck the Law =

Single by Smart E's

from the album Sesame's Treet
- Released: 1992
- Genre: Breakbeat hardcore, techno
- Label: Boogie Times

Smart E's singles chronology
"Bogus Adventure/Fuck the Law" (1992)	"Loo's Control" (1992)

"Bogus Adventure/Fuck the Law" is the debut single and first double A-side by the British rave group Smart E's. The single was limited to 500 copies. "Bogus Adventure" samples the film Bill and Ted's Excellent Adventure during the scene talking about "Wyld Stallions". The sample is found at the start of the track. The single's second A-side, "Fuck the Law", samples the film Nightbreed.

== Track listings ==
1. "Bogus Adventure" (Ultimatum Mix)
2. "Fuck the Law" (102 Mix)
