= A Trip to Trumpton =

Single by Urban Hype

from the album Conspiracy to Dance
- Released: 29 June 1992
- Recorded: 1992
- Genre: Toytown techno; breakbeat hardcore
- Label: Faze 2
- Songwriters: Robert Dibden; Mark Chitty; Freddie Phillips
- Producer: Urban Hype

"A Trip to Trumpton" is a song by the English duo Urban Hype. It was released on 29 June 1992, by label Faze 2, as the lead single from their debut studio album, Conspiracy to Dance (1992). Songwriting credits were shared by Freddie Phillips, the composer of the original music for Trumpton. The track was engineered by the DJ Jack Smooth, who conceived the idea, co-wrote and produced it without proper credit. It featured samples from the 1960s children's television programme, Trumpton.

It followed a popular trend at the time of releasing tracks based on children's TV samples - the first of other songs that did this was "Summers Magic" by Mark Summers (20 January 1991), featuring the theme tune of the BBC's The Magic Roundabout, then 6 months later was The Prodigy's "Charly" (7 July 1991), based on the Charley Says series of public information films from the 1970s, and 18 months after "Summers Magic" was Smart E's "Sesame's Treet" (29 June 1992), which sampled the theme music from Sesame Street. This subgenre was dubbed toytown techno.

== Track listing ==
7-inch single

Side one
No.	Title	Length
1.	"A Trip to Trumpton"

Side two
No.	Title	Length
2.	"The Trumpton Remix (Edit)"

12-inch single

Side one
No.	Title	Length
1.	"A Trip to Trumpton"

Side two
No.	Title	Length
2.	"A Trip to Trumpton (The Trumpton Remix)"

CD single

No.	Title	Length
1.	"A Trip to Trumpton (Radio Edit)"	3:34
2.	"A Trip to Trumpton (12" Club Version)"	4:57
3.	"A Trip to Trumpton (The Trumpton Remix)"	5:07
4.	"The Dream"	4:34

Cassette single

Side one
No.	Title	Length
1.	"A Trip to Trumpton (Radio Edit)"	3:34
2.	"A Trip to Trumpton (12" Club Version)"	4:57

Side two
No.	Title	Length
3.	"A Trip to Trumpton (The Trumpton Remix)"	5:07
4.	"The Dream"	4:34

== Charts ==
Chart (1992)	Peak position
Australia (ARIA)	187
Ireland (IRMA)	21
UK Singles (Official Charts)	6
