= Sesame's Treet =

1992 single by Smart E's

- UK 7-inch single artwork

Single by Smart E's

from the album Sesame's Treet
- B-side: "Magnificent"
- Released: 29 June 1992
- Genre: Toytown techno; rave-pop
- Length: 5:09 (12-inch version); 3:33 (edit)
- Label: Suburban Base
- Songwriters: Joe Raposo; Jon Stone; Bruce Hart
- Producers: Nick Arnold; Luna-C; Mr. Tom

Smart E's singles chronology
"Loo's Control" (1992)	"Sesame's Treet" (1992)

Music video
- "Sesame's Treet" on YouTube

Alternative cover
- US maxi-CD single artwork

"Sesame's Treet" is a song by the English rave group Smart E's. It is a remix of "Can You Tell Me How to Get to Sesame Street?", with the song's title being a pun on "Sesame Street". The song reached No. 2 on the UK Singles Chart in July 1992 and peaked within the top 10 in Australia, Ireland, and New Zealand. In the United States, it reached No. 60 on the Billboard Hot 100 chart and topped the Billboard Maxi-Singles Sales ranking.

== Background ==
At the time of its creation, dance music was not played on major radio stations. London radio station Kiss FM soon became legal but developed a slightly more commercial style. According to Luna-C of Smart E's, "It was good, because now our music was getting the recognition it deserved, but it was crap, because the money men forced it to be less than it was trying to be."

Kiss FM DJ Steve Jackson obtained the record and played it on the radio. Its popularity dramatically increased, and Smart E's was signed to Atlantic Records.

"Sesame's Treet" followed a trend at the time of releasing tracks based on samples of children's TV themes. The first notable song that did this was "Summers Magic" by Mark Summers (January 1991), featuring the theme tune of the BBC's The Magic Roundabout. The Prodigy's "Charly" and Urban Hype's "A Trip to Trumpton" were two similar rave tunes of that era, also sampling from children's programmes (collectively known as "toytown techno").

== Critical reception ==
Larry Flick from Billboard magazine wrote, "Theme from classic kiddie TV show is the hook on which this contagious pop/techno jam hangs. The contrast between rigid synth riffs and the bouncy melody are jolting good fun. "Hardcore" mix of the track was a fave among rave jocks on Belgian import a while back, and lighter, less-confrontational remix is custom-made for crossover and top 40 radio's increasing interest in techno. Could be the novelty smash of the year". Marisa Fox from Entertainment Weekly commented, "Thanks to sheer novelty value, this trio's hyper, adolescent rave version of the Sesame Street theme song skyrocketed to No. 2 on the U.K. pop charts. Over the course of Sesame's Treet, though, Smart E's seems a little behind the times, dishing out a few inspired dance flavors but mostly repetitious break beats."

== Music video ==
The music video for the song displayed an A-Z of the rave scene as follows (in the following order):

A is for 'Ardcore
B is for B.P.M.
C is 4 Chill Out
D is for Dance
F is for Flyerz
G is for Get Down
H is for Handz In The Air
I is for In The Mix
J is 4 Jack
K is for Kosmos
L is for Love (Summers Of)
M is 4 MC
N is for Nine-0-9
P is for Pumpin'
Q is for Q-Bass
R is for Rave
S is for Smart E's
T is for Techno
O is for Oops
U is for Ultra Violet
V is for Vinyl
W is for Warehouse
X is for X-press Yourself
Y is for Yeah! Yeah! Yeah!
Z is for Zero Gravity

Notable is the absence of the letter E. Presumably, this implied ecstasy, and its absence was either due to not wanting to promote drug use in a commercial music video, or it was deliberately left out to imply that whether or not a raver took ecstasy was their personal choice. The video was filmed in Victoria Park, London.

== Track listings ==
- Suburban Base Records (UK) and Possum Records (Australia)
1. "Sesame's Treet" (edit) – 3:33
2. "Sesame's Treet" (Krome & Time Remix) – 5:22
3. "Magnificent" – 4:36
4. "Sesame's Treet" (12-inch version) – 5:10
- Pyrotech/Big Beat/Atlantic Records (US)
1. "Sesame's Treet" (edit) – 3:33
2. "Sesame's Treet" (12-inch version) – 5:10
3. "Sesame's Treet" (Krome & Time Remix) – 5:22
4. "Sesame's Treet" (Beltram Mix) – 5:04
5. "Sesame's Treet" (Hardcore Mix) – 3:22
6. "Magnificent" – 4:36
- ZYX Records (Germany)
1. "Sesame's Treet" (edit) – 3:33
2. "Sesame's Treet" (Krome & Time Remix) – 5:22
3. "Sesame's Treet" (12-inch version) – 5:10
4. "Magnificent" – 4:36

== Charts ==
=== Weekly charts ===
Chart (1992)	Peak position
Australia (ARIA)	6
Europe (Eurochart Hot 100)	12
Ireland (IRMA)	4
New Zealand (Recorded Music NZ)	4
UK Singles (Official Charts)	2
UK Dance (Music Week)	1
UK Club Chart (Music Week)	68
UK Indie (Music Week)	1
US Billboard Hot 100	60
US Dance Club Play (Billboard)	20
US Maxi-Singles Sales (Billboard)	1
US Top 40/Rhythm-Crossover (Billboard)	39
US Cash Box Top 100	54

=== Year-end charts ===
Chart (1992)	Position
Australia (ARIA)	74
UK Singles (OCC)	27
US Maxi-Singles Sales (Billboard)	35

== Release history ==
Region	Date	Format(s)	Label(s)	Ref.
United Kingdom	29 June 1992	—N/a	Suburban Base	
Australia	10 August 1992	Cassette	Possum	
