= Schak =

DJ from Monkseaton/Whitley Bay area of Tyne and Wear, North East England

- Born: Shakeil Luciano; North Shields, Tyne and Wear, England
- Genres: Mákina
- Occupation: DJ
- Label: Trick

Shakeil Luciano, known professionally as Schak, is a DJ from North Shields, Tyne and Wear, in North East England.

Prior to becoming a DJ, Schak worked as a lifeguard and later for HM Revenue and Customs.

Schak released his debut single "Moving All Around (Jumpin')" on Trick Records in October 2022. The song samples "Bumpin' & Jumpin'" by Kim English. Following its release, Schak has held flash mobs in various locations, including a B&Q store, a Tyne and Wear Metro train, the Shields Ferry, on board a bus, and outside of St James Park following a Newcastle United victory. During these events, Schak performed a DJ set. The track was also awarded BBC Radio 1's Hottest Record by Danny Howard.

Schak has been involved in the north east Mákina scene and is behind the character Nanna Makina.
