= Alpha Team (band) =

Alpha Team was an American musical rave duo from Chicago who had a pop and dance hit with the song "Speed". This song sampled the theme from Speed Racer and also included snippets of dialog from that show. The song peaked at #74 on the Billboard Hot 100, staying on that chart for eight weeks beginning in January 1993. "Speed" peaked at number 16 on the Australian ARIA charts.

Selling more than 180,000 units, the success of this recording allowed its label, Strictly Hype Records, to stay in business and significantly expand with other artists.
