= Oceanic (band) =

English EDM group

- Origin: Wallasey, Merseyside, England
- Genres: Pop; house; techno
- Labels: Dead Dead Good; Oceanic Productions LTD
- Past members: David Harry; Frank Crofts; Jorinde Williams; Andy Lea

Oceanic were an English electronic dance music group, consisting of David Harry, Frank Crofts and singer Jorinde Williams.

== Biography ==
The band were most famous for the dance hit song, "Insanity", which was released in 1991. This was the group's biggest commercial success, reaching No. 3 in the UK singles chart for three weeks and the ninth biggest-selling UK single of 1991. The track also made the Australian Top 40.

Later that year they released the follow-up, "Wicked Love", which reached No. 25 in the UK singles chart. In 1992 the act released their first and only album, entitled That Compact Disc by Oceanic, (also, That Cassette/LP By Oceanic for the audio cassette/LP versions respectively) which featured two different versions of "Insanity", and reached a chart position of No. 49 before dropping out of the UK Albums Chart after only 2 weeks. A third single, "Controlling Me", made No. 14 in the UK chart. Their final song to appear on the charts was "Ignorance" (with Siobhan Maher Kennedy), which was on the UK chart at No. 72 for one week in November 1992.

The group performed on several TV shows between 1991 and 1993, including four appearances on Top of the Pops, plus The Hitman and Her and an episode of Frank Sidebottom's Fantastic Shed Show.

== Discography ==
=== Albums ===
List of albums, with selected chart positions
Title	Album details	Peak chart positions	
Title	Album details	UK	AUS
That Album / That Cassette	Released: June 1992; Format: CD, CS; Label: Dead Dead Good / EastWest	49	131

=== Singles ===
List of singles, with selected chart positions
Title	Year	Peak positions			Album
Title	Year	UK	AUS	IRE	Album
"Insanity"	1991	3	31	—	That (CD/Cassette/Album) by Oceanic
"Wicked Love"	1991	25	96	—	That (CD/Cassette/Album) by Oceanic
"Controlling Me"	1992	14	168	19	That (CD/Cassette/Album) by Oceanic
"Ignorance"	1992	72	—	—	That (CD/Cassette/Album) by Oceanic
"Celebration"	1993	—	—	—	Non-album singles
"Insanity '99"	1999	—	—	—	Non-album singles
"—" denotes releases that did not chart or were not released.
