= Mark Summers =

English sound engineer and music producer

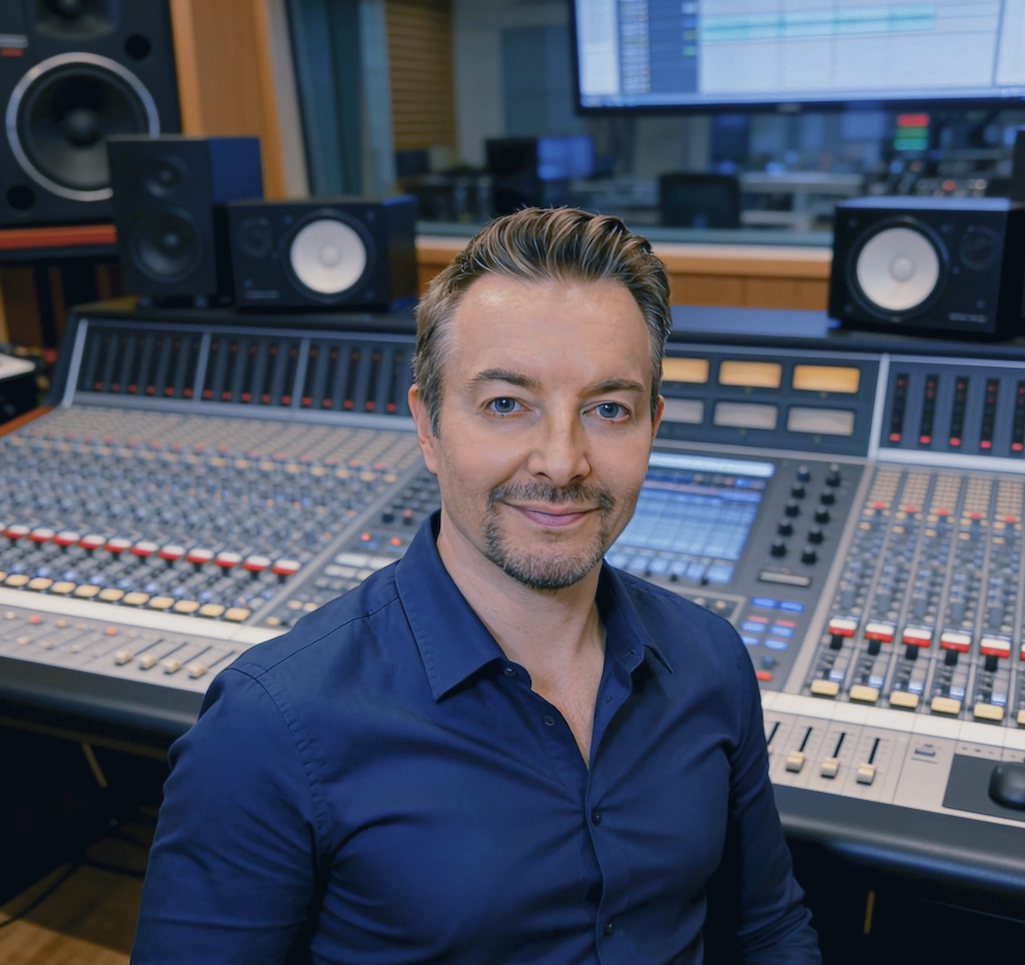
- Summers at SCORCCIO studio Barcelona, 2026
- Born: London, England
- Occupations: Music producer; sound designer/engineer/mixer; DJ; singer; musician; songwriter
- Years active: 1989–present
- Awards: MTV VMA Winner 2005: Best Video Game Soundtrack (Sony Playstation)
- Website: scorccio.com

Mark Summers is the English CEO, sound engineer and music producer of Scorccio, a music production company founded in the UK in 1996. A London DJ since 1979, he is a guest lecturer and masterclass presenter on sample replay production, sound engineering, DJ culture, sampling and the music industry. His productions have been featured on hits for Nicki Minaj, Diplo, Sam Smith, the Prodigy, Pitbull, Fatboy Slim, James Hype, Jess Glynne, Disclosure, Steve Aoki, CamelPhat, Swedish House Mafia, the Shapeshifters and many other notable music artists. He is related to Herbie Flowers, one of the UK's best-known session bass players (David Bowie, Lou Reed, T-Rex, Elton John).

== First recordings ==
Starting his musical career as a London club DJ at the age of 15 (playing disco/soul/funk/electro until a transition to house music in 1986), Summers became a UK recording artist and studio engineer in 1989 with his involvement on the underground rave track "Meltdown" by Quartz. Following a dispute over ownership and royalties of "Meltdown" between Summers and the other two Quartz members, Summers decided to release his own first solo work "Melt Your Body" - which was moderately based upon "Meltdown", made in retaliation by Summers after the dispute. By January 1990, "Melt Your Body" had outsold "Meltdown" by 3:1, it entered the UK top 100 sales chart, and in recognition of this, Summers was firmly established as a promising new UK dance music producer.

Due to big responses from playing his own tracks whilst DJing, Summers signed a two-single deal with Island Records' offshoot urban dance label 4th & Broadway, in May 1990. The first single "Party Children" just missed the UK top 75, whereas the second single "Summers Magic" climbed up the UK chart to peak at number 27, in January 1991. "Summers Magic" gained instant recognition as the first ever dance track to heavily feature a sample of music from a children's TV theme tune, in this case the BBC's The Magic Roundabout.

The hardcore/breakbeat/techno-driven kids' TV sampling phenomenon of "Summers Magic" seemingly provided inspiration for many other artists, including the Prodigy (also from East London/Essex), with their first single "Charly". Before entering the UK national charts, some rave followers believed "Charly" was possibly the work of Mark Summers and his follow-up to "Summers Magic". The Prodigy's track eventually charted in July 1991, almost 7 months following the ground-breaking "Summers Magic". This style of breakbeat hardcore came to be known as "toytown techno". "Summers Magic" was later to appear in the opening of the 2013 comedy film The World's End (starring Simon Pegg), although it does not appear on the soundtrack album. During 1991–93, Summers produced and remixed tracks mainly in the musical styles first labelled as "hardcore" and "jungle", which later morphed itself into the breakbeat-driven music genre now commonly known as "drum and bass".

== Artist productions ==
Summers released six singles on the Hoochie Coochie label (1993–96) with fellow DJs Ben Howard and Dave Malone. During this time, he was hired as a sound engineer to work in the studios of Air Lyndhurst/Chrysalis Music (now Air Studios), co-owned by Beatles producer Sir George Martin. By the end of 1995, Summers had gained an immense sound production status to add to his post-DJ and dance artist qualifications, including recording and production work with notable artists such as Malcolm McLaren, Mica Paris, Jocelyn Brown, Aphex Twin, Ashley Beedle, X-Press 2, Gabrielle and Kylie Minogue, amongst many others.

== Scorccio Records ==
Fully inspired by 1970s disco, '80s hip hop and '90s house music, in 1996 Mark Summers launched his own label, Scorccio Records (pronounced "scor-chee-oh"), with releases that combined elements of those three music genres from the past three decades. The first release was the disco rapped "Inferno" - under Mark's pseudonym Souvlaki. "Inferno" reached top 20 in the UK national chart via the PolyGram offshoot label Wonderboy (coincidentally, it was also their first single release), and "Inferno" also appeared on the 1.5 million-selling Ministry of Sound Annual 2 album mixed by Boy George, becoming a worldwide hit via international licensing. Using the label credit of "Scorccio Remix", the mixing skills and popularity of the "fired-up sound" Mark Summers produced instantly pushed JT Playaz to a UK number 1 dance chart position with "Just Playin", and the follow-up "Let's Get Down". Major label remix work followed, including remixes for Perfecto, Warner Brothers, EMI, Telstar and Universal. Success from the release of over 40 Scorccio tracks and remixes on various dance compilations and singles created a huge fan base for Scorccio, most notably in Japan. Key to success was Mark Summers using up to 10 different pseudonyms for his artist name, one of the most popular and often used being Ultimate Heights. PlayStation 2 and Konami have tracks and remixes by Scorccio featured on their popular Dance Dance Revolution (DDR) console and arcade series of music video games. Dance Dance Revolution Extreme featuring "Highs Off U" by 4 REEEL (produced and mixed by Summers), was the winner of the MTV Video Music Awards in 2005 for Best Video Game Soundtrack.

== SCORCCIO Replays Productions ==
The Scorccio release of "Inferno" in July 1996 originally featured a sample of Dan Hartman's "Relight My Fire", which Summers was told by PolyGram (prior to their release) that the sample either had to be replayed, or that he should pay for the master sample clearance (US$15,000). Avoiding financial loss, Summers decided to replay the sample, the first time he had ever undertaken such a challenge. Summers was determined to make the sample replay as close sounding as possible, and upon first hearing the replayed version PolyGram/Wonderboy believed Summers had simply re-EQ'd the original sample, until he played them all the separate stem parts to prove it had been fully recreated (including a 4-piece string section overdubbed numerous times). Since then, every Scorccio-related release has had replayed and/or revocalled samples.

Quickly establishing the world's first ever 'sample replay' service, in 1996 Mark Summers took his venture into the next stage by working for a large number of major and independent music labels, DJs, producers and recording artists. Ministry of Sound, Defected, Positiva, Universal, Virgin, Sony-BMG (amongst others), soon became regular clients of Scorccio sample replays. In 2004, Positiva released "Lola's Theme" by the Shapeshifters, which featured a Scorccio replay of Johnnie Taylor's "What About My Love". The song went from being hugely popular in clubs to gaining a No. 1 national chart position in the UK, Italy and Germany, followed by a No. 1 spot on the U.S. Hot Airplay Charts. The following year (2005) saw Michael Gray's "The Weekend" reach No. 7 in the UK and No. 1 in Italy, featuring distinctive keyboard riffs played by Summers (initially based upon a re-edited 1980s electro track). Other notable replays have included: "People Hold On", "Blue Monday", "Love to Love You Baby", "Love Sensation", and "One More Time".

In 2009, Summers replayed "Street Player" (originally by Chicago) for the U.S. Billboard No. 2 hit "I Know You Want Me (Calle Ocho)" by Pitbull. The Scorccio replay of "Street Player" has since become the most successful usage of any sample replay in history, due to the number of sales and media plays of the Pitbull song worldwide. With over 400 million hits to date on YouTube, the song is now ranked as the third most viewed electronic dance music video in history.

Another successful sample recreation in September 2010 was produced by Summers for the U.S. Hot Dance 100 No. 1 artist Duck Sauce (DJ's Armand Van Helden, A-Trak), with the song "Barbra Streisand" featuring a Scorccio sample replay of the 1979 Boney M song "Gotta Go Home". The song reached No. 1 in dance charts worldwide.

Summers replayed four samples on the album The Day Is My Enemy by English electronic music group the Prodigy, two decades after both Summers and the Prodigy had first appeared on the UK rave scene. The album was released on 30 March 2015 and immediately charted at number one in the UK, officially certified by the BPI with a gold disc for sales in excess of 200,000 copies. It was released by Three Six Zero Music/Warner Bros. Records in the United States.

2018's "One Last Song" from the album The Thrill of It All by English singer Sam Smith features Mark Summers' recreation of "Be a Lion" on the intro and throughout "One Last Song". The original recording is a track from The Wiz (1978), produced by Quincy Jones and featuring the vocals of both Diana Ross and Michael Jackson.

Summers was guest speaker on panel discussions at the New Music Seminar in New York, June 2015.

By October 2022, Summers had produced over 4,000 sample replays for Scorccio. During the previous years, 4 tracks featuring his production works had reached number 1 on Beatport's Top 100 chart; Fatboy Slim's "Praise You" (Purple Disco Machine Remix), Roberto Surace's "Joys", Matt Sassari's "Put a Record On" and Martin Ikin's "Hooked".

His replay production of vocals and instrumentation from Rick James's 1981 single "Super Freak" featured on Nicki Minaj's "Super Freaky Girl" debuted at number 1 on the U.S. Billboard Hot 100, number 1 on US Hot R&B/Hip-Hop Songs and number 1 on UK Hip Hop/R&B (OCC) during August/September, 2022.

As of January 2026, having achieved over 6,000 replays and productions spanning over 25 years, Mark Summers is now recognised by the music industry as one of the most prolific and most important contributors to dance music throughout the world.

== Discography ==
=== Albums ===
- 2000: Number One - Billie Godfrey (JVC, Japan)
- 2001: Scorccio Super Hit Mix (Toshiba-EMI, Japan)
- 2003: Exotica - Chill-Out Paradise Vol. 1 (Scorccio)
- 2008: Dreamy - Dreemtime (Dreemtime)

=== Singles ===
- 1989: "Melt Your Body" - Mark Summers: (SMR / Hillbilly House, U.S.)
- 1990: "Party Children / Wicked in Mombassa" - Mark Summers: (4th & Broadway)
- 1990: "Bass / Confused About?" - Next Century: (Next Century)
- 1990: "The Force" - 50K: (white label)
- 1991: "Summers Magic" / "5p Like A Micro" - Mark Summers: (4th & Broadway)
- 1991: "Don't Cha Know" - Niteflyte: (Desire)
- 1993: Overdubb EP - Unit-E: (Contagious)
- 1993: "Eruption / Ruffplate" - Overdubb: (Impact)
- 1993: "Take Control" - Interface: (Tuch Wood Records TUCW008)
  - A Wood Side 1. Take Control (Summers/Kris)
  - A Wood Side 2. Take Control (Of the Radio) (Summers/Kris)
  - B Tuch Side 1. Keep It Comin' (Summers/Flippa)
  - B Tuch Side 2. Questions (Summers)
    - B2 features soundbyte samples from Blade Runner's Roy: "Yes... Questions"
  - Published by Chrysalis Music, produced by Mark Summers
- 1994: "Keep It Coming" - Interface: (Tuch Wood)
- 1994: "CityBeats (Bassline Kickin')" - Hoochie Coochie: (Hoochie Coochie)
- 1995: "Make It Right" - Interface: (Slamm)
- 1995: "CityBeats (Bassline Kickin') Remixes" - Hoochie Coochie: (Hoochie Coochie)
- 1995: "Gonna Get Over" - Hoochie Coochie: (Hoochie Coochie)
- 1996: "Make You Move" - Eastbase Boogie Boys: (Hoochie Coochie)
- 1996: "The Business of Booginess" - Disco FX 1 : (Hoochie Coochie)
- 1996: "Inferno" - Souvlaki: (Polygram/Wonderboy)
- 1996: "Just Playin" - JT Playaz : (Telstar)
- 1997: "Friction" - Kornholio : (Scorccio)
- 1997: "Let's Get Down" - JT Playaz : (Telstar)
- 1997: "ADP Groove / Ultra Vibe" - Cappuccino / Kornholio : (Scorccio)
- 1998: "Disco High" - Ultimate Heights : (Scorccio)
- 1998: "My Time" - Souvlaki : (Polygram/Wonderboy)
- 1998: "Sunshine Day" - Freakkout : (Scorccio)
- 1998: "Total Recall" - Ultimate Heights : (Scorccio)
- 1998: "Go Round Again" - Starbeat 2000 : (Scorccio)
- 1998: "Fired Up Sound" - Ultimate Heights : (Scorccio)
- 1999: "Retro Fire" - Maxx 'N Cala : (Scorccio)
- 1999: "The Source" - Scorccio : (Scorccio)
- 1999: "Alright 2 Nite"- Ultimate Heights : (Scorccio)
- 1999: "Good Times" - Mighty High : (Rosenburg)
- 2000: "Highs Off U" - 4 Reeel : (Scorccio)
- 2000: "Drop the Vibe" - Ultimate Heights : (Scorccio)
- 2001: "Pump the Rhythm" - Ultimate Heights : (Scorccio)
- 2002: "Everybody 2 the Sun" - Ultimate Heights : (Scorccio)
- 2002: "U Feel It" - 4 Reeel : (Scorccio)
- 2002: "Jibaro" - ENV : (Scorccio)
- 2003: "What What" - High Five Kings : (Mash Up Recs)
- 2003: "Tonight" - High Five Kings : (Mash Up Recs)
- 2004: "On Fire" - 4 Reeel : (Scorccio)
- 2009: "Hella Good" - Scorccio : (Gallo Recs)
- 2023: "INFERNO" - Schak feat. SCORCCIO : Ministry of Sound

=== Remixes ===
- 1989: "Meltdown" - Quartz : (ITM)
- 1991: "Feel the Music (x3 Mixes)" - Control : (CM)
- 1992: "Protein (Hardcore Innovator Remix)" - Sonic Experience 3: (Strictly Underground)
- 1992: "Classical in Motion" - Excel D : (Brainiak)
- 1993: "Here Again" - DGP : (Tuch Wood)
- 1993: "Whenever I Dream" - Twang Dynasty : (Tuch Wood)
- 1994: "Together We Can Learn" - Awa : (Tuch Wood)
- 1994: "Hacker / Auraya" - Repo : (Tuch Wood)
- 1995: "Generation X" - Kooky Ballerina : (Slamm)
- 1996: "Movin' Up Movin' On" - Mozaic : (Perfecto)
- 1997: "No Stoppin'" - Big Band Experience : (Telstar)
- 1997: "Summerlove" - S-Connection : (Happy One, France)
- 1998: "Gonna Make Ya Move (Don't Stop)" - Pink : (Activ)
- 1998: "That's the Way" - X-Treme : (EMI. Italy)
- 1998: "On the Run" - Known Felons : (Playola)
- 1998: "We Come to Party" - N-Tyce : (Telstar)
- 1998: "Lift Me Up" - Jamestown : (Playola)
- 1999: "Everybody Dance" - X-Rated : (Scorccio)
- 1999: "I Believe" - Jamestown feat Jocelyn Brown : (Playola)
- 1999: "Treat Me Right" - TJ Flayerz : (Playola)
- 2000: "Love Sensation" - Loleatta Holloway : (Toshiba-EMI, Japan)
- 2000: "The Break" - Skybox : (Rosenburg)
- 2000: "Transambient" - Galaxy Beyond : (Addictive TV)
- 2001: "It Only Takes a Minute" - Tavares : (Toshiba-EMI, Japan)
- 2002: "As Long As I Got U" - Unknown : (Z Records)
- 2002: "Living on a Love" - WTP : (Scorccio)
- 2003: "Rhythm Is a Dancer" - Snap : (Ministry of Sound, Germany)

=== Video games ===
Scorccio has two songs which appear in the Dance Dance Revolution arcade series. In addition, the song "Total Recall" was to be included in Dance Dance Revolution 3rdMix Plus, but the song never appeared in the series. It is available in beatmania 5thMix and newer, and in beatmania III, but not in beatmania IIDX.

Song	Arcade game									StepManiaX availability
Song	1st	2nd	3rd	4th	MAX	MAX2	Ex	X3	SMX	StepManiaX availability
"Let's Get Down"	Yes	Yes	Yes	Yes			Yes	Yes		
"Total Recall"			Maybe							
"Highs Off U"					Yes	Yes	Yes			
"Disco High"									Yes	8 October 2021
"Pump The Rhythm"									Yes	10 November 2021
"Everybody 2 The Sun"									Yes	30 December 2021
"Everybody Dance"									Yes	6 February 2022
