= Urban Hype =

English breakbeat hardcore duo

- Origin: Chandler's Ford, Hampshire, England
- Genres: Breakbeat hardcore
- Years active: 1988–2010
- Labels: Pulse-8 (UK); Radikal (US)
- Members: Bob Dibden; Mark Lewis
- Past members: MC Bounce

Urban Hype were an English breakbeat hardcore group. The group was formed in 1988, consisting of Bob Dibden (Robert John Dibden) and Mark Lewis (Mark Louis Chitty). They are best known for their toytown techno single, "A Trip to Trumpton", which peaked at No. 6 in the UK Singles Chart in July 1992. They had two other minor UK chart entries, and briefly saw their second album Conspiracy to Dance released in the United States through Radikal Records.

== Discography ==
=== Albums ===
- Introducing Urban Hype (Pulse-8 Records) (1989)
- Conspiracy to Dance (Pulse-8 Records/Radikal Records) (1992)
- Kealey (Pulse-8 Records) (1995)
- Love Island (Pulse-8 Records) (1998)
- Winning Run (Pulse-8 Records) (2000)
- 2002 (Polydor Records) (2002)
- Singles Collection (Polydor Records) (2004)
- Digital Nation (Polydor Records) (2006)
- Alien Information (Polydor Records) (2008)
- 20 Years of Dancefloor Hits: 1989-2009 (Polydor Records) (2009)

=== Singles ===
- "Adverts" (Faze 2) (1989)
- "Ellie" (Faze 2) (1989)
- "Join the Acid House" (Faze 2) (1989)
- "Alternating of Jerusalem" (Reachin Records) (1989)
- "Last Weekend" (Reachin Records) (1990)
- "Radio Rome" (Faze 2) (1990)
- "Teknologi" (Reachin Records) (1990) - UK No. 94
- Emotion (EP) (Perception Records) (1991)
- "Jingle Bells" (Perception Records) (1991)
- "Sycopath" (Reachin Records) (1991)
- "A Trip to Trumpton" (Faze 2) (1992) - UK No. 6
- "JB2" / "Relapsed" (remix) (Unie Weimer's Essential Cuts) (1992)
- "Relapsed" (remix) (Unie Weimer's Essential Cuts) (1992)
- "The Feeling" (Faze 2) (1992) - UK No. 67
- "Living in a Fantasy" (Faze 2) (1992) - UK No. 57
- "Game of Love" (Faze 2) (1993)
- "EEUU" (Faze 2) (1993)
- "Fields of Your House" (Reachin Records) (1993)
- "Deep Heat High 'N' Risin'" (Faze 2) (1994)
- "Grand Prix" (Faze 2) (1994)
- "I Feel the Heat" (Faze 2) (1994)
- "Donald Where's Your Troosers?" (Faze 2) (1995)
- "Kealey" (Faze 2) (1995)
- "Marigration Over the State of Blind" (Perception Records) (1995)
- "2000" (Reachin Records) (1995)
- "Ghosts & Bruises" (Faze 2) (1996)
- "Bill & Bernie" (Faze 2) (1996)
- "The Official Christmas Megamix" (Reachin Records) (1996)
- "Wash My Skin in My Sink" (Faze 2) (1997)
- "No Sleep till Brooklyn" (Faze 2) (1997)
- "No School till Monday" (Reachin Records) (1998)
- "Sleepover Day" (Faze 2) (1998)
- "Whittle" (Faze 2) (1998)
- "Priority of the Noon" (Perception Records) (1998)
- "Diva Day" (Faze 2) (1999)
- "My Heart Will Go On" (Faze 2) (1999)
- "Night Fever" (Faze 2) (1999)
- "The Official 90s Megamix" (Faze 2) (1999)
- "Welcome to the New Millennium" (Faze 2) (2000)
- "Winning Run" (Faze 2) (2000)
- "Winners Weekend" (Faze 2) (2000)
- "A Trip to Trumpton 2000" (Faze 2) (2000)
- "Warning!" (Polydor Records) (2001)
- "Last Message of Love" (Polydor Records) (2002)
- "Music Scenery" (Polydor Records) (2002)
- "2002" (Polydor Records) (2002)
- "Gravitationary" (Polydor Records) (2002)
- "Time Warp" (Polydor Records) (2003)
- "Blackpool Lights" (Polydor Records) (2003)
- "A Question of Love" (Polydor Records) (2003)
- "Brand New Day" (Polydor Records) (2004)
- "Let's Get Loud" (Polydor Records) (2005)
- "I Quit" (Polydor Records) (2006)
- "Techno Trancing" (Polydor Records) (2006)
- "Sylverington Valley" (Polydor Records) (2006)
- "Digital Nation" (Polydor Records) (2006)
- "Alphabet Station" (Polydor Records) (2007)
- "All the Stars That We Need" (Polydor Records) (2007)
- "Alien Information" (Polydor Records) (2008)
- "No More Mr. Goodbye" (Polydor Records) (2008)
- "One More Day 'Till Christmas" (Polydor Records) (2008)
- "House Arrest" (Polydor Records) (2009)
- "Native of the World" (Polydor Records) (2009)
- "Winter Blunderland" (Polydor Records) (2009)
