= Luna-C =

British DJ and record producer (born 1973)

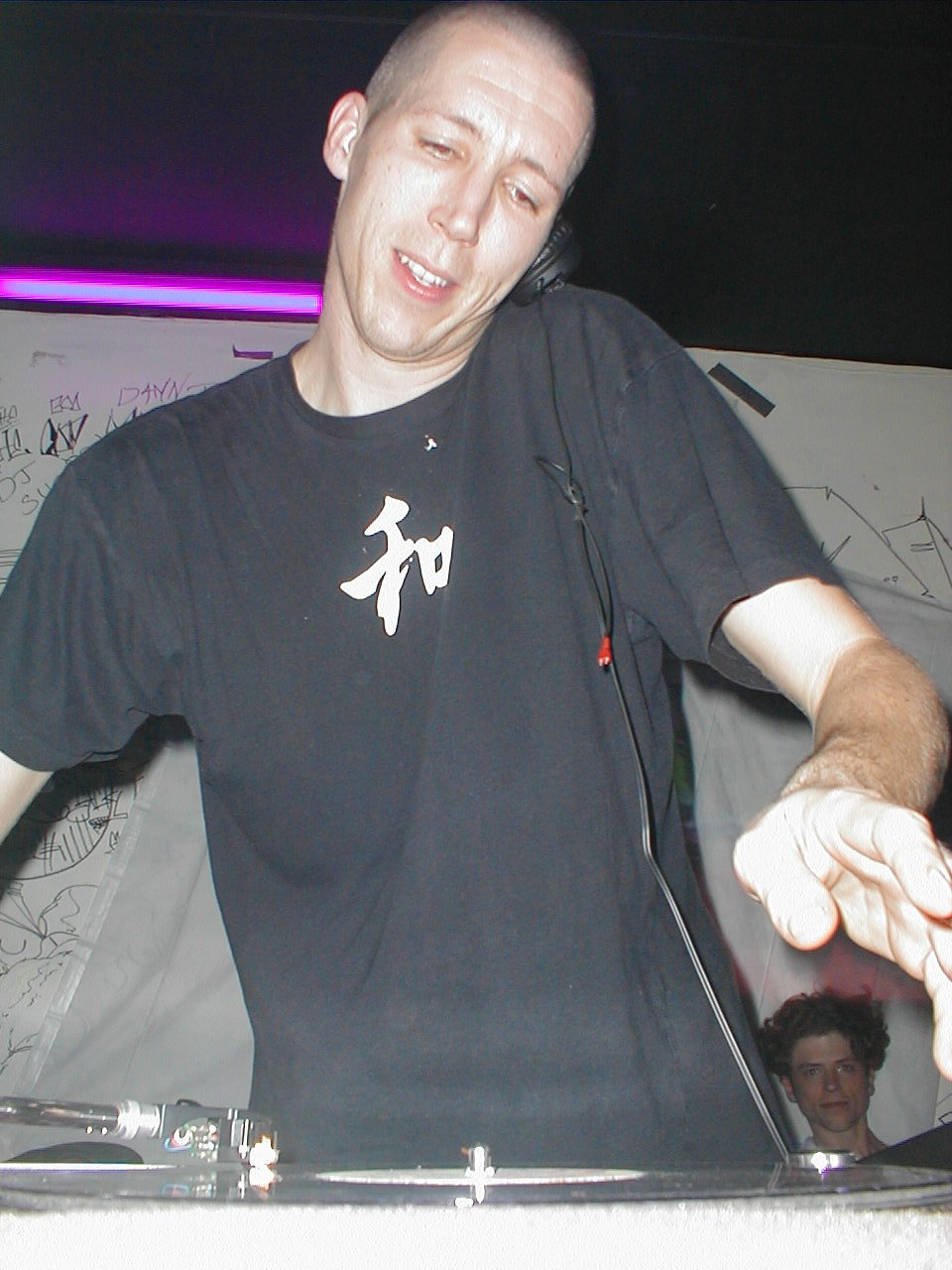
- DJ Luna-C live at Back To The Future; Nashua, NH - 1 December 2001

Background information
- Also known as: Cru-L-T; The Timespan; Eko; Garion Fey; DJ Psycangle
- Born: Christopher Howell; 1 May 1973 (age 53); Isleworth, London, England
- Genres: Breakbeat hardcore; happy hardcore
- Occupations: DJ, producer, label owner
- Years active: 1992–present

Luna-C (born Christopher Howell, 1 May 1973) is a British DJ, record producer, and label owner, known for his work in breakbeat and happy hardcore music. He was a member of the group Smart E's in 1992, who scored a No.2 hit on the UK Singles Chart with "Sesame's Treet". He went on to found the Kniteforce Records label, for which he also produced tracks and remixes under various aliases. This was resurrected in 2001 as Kniteforce Again (KFA) and continues to this day.

== Early life ==
One of Howell's first passions in life was skateboarding. As a youngster, he was a junior champion in a major competition, and he continued to skate as a hobby for many years after. On an early school report, his music teacher said that he had no ear for music and that his exam result of 13% reflected this. He was a huge fan of hip-hop music and DJ'd in his spare time well before he experienced the UK rave scene and hardcore music, having visited Club Labrynth.

He soon began buying hardcore music from Music Power and Boogie Times shops. It was at Boogie Times that he met Tom Orton. Orton helped run a weeknight rave called "Ultimatum" which Howell began DJing at. Talking to the owners of Boogie Times, they decided to make a record purely for fun for its record label Suburban Base.

== Smart E's ==
Howell, Orton, and Orton's friend Nick Arnold (who had a studio) chose the name Smart E's and set about making a tune. Their first single "Bogus Adventure" was released as a promo in 1992 and sold a few hundred copies. Sampling children's programmes became a short-lived but popular source for breakbeat hardcore at this time, and so they decided to sample the theme song from Sesame Street. Entitled "Sesame's Treet", promos were pressed and interest skyrocketed especially when the DJ Steve Jackson played it on London dance radio station Kiss 100. The record crossed over into the mainstream, with demand climbing from 1,000 to 10,000 to 50,000 copies. Upon release, it reached No.2 on the UK singles chart. A worldwide release followed and Smart E's also toured the United States.

The success of "Sesame's Treet" brought media attention to Howell and Smart E's. Many dance music magazines panned the trio as either a joke or opportunists trying to cash in on the rave scene and as novelty records.

== Kniteforce Records ==
Kniteforce Records
- Founded: 1992
- Founder: Christopher Howell
- Genre: Breakbeat hardcore, happy hardcore
- Official website: kniteforcerevolution.com

After commercial success, Howell bought a studio and founded Kniteforce Records in late 1992. The first release in 1993 was The Luna-C Project – Edge of Madness. Kniteforce had a successful period from 1992 to 1995 releasing music from Howell himself, as well as Force and Evolution (whom Darren Styles was a member), Alk-E-D, Future Primitive, and the Trip.

In 1995, Howell formed Remix Records with Dream FM DJ Jimmy J, who owned a shop of the same name in Camden, London. Recording as Cru-L-T, he and Jimmy J found success with tracks such as "Six Days".

To further boost sales, Kniteforce commissioned a series of remixes from big-name DJs including Slipmatt, DJ Sy, Wishdokta, DJ Vibes, and Ramos. The happy hardcore sound shifted in this period, with the use of heavily distorted kick drum riding breakbeats and some of the releases started to reflect this. In 1996, Howell set up Malice Records to cater to the hard-edged gabber sound that was being mixed with UK happy hardcore. Howell also started a sub-label Knitebreed, intended for up-and-coming producers.

Facing financial difficulties, Howell was forced to sell Kniteforce in 1997 to Death Becomes Me, but continued to engineer for the label and releases were still prolific. After hearing a drum and bass track by DJ Aphrodite, Howell started a sub-label called Influential to release a number of 'jump-up' style records.

=== Kniteforce Again (KFA) ===
Howell had fielded requests for represses of the Kniteforce back catalogue, but the original master plates had all been lost when the vinyl pressing plant the label used went bankrupt. In 2001, he launched Kniteforce Again (KFA), with new remixes of both "Six Days" and "Take Me Away" by Jimmy J & Cru-L-T. Many of Kniteforce's original artists also returned to release new material.

By 2003, Howell, split his time between managing the label and DJing at raves in the United States, Canada, Australia, New Zealand, and Europe. In addition to releasing records on KFA, demand for his remixes increased, leading to the album 11 Reasons More.

=== Kniteforce Revolution ===
KFA continues to release some new material from Howell himself, DJ Deluxe, Pete Cannon, Liquid, Acen, Ponder & Entity, Jonny L, and The Criminal Minds. Whilst releasing new material, in recent years, Kniteforce has also been re-issuing remastered classic releases from the likes of Hyper On-Experience, Acen, and Shades of Rhythm.
