= Always Outnumbered, Never Outgunned =

Studio album by the Prodigy
- Released: 11 August 2004
- Recorded: September 1998 – April 2004
- Genres: Big beat; electropunk
- Length: 57:59
- Labels: XL; Maverick
- Producer: Liam Howlett

The Prodigy chronology
The Dirtchamber Sessions Volume One (1999)	Always Outnumbered, Never Outgunned (2004)	Their Law: The Singles 1990–2005 (2005)

Singles from Always Outnumbered, Never Outgunned
- 1. "Girls" Released: 30 August 2004; 2. "Hotride" Released: 1 November 2004; 3. "Spitfire" Released: 4 April 2005

Always Outnumbered, Never Outgunned is the fourth studio album by English electronic music group the Prodigy. It was first released on 11 August 2004 in Japan, on 23 August 2004 in the United Kingdom by XL Recordings, and on 15 September 2004 in the United States by Maverick Records. Recorded almost entirely using Propellerhead Reason and mastered with Pro Tools, the album contrasts with the group's previous releases, and features a larger use of vocals than their previous album The Fat of the Land (1997). Keith Flint and Maxim Reality do not provide any contribution to the official record, which leaves Liam Howlett as the sole band member to do so for the only time in the group's history.

The title is a play on the name of the Walter Mosley novel Always Outnumbered, Always Outgunned. Despite achieving commercial success upon release, the album is among the band's lowest sellers. As a result, XL and Maverick dropped the group after the release of the compilation album Their Law: The Singles 1990–2005.

== Background ==
Following the tour to promote their previous album, Fat of the Land, the group started recording and writing material for their fourth studio album. With the departure of Leeroy Thornhill, the band shut down their official website for over two years, with its home page replaced with a logo of the band and the text "We will be back" set against a black background, leading to rumours that the band went on hiatus. The website was relaunched prior to releasing a new single in 2002.

The single released in that year, and one of the songs intended to be featured on the album was "Baby's Got a Temper". Generating controversy upon release for the lyrics by Keith Flint, which heavily focused on the misuse of the drug rohypnol, the song was met with mostly negative reviews from critics. Liam Howlett has since disowned the song. Despite its apparently low popularity, the song reached the top five of the Canadian Singles Chart and UK Singles Chart. It was intended to be released as a single from the then-upcoming album. Eventually, the group went in another direction, and the plan to include the song on the album was cancelled. Because it was left a non-album single, in 2008, the band's official website's discography classified it as an EP.

== Recording ==
Pre-production was done at Mews Recording Studios, while recording began in September 1998 and ended in April 2004. Unlike their predecessors, which featured contributions from the entire band, with Keith Flint only appearing on the group's third album at the time, Liam Howlett recorded the album mostly by himself in similar vein to Experience (1992), using the Propellerhead Reason program installed on his Macintosh laptop. Moet Mastered, Damian Taylor, and Emily Lazar mastered the album via Pro Tools on the same computer.

Although the production process started in 1998, Howlett disliked the sound of the new album. He initially took a break in 2000, to "go out with my mates and get drunk". He returned to Essex in 2001 to resume work on the record, but after six songs were written, he hired producer Neil McLellan, moving to a house after four months and then returning to the original studio:

My studio is crammed with equipment, but I ended up feeling I was being overcome by it all—it was just too much. I used to go to bed every night thinking 'Tomorrow, I'm going to write the tune. Tomorrow is going to be the day', but nothing ever happened. Eventually Neil McLellan pointed out that we'd been in the studio for four months without having anything to show for it. [...] Nat (his wife and All Saints member) was doing her own record so we weren't spending a lot of time together, but there were always dogs to stroke and videos to watch and gardens to walk 'round, so I didn't ever feel like I was at work—I was too laid-back. [...] Neil [McLellan] said we had to get out, get back to London. I knew I physically couldn't sit in my room any more, and for the first time in my life I listened to someone else and realised I actually needed help. It wasn't that I needed help with the writing, just that I needed help finding the right headspace to get into the right frame of mind. I wanted to write a good album—one I was happy with—but to do that I knew I'd have to jerk myself out of [the] situation I was in and start again.

Howlett purchased and brought a laptop, a copy of the Reason program and selected a "Thermionic Culture Phoenix valve compressor and Culture Vulture distortion unit, a Korg Micro Keyboard, a Manley Laboratories valve EQ and a 1970s Korg MS20 analogue keyboard". He would write the songs in "his bed", and then create them using the equipment. After the recording was finished, Taylor, Mastered and Lazar mixed the album with Pro Tools, completing development on the album.

Of the three members of the Prodigy, only Howlett is present on the album musically. Actress Juliette Lewis, Oasis frontmen Liam and Noel Gallagher, Kool Keith of the Ultramagnetic MCs, who was previously featured on "Diesel Power" from The Fat of the Land, American rapper Twista, Shahin Badar, American hip hop musician Princess Superstar and the Magnificent Ping Pong Bitches were guest musicians on the album. "This album is about reminding people what The Prodigy was always about—the beats and the music", Howlett wrote on a blog of a fansite after finishing the album. He also noted that his intention was to use vocals mostly as an extension of the sound rather than the main focal point, as was the case on The Fat of the Land.

== Composition ==
Always Outnumbered, Never Outgunned is a shift in style that differs from previous releases. Although it was recorded heavily using Propellerhead Reason, the album features contributions from various musicians.

The album opens with "Spitfire", named after and a tribute to the World War II plane of the same name. The song, which features Juliette Lewis on backing vocals, was featured on the soundtrack of the 2005 horror film House of Wax. "Girls" begins with a sample from "Style of the Street" by Broken Glass. When the beats and bass enter, its structure changes from that of an industrial hip hop song to excessive distortion and noise. The vocal samples used in this track are from D. Train song "You're the One for Me". "Memphis Bells" segues from "Girls", and includes Princess Superstar on vocals.

Other tracks include elements unusual for a song from the Prodigy. "Get Up Get Off" features Twista (who co-wrote the song) on lead vocals. "Hotride" (whose music video was rejected by Howlett after completion) interpolates elements from "Up, Up and Away", while "Wake Up Call" was about waking up in the morning and getting "back on tour".

"Medusa's Path" was inspired by "[Damian] Taylor's parents'" trip to Iran. This song is a six-minute instrumental that shares elements from "Elahaye Naz", and samples a remix of a Jaydee song titled "Plastic Dreams". What Howlett called "analogue shit" was the synthesizer that was used for "Phoenix". When "Medusa's Path" segues to this track, the synthesizer enters. The song is accompanied by a repeating sample of the Shocking Blue song "Love Buzz". Following the track is "You'll Be Under My Wheels", the second time Kool Keith collaborated with the band, though his only lyrics are "I rock, I roll." "You'll Be Under My Wheels" would be later used for the soundtrack of the 2005 racing video game Need for Speed: Most Wanted and the film The Fast and the Furious: Tokyo Drift. "The Way It Is", samples Michael Jackson's 1983 single "Thriller", follows, while the album's final track, "Shoot Down", includes a sample from "My World Fell Down", a song performed by Sagittarius. This sample had been used earlier on the unreleased live track "Trigger".

== Promotion ==
"Girls" was released on 30 August 2004 as the lead single from Always Outnumbered, Never Outgunned, entering the UK singles chart at No. 19. "Hotride", released on 1 November 2004 in the United Kingdom, was not eligible to enter the UK charts as the CD was released in extended play format with three additional B-sides, and so did not conform to chart regulations. "Spitfire" was released on 4 April 2005 as the album's third and final single. "Memphis Bells", released on 28 June 2004, was exclusively available online as a digital download via a website promoting the album, in a limited edition of 5,000 copies. Each copy was a combination of customer-chosen instrumental, rhythmic, and melodic options, of which 39,600 choices were available. Five mixes were sold in three file formats, WAV, two audio mixes in MP3, and a 5.1 DTS surround sound mix and all were free of digital rights management. The experiment was a success, with all copies being sold out in over 36 hours, despite server problems from the demand.

== Release ==
Always Outnumbered, Never Outgunned debuted at the top spot on the UK Albums Chart in its first week, and performed well in Australia, reaching number five on the ARIA Album Chart. However, with three singles, the album did not have any major hits worldwide. A limited edition of 5,000 copies of the album was released, sporting a black, inverted cover variant and no other extras. In Japan and the United States, the album contained a reworked version of "Girls", entitled "More Girls", which features Maxim Reality on vocals. It was promoted by a promotional double A-sided 12" vinyl of "Girls" and "Memphis Bells", released in very limited numbers on 21 June 2004, as well as a tour that lasted over two years.

== Reception ==
Professional ratings
Aggregate scores
Source	Rating
Metacritic	53/100
Review scores
Source	Rating
AllMusic	2.5/5 stars
Entertainment Weekly	B−
The Guardian	2/5 stars
Mojo	3/5 stars
The New Zealand Herald	4/5 stars
NME	6/10
Pitchfork	3.9/10
Q	2/5 stars
Rolling Stone	2/5 stars
Spin	B−

The album was released to mixed reviews, despite being commercially successful. At Metacritic, which assigns a normalised rating out of 100 to reviews from mainstream critics, the album received an average score of 53, based on 23 reviews. Drowned in Sound critic Adam Anonymous described the album's overall sound thus: "while Howlett may show his age occasionally throughout Always Outnumbered, Never Outgunned, minus the circus-freak sideshow, all that remains is some very slightly contemporary dance music to get down to." Tim O'Neil of PopMatters felt that the album, while "not bereft of highlights", is nonetheless "the first Prodigy album that does not in some way build of[f] its predecessor, and it suffers". In contrast, Pitchfork, as well as Rolling Stone, Q, The Guardian, AllMusic and several other publications were more critical, stating that the album sounded like an underdeveloped recording.

In February 2012, French electronic duo Justice included it in the NME list of "100 Great Albums You've Never Heard".

== Track listing ==
No.	Title	Writer(s)	Length
1.	"Spitfire"	Liam Howlett	5:07
2.	"Girls"	Howlett; J. Martinez; F. Cooke; Hubert Barclay Eaves III; James Williams	4:06
3.	"Memphis Bells"	Howlett; Neil McLellan	4:28
4.	"Get Up Get Off"	Howlett; Twista^{[v]}; Shahin Badar^{[v]}; Juliette Lewis^{[v]}	4:19
5.	"Hotride"	Howlett; Jimmy Webb; Lewis^{[v]}	4:35
6.	"Wake Up Call"	Howlett; Kool Keith^{[v]}	4:55
7.	"Action Radar"	Howlett; Paul 'Dirtcandy' Jackson^{[v]}	5:32
8.	"Medusa's Path"	Howlett; McLellan	6:10
9.	"Phoenix"	Howlett; Robbie van Leeuwen	4:38
10.	"You'll Be Under My Wheels"	Howlett; McLellan	3:56
11.	"The Way It Is"	Howlett; Rod Temperton	5:45
12.	"Shoot Down" (with Liam Gallagher)	Howlett; McLellan; John Carter; Geoff Stephens; Gallagher	4:32
Total length:			57:59

Japan bonus track
No.	Title	Writer(s)	Length
13.	"More Girls"	Howlett; Barclay Eaves III; Williams; Keith Palmer	4:27

South Korean bonus disc
No.	Title	Writer(s)	Length
1.	"More Girls"	Howlett; Barclay Eaves III; Williams; Palmer	4:28
2.	"Who U Foolin"	Howlett; J. Martinez; F. Cooke; Barclay Eaves III; Williams	3:40
3.	"Hotride" (El Batori Mix)	Howlett; Webb; Lewis^{[v]}	4:43
4.	"Spitfire" (Future Funk Squad's 'Dogfight' Remix)	Howlett	7:25

Sample credits

- "Girls" contains elements from "Style of the Street" performed by Broken Glass licensed courtesy of Abyss Music Ltd. Written by J. Martinez/F. Cooke, published by Abyss Music Ltd, and elements from "You're the One for Me" written by Hubert Barlay Eaves III/James Williams, published by Zella Music (BMI) and Blue Image Music (PRO) (and as administrator for Diesel Music (BMI)), both divisions of Unidisc Music Inc.
- "Hot Ride" contains elements from "Up Up and Away" written and composed by Jim Webb. Published by EMI Sosaha Music Inc/Jonathan Three Music Co.
- "Medusa's Path" contains elements from "Elahaye Naz" composed by Rooholah Khaleghi and performed by Gholamhossein Banan, the copyright in the composition and sound recording of which is owned by Iran Seda Art and Cultural Company. This title includes a sample of "Plastic Dreams (Hohner Retro Mix)" performed by Jaydee licensed courtesy of Antler-Subway Records, division EMI Music BV. Written by Robin Albers, published by TBM Publishing/EMI Music Publishing Holland BV.
- "Phoenix" contains elements from "Love Buzz" performed by Shocking Blue licensed courtesy of Red Bullet Productions BV written by Robert van Leeuwen and published by Nada Music BV.
- "The Way It Is" based upon "Thriller" written by Rod Temperton and published by Rodsongs/Almo Music Corp (ASCAP).
- "Shoot Down" contains elements from "My World Fell Down" performed by Sagittarius under licence from Sony Music. Written by John Carter/Geoff Stephens. Published by Carter-Lewis Music Pub. Co. Ltd.

Notes

- ^{^[v]} signifies vocals written by
- "You'll Be Under My Wheels" is stylised as "You'll Be UNDER MY WHEELS".

== Personnel ==
The Prodigy

- Liam Howlett – production, programming, keyboards, synthesizers, sampling, guitar, bass guitar, engineering, mixing
- Maxim Reality – vocals on "Spitfire" and "More Girls"
- Keith Flint – vocals on "Hotride" (El Batori Mix)

Additional musicians, co-producers and engineers

- Neil McLellan – co-production, additional programming, engineering, mixing
- Damian Taylor – Pro Tools engineer
- Matt Robertson – additional programming, "stab creation" on "Spitfire", guitar on "Phoenix", "recreation work" on "The Way It Is"
- Juliette Lewis – vocals on "Hotride", "Spitfire" and "Get Up Get Off"
- Natalie Appleton – additional vocals on "Spitfire"
- Ping Pong Bitches – vocals on "Girls"
- Princess Superstar – vocals on "Memphis Bells"
- Twista – vocals on "Get Up Get Off"
- Shahin Badar – vocals on "Get Up Get Off"
- David Pemberton – additional production on "Get Up Get Off"
- Kool Keith – vocals on "Wake Up Call" and "You'll Be Under My Wheels"
- Hannah Robinson – additional vocals on "Hotride" and "Wake Up Call"
- Scott Donaldson – guitar on "Hotride"
- Louise Boone – additional vocals on "Wake Up Call", "Action Radar", "Phoenix", "The Way It Is"
- Jim Hunt – flute on "Wake Up Call"
- Paul "Dirtcandy" Jackson – vocals on "Action Radar"
- Mike Horner – guitar on "Action Radar" and "Shoot Down"
- Jim Davies – guitar on "You'll Be Under My Wheels"
- Rinse – "recreation work" on "The Way It Is"
- Liam Gallagher – vocals on "Shoot Down"
- Noel Gallagher – bass guitar on "Shoot Down"
- Jan "Stan" Kybert – additional production on "Shoot Down"
- Emily Lazar – mastering (at The Lodge)
- House & Cook – sleeve artwork

== Charts ==
=== Weekly charts ===
Chart (2004)	Peak position
Australian Albums (ARIA)	5
Austrian Albums (Ö3 Austria)	8
Belgian Albums (Ultratop Flanders)	8
Belgian Albums (Ultratop Wallonia)	16
Danish Albums (Hitlisten)	20
Dutch Albums (Album Top 100)	4
Finnish Albums (Suomen virallinen lista)	7
French Albums (SNEP)	17
German Albums (Offizielle Top 100)	6
Hungarian Albums (MAHASZ)	15
Irish Albums (IRMA)	3
Italian Albums (FIMI)	6
New Zealand Albums (RMNZ)	20
Norwegian Albums (VG-lista)	5
Scottish Albums (Official Charts)	3
Spanish Albums (PROMUSICAE)	10
Swedish Albums (Sverigetopplistan)	34
Swiss Albums (Schweizer Hitparade)	3
UK Albums (Official Charts)	1
US Billboard 200	62
US Top Dance Albums (Billboard)	1

Weekly chart performance
Chart (2026)	Peak position
Croatian International Albums (HDU)	32

=== Year-end charts ===
Year-end chart performance for Always Outnumbered, Never Outgunned
Chart (2004)	Position
UK Albums (OCC)	108

== Certifications ==
Region	Certification	Certified units/sales
United Kingdom (BPI)	Gold	100,000^{^}
^{^} Shipments figures based on certification alone.
