= Baby's Got a Temper =

2002 single by the Prodigy

Single by the Prodigy
- Released: 1 July 2002
- Recorded: Essex, England
- Length: 4:27
- Label: XL
- Songwriters: Liam Howlett; Keith Flint; Kieron Pepper; Tony Howlett
- Producer: Liam Howlett

The Prodigy singles chronology
"Smack My Bitch Up" (1997)	"Baby's Got a Temper" (2002)	"Girls" (2004)

"Baby's Got a Temper" is a song by English electronic dance music group the Prodigy, released as a non-album single on 1 July 2002 by the record labels XL worldwide and Maverick in the United States. It was the band's first single in five years after 1997's "Smack My Bitch Up", and was also their first release after dancer Leeroy Thornhill left the band in 2000.

The single, as well as the accompanying music video, was controversial, and was met with a negative response from critics. The song's lyrics, written by Keith Flint, were criticised in particular for heavily playing upon the misuse of the "date rape" drug Rohypnol. Liam Howlett later disowned the single. Despite this criticism, the song was a top-five hit on the Canadian and UK Singles Charts.

== Recording and composition ==
The song was written by Keith Flint when he was in Flint, a side project of the Prodigy. Flint performed several gigs, with their first being a brief set at the Download Festival on 1 June 2003. Having thought that the band were in the industrial metal genre, Flint decided that the song would largely contrast with the band's style, and invited Jim Davies to be featured in the song. Liam Howlett, the song's producer, would later argue he disowned the single. The original demo, "NNNN (No Name No Number)", was released as a hidden track on Flint's promo album Device #1.

"Baby's Got a Temper" briefly samples the Prodigy's earlier hit "Firestarter", while its tempo is set in 100 BPM. The band generated controversy by including references to the so-called "date rape" drug Rohypnol in the lyrics; however, they explained that the song mentions only personal use and makes no statements on drugging others. Howlett later described the song as "too introverted", as it focuses on Flint's personal experiences with the drug.

== Release and reception ==
The single was initially intended to support their then-upcoming album, Always Outnumbered, Never Outgunned. However, the album got reworked and the song was removed from its track listing. Because of the song's release as a non-album single, in 2008, the band's official website's discography classified it as an EP.

Many critics disliked "Baby's Got a Temper" when released. PopMatters wrote that the song "doesn’t sound like a great leap forward from the last Flint-fronted tracks, and that's a big disappointment considering that we've been waiting five years for it." In addition, NME panned the song, and called the Prodigy "just total fucking idiots" while unfavorably comparing it to glue. The song was banned from radio stations in the UK due to "glamorising" Rohypnol. BBC Radio 1 thought that the record would be "too strong to stomach".

Despite negative reviews, it was a commercial success, with the single being a top-five hit on the Canadian Singles Chart and the UK Singles Chart.

== Music video ==
A Traktor-directed music video for the song was released as a DVD single that included a short "making of" film. It featured three ordinary men, dressed in suits, who walk into a disused funfair. They enter a makeup trailer, dress up and apply makeup, walk out to a stage where they turn out to be the band members, Howlett, Flint, and Maxim. The three perform before a crowd consisting of cattle, which are milked by women strippers. The milk is then passed to a booth and sold to the public waiting outside who is desperate to get some in an addict manner. The video was apparently based upon one of Howlett's dreams.

The video was shot in June 2002 in Kladno, Czech Republic (around 50.151°N 14.124°E). There are many Czechoslovak communist era properties—the car in the opening scene is the last model Škoda 120 L, the time clock is classical Elektročas model and the carousels include flying (hydraulic arm) swans made in Bílovice.

== Track listings ==
UK CD and 12-inch single, Australian CD single

1. "Baby's Got a Temper" (main mix)
2. "Baby's Got a Temper" (dub)
3. "Baby's Got a Temper" (instrumental)

UK and US DVD single

1. "Baby's Got a Temper" (video)
2. "A Day at Work"

European CD single

1. "Baby's Got a Temper" (main mix)
2. "Baby's Got a Temper" (dub)

US CD single

1. "Baby's Got a Temper" (original version)
2. "Baby's Got a Temper" (instrumental)

US maxi-CD and 12-inch single

1. "Baby's Got a Temper" (original version)
2. "Baby's Got a Temper" (dub mix)
3. "Baby's Got a Temper" (instrumental)
4. "Baby's Got a Temper" (a cappella)

Australian DVD single

1. "Baby's Got a Temper" (video)
2. DVD interface
3. "A Day at Work"

== Charts ==
=== Weekly charts ===
Weekly chart performance for "Baby's Got a Temper"
Chart (2002)	Peak position
Australia (ARIA)	36
Austria (Ö3 Austria Top 40)	35
Belgium (Ultratip Bubbling Under Flanders)	16
Belgium (Ultratip Bubbling Under Wallonia)	15
Canada (Nielsen SoundScan)	5
Denmark (Tracklisten)	13
Europe (Eurochart Hot 100)	18
Finland (Suomen virallinen lista)	7
France (SNEP)	73
Germany (GfK)	37
Greece (IFPI)	3
Hungary (Single Top 40)	4
Ireland (IRMA)	14
Ireland Dance (IRMA)	2
Italy (FIMI)	18
Netherlands (Dutch Top 40)	40
Netherlands (Single Top 100)	39
New Zealand (Recorded Music NZ)	50
Norway (VG-lista)	13
Scottish Singles Sales (Official Charts)	9
Spain (Promusicae)	3
Sweden (Sverigetopplistan)	33
Switzerland (Schweizer Hitparade)	31
UK Singles (Official Charts)	5
UK Dance (Official Charts)	4
UK Indie (Official Charts)	2
US Dance Singles Sales (Billboard)	7

=== Year-end charts ===
Year-end chart performance for "Baby's Got a Temper"
Chart (2002)	Position
Canada (Nielsen SoundScan)	52
Spain (PROMUSICAE)	17
UK Singles (OCC)	198

== Release history ==
Release dates and formats for "Baby's Got a Temper"
Region	Date	Format(s)	Label(s)	Ref.
United States	3 June 2002	Active rock; alternative radio	Maverick	
United Kingdom	1 July 2002	12-inch vinyl; CD	XL	
Australia	15 July 2002	CD	XL	
Australia	12 August 2002	12-inch vinyl	XL	
Australia	2 September 2002	DVD	XL	
