= Ping Pong Bitches =

English electroclash band

The Ping Pong Bitches
- Also known as: The Magnificent Ping Pong Bitches
- Origin: London, England
- Genres: Alternative rock, electroclash
- Years active: 2000–present
- Labels: Poptones, Umami Records
- Members: Emily Hell; Louise Prey; Danny Noise; Sister Hell
- Past members: Mandy Wong
- Website: pingpongbitches.com

The Ping Pong Bitches (a name given to them by their ex-boyfriends) is an all female electroclash band from London, England, who formed in 2000. Fronted by Emily Hell, Mandy Wong and Louise Prey, they released their self-titled debut EP in 2000 on Alan McGee's Poptones label. It featured former Sex Pistols guitarist Steve Jones and Roxy Music's Phil Manzanera on guitars.

In 2004, Ping Pong Bitches guested on The Prodigy's "Girls", from their Always Outnumbered, Never Outgunned album and then put together a full band, adding Danny Noise (guitars & production), Sister Hell (keyboards) and Ol Brown (decks & co-production) to the line-up.

Their first new single "Roc Ya Body" was released on 30 October 2006 and the CD single included a video as well as a club remix by 'Punx Soundcheck'. The limited DJ promo (on 12" vinyl) features an extra remix by McSleazy. "Roc Ya Body" was inspired by Louise Prey's illicit lust for a teenage boy she met on a coach to Manchester.

Their debut album Alphadog was released on Umami Records in early 2007, preceded by the single "The Beast". It includes new versions of some the songs on the first EP. Their album received generally extremely negative reviews, Chris Ingold of Musicomh warned "Approach with extreme caution - the Ping Pong Bitches could have a negative effect on your sanity."

== Discography ==
- Ping Pong Bitches EP, 2000
1. "Beat You Up" (features an interpolation of the backing from Donna Summer's "I Feel Love")
2. "I Love You Necrophiliac"
3. "Rock Action" (With Steve Jones)
4. "Dynamite"
5. "Chinese Song" (with Phil Manzanera)
- Alphadog - released 19 February 2007
1. "Alphadog"
2. "Roc Ya Body"
3. "The Beast"
4. "Kinky Boots"
5. "Rock Action"
6. "Chains"
7. "Krazyfaze"
8. "Glitchfunk TV"
9. "Beat You Up"
10. "Bedsitter"
11. "Superfine"
12. "Gatecrasher"
13. "Fallen Stars Radio"

The versions of "Rock Action" and "Beat You Up" featured on this recording are different recordings and arrangements to the original versions featured on the self-titled 2000 EP. In particular "Beat You Up" does not have the Donna Summer interpolation in the background.
