= Keith Flint =

English dancer and singer (1969–2019)

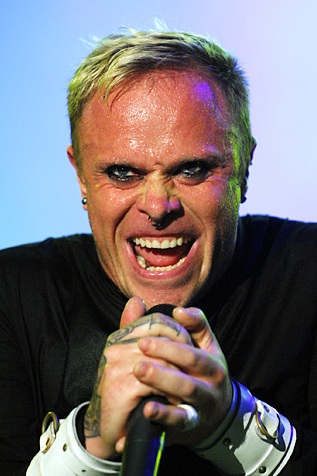
- Flint in 2007

Background information
- Born: Keith Charles Flint; 17 September 1969; Redbridge, London, England
- Died: 4 March 2019 (aged 49) North End, Essex, England
- Genres: Dance; techno; punk rock
- Occupations: Singer; dancer; hype man; motorcycle racer
- Years active: 1990–2019
- Formerly of: The Prodigy; Flint
- Spouse: Mayumi Kai (m. 2006)
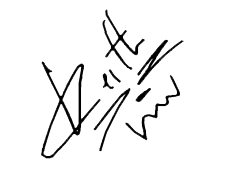

Keith Charles Flint (17 September 1969 – 4 March 2019) was an English dancer, and vocalist of the electronic dance act the Prodigy. Starting out as a dancer for the group, he became the vocalist and performed on the group's two UK number-one singles, "Firestarter" and "Breathe", both released in 1996. He was also the singer of his own band, Flint.

Flint owned a motorcycle racing team, Team Traction Control, which won four Isle of Man TT races in 2015 and 2016, and competed in the British Superbike Championship.

== Early life ==
Keith Charles Flint was born in Goodmayes, an area in Ilford, in East London, to Clive and Yvonne Flint, on 17 September 1969. Clive Flint worked as an engineering consultant. Keith Flint was initially raised in East London, but in the mid-1970s his parents moved out to a quiet suburban cul-de-sac in Springfield, in Chelmsford, Essex. His childhood was described as unhappy, and he feuded with his parents, who separated when he was young. He attended the Boswells School in Chelmsford and moved to Braintree after leaving school. Flint was described as being a "bright boy with dyslexia" and was disruptive in class. He was expelled from school at the age of 15. Flint then worked as a roofer and later enthusiastically embraced the acid house scene of the late 1980s. Musically, Flint was a childhood fan of the Jam, and in the late 1980s he listened to bands like Siouxsie and the Banshees.

In 1989, he appeared as the boy running in the music video for the new beat act 101's video for "Just as Long as I Got You".

== Music career ==
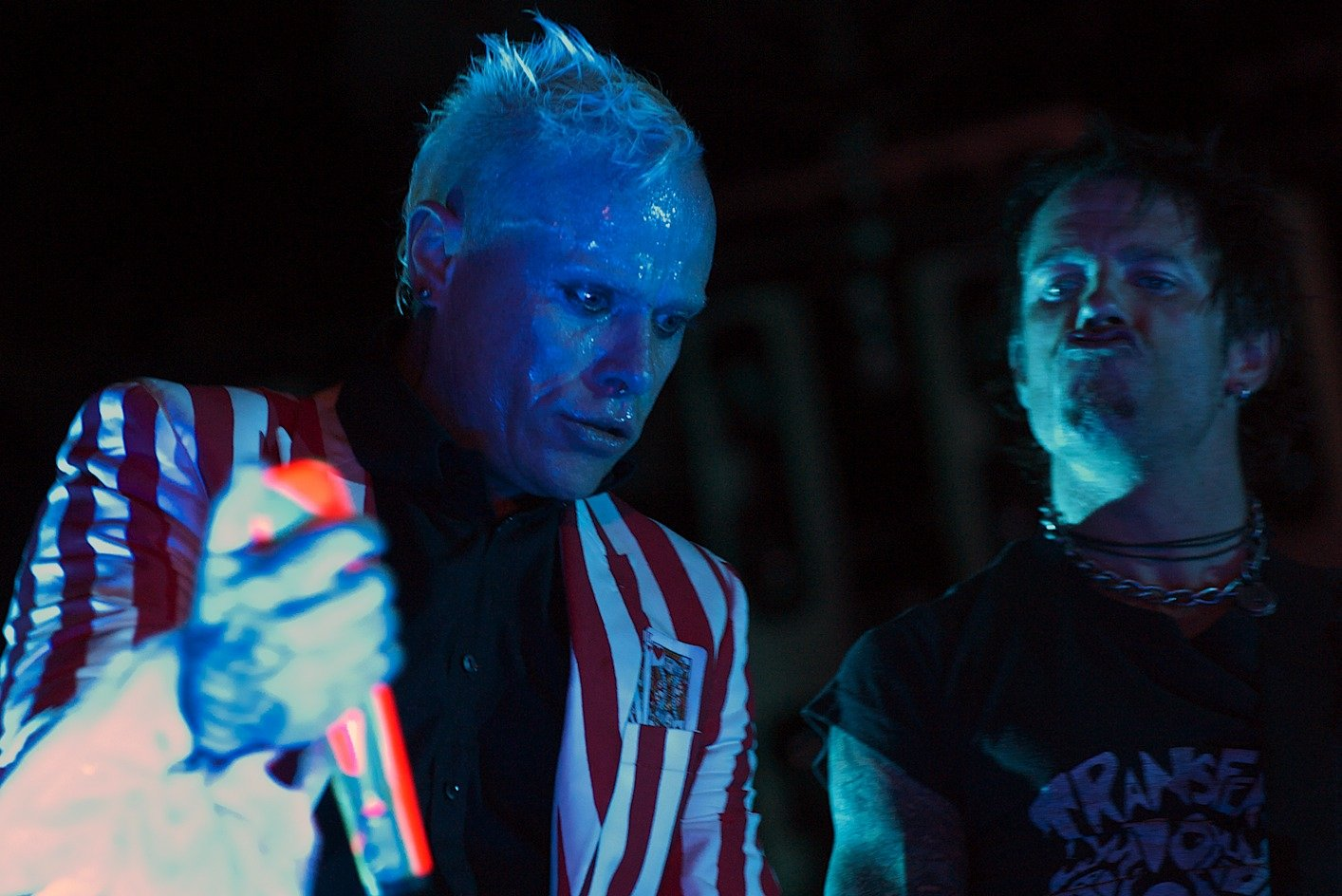
Flint with Prodigy guitarist Rob Holliday

Flint met DJ Liam Howlett at local rave club the Barn in Braintree, and said he liked Howlett's taste in music. After receiving a mixtape from Howlett, Flint came back with great enthusiasm, insisting that Howlett should be playing his tracks up on stage and that Flint, along with friend Leeroy Thornhill, would dance to them. Flint, Howlett and Thornhill were joined by MC Maxim Reality and became the successful electronic dance act the Prodigy.

In 1996, Flint moved from being a dancer for the group to being its frontman when he sang on the hit single "Firestarter"; the accompanying video showcased Flint's new and soon-to-be iconic punk look. This trend continued with the next Prodigy single, "Breathe", on which Flint sang vocals, with Maxim backing him up.

The 1997 album The Fat of the Land also featured Flint's vocal contributions on the tracks "Serial Thrilla" and "Fuel My Fire". In 2002, the non-album single "Baby's Got a Temper" was released, which was written by Flint.

Flint did not perform vocals on the next Prodigy album—Always Outnumbered, Never Outgunned (2004)—but reappeared on the "Hotride (El Batori Mix)", included on the "Hotride" single.

The Prodigy album Invaders Must Die was released on 23 February 2009 and featured vocals by Flint on multiple tracks. Flint released a single titled "War" with dubstep artist Caspa in 2012.

Flint experimented with solo projects, including his punk rock band Flint, which included remixes by Steven "Stitch" Held at The Recovery Room and Clever Brains Fryin'. Flint's debut album, Device #1, was cancelled before its release, leaving "Aim4" as their only single to be commercially released.

== Motorcycle racing ==
Flint was a keen motorcyclist. He rode 2,400 kilometres (1,500 mi) from England to southern Spain to attend the 2007 Spanish motorcycle Grand Prix and also raced in club competitions. He rode with Lee Thompson of the band Madness. He had his own motorcycle team, Team Traction Control, which competed in the British Supersport Championship as part of the British Superbike Championship before stepping up to the British Superbike Championship in 2017. In 2015, Team Traction Control machines won two Isle of Man TT races, ridden by Ian Hutchinson. The team and Ian Hutchinson repeated their two victories again in 2016.

== Personal life ==
Flint dated television personality Gail Porter; the couple split in 2001.

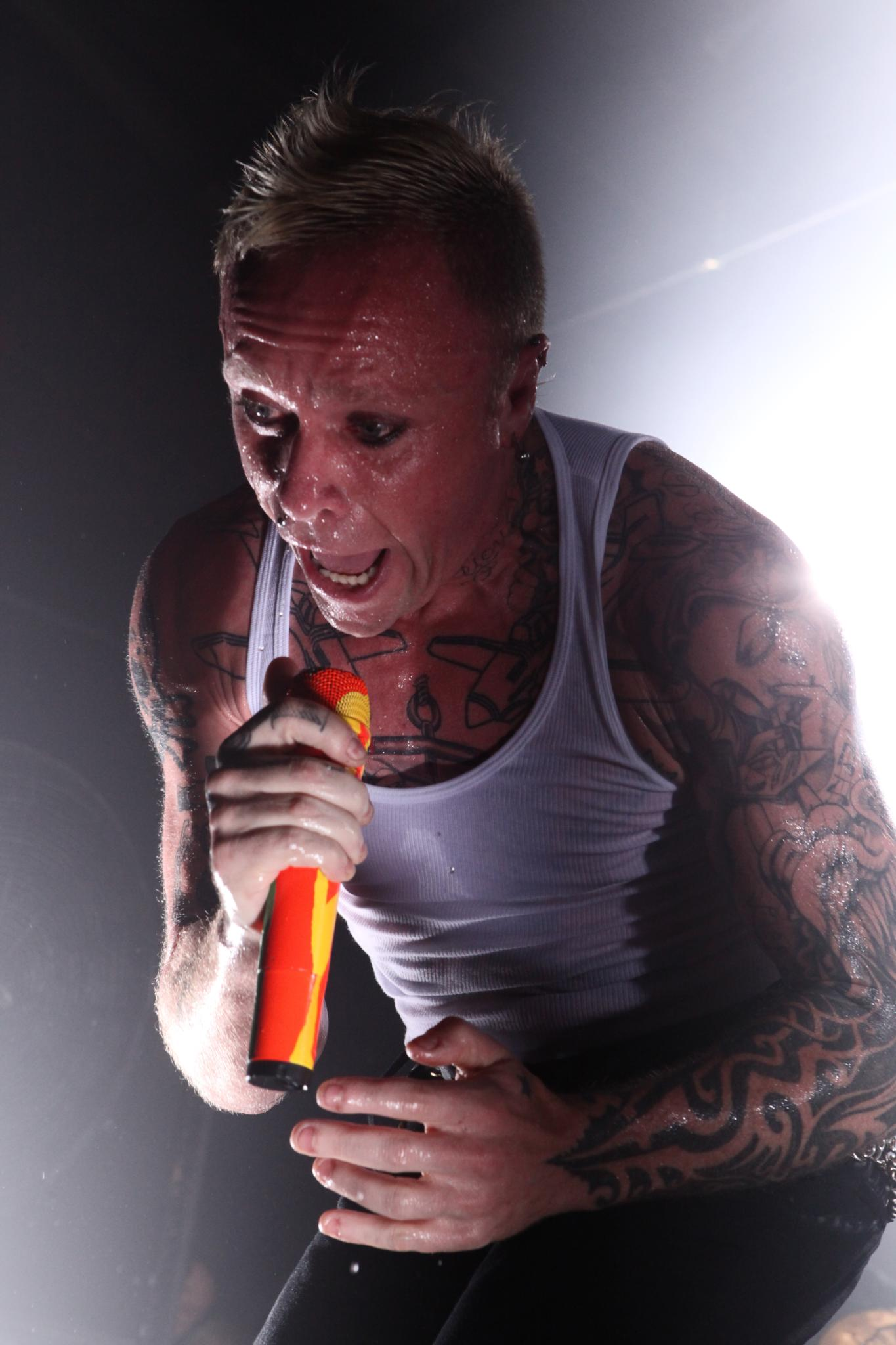
Flint in 2009

In 2006, Flint married Mayumi Kai. The couple were separated at the time of Flint's death.

Flint had a tattoo across his stomach of the word "Inflicted", a reference to a lyric in "Firestarter". Flint was difficult on transatlantic flights; on one occasion he had to be restrained from kicking down the door to the cockpit. Prior to his marriage, Flint suffered from depression and an addiction to prescription painkillers. Flint kept fit by boxing and practising Brazilian jiu-jitsu.

In 2014, he bought and renovated the Leather Bottle pub in Pleshey, Essex, and became a popular landlord. Flint kept a jar in which customers were required to put a pound if they made a "Firestarter" joke as he lit the pub's fire. He ended his connection with the pub without explanation in 2017.

Flint lived in a listed Tudor manor house near Dunmow, Essex. He had a small flat track in his back garden, where he rode some of his motorcycles. Flint was a lover of animals and was an enthusiastic birder; he built a pond in his garden to attract birds and kept several dogs and horses at his home.

He also enjoyed the countryside.

== Death ==
On 4 March 2019, Essex Police were called to Flint's home in North End, in response to concerns for his welfare. Flint was found hanging and was pronounced dead at the scene, aged 49. The police did not treat the death as suspicious. That day, bandmate Liam Howlett stated in an Instagram post that Flint "took his own life". Flint's funeral was held on 28 March 2019. At an 11 March 2019 inquest into his death, it was announced that he had died as a result of suicide by hanging. But, another coroner's inquest on 9 May 2019 determined there was not sufficient evidence for a suicide verdict. Cocaine, alcohol, and codeine were found in his system at the time of his death.

== Legacy ==
After Flint's death, fans used the hashtag "#Firestarter4Number1" on social media in a campaign to try to get the song "Firestarter" to No. 1 on the UK singles chart as a mark of respect for Flint and to raise awareness for male suicide in the UK. The song reached the chart's 58th place the following week.

Following his death, many musical artists and music industry figures from around the world paid tribute to Flint. Many tributes highlighted Flint's gentle temperament, illustrating a personal kindness, politeness and generosity that contrasted with his energetic and sometimes aggressive stage persona. Fellow British musician and Jamiroquai frontman Jay Kay said, "What bloody tragic news. What a top fella and a great laugh. I hope they've got a quick bike for him up there.. cos he fucking sure knew how to ride one. Keith Flint... always 'balls to the wall'."

In June 2019, fashion designer Donatella Versace dedicated her spring/summer 2020 menswear show in Milan to Flint's memory. Versace, who was a friend of Flint's, dressed male models in clothing reflecting his style and they sported Flint's distinctive "Firestarter" hairstyle.

Whilst performing at Glastonbury Festival in June 2019, Liam Gallagher dedicated "Champagne Supernova" to Flint.

In the 2020 video game Assassin's Creed Valhalla, a bard named Keith resembling Flint can be found in Essex, England, as part of a sidequest titled "The Prodigy". There, the "Bishop of the Ruins" is denouncing his music as unholy. The character says the presence of the player character, Eivor, is "surely an omen", referencing the Prodigy's song "Omen"; when the protesting clergyman starts a fistfight with Eivor, Keith encourages the character to "Smack my Bishop", a reference to the song "Smack My Bitch Up". Kristen McGorry, a writer on the game, confirmed on Twitter that these and other references were intentional tributes to Flint and the band.

On 5 August 2021, a Crowdfunder campaign was launched by music and mental wellbeing festival "Headstock" to commission street artist Akse P19 to paint a mural of Flint. The mural, which was unveiled on 9 September 2021, a day ahead of World Suicide Prevention Day, is located at Beechwood Road in Hackney, near to where the Prodigy played their first gig at the Four Aces Club in 1990.

In March 2026, a memorial bench was placed outside the St Mary's Church in Bocking, Essex. The bench attracted criticism because of its devil-horned backrest design which was meant to represent Flint's hairstyle.

== Discography ==
=== With the Prodigy ===
- Experience (1992) (Credited but no recorded contributions)
- Music for the Jilted Generation (1994) (Credited but no recorded contributions)
- The Fat of the Land (1997)
- Always Outnumbered, Never Outgunned (2004) (Credited but no recorded contributions)
- Their Law: The Singles 1990–2005 (2005)
- Invaders Must Die (2009)
- World's on Fire (2011)
- The Day Is My Enemy (2015)
- No Tourists (2018)

=== With Flint ===
- Device#1 (2003) (Only released in promo form)
