= Laila (album) =

Studio album by Shahin Badar
- Released: 5 October 2008 (digital download); 13 October 2010 (CD)
- Genre: Electronic
- Length: 77:41
- Language: English; Hindi; Punjabi; Urdu; Arabic; Bengali
- Label: Imprint

Shahin Badar chronology
Destiny (1996)	Laila (2008)

Laila is the second studio album by English singer Shahin Badar, released on 5 October 2008 by Imprint Records.

== Composition ==
The album features a blend of Arabic, English and Indian influences.

== Critical response ==
Indi of DESIblitz said, Laila "features 18 tracks with edgy, tripping and hypnotic beats and chants." Manchester Evening News said "It is a strong offering of 18 solid cuts, which are edgy, tripping and hypnotic beats and chants." Punjab 2000 said "While this album won't set the music world alight, it should be recognised as the mark of an artist with a few tricks up her sleeve."

== Track listing ==
No.	Title	Language(s)	Length
1.	"Laila"	Hindi	4:11
2.	"Mundaya"	Punjabi	3:20
3.	"Distortion"	Hindi	3:20
4.	"Andheri Raat"	Hindi	5:00
5.	"Doleh Reh"	Hindi	4:42
6.	"Jhoom Jhoom"	Urdu	5:35
7.	"Queen of Punjab"	Punjab	6:28
8.	"Soriya Veh"	Punjab	4:10
9.	"Yeh Rog"	Hindi	4:24
10.	"Bangladesh"	Bengali	3:54
11.	"Diggin"	English	3:29
12.	"Nababana"	English, Hindi	3:24
13.	"Baby's So Good to Me"	English	3:21
14.	"Jaan Eh Jah"	English, Punjabi	3:42
15.	"Yeh Rog" (featuring Stock)	Hindi, English	4:01
16.	"Laila" (featuring Mohammed Hammam)	Hindi	4:24
17.	"Light at the End of the Tunnel"	Hindi	4:07
18.	"Dharti"	Hindi, Punjabi	6:09
Total length:			77:41
