= Flint (band) =

British punk rock band

- Genres: Punk rock
- Years active: 2003
- Spinoff of: The Prodigy
- Past members: Keith Flint; Jim Davies; Kieron Pepper; Rob Holliday; Tony Howlett

Flint were a British punk rock band created by Keith Flint of the Prodigy. The band consisted of Keith Flint (lead vocals), Jim Davies (guitar, formerly of Pitchshifter), Kieron Pepper (live drums), Rob Holliday (bass guitar), and Tony Howlett (drums).

The band performed several gigs, their first being a brief set at the inaugural Download Festival 2003 (1 June). The first release "Asteroids" was released on 19 May 2003 and was a pink, limited edition 10" single available on vinyl. The second single titled "Aim 4" was released on 14 July 2003. The video for the second single was directed by Jonas Åkerlund, who also directed The Prodigy's "Smack My Bitch Up" video. The video featured Claire Dyer on bass, a Nottingham musician who stepped in at the request of Keith when Rob was unavailable. Following the release of "Aim 4" the band planned to release their debut album Device #1 on 28 July 2003; however, this release was cancelled. Shortly after its cancellation, the band decided to split up. Keith then went on to form a project titled Clever Brains Fryin' while Davies went on to form Victory Pill.

Flint remixed Marilyn Manson's mOBSCENE, with Keith providing new vocals. The following text, dated 21 April 2003, was found from the official Marilyn Manson pages: "Pay attention! In London, we vandalized a Versace billboard with two gigantic Marilyn Mice and had an amazing crowd sing along to the three piano numbers. Keith Flint (The Prodigy) presented me with his new band's remix of Mobscene on which he sings. We discussed illegal behavior, participated in illegal behavior and became the best of friends over a bottle of Absinthe."

== Discography ==
=== Albums ===
- Device #1 (2003) – Aborted

The album was originally planned to contain 13 punk rock genre tracks, but plans for that were cancelled. On 28 July, a Device #1 Promo disc was released in limited edition around the UK. Contained 11 tracks:

1. Asteroids (03:09)
2. Piggy (03:09)
3. Laughs (03:30)
4. Aim 4 (02:58)
5. Kamikaze (04:26)
6. Prescription (03:30)
7. Ju Ju (03:32)
8. Femme Fatale (03:11)
9. Vacation (03:28)
10. Razor (03:49)
11. NNNN (No Name No Number) (04:16) – hidden track

The full disc's content would go like this, plus two other tracks "Hell, Yeah" and "Inflow".

The promo album was distributed by Polydor.

=== Singles ===
- "Asteroids" – single-sided pink vinyl limited to 2000 copies

The disc released on 19 May 2003 and only contained "Asteroids" (03:09).

- "Aim 4"

Released with the Device #1 Promo, on 28 July 2003.

1. "Aim 4" (02:58)
2. "Danny" (02:40)
3. "Asteroids" (03:09)
4. "Aim 4" (Video)

The song "Aim 4" was used in the opening titles for the German version of the anime Hellsing, and the song "Laughs" was used during the end credits.
