= Shahin Badar =

English singer-songwriter (born 1974)

- Born: 17 June 1974 (age 52); Colchester, Essex, England
- Origin: Gants Hill, Ilford, Redbridge, London, England
- Genres: Pop; electronic; trance; Indian pop; world; Sufi
- Occupations: Singer, songwriter
- Instrument: Vocals
- Years active: 1996–present
- Labels: Keda; Series 8; Imprint; SB

Shahin Badar (born 17 June 1974) is a British singer and songwriter who is best known in Europe and North America for her vocals on the Prodigy's single "Smack My Bitch Up" (1997), which went platinum.

== Early life ==
Badar was born on 17 June 1974, in Colchester, to a Bangladeshi father and Indian mother. She spent her formative years growing up in Kuwait and the UAE.

Inspired by her mother, Zohra Ahmed, who is a classical singer and encouraged by her teachers, Badar developed a blend of Arabic and Indian vocals. She also sings in English, Arabic, Bengali and Hindi.

Badar returned to England to continue her schooling at Gilbert Grammar School. Upon leaving she took up a position in Customs and Excise.

== Career ==
=== Recording ===
In 1996, Badar's first album Destiny was released, produced by British music producer Kuljit Bhamra. In 2010, her second album Laila was released.

Badar's vocal contributions feature in over 50 international film and TV soundtracks. Her vocals have also featured on shows such as the UK Music Hall of Fame, Bollywood films Yuva and Zubeidaa, the theatrical trailer for Lara Croft Tomb Raider: The Cradle of Life, Charlie's Angels, Scary Movie 2, Dhai Akshar Prem Ke, Closer, US sitcoms North Shore and Kevin Hill, and Sky News broadcasts.

She has worked with musicians and producers such as A. R. Rahman, Liam Howlett, Tim Deluxe, Fraser T Smith, Indian Ropeman, Jah Wobble, Twista, Juliette Lewis, Bobina. She supported 50 Cent and worked with director Ang Lee on the film The Hulk.

Several of Badar's collaborations have charted on the UK top ten singles, Independent, Dance, Radio and Bhangra charts with inclusions on three Prodigy UK No. 1 albums: The Fat of the Land, Always Outnumbered Never Outgunned, and Their Law: The Singles 1990-2005. Her most notable hit is "Smack My Bitch Up", released in 1997; in 2013, she received a quadruple platinum disc for her contributions.

Her vocal and written work has featured in adverts for Scottish Widows, Tongues on Fire and Zee Cine Awards.

She has also appeared as a judge for Brit Asia Talent show and one of the judges for Miss Universe Great Britain.

=== Performances ===
Badar has headlined various UK festivals, performed live with 50 Cent, and has performed in countries such as Switzerland, Singapore, Sweden, France, Belgium, Norway, Russia, Ireland, India, and at events such as Radio One Live, Creamfields, Oxegen, Glastonbury Festival, Ibiza Rocks, Global Gathering, World of Music, Arts and Dance (WOMAD), Respect Festival, Essentials Festival, and Mystery Land in the Netherlands.

She was the face of the Bradford International Festival in 2002 and headlined the Luton International Carnival in 2000.

== Awards and nominations ==
Year	Award	Category	Result
1997	Mercury Music Prize		Nominated
1998	Asian Pop and Media Awards	Best Female	Nominated
1999	Ethnic Multicultural Media Award	Best Newcomer	Nominated
1999	Asian Women of Achievement Awards		Nominated finalist
2000	Asian Pop Awards	Best Female vocalist	Won
2000	NetAsia		Shortlisted nomination
2002	Alhamra Muslim News	Award for Excellence	Shortlisted finalist
2002	Asian Women of Achievement Awards	Arts & Culture	Shortlisted finalist
2005	Desi Xpress	Artiste of the Week	Won
2005	Asian Achievers Award		Shortlisted
2006	Asian Achievers Award		Nominated
2006	Channel S Community Award	Music Category	Won
2007	India International Friendship Society	Glory of India award	Won
2010	UK Asian Music Awards	Best Female Alternative Act	Nominated

== Discography ==
=== Albums ===
Title	Album details	Peak chart position
Destiny	Released: 1996; Label: Keda Records; Formats: CD	
Laila	Released: 5 October 2008; Label: Series 8; Formats: CD, digital download	
Laila Remix's	Released: 2009; Label: Imprint Records; Formats: CD, digital download	

=== Singles ===
Year	Single	Chart position	Label
1996	"Jind Meriyeh"	UK Bhangra chart No. 4	
1999	"Jouleh Jouleh"		EMI
2010	"Andheri Raat"		Imprint Records
2011	"Leley Mera Dil"		Keda Records

=== Collaborations ===
Year	Title	Performed by	Written by	Label
1997	"Smack My Bitch Up"	The Prodigy and Shahin Badar	The Prodigy (Alaap chant vocalled by Shahin Badar	XL Recordings, Maverick Records
1999	"66 Meters"	Indian Ropeman featuring Shahin Badar	Indian Ropeman & Shahin Badar	Skint Records
2002	"Hayati"	Jah Wobble featuring Shahin Badar	Count Dubulah, Jah Wobble, Neil Sparkes & Shahin Badar	30 Hertz Records
2004	"Mundaya" (The Boy)	Tim Deluxe featuring Shahin Badar	Tim Deluxe & Shahin Badar	Underwater Records
2004	"Get Up Get Off"	The Prodigy	Liam Howlett, Shadin Badar, Twista and Juliette Lewis	XL Recordings, Maverick Records, Warner Bros. Records, Sony Music
2010	"Take It"	Noise Control featuring Shahin Badar		N.C. Recordings
2010	"Ummah Oum"	Kaya Project featuring Shahin Badar	Sebastian Taylor & Shahin Badar	Mariko Music Publishing Ltd
2012	"Happiness"	Supafly featuring Shahin Badar	Supafly	X-Energy Records
2020	"Sapphire"	Dee Montero featuring Shahin Badar	Dee Montero	Futurescope

== See also ==
- British Bangladeshi
- List of British Bangladeshis
