= North End, Essex =

Hamlet in Essex, England

Coordinates: 51.840°N 0.415°E

North End
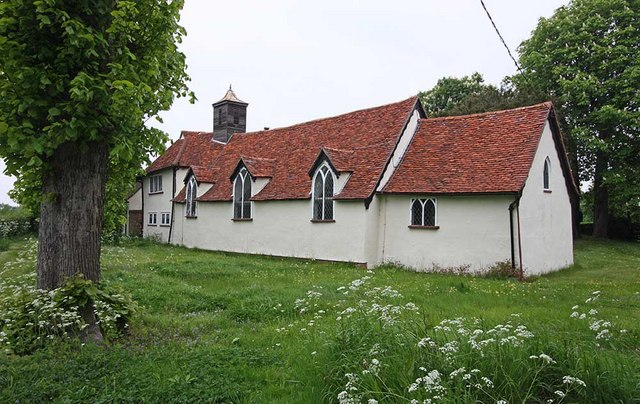
- Black Chapel Cottage

- Location within Essex
- OS grid reference: TL665185
- Civil parish: Great Waltham
- District: Chelmsford
- Shire county: Essex
- Region: East
- Country: England
- Sovereign state: United Kingdom
- Post town: CHELMSFORD
- Postcode district: CM3
- Dialling code: 01245
- Police: Essex
- Fire: Essex
- Ambulance: East of England
- UK Parliament: West Chelmsford

North End is a hamlet at the northern end of the parish of Great Waltham in the Chelmsford district of Essex, England.

Black Chapel Cottage, a former priest's house, is a Grade II–listed building. It was repaired in about 1950 after wartime bomb damage.

The Prodigy singer Keith Flint was a resident of North End from 1997 until his death in 2019.
