= Spitfire (song) =

Single by the Prodigy

from the album Always Outnumbered, Never Outgunned
- Released: 28 March 2005
- Recorded: Essex, England
- Length: 5:07 (album version); 3:26 (05 Version)
- Label: XL
- Songwriter: Liam Howlett
- Producer: Liam Howlett

The Prodigy singles chronology
"Hotride" (2004)	"Spitfire" (2005)	"Voodoo People/Out of Space" (2005)

"Spitfire" is a song by the English electronic dance music group The Prodigy. It was the third and last single from their 2004 album Always Outnumbered, Never Outgunned, of which it was as the opening track. It was initially released as a 12-inch vinyl record on 28 March 2005, as a digital download from iTunes the following day, and as a CD single on 11 April 2005.

It entered the UK Dance Chart at number one but did not chart on the all-genre UK Singles Chart. It has been included in The Sopranos, Gotham, House of Wax, and The Unborn soundtracks. It was used as the introduction song of the National Hockey League's Calgary Flames home games, and is also used as the ringwalk theme of the boxer George Groves.

Its opening vocals were performed by Liam Howlett's wife Natalie Appleton, formerly of the group All Saints, and its verse and other vocals were performed by Juliette Lewis.

== Music video ==
The accompanying music video is directed by Tim Qualtrough on 20 January 2005 and features digital effects blended with footage from live performances by the band. An alternate version of the music video uses clips from the film House of Wax.

== Track listing ==
CD and 12-inch vinyl

1. "Spitfire" (05 Version) – 3:27
2. "Spitfire" (Nightbreed Mix) – 6:10
3. "Spitfire" (Future Funk Squad's 'Dogfight' Remix) – 7:27

There exists also "Future Funk Squad's 2011 Remix" released as a free download.

== Charts ==
Chart (2005)	Peak position
UK Dance (Official Charts)	1
UK Indie (Official Charts)	38
