= Jaydee =

Dutch house music producer and DJ (born 1956)

JayDee
- Born: Robin Albers
- Origin: Netherlands
- Genres: House; techno
- Occupations: DJ, music producer
- Labels: Epic/SME; R&S

Robin Albers, who uses the stage name Jaydee, is a Dutch house music producer and DJ.

== Biography ==
After a degree in commercial studies, Albers played in the Dutch national baseball team and was triple Dutch arm-wrestling champion. Then, he started his career as DJ, and was a radio host on Dutch music and sport programs for eleven years.

His original stage name was Jei D. In 1992 (R&S Records), under the stage name JayDee, he released "Plastic Dreams", which reached number-one on the US Billboard Hot Dance Music/Club Play chart. The song, an instrumental, featured a prominent Hammond organ-style synthesizer melody, played in a jazzy, improvised manner. "Plastic Dreams" continues to be remixed and re-released today, mostly on unsolicited white labels. The track made the UK Singles Chart on two occasions; firstly in September 1997 when it reached number 18, and again in January 2004, when it reached number 35.

== Discography ==
=== Singles ===
Year	Single	Peak chart positions								Album
Year	Single	AUT	BEL	FRA	ITA	NLD	SWI	UK	US Dance	Album
1992/1993	"Plastic Dreams"	20	8	25	—	34	4	—	1	Singles only
1994	"Music Is So Special"	—	—	—	—	32	25	—	—	Singles only
1995	"I Want You"	—	—	—	—	—	—	—	—	House Nation
1996	"The Lounge"	—	—	—	—	—	—	—	—	House Nation
1997	"Plastic Dreams" (Revisited)	—	38	—	16	—	49	18	—	Singles only
1997	"U Got It"	—	—	—	—	—	—	—	—	Singles only
1998	"Reste Chez Moi"	—	—	—	—	—	—	—	—	Singles only
1998	"Spank! Spank!"	—	—	—	—	—	—	—	—	Singles only
2003	"Plastic Dreams 2003"	—	25	—	—	64	—	35	—	Singles only
2013	"Pulsate"	—	—	—	—	—	—	—	—	Singles only
"—" denotes releases that did not chart
