= Hotride =

2004 single by The Prodigy

Single by the Prodigy

from the album Always Outnumbered, Never Outgunned
- Released: 1 November 2004
- Recorded: Essex, England
- Length: 4:32
- Label: XL
- Songwriter(s): Liam Howlett; Jimmy Webb
- Producer(s): Liam Howlett

The Prodigy singles chronology
"Girls" (2004)	"Hotride" (2004)	"Spitfire" (2005)

"Hotride" (sometimes written as "Hot Ride") is the fifteenth single released by the British electronic music trio the Prodigy on 1 November 2004. It was the second single from the album Always Outnumbered, Never Outgunned and did not enter the UK Singles Chart as the CD was released in EP format with three additional B-sides and so did not conform to chart regulations. In Ireland, however, the song was eligible to chart, debuting and peaking at number 40 on the week dated 11 November.

The track featured vocals by Juliette Lewis and borrowed lyrics from Jimmy Webb's "Up, Up and Away (In My Beautiful Balloon)".

== Music video ==
The single's music video was directed by South African director Daniel Levi, but was rejected by Liam Howlett due to the amount of violence.

The video concentrates on a group of Japanese children going on a rampage. The kids first vandalize a nearby automobile, take pills of an unknown substance, beat up a policeman and put him in the trunk of a car, and subsequently kidnap a woman before heading to an office building, where they knock out the guards and destroy the offices. The kidnapped woman then escapes and calls the police. An anti-terrorist squad enters the building and catches the kids.

== Track listings ==
XL recordings CD single

1. "Hotride" (4:32)
2. "Who U Foolin" (3:40)
3. "Girls" (Rex the Dog Remix) (6:33)
4. "Hotride" (El Batori Mix) (4:44)

US promo

1. "Hotride" (Radio Edit) (3:38)
2. "Hotride" (El Batori Mix 3) (4:44)
3. "Hotride" (El Batori Mix 2) (5:23)
4. "Hotride" (El Batori Mix 1) (4:55)
5. "Hotride" (Album Version) (4:36)

== Charts ==
Chart (2004)	Peak position
Ireland (IRMA)	40
Ireland Dance (IRMA)	6
