= Plastic Dreams =

Single by Jaydee
- B-side: "Remix"
- Released: 1992 / 1993
- Recorded: 1992
- Genre: House; trance; techno
- Length: 3:05
- Label: R&S Records, SPV, Scorpio Music, Epic, Scorpio, Spinnin'
- Songwriters: Robin Albers & DJ Jaydee
- Producers: Robin Albers & DJ Jaydee

Jaydee singles chronology
"Plastic Dreams" (1992)	"Music Is So Special" (1994)

Music video
- "Plastic Dreams" on YouTube

"Plastic Dreams" is the debut single by Dutch producer Jaydee, initially released on R&S Records in 1992. It was successful in European countries and also achieved success in the US, where it topped the Billboard charts in two different categories. American music critic Robert Christgau named it the best single of 1993 in his year-end list for the Pazz & Jop critics poll.

== Composition and release ==
The song, an instrumental, features a prominent Hammond organ style synthesizer melody played in a jazzy, improvised manner. With some versions around ten minutes long, the song is known for giving dancers a good aerobic exercise workout.

In 1993, "Plastic Dreams" hit number-one on the US Hot Dance Music/Club Play chart. The song continues to be remixed and re-released today by many artists, such as David Morales, mostly on unsolicited white labels. The track has made the British charts on more than one occasion, first in September 1997 when it reached number 18 and again in January 2004 when it reached number 35. In 1993, Epic Records (owned by Sony Music Entertainment) featured the song on the first edition of the compilation Welcome to the Future. Shortly after, Epic Records negotiated the acquisition of most rights associated with the song.

== Critical reception ==
Ian Dinsmor from AllMusic said, "Considered an undying anthem within club culture, "Plastic Dreams" never fails to bring smiles and yells from dancefloor revelers. Recognizable immediately by its droning synth and rolling organ riffs, this track has become a classic late night staple at inner city clubs." Larry Flick from Billboard magazine commented, "Robin Albers, the act's mastermind, cooks an appetizing stew of chunky tribal beats and free-form trance keyboard noodling. The track gets its edge from an aftertaste of subtle techno spice." British magazine Mixmag ranked it number 15 in its "100 Greatest Dance Singles Of All Time" list in 1996. Charlie Hall from Music Week's RM Dance Update commented, "More than 10 minutes of pure trancey groove. This is the first classic of '93, the most sexy bass and organ riffs strolling along — totally funky and chilled without losing any momentum or getting ambient. It builds and teases but never loses the groove." A reviewer from The Network Forty deemed it "a fierce trance track with very sparse vocals..."

Sherman at the Controls from NME noted, "A cavernous, hollow sound reverberates as a piping Doors-style organ skips in an out for over ten minutes journeying ever deeper, ever darker. Quite an incredible fusion and Vibes SOTW. Number Two." James Hunter from Vibe wrote that the track "is a rave instrumental to compete with Herbie Hancock's "Rockit". The Jaydee touch—earthy in the keyboard melody, unstoppable and space-bound in the wave after wave of rhythm tracks—is warm, brave. Both "Trance" and "Tribal" mixes excel." American music critic Robert Christgau for The Village Voice named it the best single of 1993 in his year-end list for the Pazz & Jop critics poll.

== Impact and legacy ==
American DJ, DJ Camacho, named "Plastic Dreams" one of his favourites in 1995, saying, "This has been out four or five years and it's still being played. It's guaranteed to get everyone on the floor, no matter what crowd you are playing to. It's another one of my favourite mixing records. I always carry this with me. I play soulful so I balance out the music with something else. This is a great techno record than can be played pitched down to minus 2 and then it just takes you on a trip. It's the only techno track that made it back here and it got picked up by Epic."

In 1996, English musician, DJ, and record producer Norman Cook also named it one of his favourites, adding, "The ultimate E-head record. Three records turned me on to house: this one, 'I'll Be Your Friend' by Robert Owens and 'A Deeper Love' by Clivilles & Cole." In 1997, American songwriter, record producer, DJ and singer Robert Owens picked the song as one of his all-time top-10 tracks. He explained, "This is hypnotic and sure to get the floor going every time. It came out around 1993. It's one of those slow, building kind of records that will always be around. A classic ahead of its time. It's something l've never taken out of my box."

== Versions ==
=== 1992 versions ===
- "Plastic Dreams" (Long Version) — 10:15
- "Plastic Dreams" (Radio Edit) — 3:05
- "Plastic Dreams" (Remix Radio Edit) — 4:40
- "Plastic Dreams" (Trance Mix) — 6:55
- "Plastic Dreams" (Tribal Mix) — 7:20
- "Plastic Dreams" (Groove Mix) — 8:36

=== 1995 versions ===
- "Plastic Dreams" (Rhythm Masters Remix) — 7:41
- "Plastic Dreams" (Pascal F.E.O.S. Remix Part I) — 7:16
- "Plastic Dreams" (Pascal F.E.O.S. Remix Part II) — 6:50
- "Plastic Dreams" (The 2000 Remake) — 8:00

=== 1997 versions ===
- "Plastic Dreams" (S & S radio mix) — 3:44
- "Plastic Dreams" (Shahin & Simon Re-construction) — 6:30
- "Plastic Dreams" (Funky Green Dub) (Murk) — 8:01
- "Plastic Dreams" (Miami Heat Beats) (Murk)
- "Plastic Dreams" (Frank De Wulf Remix) — 6:55
- "Plastic Dreams" (David Morales Remix) — 8:20
- "Plastic Dreams" (David Morales Club Mix) — 11:02
- "Plastic Dreams" (Bass & Drum Remix) (Morales) — 8:03
- "Plastic Dreams" (Def Mix) (Morales)
- "Plastic Dreams" (David's Dream) (Morales) — 15:03
- "Plastic Dreams" (Angel Moraes's Dream Mix) — 5:11
- "Plastic Dreams" (Peshay Remix) — 8:24
- "Plastic Dreams" (Hohner Retro Mix) — 6:09
- "Plastic Dreams" (Mr YT Remix) — 6:53
- "Plastic Dreams" (Boom Boom Satellites Remix) — 7:55
- "Plastic Dreams" (T.C.'s Remix) (Tony Crooks) — 6:40
- "Plastic Dreams" (Rainforest Mix) (Tony Crooks) — 6:44

=== 2003 versions ===
- "Plastic Dreams" (Radio Edit) — 3:29
- "Plastic Dreams" (MC Version) — 3:54
- "Plastic Dreams" (Radio Edit) — 3:23
- "Plastic Dreams" (2003 Remix) — 7:14
- "Plastic Dreams" (ATFC 'Plastic Surgery' Remix) — 9:10
- "Plastic Dreams" (Lee-Cabrera Remix) — 6:34
- "Plastic Dreams" (Tayo & Acid Rockers Remix) — 7:20
- "Plastic Dreams" (Twisted Individual Remix) — 5:53
- "Plastic Dreams" (LSD Remix) — 12:03

=== 2006 version ===
- "Plastic Dreams" (Switch Remix) — 7:09

=== 2008 version ===
- "Plastic Dreams" (Wideboys Bassline Remix) — 5:00

=== 2011 versions ===
- "Plastic Dreams" (Sergio Fernandez & JP Candela Remix) — 7:46
- "Plastic Dreams" (Koen Groeneveld Remix) - 7:25
- "Plastic Dreams" (Dino Lenny & Amnesia Remix) - 8:11
- "Plastic Dreams" (Reborn Mix) - 8:21
- "Plastic Dreams" (Sergio Fernandez & JP Candela Remix) - 7:44
- "Plastic Dreams" (Folsch & Lanza Remix) - 6:36
- "Plastic Dreams" (Housebangerz feat. MC Joe Remix) - 6:29
- "Plastic Dreams" (Valley Mix) - 9:49

=== 2012 version ===
- Audiojack - "Plastic Dreams" (20 Year Tribute) — 8:20

=== 2016 version ===
- "Plastic Dreams" (Shadow Child Remix) — 6:03

=== 2019 versions ===
- "Plastic Dreams" (Nicole Moudaber Renaissance Remix) — 9:08
- The Cube Guys - "Plastic Dreams" (Cubed Remix 2020) — 6:01

== Popular culture ==
- The song is featured in the 2005 video game Grand Theft Auto: Liberty City Stories on the radio station Rise FM.
- The song is featured in the 2016 movie "Belgica" by director Felix van Groeningen.

== Charts ==
=== Weekly charts ===
Chart (1992–1993)	Peak position
Austria (Ö3 Austria Top 40)	20
Belgium (Ultratop 50 Flanders)	8
Canada Dance/Urban (RPM)	3
Europe (European Dance Radio)	14
France (SNEP)	25
Greece (Pop + Rock)	2
Netherlands (Dutch Top 40 Tipparade)	2
Netherlands (Single Top 100)	34
Switzerland (Schweizer Hitparade)	4
UK Dance (Music Week)	11
US Hot Dance Club Play (Billboard)	1
US Hot Dance Music/Maxi-Singles Sales (Billboard)	1

Chart (1997)	Peak position
Belgium (Ultratop 50 Flanders)	38
Italy (Musica e dischi)	16
Switzerland (Schweizer Hitparade)	49
UK Singles (OCC)	18
UK Indie (Music Week)	1

Chart (2003–2004)	Peak position
Belgium (Ultratop 50 Flanders)	25
Belgium (Ultratip Bubbling Under Wallonia)	17
Hungary (Dance Top 40)	3
Netherlands (Single Top 100)	64
UK Singles (OCC)	35
US Singles Sales (Billboard)	19

Chart (2020)	Peak position
Hungary (Single Top 40)	33

=== Year-end charts ===
Chart (1993)	Position
Belgium (Ultratop Flanders)	65
Canada Dance/Urban (RPM)	23
Switzerland (Schweizer Hitparade)	28
