= Bílovice-Lutotín =

- Municipality
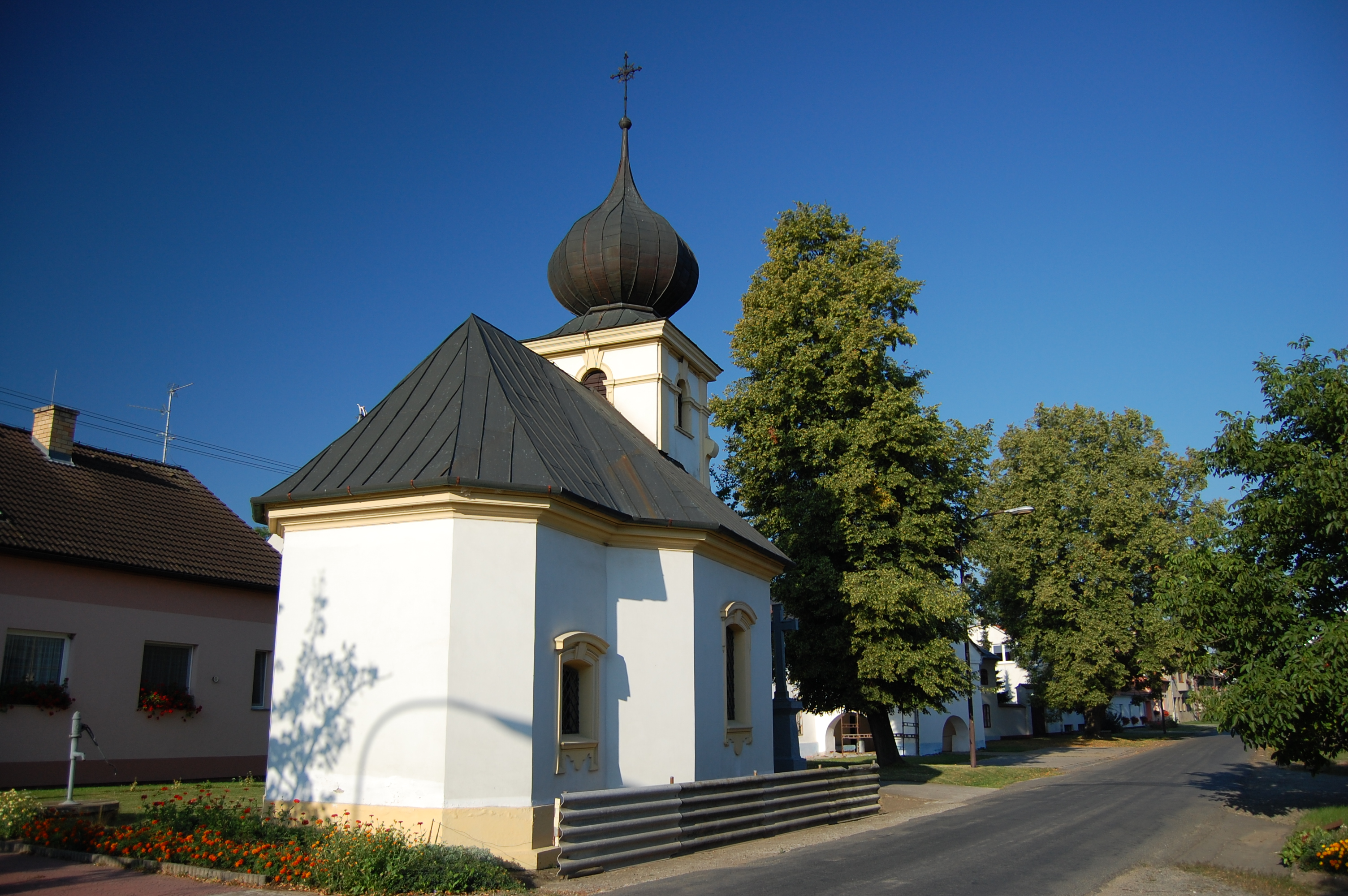
- Chapel of Saint Florian in Bílovice

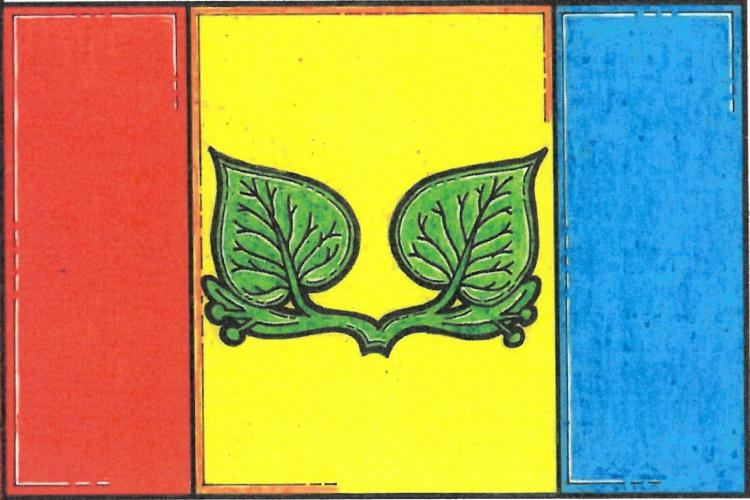
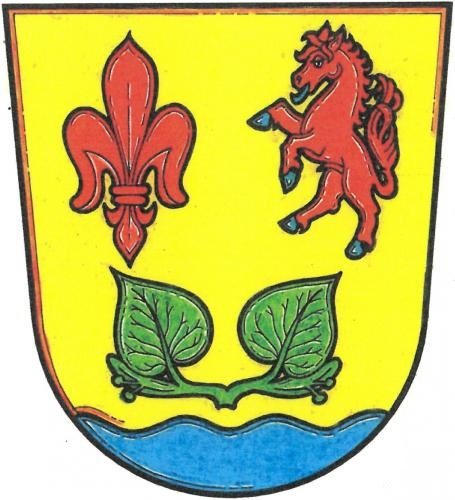
- Flag Coat of arms

- Location in the Czech Republic
- Coordinates: 49°30′40″N 17°2′24″E
- Country: Czech Republic
- Region: Olomouc
- District: Prostějov
- First mentioned: 1141

Area
  - Total: 6.87 km^{2} (2.65 sq mi)
- Elevation: 249 m (817 ft)

Population (2026-01-01)
  - Total: 518
  - Density: 75.4/km^{2} (195/sq mi)
- Time zone: UTC+1 (CET)
  - Summer (DST): UTC+2 (CEST)
- Postal code: 798 41
- Website: www.bilovice-lutotin.cz

Bílovice-Lutotín is a municipality in Prostějov District in the Olomouc Region of the Czech Republic. It has about 500 inhabitants.

Bílovice-Lutotín lies approximately 9 kilometres (6 mi) north-west of Prostějov, 19 km (12 mi) south-west of Olomouc, and 198 km (123 mi) east of Prague.

== Administrative division ==
Bílovice-Lutotín consists of two municipal parts (in brackets population according to the 2021 census):

- Bílovice (331)
- Lutotín (171)

== History ==
The first written mention of Lutotín is in a deed of bishop Jindřich Zdík from 1141. The first written mention of Bílovice is from 1305.

== Demographics ==
Historical population
Year	Pop.	±%
1869	709	—
1880	750	+5.8%
1890	807	+7.6%
1900	806	−0.1%
1910	801	−0.6%
1921	809	+1.0%
1930	820	+1.4%
1950	669	−18.4%
1961	632	−5.5%
1970	583	−7.8%
1980	506	−13.2%
1991	446	−11.9%
2001	485	+8.7%
2011	493	+1.6%
2021	502	+1.8%
Source: Censuses
