= Smack My Bitch Up =

1997 single by the Prodigy

Single by the Prodigy

from the album The Fat of the Land
- Released: 17 November 1997
- Genre: Big beat; techno
- Length: 5:43 (album version); 4:45 (edit)
- Label: XL
- Songwriters: Liam Howlett; Cedric Miller; Trevor Randolph; Maurice Smith; Keith Thornton
- Producer: Liam Howlett

The Prodigy singles chronology
"Breathe" (1996)	"Smack My Bitch Up" (1997)	"Baby's Got a Temper" (2002)

Music video
- Smack My Bitch Up (DVD edit) on Vimeo

"Smack My Bitch Up" is a song by English electronic dance music band the Prodigy. It was released in November 1997 as the third and final single from their third album, The Fat of the Land (1997). In 2013, Mixmag readers voted it the third greatest dance track of all time.

The song caused considerable controversy because of its suggestive title and explicit music video, which depicted scenes of drunken and drug-fuelled sexual assault and violence. The refrain, which consists only of the line "Change my pitch up/Smack my bitch up", was sampled from the song "Give the Drummer Some" by the Ultramagnetic MCs. The song also contains a brief medley of Shahin Badar vocalising alap. In 2010, it was voted as the most controversial song of all time in a survey conducted by PRS for Music.

Prior to the release of the single, Liam Howlett was presented with three remixes of the title song, one by Jonny L, one by DJ Hype and one by Slacker. Howlett chose the DJ Hype remix to be released on the single. The Jonny L remix was released through a free CD that came along with an issue of Muzik magazine, while the Slacker remix was never officially released, although it surfaced on a rare and limited set of white label records.

== Composition ==
The lyrics "Change my pitch up / Smack my bitch up" are repeated through the whole song. The vocals are sampled and altered from the Ultramagnetic MCs song "Give the Drummer Some"; the original lyrics, performed by rapper Kool Keith, are: "Switch up change my pitch up" / "Smack my bitch up, like a pimp". Kool Keith had previously been sampled by the Prodigy in the track "Out of Space". The female vocals in "Smack My Bitch Up" were performed by Shahin Badar. Badar's vocals and harmonies are based on "Nana (The Dreaming)" performed by Sheila Chandra. Initially Liam Howlett used a direct sample of Chandra's song, but later had the vocal resung after sample clearance issues. The track also contains samples from "Funky Man" by Kool & the Gang, "In Memory Of" by Randy Weston, "House of Rising Funk" by Afrique, "Like This" by Mixmaster Gee and the Turntable Orchestra and "Bulls on Parade" by Rage Against the Machine.

== Critical reception ==
British magazine Music Week gave "Smack My Bitch Up" five out of five, picking it as Single of the Week. NME wrote that apart from the "offending line", it was an "otherwise superb rush of grinding rawk-funk".

== Chart performance ==
In the UK the song peaked at No. 8, ultimately spending 16 weeks in the top 100, despite limited air time. The song reached the top 15 in several countries, such as Canada, New Zealand, Norway and Sweden. The song performed best in Finland, securing the band their third Finnish No. 1 hit alongside "Firestarter" and "Breathe", while also topping the maxi-singles chart in Spain. Although not reaching the top 20 in those countries, "Smack My Bitch Up" was a hit in the Netherlands peaking at No. 22, in Australia reaching No. 41, and in the United States reaching No. 89. The single also returned to the Billboard charts after Flint's death, entering number 23 on its Dance/Electronic Digital Songs Sales chart in its 16 March 2019 issue.

== Music video ==
Director Jonas Åkerlund's music video for "Smack My Bitch Up" was rarely seen on television due to its controversial subject matter. The video, filmed entirely in first-person perspective, depicts a drug-and-alcohol-fueled night out through the eyes of a mostly unseen character, and utilises different camera movements, through a 35 mm film camera attached to director of photography Henrik Halvarson's head, corresponding with the protagonist's altered state of mind. This character first showers and dresses, then drinks vodka and sniffs cocaine before going out. At a bar, the protagonist has several more drinks, sexually assaults multiple women, violently attacks several men, and destroys the DJ's equipment before running to the toilets to vomit and inject intravenous drugs, resulting in a shaky and disorientated vision. Later, at a strip club, the protagonist drinks more alcohol while watching nude dancers, and eventually breaks into and steals a car to bring one stripper home to have sex. Finally, after they have sex, a look in the mirror reveals the protagonist to have been a young blonde woman; as the song ends, she passes out on her bed.

It was Åkerlund's first video outside his native Sweden, and he noted that his video for the Per Gessle song "Kix" was what Howlett showed to the band upon his invitation. While he first cancelled the commitment due to a lack of ideas, Åkerlund went out with a friend to party in Copenhagen, and one of the few things he remembered from the experience, kicking down a bathroom stall door to find someone already there, brought the inspiration to ask for the job back. The ending came simply because "it would be an unexpected twist if this crazy party person was a woman and not a man". The band and the label hated a rough cut and said Åkerlund was fired and did not have to keep working, but this actually motivated him to finish the video and send it to Keith Flint, which wound up getting the band's approval. Åkerlund summed up the video in that "It was supposed to be outrageous and over the top, and we considered it comedy when we watched it later."

Liam Howlett noted:

There's a realness to that video. Most people have had nights out like that, off their head on coke and drink … It's not to everyone's taste, but not everything we do is. No radio station was gonna play the song, so we thought we'd make a video that no one would play either.

== Controversy ==
=== Lyrical controversy ===
The song's lyrics, often held as misogynistic, were defended by the band, who said that the lyrics were being misinterpreted and the song actually meant "doing anything intensely".

"Smack My Bitch Up" was wiped out by the BBC and only an instrumental version was played on BBC Radio 1. On the chart rundown, other tracks from the single release were played, and the title "Smack My Bitch Up" was not mentioned. On the BBC World Service radio chart run down it was mentioned as "Smack" and was not played. Yet on the first episode of Top of the Pops in which it charted, the DJ Hype remix was played over the top 20 countdown, including the offending lyric of "Change my pitch up, smack my bitch up." On his 25 April 2009 Radio 1 Essential Mix, producer Sub Focus included his own drum and bass remix of "Smack My Bitch Up" which also included this lyric, though a warning preceded the track.

ITV Chart Show refused to display the name of the song when the video was played during one of their episodes. Usually aired at 11.30 a.m., the show displayed the on-screen graphic as simply "The Prodigy"; the title of the song would usually appear underneath. This also meant they avoided playing a part of the song that used the offending lyric when playing the customary music video clip.

"Smack My Bitch Up" received daytime airplay on London indie station XFM and reached No. 1 in their Top 30 chart.

In 2016, a DJ for the Chicago Cubs played "Smack My Bitch Up" as pitcher Aroldis Chapman left the mound. Chapman had served a 29-game suspension under Major League Baseball's domestic violence policy. The Cubs apologised for the music choice and announced that they had fired the DJ.

=== Video ===
Extract from the video showing first-person intravenous drug use by the protagonist

MTV initially restricted the video to late-night rotation, starting with a midnight debut on 120 Minutes on 7 December 1997. The video garnered controversy for depiction of driving under the influence, drug use, violence (including street fighting and a hit-and-run incident), vandalism, nudity and sex, and also drew criticism for misogyny, particularly from feminist groups such as the US National Organization for Women (NOW), accusing it of encouraging violence against women. On 22 December, MTV removed the video from rotation; a statement was posted on the network's official website the same day, which stated that protests from feminist organisations had nothing to do with the decision. Despite the controversy, the video was nominated for four awards in the 1998 MTV Video Music Awards, and eventually won Best Dance Video and Breakthrough Video. In 2002, MTV2 played the full unedited version as part of its special Most Controversial Videos. In December 2007, Chart Show TV mistakenly played the video at 1:45pm, breaching three of Ofcom's rules.

== Track listing ==
=== XL Recordings ===
- 12-inch vinyl record
1. "Smack My Bitch Up" (LP version) – 5:42
2. "No Man Army" (featuring Tom Morello) – 4:44
3. "Smack My Bitch Up" (DJ Hype remix) – 7:17
4. "Mindfields" (Headrock dub) – 4:34
- CD single
1. "Smack My Bitch Up" (edit) – 4:45
2. "No Man Army" – 4:44
3. "Mindfields" (Headrock dub) – 4:34
4. "Smack My Bitch Up" (DJ Hype remix) – 7:17

=== Maverick Records ===
- 12-inch vinyl record "Black sleeve"

A1. "Smack My Bitch Up" (album version) – 5:43
A2. "Mindfields" (Headrock dub) – 4:35
B1. "Smack My Bitch Up" (DJ Hype remix) – 7:17

- 12-inch vinyl record

A1. "Smack My Bitch Up" (LP version) – 5:42
A2. "No Man Army" (featuring Tom Morello) – 4:44
B1. "Mindfields" (Headrock dub) – 4:34
B2. "Smack My Bitch Up" (DJ Hype remix) – 7:17

- Digipak
1. "Smack My Bitch Up" (edit) – 4:45
2. "No Man Army" (featuring Tom Morello) – 4:44
3. "Mindfields" (Headrock dub) – 4:34
4. "Smack My Bitch Up" (DJ Hype remix) – 7:17

* The digipak was released in cooperation with Sire.

== Charts ==
Chart (1997–2019)	Peak position
Australia (ARIA)	41
Belgium (Ultratip Bubbling Under Flanders)	7
Canada (Digital Song Sales)	12
Europe (Eurochart Hot 100)	20
Finland (Suomen virallinen lista)	1
Germany (GfK)	51
Hungary (Mahasz)	5
Ireland (IRMA)	6
Italy (Musica e dischi)	15
Netherlands (Dutch Top 40)	19
Netherlands (Single Top 100)	22
New Zealand (Recorded Music NZ)	8
Norway (VG-lista)	8
Scottish Singles Sales (Official Charts)	9
Spain Maxi-Singles (AFYVE)	1
Sweden (Sverigetopplistan)	13
UK Singles (Official Charts)	8
UK Dance (Official Charts)	1
US Billboard Hot 100	89
US Dance/Electronic Digital Song Sales (Billboard)	23

== Certifications ==
Region	Certification	Certified units/sales
Canada (Music Canada)	Gold	40,000^{‡}
New Zealand (RMNZ)	Gold	5,000^{*}
United Kingdom (BPI)	Platinum	600,000^{‡}
^{*} Sales figures based on certification alone.^{‡} Sales+streaming figures based on certification alone.

== Release history ==
Region	Date	Format(s)	Label(s)	Ref(s).
United States	3 November 1997	Modern rock radio	Maverick; Mute; XL; Warner Bros.	
United Kingdom	17 November 1997	12-inch vinyl; CD; cassette	XL	
Japan	27 November 1997	CD	XL; Maximum X; Avex Trax	

== In other media ==
In 2000, it was featured in the movie Charlie's Angels, which was later spoofed in the 2001 movie Scary Movie 2.

Lil Jon & the East Side Boyz: The music video for their 2002 single "I Don't Give a Fuck" heavily references and adapts the concept of the "Smack My Bitch Up" video. It utilizes the same first-person POV filming style, translating the setting to Atlanta's nightlife, and concludes with a similar twist revealing the protagonist is a woman. Due to its explicit content, the video was also restricted to late-night television broadcasts.

In 2011, the music video is homaged in Season 1 Episode 13 of The Amazing World of Gumball, "The Ghost", when Carrie possess Gumball's body in order for her to experience eating again, she sends him in a voracious junk-food spree, with every eating rampage being shot in first-person perspective.

In 2012, a parody video, by the now defunct YouTube channel TheCube95, went viral. The video featured a cat exhibiting similar reckless behavior to that of the woman in the original music video.

In 2013, the song appeared in Season 9 Episode 6 of It's Always Sunny in Philadelphia when Mac is fighting off yakuza robbers in a convenience store.

In 2020, the game Cyberpunk 2077 featured a scene where the main character, V, in the "Chipin' In" main quest, goes to clubs, gets tattoos, does drugs and drinks alcohol while being controlled by the character of Johnny Silverhand. The cutscene is in first-person perspective (just like most of the game) and has a corresponding song on the soundtrack titled "Smack My Chip Up", a clear reference to "Smack My Bitch Up". Released the same year, Assassin's Creed Valhalla includes a sidequest called "The Prodigy", where the player character boxes a clergyman, prompting a character named Keith to sing, "Smack my bishop!"

The song appeared in an episode of the 5th season of the crime drama series Fargo. The song appeared in Top Gear as background music in Season Four fourth episode, during the Porsche Carrera GT's test.

In 2026, the song appeared in the closing scene of Season 2, Episode 2 of the British crime drama TV series MobLand, in which a group of masked hitmen violently ambush the Harrigan family and its associates.
