= Girls (The Prodigy song) =

2004 song by The Prodigy

Single by the Prodigy

from the album Always Outnumbered, Never Outgunned
- Released: 30 August 2004
- Recorded: 2003 (Essex, England)
- Length: 4:05
- Label: XL
- Songwriters: Hubert Eaves III, Liam Howlett, Paul Leveridge, James D-Train Williams, Greg Wilson (DJ)
- Producer: Liam Howlett

The Prodigy singles chronology
"Baby's Got a Temper" (2002)	"Girls" (2004)	"Hotride" (2004)

"Girls" is the fourteenth single released by British electronic music group the Prodigy on 30 August 2004. It was the first single from the album Always Outnumbered, Never Outgunned. "Girls" peaked at number 19 on the UK Singles Chart, number 18 in Finland and number 12 in Greece.

The single's music video was directed by Mat Cook and Julian House, who also designed the artwork for the album and single. It featured experimental computer graphics with various psychedelic themes. The music video was introduced with animation, in high-definition format made in late-2003 and early 2004.

The sample used in the hook is re-made but taken from the Broken Glass single "Style of the Street" and also the song samples D. Train "You're the One for Me".

== Track listings ==
12-inch vinyl record

1. A1. "Girls" (4:06)
2. B1. "More Girls"
3. B2. "Under My Wheels" (Original Mix)

CD single

1. "Girls" (4:14)
2. "More Girls" (4:27)
3. "Under My Wheels" (Original Mix) (3:41)

== Charts ==
Chart (2004)	Peak position
Belgium (Ultratip Bubbling Under Flanders)	18
Belgium (Ultratip Bubbling Under Wallonia)	13
Finland (Suomen virallinen lista)	18
Greece (IFPI)	12
Ireland (IRMA)	27
Ireland Dance (IRMA)	2
Netherlands (Single Top 100)	28
Scottish Singles Sales (Official Charts)	26
UK Singles (Official Charts)	19
UK Dance (Official Charts)	2
UK Indie (Official Charts)	4

== Promotional single release ==
"Girls/Memphis Bells"

Promotional single by the Prodigy

from the album Always Outnumbered, Never Outgunned
- Released: 21 June 2004
- Recorded: 2003
- Length: 4:06 ("Girls"); 4:28 ("Memphis Bells")
- Songwriters: Hubert Eaves III, Liam Howlett, Paul Leveridge, James D-Train Williams, Greg Wilson (DJ)

On 21 June 2004, "Girls/Memphis Bells" was released as a promotional single by the band as a very limited 12-inch vinyl record. Beyond this, "Memphis Bells" was made exclusively available online as a digital download on 28 June 2004 via a now defunct website. Available in a limited edition of 5,000, each of the downloads had a unique variation of both the track and the artwork.

=== 12-inch vinyl record sides ===
A. "Girls" (4:06)
B. "Memphis Bells" (4:28)
