= List of DJ Awards winners and nominees =

This is a list of DJ Awards winners and nominees. The first DJ Awards ceremony was in 1998 and has run for 22 consecutive editions until 2019. There was a 4-year hiatus until the ceremony returned in 2024. The awards are known internationally as the Oscars of the electronic music and DJ community.

== Winners and nominees ==
=== 1998 ===
The 1st edition winners nominees and recipients were chosen from 8 categories.

| Best House Garage DJ | Best Techno Trance DJ |
|---|---|
| (United States) Erick Morillo Winner; Pippi; Claudio Coccoluto; Roger Sanchez; Frankie Knuckles; Satoshi Tomiie | (United States) Supa DJ Dimitri Winner; John Digweed; Darren Emerson; Carl Cox; Laurent Garnier; Sven Väth |
| Best Drum 'N' Bass Trip Hop DJ | DJ Innovator |
| (United Kingdom) Fabio Winner; Grooverider; LTJ Bukem; Kemistry and Storm; DJ 809 | (United Kingdom) DJ Pathaan Winner; Sonique; Richie Hawtin |
| Best Ambient Experimental DJ | DJ's Band of the Year |
| (Spain) José Padilla Winner; Dr Alex Paterson; Jonathan Grey; DJ Bruno | (France) Daft Punk Winner; Chemical Brothers; Propeller heads; Underworld; 4 Hero |
| Best Radio DJ | Special Awards |
| (Spain) Fernandisco Winner; Pete Tong; Danny Rampling; Judge Jules; Albertino | Best Track of the Season: (France) Music Sounds Better with You for 'Stardust', Winner; Honorific: (United Kingdom) Tony De Vit, Winner; Life Time Achievement: (Spain) Cesar de Melero, Winner |

=== 1999 ===
The 2nd edition winners nominees and recipients were chosen from 9 categories.

| Best House Garage DJ | Best Techno DJ |
|---|---|
| (United States) Roger Sanchez Winner; Frankie Knuckles; Claudio Coccoluto; Tony Humphries; Pippi | (United Kingdom) Paul Oakenfold Winner; Carl Cox; Paul van Dyk; Sven Väth; Jeff Mills |
| Best Drum 'N' Bass & Beats DJ | DJ Innovator |
| (United Kingdom) LTJ Bukem Winner; Grooverider; DJ Krush; DJ Rap; Tsuyoshi Suzuki | (United Kingdom) Juno Reactor Winner; Fatboy Slim; Richie Hawtin; Basement Jaxx; DJ Shadow |
| Best Ambient Experimental DJ | DJ's Band of the Year |
| (United Kingdom) Mixmaster Morris Winner; Dr Alex Paterson; DJ Morpheus; DJ Pathaan; DJ Bruno | (United Kingdom) Basement Jaxx Winner; Faithless; Orbital; Underworld; Leftfield |
| Best Radio DJ | Re-Mix of the Year |
| (United Kingdom) Pete Tong Winner; Danny Rampling; David Moreno; Judge Jules; Tony Humphries | (United States) David Morales Winner; Fat Boy Slim; Armand Van Helden; Club 69; Masters at Work |
| Special Awards | Special Awards |
| Most Kickin: (Germany) Marc Spoon Winner; Best Track of the Season: (Denmark) Funkstar De Luxe for 'Sun is Shining', Winner | Special Achievement: (United States) Paul Johnson, Winner; Honorific: (Italy) Joe T Vannelli, Winner; Life Time Achievement: (United States) Frankie Knuckles, Winner |

=== 2000 ===
The 3rd edition winners nominees and recipients were chosen from 11 categories.

| Best House DJ | Best Techno DJ |
|---|---|
| (United States) David Morales Winner; Frankie Knuckles; Roger Sanchez; Erick Morillo; Danny Tenaglia | (Germany) Sven Väth Winner; Carl Cox; Darren Emerson; Billy Nasty; Jeff Mills |
| Best Drum 'N' Bass & Beats DJ | Innovator Experimental |
| (United Kingdom) LTJ Bukem Winner; Grooverider; Fatboy Slim; DJ Rap; Fabio; Grooverider | (Germany) Jazzanova Winner; Richie Hawtin; DJ Vadim; Scratch Perverts; Mr Scruff |
| Best Chillout DJ | Best Trance DJ |
| (United Kingdom) DJ Morpheus Winner; Dr Alex Paterson; Mixmaster Morris; Ibizarre; Chris Coco | (United Kingdom) Paul Oakenfold Winner; Sasha; Paul van Dyk; Timo Maas; Ferry Corsten |
| Best Radio DJ | DJ's DJ |
| (United Kingdom) Danny Rampling Winner; Pete Tong; Coldcut; Judge Jules; The Dream Teem | (United States) Danny Tenaglia Winner; Basement Jaxx; Francois K; Carl Cox |
| Outstanding Achievement | Leader of the New Breed |
| (United Kingdom) Danny Rampling Winner; Tony Humphries; Frankie Knuckles; Laurent Garnier; David Morales | (United Kingdom) Steve Lawler Winner; Yousef; Jon Carter; Anthony Pappa; Java |
| Special Awards | Special Awards |
| Track of the Season: (France) Modjo for 'Lady', Winner; Set of the Season: (United Kingdom) Carl Cox Winner | Special: (United States) Paul Johnson, Winner; Special: (Spain) David Gausa & Xavi Laso for "Swing Flaix", Winner's; Honorific: (Spain) Dan Moreno, Winner |

=== 2001 ===
The 4th edition winners nominees and recipients were chosen from 9 categories.

| Best House DJ | Best Techno DJ |
|---|---|
| (United States) Erick Morillo - Winner; Roger Sanchez; Deep Dish; David Morales | (United Kingdom) Carl Cox - Winner; Sven Väth; Darren Emerson; Richie Hawtin; Jeff Mills |
| Best Drum 'N' Bass & Beats DJ | Best Tech House DJ |
| (United Kingdom) Peshay - Winner; Roni Size/Reprazent; DJ Rap; 4 Hero; DJ Krust | (Japan) Satoshi Tomiie - Winner; Danny Tenaglia; John Digweed; Laurent Garnier; Timo Maas |
| Best Psychedelic Trance DJ | Best Trance DJ |
| (Spain) Riktam & Bansi - Winner; Max Lanfranconi; Frank "e"; Serge Souque; Raja Ram | (United Kingdom) Judge Jules - Winner; Sasha; Paul van Dyk; Paul Oakenfold; Ferry Corsten |
| Best Underground DJ | Best Eclectic/Experimental DJ |
| (United Kingdom) DJ EZ - Winner; 2-step; Coldcut; Matt jam Lamont; DJ Spoony; Karl tuff enuff Brown; Steve Sutherland | (United Kingdom) Mixmaster Morris - Winner; DJ Morpheus; Mr Scruff; DR Alex Paterson |
| Special Awards | Special Awards |
| Best Newcomer: (Argentina) Hernan Cattaneo - Winner; Best Track of the Season: (United States) Kings of Tomorrow for 'Finally' - Winner; Best Set of the Season: (United Kingdom) Darren Emerson, (United States) Erick Morillo (Back to Back) at Subliminal Sessions - Winners; Best Re-Mix of the Year (United Kingdom) Superchumbo for 'Revolution - Winner | Best Ibiza DJ: (Spain) Java - Winner; Lucki Strike DJ Expression: Sebastian Gamboa, DJ Smoka, Señor Lobo, Paco Buggin, Silvia Sanchez, Carlos Jurado, Fernando Guillon, Sandro Bianchi - Winners; God Father: (United States) Frankie Knuckles - Winner; Outstanding Contribution: (United Kingdom) Ministry of Sound - Winner |

=== 2002 ===
The 5th Edition edition winners nominees and recipients were chosen from 8 categories.

| Best House DJ | Best Techno DJ |
|---|---|
| (United States) Roger Sanchez - Winner; Felix Da Housecat; Erick Morillo; Louie Vega; Frankie Knuckles | (United Kingdom) Carl Cox & (United Kingdom) Richie Hawtin (tied) - Winners; Sven Väth; John Acquaviva; Jeff Mills |
| Best Progressive DJ | Best Tech House DJ |
| (Netherlands) Tiësto - Winner; Paul Oakenfold; Paul van Dyk; Sasha; John Digweed | (United Kingdom) X Press 2 - Winner; Danny Tenaglia; Steve Lawler; Darren Emerson; Timo Maas |
| Best Psychedelic Trance DJ | Underground/Garage DJ |
| (Italy) Max Lanfranconi - Winner; Riktam & Bansi; Dimitri Nakov; Tristan; Serge Souque | (United Kingdom) 2-step - Winner; Matt jam Lamont; DJ Spoony; DJ EZ; Karl 'tuff enuff' Brown; Steve Sutherland |
| Best Eclectic/Experimental DJ | Special Awards |
| (United Kingdom) Coldcut - Winner; Dj Spooky; Dj Morpheus; Mr. Scruff; Kid Koala | Best Ibiza Bar: with "Bacardi Breezer"Mambo - Winner; Best Ibiza DJ: (United Kingdom) Pete Gooding - Winner; Best Track of the Season: (United Kingdom) Tim Deluxe for "It Just Won't Do" - Winner; Best Set of the Season: (United States) Danny Tenaglia- Winner; Best Re-Mix of the Year (Netherlands) Junkie XL V's Elvis - Winner; Best Newcomer: (Spain) Wally Lopez - Winner; Best International DJ: (United States) Erick Morillo - Winner; Outstanding Dedication: (United States) Judy Weinstein (Def Mix Record Label); Outstanding Contribution: (United Kingdom) Pete Tong - Winner |

=== 2003 ===
The 6th edition winners nominees and recipients were chosen from 9 categories.

| Best House DJ | Best Techno DJ |
|---|---|
| (United States) Erick Morillo - Winner; Deep Dish; Roger Sanchez; Louie Vega; David Morales | (Germany) Sven Väth - Winner; Jim Masters; Richie Hawtin; Jeff Mills; Carl Cox |
| Best Techouse/Progressive DJ | BestHip Hop/R 'N' B/Garage DJ |
| (United Kingdom) Steve Lawler - Winner; Sasha; Darren Emerson; Timo Maas; John Digweed | (United Kingdom) Tim Westwood - Winner; Trevor Nelson; DJ Spoony; MJ Cole; Matt Jam Lamont |
| Best Psychedelic Trance DJ | Best Newcomer DJ |
| (United Kingdom) Hallucinogen - Winner; Raja Ram; Max Lanfranconi; GSM(Riktam y Banzi); Frank E | (Italy) Junior Jack& Kid Creme - Winner; Fergie; Sarah Main; James Zabiela; Powered by Red Bull |
| Best Ibiza DJ | Best Ibiza Bar |
| (Spain) Reche - Winner; Andy Baxter; Angel Linde; Tania Vulcano Jonathan; Ulysses | (Spain) Base Bar - Winner; Rock Bar; Bar M; Mambo; Km5 |
| Special Awards | Special Awards |
| Best Track of the Season: (Italy) Junior Jack for ""E-Samba" - Winner; Best Technology: (Japan) Pioneer - Winner; Best Art Design: (United Kingdom) Ross Kirton for Pure Pacha - Winner; Best Ibiza Night: (United Kingdom) Manumission - Winner | Best International DJ: (United States) Jeff Mills - Winner; Outstanding Dedication: (Spain) Pepe Rosello - Winner; Outstanding Achievement: (Spain) Máxima FM - Winner |

=== 2004 ===
The 7th edition winners nominees and recipients were chosen from 9 categories.'

| Best House DJ | Best Techno DJ |
|---|---|
| (United States) Roger Sanchez - Winner; Deep Dish; Erick Morillo; Junior Jack & Kid Creme; David Morales; Claudio Coccoluto | (Japan) Ken Ishii - Winner; Sven Väth; Richie Hawtin; Jeff Mills; Carl Cox |
| Best Techouse/Progressive DJ | BestHip Hop/R 'N' B/Garage DJ |
| (United Kingdom) Steve Lawler - Winner; Sasha; Satoshi Tomiie; Timo Maas; Wally Lopez; Danny Howells | (United Kingdom) Trevor Nelson - Winner; Tim Westwood; DJ Spoony; Mark Ronson; DJ Scream |
| Best Trance DJ | Best Newcomer DJ |
| (United Kingdom) Paul Oakenfold - Winner; Armin van Buuren; Tiësto; Paul van Dyk; Ferry Corsten | (Italy) Nic Fanciulli - Winner; Audio Bullys; Behrouz; Demi; Aldrin |
| Best Ibiza DJ | Best Ibiza Bar |
| (Uruguay) Tania Vulcano - Winner; Andy Baxter; Sarah Main; DJ Oliver; Cesar del Rio | (Spain) Dome - Winner; Rock Bar; Sa Trincha; Mambo; Km5 |
| Special Awards | Special Awards |
| Best Ibiza Night: (Spain) Subliminal - Winner; Best Technology: (Netherlands) Final Scratch Stanton - Winner; Best Art Design: (United Kingdom) Adam Shepherd for Pure Pacha - Winner; Tribute: (United States) Angel Alvarez - Winner | Best Set of the Season: (France) Martin Solveig at Defected Winner; Best Track of the Season: (United Kingdom) The Shapeshifters for ""Lola's Theme" - Winner; Best International DJ: (Netherlands) Tiësto - Winner; Outstanding Dedication: (United Kingdom) Darren Hughes - Winner; Outstanding Contribution: (United Kingdom) Paul Oakenfold - Winner |

=== 2005 ===
The 8th edition winners nominees and recipients were chosen from 10 categories.

| Best House DJ | Best Techno DJ |
|---|---|
| (Italy) Junior Jack & Kid Creme - Winner; Roger Sanchez; Erick Morillo; Martin Solveig; David Morales; Bob Sinclar | (Italy) Mauro Picotto - Winner; Sven Väth; Richie Hawtin; Chris Liebing; Carl Cox |
| Best Tech House/Progressive DJ | Best Urban DJ |
| (United Kingdom) Steve Lawler - Winner; Sasha; Satoshi Tomiie; Hernan Cattaneo; John Digweed | (France) Cut Killer - Winner; Tim Westwood; Trevor Nelson; Mark Ronson; Steve Sutherland |
| Best Trance DJ | Best Newcomer DJ |
| (Netherlands) Ferry Corsten - Winner; Armin van Buuren; Tiësto; Paul van Dyk; Paul Oakenfold | (Greece) / (Sweden) Steve Angello - Winner; Sebastian Ingrosso; Desyn Masiello; Dan Ghenacia; 2ManyDJs |
| Best Ibiza DJ | Best Ibiza Bar |
| (Spain) DJ Oliver - Winner; Loco Dice; Smokin Jo & Tim Sheridan; Andy B; Sebastian Gamboa | (Spain) Rock Bar - Winner; Café del Mar; Blue Marlin; El Ayoun; Bora Bora |
| Break Through | Special Awards |
| (United Kingdom) / (Australia) BodyRockers - Winners; Benny Benassi; Tiefschwarz; Christopher Lawrence | Best Ibiza Night: (Spain) Ibiza Rocks - Winner; Best Technology Product: (Japan) Pioneer - Winner; Best Art Design: (Sweden) Hjordis Fogelberg for Manumission - Winner; Special: (Argentina) Alfredo - Winner |
| Special Awards | Special Awards |
| Best Urban Set: (Hong Kong) DJ Jekey; Best Set of the Season: (United Kingdom) Groove Armada at Space - Winner; Best Track of the Season: (Germany) M.A.N.D.Y. V Booka Shade for ""Body Language" - Winner; Best International DJ: (United States) Erick Morillo - Winner | Honorific: (Spain) Cesar de Melero - Dj Pippi - Winners; Outstanding Dedication: (United Kingdom) DJ Magazine - Winner; Outstanding Contribution: (United Kingdom) Radio 1 - Winner; Lifetime Achievement: (United Kingdom) Danny Rampling Winner |

=== 2006 ===
The 9th edition winners nominees and recipients were chosen from 10 categories.

| Best House DJ | Best Techno DJ |
|---|---|
| (France) Bob Sinclar - Winner; Roger Sanchez; Erick Morillo; David Guetta; Louie Vega | (United Kingdom) Richie Hawtin - Winner; John Acquaviva; Sven Väth; Chris Liebing; Carl Cox |
| Best Tech House/Progressive DJ | Best Urban DJ |
| (United Kingdom) John Digweed - Winner; Sasha; Steve Lawler; Deep Dish; Sander Kleinenberg | (United States) DJ Jazzy Jeff - Winner; DJ Yoda; Cash Money; Trevor Nelson; Mark Ronson |
| Best Trance DJ | Best Newcomer DJ |
| (Germany) Paul van Dyk - Winner; Armin van Buuren; Tiësto; Ferry Corsten; Paul Oakenfold | (United Kingdom) Paul Woolford - Winner; Guido Schneider; Eddie Halliwell; SOS ( Desyn Masiello & Omid 16B & Demi); Damian Lazarus |
| Best Ibiza DJ | Best Ibiza Bar |
| (Australia) Sarah Main - Winner; Ricardo Villalobos; Willie Graff; Graham Sahara; Jon Sa Trinxa | (Spain) Underground - Winner; Plastik; Grial; Mambo; L'Elephant |
| Break Through | Special Awards |
| (Switzerland) Cem Berter aka Jamie Lewis Winner; Trentemøller; Tiefschwarz; MYNC Project; Groove Junkies | Best Ibiza Night: (United Kingdom) Carl Cox Global at Space - Winner; Best Technology-Supported by DJ Mag: (Japan) Pioneer - Winner; Best Art Design: (Spain) Pure Pacha - Winner; Best Breakthrough Act: (Switzerland) Cem Berter aka Jamie Lewis - Winner; Best Track of the Season: (France) Bob Sinclar featuring (United Kingdom) Steve Edwards for ""World Hold On" - Winners; Best International DJ: (United States) Erick Morillo - Winner; Outstanding Dedication: (Spain) Brasilio - Winner; Outstanding Contribution: (Spain) Sónar Music Festival - Winner |

=== 2007 ===
The 10th Anniversary edition winners nominees and recipients were chosen from 12 categories.

| Best House DJ | Best Techno DJ |
|---|---|
| (United States) Roger Sanchez - Winner; Bob Sinclar; Erick Morillo; Louie Vega; David Morales | (Spain) Cristian Varela - Winner; Pascal FEOS; Sven Väth; DJ Hell; Carl Cox |
| Best Tech House/Progressive DJ | Best Urban DJ |
| (Netherlands) Sander Kleinenberg - Winner; Sasha; 1 to 1; Steve Lawler; Satoshi Tomiie; Sander Kleinenberg | (Spain) Mucho Muchacho - Winner; Cut Killer; Dan Williams; Trevor Nelson; Mark Ronson |
| Best Trance DJ | Best Newcomer DJ |
| (Netherlands) Ferry Corsten - Winner; Armin van Buuren; Astrix; Infected Mushroom; Above & Beyond | (Sweden) Axwell - Winner; Calvin Harris; Pig & Dan; Pasta Boys; D-Nox & Beckers |
| Best Ibiza DJ | Best Ibiza Bar |
| (Spain) Sebastian Gamboa - Winner.; Nima Gorji; Pepo Lanzoni; Tomas Hedberg; Nano Vergel | (Spain) Mambo - Winner; Bar M; Guarana; Grial; Electric Cabaret Bar (Es Vive) |
| Break Through | Best Electro DJ |
| (Netherlands) Fedde Le Grand - Winner; Richard Grey; Tiefschwarz; 2 Many DJ's; Mark Knight | (Denmark) Trentemøller - Winner; M.A.N.D.Y.; Felix Da Housecat; Tiga; Steve Bug |
| Best International Dance Music Festival | Special Awards |
| (Spain) Monegros Desert Festival - Winner; Bestival UK; Dance Valley; Global Gathering UK; Ultra Music Festival | Best Ibiza Night: (Spain) F**K Me I'm Famous - Winner; Best Technology: (Germany) Ableton Live - Winner; Best Media Company: (Spain) DEEJAY Dance Magazine Official; Best Track of the Season: (Netherlands) Axwell for "I Found U" - Winner; Best Set of the Season: (United States) Steve Aoki at Ibiza Rocks - Winner; Best International DJ: (France) David Guetta - Winner; Outstanding Contribution: Made In Italy - Winner; Lifetime Achievement: (Germany) Dr Motte - Love Parade - Winner |

=== 2008 ===
The 11th edition winners nominees and recipients were chosen from 16 categories.

| Best House DJ | Best Techno DJ |
|---|---|
| (France) David Guetta - Winner; Bob Sinclar; Axwell; Fedde Le Grand; Roger Sanchez; David Morales; Steve Angello; Sebastian Ingrosso | (United Kingdom) Richie Hawtin - Winner; Jeff Mills; Sven Väth; DJ Hell; Carl Cox; Ricardo Villalobos; Cristian Varela; Pig And Dan; Umek |
| Best Tech House/Progressive DJ | Best Electro House |
| (United Kingdom) Steve Lawler - Winner; Dubfire; Tania Vulcano; Luciano; Damian Lazarus; Marco Carola; Len Faki | (Canada) Deadmau5 - Winner; Felix Da Housecat; Erick Prydz; Mark Knight; James Zabiela; Trentemøller; Layo And Bushwacka; Benny Benassi |
| Best Trance DJ | Best Newcomer DJ |
| (Netherlands) Armin van Buuren - Winner; Ferry Corsten; Tiësto; Paul Oakenfold; Paul Van Dyk; Above & Beyond; Markus Schulz; BT | (United Kingdom) Funkagenda - Winner; Manuel Tur; Dusty Kid; Audiofly; Marcooz; Joris Voorn; Phunk Investigation; Adam K |
| Best Ibiza Resident DJ | Best Minimal DJ |
| (Spain) Valentin Huedo - Winner; Pepo Lanzoni; Arian 911; Jon Sa Trinxa; Nima Gorji; Angel Linde; Mart-t; Hoffer 66 | (Sweden) Adam Beyer - Winner; Anja Schneider; Loco Dice; Steve Bug; Matthias Tanzmann; Shlomi Aber; Michael Mayer; Guy Gerber |
| Break Through | Best Hip Hop DJ |
| (Netherlands) Sander Van Doorn - Winner; Deadmau5; Luciano; Dirty South; Hot Chip; Loco Dice; Laidback Luke; Magda | (Spain) Mucho Muchacho - Winner; Peanut Butter Wolf; DJ Food; Kentaro; Bobby Corridor; DJ Des (Detroit); Teddy-o; Jaguar Skillz |
| Best Progressive House | Best Deep House DJ |
| (United Kingdom) Sasha - Winner; Danny Tenaglia; Harry Lemon; John Digweed; Nick Warren; Hernan Cattaneo; D-Nox & Beckers; John Dahlbäck | (Germany) Phonique - Winner; Ben Watt; Charles Webster; Jimpster; Francois Kevorkian; Miguel Migs; Vincenzo; Jay-J |
| Best Downtempo & Eclectic DJ | Dance Nation of the Year |
| (Germany) Jazzanova - Winner; Rob Da Bank; Tom Middleton; Mixmaster Morris; Df Tram; Giles Peterson; Jose Padilla; Pathaan | Brazil - Winner; DJ Marky; Gui Boratto; Mary Zander; DJ Ingrid; Paulo Boghosian; Daniel Kuhnen; DJ Joe K; Tikos Groove |
| Best International DJ | Special Awards |
| (Netherlands) Tiësto - Winner; Sasha; Carl Cox; Roger Sanchez; David Guetta; Sander Kleinenberg; Sven Vath; Erick Morillo | Best Ibiza Night: - (Spain) Cocoon - Winner; Best Ibiza Set: - (Spain) Luciano & Ricardo Villalobos - "Cocoon" - Winner; Best Ibiza Trak: - (United Kingdom) Mark Knight & Funkagenda - "Man With The Red Face" - Winner; Best Media Award: - (Australia) Resident Advisor - Winner; Best Vinyl Player Innovation: - (Germany) Traktor Scratch - Native Instruments - Winner; Best CD Player Innovation: - (Japan) CDJ-400 - Pioneer - Winner; Best DJ Software Production Tool: (Germany) - Cubase 4 - Steinberg - Winner; Best DJ Software Performance Tool: (Germany) - Live 7 - Ableton - Winner; Best Mp3 Player: (Sweden) - Pacemaker - Winner; Best DJ Mixer: (Japan) - SVM-1000 - Pioneer - Winner; Best International Dance Music Festival: (United States) Ultra Music Festival (Miami) - Winner; Outstanding Contribution: (United States) Billy Kelly WMC - Winner; Outstanding Dedication: (United States) Jonas Temple - Beatport - Winner |

=== 2009 ===
The 12th edition winners nominees and recipients were chosen from 14 categories.

| Best House DJ | Best Techno DJ |
|---|---|
| (France) David Guetta - Winner; Bob Sinclar; Axwell; Fedde Le Grand; Laidback Luke; David Morales; Steve Angello; Sebastian Ingrosso | (Germany) Sven Väth - Winner; Richie Hawtin; Luciano; Carl Cox; Ricardo Villalobos; Cristian Varela; Umek; Pig & Dan |
| Best Tech House DJ | Best Electro House |
| (Netherlands) Marco V - Winner; Dubfire; Funkagenda; Laurent Garnier; M.A.N.D.Y.; Marco Carola; Steve Lawler; Radio Slave | (Netherlands) Sander van Doorn - Winner; Benny Benassi; Erick Prydz; Deadmau5; James Zabiela; Mark Knight; Layo And Bushwacka; Sebastien Leger |
| Best Trance DJ | Best Newcomer DJ |
| (Netherlands) Armin van Buuren - Winner; Ferry Corsten; Tiësto; Paul Oakenfold; Paul Van Dyk; Above And Beyond; ATB; Markus Schulz | (France) Popof - Winner; Anderson Noise; Andy Moor; Ellen Allien; Gabe; Hervé; Minilogue; Riktam & Bansi |
| Best Progressive House DJ | Best Minimal DJ |
| (United Kingdom) Sasha - Winner; Danny Howells; Eddie Halliwell; Hernán Cattáneo; John Dahlback; John Digweed; Nick Warren; Lee Burridge | (Israel) Guy Gerber - Winner; Adam Beyer; Anja Schneider; Loco Dice; Magda; Matthias Tanzmann; Michael Mayer; Steve Bug |
| Break Through | Best Deep House DJ |
| (Netherlands) Joris Voorn - Winner; Marcel Dettmann; Dixon; Jamie Jones; Kaskade; Matthew Dear; Nick Curly; Valentino Kanzyani | (United Kingdom) Milton Jackson - Winner; Ben Watt; Charles Webster; Dennis Ferrer; Efdemin; Jimpster; Phonique; Vincenzo |
| Best Downtempo & Eclectic DJ | Best Psychedelic Trance DJ |
| (United Kingdom) Rob da Bank - Winner; DJ Ravin; Gilles Peterson; Jazzanova; José Padilla; Mixmaster Morris; Nightmares on Wax; Thievery Corporation | (Netherlands) GMS - Winner; Ace Ventura; Astrix; Infected Mushroom; Liquid Soul; Perfect Stranger; Skazi; Yahel |
| Best International DJ | Special Awards |
| (Netherlands) Armin van Buuren - Winner; Carl Cox; Tiësto; David Guetta; Sander Kleinenberg; Sven Vath; Erick Morillo | Best Ibiza Night: - (Spain) F**K Me I'm Famous - Winner; Best Ibiza Set: - (Spain) Luciano & (Germany) Sven Väth (B2B) - Cadenza residency at Ushuaia - Winners; Best Ibiza Resident DJ: - (Sweden) Tomas Hedberg - Winner; Best Media Award: - (Spain) Ibiza Voice - Winner; Best Dance Nation of the Year: - Russia - Winner; Best International Dance Music Festival: (United Kingdom) Bestival - Winner; Outstanding Contribution: (United Kingdom) International Music Summit - Winner; Outstanding Dedication: (Spain) Jose Pascual "Mr.Papy" - DJ Awards (Founder) - Winner |

=== 2010 ===
The 13th edition winners nominees and recipients were chosen from 14 categories.

| Best House DJ | Best Techno DJ |
|---|---|
| (Sweden) Axwell - Joint Winner; (Greece) / (Sweden) Steve Angello - Joint Winner; (Sweden) Sebastian Ingrosso - Joint Winner; Laidback Luke; Bob Sinclar; Roger Sanchez; David Guetta; Erick Morillo | (Netherlands) Marco V - Winner; Jeff Mills; Richie Hawtin; Carl Cox; Ricardo Villalobos; Cristian Varela; Sven Väth; Umek |
| Best Tech House DJ | Best Electro House |
| (Switzerland) Luciano - Winner; Dubfire; Joris Voorn; Laurent Garnier; M.A.N.D.Y.; Layo & Bushwacka; Steve Lawler; Radio Slave; Paul Woolford | (Canada) Deadmau5 - Winner; Sander van Doorn; Benny Benassi; James Zabiela; Mark Knight; Fedde Le Grand; Eddie Halliwell |
| Best Trance DJ | Best Newcomer DJ |
| (Netherlands) Armin van Buuren - Winner; Ferry Corsten; Tiësto; Paul Oakenfold; Paul Van Dyk; Above And Beyond; ATB; Gareth Emery; Markus Schulz | (Germany) Stimming - Winner; Alan Fitzpatrick; Anderson Noise; Ekkohaus; Reboot; Tim Green; Wolfgang Gartner |
| Best Progressive House DJ | Best Minimal DJ |
| (United Kingdom) Sasha - Joint Winner; (Germany) D-Nox & Beckers - Joint Winner; Eric Prydz; Hernán Cattáneo; John Dahlback; John Digweed; Nick Warren; Sander Kleinenberg | (Germany) Loco Dice - Winner; Guy Gerber; Adam Beyer; Magda; Matthias Tanzmann; Michael Mayer; Steve Bug; Minilogue |
| Break Through | Best Deep House DJ |
| (Italy) Riva Starr - Winner; Dixon; Gui Boratto; Kaskade; Marcel Dettmann; Raresh; Seth Troxler; Zip | (Germany) Phonique - Winner; Milton Jackson; Ben Watt; Charles Webster; Dennis Ferrer; Francois Kevorkian; Jimpster; Kevin Yost |
| Best Downtempo & Eclectic DJ | Best Psychedelic Trance DJ |
| (United Kingdom) Mixmaster Morris - Winner; DJ Ravin; Gilles Peterson; Jazzanova; José Padilla; Rob da Bank; Nightmares on Wax; Thievery Corporation | (United States) Liquid Soul - Winner; Ace Ventura; Astrix; Infected Mushroom; Liquid Soul; Perfect Stranger; Skazi; Yahel; GMS |
| Best International DJ | Special Awards |
| (Canada) Deadmau5 - Winner; Armin van Buuren; Carl Cox; Tiësto; David Guetta; Paul van Dyk; Sven Vath; Richie Hawtin | Best Ibiza Night: - (Spain) Masquerade Motel by SHM - Winner; Best Ibiza Resident DJ: - (Iran) Nima Gorji - Winner; Best Track of the Season: - (Germany) "No Worries" by Butch - Winner; Best Technology: - (Japan) Pioneer - Winner; Best Media Award: - (Spain) Ibiza Sonica Radio - Winner; Best Dance Nation of the Year: - Egypt (Aly & Fila) - Winner; Best International Dance Music Festival: (Ukraine) KaZantip - Winner; Outstanding Dedication: (United Kingdom) Ben Turner - Graphite - Winner; Outstanding Achievement : (United Kingdom) Andy McKay for Ibiza Rocks - Winner; Lifetime Achievement: (United Kingdom) Mike Pickering - Winner |

=== 2011 ===
The 14th edition winners nominees and recipients were chosen from 12 categories.

| Best House DJ | Best Techno DJ |
|---|---|
| (Sweden) Axwell - Winner; Mark Knight; Bob Sinclar; Dirty South; David Guetta; Erick Morillo; Sebastian Ingrosso; Steve Angello | (United Kingdom) Carl Cox - Winner; Adam Beyer; Carl Craig; Josh Wink; Richie Hawtin; Marco Carola; Sven Väth; Umek |
| Best Tech House DJ | Best Electro House |
| (Switzerland) Luciano - Winner; Dubfire; Eric Prydz; James Zabiela; Loco Dice; Steve Lawler; Layo & Bushwacka | (Canada) Deadmau5 - Winner; Calvin Harris; Benny Benassi; Afro Jack; James Zabiela; Fat Boy Slim; Pete Tong; Eddie Halliwell |
| Best Trance DJ | Best Newcomer DJ |
| (Netherlands) Armin van Buuren - Winner; Ferry Corsten; Tiësto; Paul Oakenfold; Paul Van Dyk; Sander van Doorn; Gareth Emery; Markus Schulz | (United Kingdom) Maya Jane Coles - Winner; Avicii; Dani Casarano; Kio Dj; Jozif; Nina Kraviz; Sunnery James & Ryan Marciano; tINI |
| Best Urban DJ | Best Eclectic House DJ |
| (France) Cut Killer - Winner; Benga; Chase & Status; DJ Skream; DJ Fresh; Joy Orbison; Scuba; Sub Focus | (Belgium) 2ManyDJ's - Winner; Guy Gerber; Annie Mac; Boys Noize; Damian Lazarus; Guy Gerber; Seth Troxler; Steve Aoki; Trentemøller |
| Best Down Tempo DJ | Best Deep House DJ |
| (United Kingdom) Nightmares on Wax - Winner; Dixon; Gui Boratto; Kaskade; Marcel Dettmann; Raresh; Seth Troxler; Zip | (United Kingdom) Jamie Jones - Winner; Milton Jackson; Ben Watt; Charles Webster; Dennis Ferrer; Francois Kevorkian; Jimpster; Kevin Yost |
| Best International DJ | Special Awards |
| (Netherlands) Armin van Buuren - Winner; Carl Cox; Tiësto; David Guetta; Luciano; Sven Vath; Swedish House Mafia | Best Ibiza Night: - (United Kingdom) Carl Cox 10 Years of Revolution at Space - Winner; Track of the Season: - (Canada) Azari & III "Hungry for the Power” (Jamie; Jones Remix) and (United Kingdom) Jamie Woon “Lady Luck” (Luciano remix) - Joint Winner's: Best Remixer: (Netherlands) Afrojack - Winner; Best Cutting Edge Product: (United States) Traktor - Winner; Best Ibiza Resident DJ: - (Spain) Mar-T - Winner; Best Live Performance: - (United Kingdom) Madness at Ibiza Rocks - Winner; Best Media Award: - (United Kingdom) Tilllate - Winner; Best Dance Nation of the Year: - United States David Morales - Winner; Best International Dance Music Festival: (United States) Electric Daisy Carnival - Winner; Outstanding Achievement : (United Kingdom) Pete Tong - Winner |

=== 2012 ===
The 15th edition winners nominees and recipients were chosen from 11 categories.

| Best Deep House DJ | Best Techno DJ |
|---|---|
| (United States) Maceo Plex - Winner; Dan Ghencia; Dixon; Dyed Soundorom; Jamie Jones; Kerri Chandler; Matthias Tanzmann; Maya Jane Coles; Solomun | (United Kingdom) Carl Cox - Winner; Adam Beyer; Carl Craig; Josh Wink; Richie Hawtin; Umek; Sven Väth; Umek |
| Best Tech House DJ | Best Electro House |
| (United States) Seth Troxler - Winner; Audiofly; Dubfire; James Zabiela; Joris Voorn; Loco Dice; Luciano; Marco Carola; Pete Tong; Nick Curly | (Netherlands) Tiësto - Winner; Deadmau5; Calvin Harris; Chuckie; Afro Jack; Avicii; Axwell; David Guetta; Sebastian Ingrosso; Steve Angello |
| Best Trance DJ | Best Newcomer DJ |
| (Netherlands) Armin van Buuren - Winner; Ferry Corsten; Above & Beyond; Paul Oakenfold; Paul Van Dyk; Judge Jules; Gareth Emery; Markus Schulz | (Russia) Arty - Winner; Eats Everything; Hardwell; Miguel Campbell; R3hab; Soulclap; Subb-an; Tale Of Us |
| Best Down Tempo DJ | Best Dub Step/Bass DJ |
| (United Kingdom) Nightmares On Wax - Winner; Chris Coco; Gilles Peterson; Heritage Project; Jon Sa Trinxa; Rob da Bank; Mr Scruff | (United Kingdom) Chase & Status - Winner; DJ Fresh; Skream; Skrillex; Nero; Pendulum; Sub Focus |
| Best International DJ | Best Electronic Live Performance |
| (Netherlands) Armin Van Buuren - Winner; Carl Cox; Avicii; David Guetta; Deadmau5; Swedish House Mafia; Skrillex; Sven Väth; Tiësto | (United Kingdom) Faithless - Winner; Azari & III; dOP; Goldfish; Guy Gerber; Hot Chip; Laurent Garnier; Nicolas Jaar; Paul Kalkbrenner; Sneaky Sound System |
| Special Awards | Special Awards |
| Best Ibiza Night: - (Spain) Vagabundos & Enter - Joint Winner's; Best Track of the Season: - (Italy) 'Party Non Stop by Pirupa - Winner; Best Producer: (Bosnia and Herzegovina) Solomun - Winner; Best Cutting Edge Product: (Sweden) SoundCloud - Winner; Best Ibiza DJ: - (United Kingdom) Andy Baxter - Winner | Best Ibiza Live Performance: - (United States) Lenny Kravitz at Ibiza 123 - Winner; Best Media Award: - (Spain) Pacha Magazine - Winner; Best Dance Nation of the Year: - Australia Nervo - Winner; Best International Dance Music Festival: (Belgium) Tomorrowland - Winner |

=== 2013 ===
The 16th edition winners nominees and recipients were chosen from 10 categories.

| Best Deep House DJ | Best Techno DJ |
|---|---|
| (Bosnia and Herzegovina) Solomun - Winner; Maceo Plex; Art Department; Dixon; Damian Lazarus; Jamie Jones; Kerri Chandler; Tale of Us; Maya Jane Coles; Matthias Tanzmann | (Spain) Cristian Varela - Winner; Carl Cox - Winner; Carl Craig; Umek; Sven Väth; Umek; Joseph Capriati; Nicole Moudaber; Paco Osuna; Richie Hawtin |
| Best Tech House DJ | Best Electro House |
| (Switzerland) Luciano - Winner; Seth Troxler; Audiofly; Dubfire; Loco Dice; Joris Voorn; Maceo Plex; John Digweed; Cassy; Sasha; Pete Tong; Seth Troxler | (Netherlands) Hardwell - Winner; Calvin Harris; Chuckie; Afro Jack; Avicii; Axwell; David Guetta; Sebastian Ingrosso; Steve Angello; Steve Aoki |
| Best Trance DJ | Best Newcomer DJ |
| (Netherlands) Armin van Buuren - Winner; Ferry Corsten; Above & Beyond; Paul Oakenfold; Paul Van Dyk; Markus Schulz; Dash Berlin; Aly & Fila | (Spain) Üner - Winner; Andrea Oliva; Dannic; Francesca Lombardo; Hector; Hot Since 82; Mano Le Tough; Omnia |
| Best Dub Step/Bass DJ | Best International DJ |
| (Australia) Knife Party - Winner; Skrillex; Skream; Chase & Status; Nero; Pendulum; Sub Focus | (Netherlands) Armin van Buuren - Winner; Afrojack; Avicii; Carl Cox; David Guetta; Luciano; Richie Hawtin; Steve Aoki; Tiësto; Sven Väth |
| Best Electronic Live Performance | Special Awards |
| (United States) / (United Kingdom) Hot Natured - Winner; A Guy Called Gerald; A*M*E; Gaiser; Guti; Guy Gerber; Martin Buttrich; Paul Kalkbrenner; Tensnake | Best Ibiza Night: - (Spain) Enter - Winner; Best Track of the Season: - (Italy) 'Paper Aeroplane' by Francesco Rossi - Winner; Best Producer: - (Cuba) Maceo Plex - Winner; Best Cutting Edge Product: - (Japan) Pioneer CDJ2000nexus - Winner; Best Ibiza DJ: - (Spain) Willy Graff - Winner; Best Ibiza Live Performance: - (United States) Lenny Kravitz at Ibiza 123 - Winner; Best Media Award: - (Germany) Boiler Room TV - Winner; Best Dance Nation of the Year: - Mexico Hector - Winner; Best International Dance Music Festival: - (Mexico) The BPM Festival - Winner; Best Breakthrough Artist: - (Italy) tINI - Winner; Outstanding Contribution: - (United States) Kathy Sledge - Winner |

=== 2014 ===
The 17th edition winners nominees and recipients were chosen from 12 categories.

| Best Deep House DJ | Best Techno DJ |
|---|---|
| (United Kingdom) Jamie Jones - Winner; Maceo Plex; Art Department; Dixon; Tale of Us; Maya Jane Coles; Matthias Tanzmann; Nick Curly; Apollonia | (United Kingdom) Carl Cox - Winner; Ricardo Villalobos; Chris Liebing; Sven Väth; Nicole Moudaber; Paco Osuna; Richie Hawtin |
| Best Tech House DJ | Best Electro House |
| (Switzerland) Luciano - Winner; Seth Troxler; Eats Everything; Loco Dice; Joris Voorn; Hot Since 82; Seth Troxler; Maceo Plex; Üner; Nina Kraviz | (Netherlands) Hardwell - Winner; Calvin Harris; Dimitri Vegas & Like Mike; Avicii; David Guetta; Steve Aoki; Nicky Romero; NERVO; Zedd; Mike |
| Best Trance DJ | Best Newcomer DJ |
| (Netherlands) Armin van Buuren - Winner; Ferry Corsten; Above & Beyond; Markus Schulz; Dash Berlin; Aly & Fila; W&W | (United Kingdom) Patrick Topping - Winner; Bella Sarris; Citizen; JackMaster; Kove; My Nu Leng; Sidney Charles |
| Best Dub Step/Bass DJ | Best International DJ |
| (United States) Skrillex - Winner; Andy C; Knife Party; Chase & Status; Nero; Netsky; Sub Focus | (United Kingdom) Carl Cox - Winner; Armin van Buuren; Fat Boy Slim; Avicii; Carl Cox; David Guetta; Richie Hawtin; Steve Aoki; Tiësto; Skrillex |
| Best Electronic Live Performance | Best Electronica DJ |
| (United Kingdom) Disclosure - Winner; A Guy Called Gerald; A*M*E; Bonobo; Matador; Darkside; Recondite; Kink | (United States) Diplo - Winner; Hercules & Love Affair; Jamie xx; John Talabot; Pretty Lights; Todd Terje; Totally Enormous Extinct Dinosaurs; Nightmares on Wax |
| Special Awards | Special Awards |
| Best Ibiza Night: - (Spain) Flower Power - Winner; Best Track of the Season: - (United Kingdom) 'Forget by Patrick Topping - Winner; Best Producer: - (United States) MK - Winner; Best Cutting Edge Product: - (Germany) Native Instruments - Winner; Best Ibiza DJ: - (Spain) Iban Mendoza - Winner; Best Ibiza Live Performance: - (Spain) Matador - Winner | Best Media Award: - (United Kingdom) BE-AT.TV - Winner; Best Dance Nation of the Year: - Croatia - Winner; Best International Dance Music Festival: - (United Kingdom) Creamfields - Winner; Best Record Label of the Year: - (United States) Innervisions - Winner; Outstanding Contribution: - (United Kingdom) DJ Harvey - Winner |

=== 2015 ===
The 18th edition winners nominees and recipients were chosen from 11 categories.

| Best Deep House DJ | Best Techno DJ |
|---|---|
| (Bosnia and Herzegovina) Solomun - Winner; ÂME; Art Department; Dixon; Duke Dumont; Maya Jane Coles; Dusky; Mano Le Tough; Oliver Dollar | (United Kingdom) Carl Cox - Winner; Seth Troxler; Adam Beyer; Sven Väth; Ricardo Villalobos; Tale of Us; Richie Hawtin; Nina Kraviz; Chris Liebing; Joseph Capriati |
| Best Tech House DJ | Best Electro/Progressive House |
| (Switzerland) Luciano and (United Kingdom) Hot Since 82 - Joint-Winners; Apollonia; Eats Everything; Loco Dice; Jamie Jones; Seth Troxler; Maceo Plex; The Martinez Brothers; Steve Lawler | (Netherlands) Hardwell - Winner; Calvin Harris; Dimitri Vegas & Like Mike; Avicii; Martin Garrix; Steve Aoki; Tiësto; Oliver Heldens; Zedd; W&W; R3hab; Showtek |
| Best Trance DJ | Best Newcomer DJ |
| (Netherlands) Armin van Buuren - Winner; Ferry Corsten; Above & Beyond; Markus Schulz; Dash Berlin; Aly & Fila; Paul van Dyk | (Spain) Cuartero - Winner; Boddika; Eli & Fur; Leon Vynehall; Low Steppa; Shanti Celeste; Watermat; Darryn McGarry |
| Best Bass DJ | Best International DJ |
| (United Kingdom) Hannah Wants - Winner; Andy C; Knife Party; Chase & Status; Skrillex; Netsky; Nero; Sub Focus; Sigma | (Netherlands) Hardwell - Winner; Armin van Buuren; Carl Cox; Avicii; Dimitri Vegas & Like Mike; David Guetta; Martin Garrix; Steve Aoki; Calvin Harris; Jamie Jones; Sven Vath |
| Best Breakthrough DJ | Best Electronica DJ |
| (South Africa) Black Coffee - Winner; B Traits; Ben UFO; Ummet Ozcan; Motor City Drum; Daniel Avery; Richy Ahmed; Catz 'n' Dogz; Rødhåd; Ensemble; Los Suruba; Darryn McGarry | (United Kingdom) Disclosure - Winner; Bonobo; Jamie xx; John Talabot; Four Tet; The 2 Bears; Gorgon City; Caribou |
| Special Awards | Special Awards |
| Best Electronic Live Performance: - (United Kingdom) Faithless at BBC Radio 1 20-Ibiza Rocks - Winner; Best Producer: - (United Kingdom) Claptone - Winner; Best Cutting Edge Product: - (Japan) Rekordbox - Winner; Best Ibiza DJ: Powered by Vicious Magazine- (Spain) – Manu Gonzalez - Winner; Best Ibiza Music Event: - (Spain) IMS Dalt Vila Festival - Winner | Best Ibiza Night: - (Spain) Acid Sundays - Winner; Best Dance Nation of the Year: - South Africa - Winner; Best Record Label of the Year: - (Italy) Life and Death - Winner; Electronic Music Pioneer: - (United States) Arthur Baker - Winner |

=== 2016 ===
The 19th edition winners nominees and recipients were chosen from 13 categories.

| Best Deep House DJ | Best Techno DJ |
|---|---|
| (South Africa) Black Coffee - Winner; &ME; Adam Port; Andhim; Blond:ish; Catz’N Dogz; Dixon; Duke Dumont; MK; Sonny Fodera | (United Kingdom) Carl Cox - Winner; Richie Hawtin; Carl Craig; Adam Beyer; Sven Väth; Dubfire; Joseph Capriati; Nicole Moudaber; Nina Kraviz; Pan-Pot; Ricardo Villalobos; Tale of US |
| Best Tech House DJ | Best Big Room House DJ (new category) |
| (United States) The Martinez Brothers - Winner; Apollonia; Hot Since 82; Loco Dice; Jamie Jones; Sasha; Maceo Plex; Luciano; Mano Le Tough; Nic Fanciulli; Solomun | (Netherlands) Hardwell - Winner; Avicii; David Guetta; Dimitri Vegas & Like Mike; Nervo; Axwell and Ingrosso; Martin Garrix; Nicky Romero; Tiësto; Oliver Heldens |
| Best Trance DJ | Best Newcomer DJ |
| (Netherlands) Armin van Buuren - Winner; Above & Beyond; Gareth Emery; Bryan Kearney; Aly & Fila; Paul van Dyk; John O'Callaghan; Cosmic Gate | (Greece) Mihalis Safras - Winner; 2Vilas; Archie Hamilton; Bedouin; Detlef; Julian Perez; Nastia; MAT.JOE; Will Clarke; Monki |
| Best Bass DJ | Best International DJ |
| (France) Amine Edge & Dance - Winner; Andy C; Chase & Status; DJ EZ; Friction; Hannah Wants; Pendulum; Shadow Child; Sub Focus; Sigma | (United Kingdom) Carl Cox - Winner; Armin van Buuren; Avicii; Dimitri Vegas & Like Mike; David Guetta; Martin Garrix; Axwell and Ingrosso; Calvin Harris; Sven Vath; Hardwell; Kygo; Nervo; Richie Hawtin; Solomun |
| Best House DJ (revived category) | Best Electronic Live Performance (revived category) |
| (Germany) Claptone - Winner; Darius Syrossian; Detroit Swindle; Doorly; Friction; Hannah Wants; Pendulum; Jackmaster; Kenny "Dope" Gonzalez; Little Louie Vega; Purple Disco Machine; Riva Starr; Todd Terry; Sidney Charles | (Republic of Ireland) Matador - Winner; Bob Moses; Faithless; Gorgon City; Henrik Schwarz; KiNK; LCD Soundsystem; Rudimental; Pantha du Prince |
| Best Breakthrough DJ | Best Electronica DJ |
| (Brazil) Anna - Winner; CamelPhat; Hito; Hunee; Jasper James; Job Jobse; Ryan Elliott; The Avener; The Black Madonna; Tom Trago | (United Kingdom) Jamie xx - Winner; Bonobo; Caribou; David August; Four Tet; Floating Points; John Talabot |
| Special Awards | Special Awards |
| Best Producer: - (Germany) Emanuel Satie - Winner; Best Cutting Edge Product: - (United Kingdom) Funktion-One - Winner; Best Ibiza DJ: - (United Kingdom) – Mr Doris - Winner; Best Ibiza Music Event: - (United States) Mosaic by Maceo Plex, 10 Key Spots in Ibiza- Winner | Best Ibiza Night: - (Spain) Woomoon - Winner; Iconic Club Award: - (Spain) Space - Winner; Best Festival: - (Netherlands) Awakenings - Winner; Electronic Music Pioneer: - (Italy) John Acquaviva - Winner |

=== 2017 ===
The 20th edition winners nominees and recipients were chosen from 13 categories.

| Best Deep House DJ | Best Techno DJ |
|---|---|
| (South Africa) Black Coffee - Winner; Bedouin; Damian Lazarus; Matthias Meyer; Maya Jane Coles; Patrice Baumel; Lee Foss; Lee Burridge | (United Kingdom) Carl Cox - Winner; Adam Beyer; Chris Liebing; Joseph Capriati; Len Faki; Maceo Plex; Nina Kraviz; Nicole Moudaber; Paco Osuna; Sven Vath |
| Best Tech House DJ | Best Big Room House DJ |
| (Chile) (Switzerland) Luciano - Winner; Apollonia; Darius Syrossian; Dubfire; Hot Since 82; Jamie Jones; Kölsch; Nic Fancuilli; Solomun; The Black Madonna; The Martinez Brothers; Tale Of Us | (Netherlands) Hardwell - Winner; Blasterjaxx; David Guetta; Dimitri Vegas & Like Mike; Flume; Galantis; Kygo; Martin Garrix; Major Lazer; Marshmello; Steve Aoki; The Chainsmokers |
| Best Trance DJ | Best Newcomer DJ |
| (Netherlands) Armin van Buuren - Winner; Aly & Fila; Andrew Bayer; Bryan Kearney; Cosmic Gate; John O'Callaghan; Paul van Dyk; Will Atkinson | (United Kingdom) Bontan - Winner; Avalon Emerson; Denis Sulta; Mele; Mollie Collins; My Favorite Robot; Peggy Gou; Palms Trax; Vaal; Satori |
| Best Bass DJ | Best International DJ |
| (United Kingdom) Hannah Wants - Winner; Andy C; Camo & Krooked; Chase & Status; Dimension; Friction; Netsky; Pendulum; Sigma; Sub Focus; Wilkinson; Noisia | (Netherlands) Hardwell - Winner; Armin van Buuren; Carl Cox; David Guetta; Deadmau5; Dixon; Eric Prydz; Fatboy Slim; Martin Garrix; Richie Hawtin; Solomun; Sven Vath |
| Best House DJ | Best Electronic Live Performance |
| (Germany) Claptone - Winner; Dennis Ferrer; DJ Harvey; Doorly; Jackmaster; Friedensengel; Kerri Chandler; Eats Everything; Masters at Work; Roger Sanchez; Seth Troxler; Soul Clap | (Canada) Richie Hawtin - Winner; Bicep; Bonobo; Guti; Henrik Schwarz; KiNK; Matador; Moderat; Nicolas Jaar; Recondite; Rodriguez Jr.; Stephan Bodzin |
| Best Breakthrough DJ | Best Downtempo & Eclectic DJ |
| (United Kingdom) Solardo - Winner; Cristoph; Dax J; Prosix; Dennis Cruz; Layton Giordani; Marco Faraone; Ramiro Lopez; Rampa; Rampue; Reinier Zonneveld; Eagles & Butterflies; Egbert | (Norway) Todd Terje - Winner; Greg Wilson; John Talabot; Maribou State; Mr. Scruff; Mr. Doris; Nightmares on Wax; Quantic |
| Special Awards | Special Awards |
| Best Dance Nation: - Romania - Winner; Eco Award: - (Spain) Oceanic Global - Winner; Electronic Music Pioneer: - (United States) – Marshall Jefferson - Winner; Best Ibiza DJ(2 Winners): - (United Kingdom) Graham Sahara & Paul Reynolds - Winner; Best Ibiza Music Event: - (United Kingdom) Pure Carl Cox - Winner; Best Ibiza Night: - (Spain) Elrow Ibiza - Winner | Best International Festival: - (Croatia) Dimensions Festival - Winner; Best Producer: - (Spain) Dennis Cruz - Winner; Record Label of the Year: - (Sweden) Drumcode Records - Winner; Track Of The Season: - Cola (CamelPhat & Elderbrook) - Winner; 20th Anniversary Award: - (Argentina) DJ Alfredo - Winner |

=== 2018 ===
Past winners included:

| Best Deep House DJ | Best Techno DJ |
|---|---|
| (South Africa) Black Coffee - Winner; &Me; Andhim; Bedouin; Blond:Ish; Damian Lazarus; Maya Jane Coles; Olivier Koletzki; Rampa | (Italy) Joseph Capriati - Winner; Adam Beyer; Chris Liebing; Joseph Capriati; Nina Kraviz; Paco Osuna; Sven Vath; Ricardo Villalobos; Richie Hawtin; Martie Marlz; Sven Väth |
| Best Tech House DJ | House Master |
| (United Kingdom) Patrick Topping - Winner; Art Department; Eats Everything; Green Velvet; Hot Since 82; Jamie Jones; Loco Dice; Nic Fancuilli; Solomun; Seth Troxler; The Martinez Brothers; Steve Lawler | (United States) Roger Sanchez - Winner; David Morales; Dennis Ferrer; DJ Harvey; DJ Snake; Erick Morillo; Kenny Dope; Kerri Chandler; Little Louie Vega; Todd Terry |
| Best Trance DJ | Best Newcomer DJ |
| (Germany) Paul van Dyk - Winner; Aly & Fila; Above & Beyond; Armin Van Buuren; Ferry Corsten; Markus Schulz | (Italy) Alex Kennon - Winner; Bas Ibellini; Brina Knauss; Call Super; East End Dubs; Eli Brown; Brett Finn; Mahony; Mason Maynard; Michael Bibi; Rossko; Salomé; Themba |
| Best Bass DJ | Best International DJ |
| (United Kingdom) Andy C - Winner; Chase & Status; DJ Ez; Goldie; Holy Goof; Netsky; Wilkinson; Noisia | (United Kingdom) Carl Cox - Winner; Armin van Buuren; David Guetta; Bailey McKellar; Deadmau5; Dixon; Martin Garrix; Richie Hawtin; Solomun; Hardwell; Nina Kraviz |
| Best House Artist | Best Electronic Live Performance |
| (United Kingdom) CamelPhat - Winner; Franky Rizardo; Honey Dijon; Jackmaster; Josh Butler; Peggy Gou; Purple Disco Machine; Sam Divine; Skream; The Black Madonna | (Germany) Stephan Bodzin - Winner; Bonobo; Four Tet; Guti; Henrik Schwarz; KiNK; Matador; Moodymann; Paul Kalkbrenner; Sebastian Mullaert |
| Best Progressive House DJ | Best Electronica / Downtempo DJ |
| (Argentina) Hernan Cattaneo - Winner; Behrouz; Cristoph; Guy J; Guy Mantzur; Henry Saiz; John Digweed; Nick Warren; Yotto | (Germany) DJ Koze - Winner; Acid Pauli; Be Svendsen; John Talabot; Jon Hopkins; Monolink; Mr. Scruff; Nico Stojan; Nightmares on Wax; Satori |
| Special Awards | Special Awards |
| Best Dance Nation: - Argentina - Winner; Electronic Music Pioneer: - (United States) – Masters At Work - Winner; Best Ibiza DJ: - (Spain) Clara Da Costa - Winner; Best Ibiza Music Event: - (United Kingdom) Storytellers Chapter 2 - Winner; Best Ibiza Night: - (Spain) Resistance - Winner | Best International Festival: - (Switzerland) Caprices Festival - Winner; Best Producer: - (United Kingdom) Archie Hamilton - Winner; Record Label of the Year: - (Italy) Deeperfect - Winner; Track Of The Season: - Your Mind (Adam Beyer & Bart Skils) - Winner |

=== 2019 ===
The 22nd edition winners nominees and recipients were chosen from 14 categories.

| Best Deep House DJ | Best Techno DJ |
|---|---|
| Maya Jane Coles - Winner; Audiofly; Bedouin; Damian Lazarus; DJ Koze; Guy Gerber; Lee Burrige; Serge Devant | Charlotte De Witte - Winner; Amelie Lens; Anna; Boris Brejcha; Enrico Sangiuliano; Ilario Alicante; Nicole Moudaber; Pan Pot |
| Best Tech House DJ | House Master |
| Michael Bibi - Winner; Camelphat; Detlef; Latmun; Max Chapman; Patrick Topping; Solardo; wAFF | Kerri Chandler - Winner; Armand Van Helden; Amine Edge & DANCE; Chus & Ceballos; Erick Morillo; Honey Dijon; Peggy Gou; Richy Ahmed; Riva Starr; Roger Sanchez |
| Best Trance DJ | Best Newcomer DJ |
| Aly & Fila - Winner; Above & Beyond; Ben Nicky; Bryan Kearney; Cosmic Gate; Ferry Corsten; Gareth Emery; John O’Callaghan | Onyvaa- Winner; Ben Böhmer; Black Loops; James Mc Hale; Justin Cudmore; Miane; Nølah; Peach; Sherelle; Terr |
| Best Bass DJ | Best International DJ |
| Chase & Status - Winner; Andy C; DJ EZ; Friction; My Nu Leng; Shy FX; Sub Focus; Wilkinson | (United Kingdom) Carl Cox - Winner; Adam Beyer; Black Coffee; Claptone; Jamie Jones; Joseph Capriati; Luciano; Nina Kraviz; Paul Van Dyk; Ricardo Villalobos; Richie Hawtin; Seth Troxler; Solomun; Sven Väth |
| Best Afro House Artist | Best Electronic Live Performance |
| (South Africa) Da Capo - Winner; Andhim; Culoe De Song; Floyd Lavine; Hyenah; Osunlade; Super Flu | Stephan Bodzin - Winner; Four Tet; Guti; Jan Blomqvist; Kink; Mathew Jonson; Recondite; Satori |
| Best Progressive House DJ | Melodic House & Techno DJ |
| Hernan Cattaneo - Winner; Dave Seaman; Eelke Kleijn; Guy J; Henry Saiz; Jeremy Olander; Nick Warren; Yotto | Maceo Plex - Winner; Adriatique; Dixon; Kölsch; Mano Le Tough; Mind Against; Patrice Bäumel; Tale Of Us |
| Deep Tech Dj | Breakthrough DJ |
| Butch - Winner; Andrea Oliva; Cuartero; Davide Squillace; Dennis Cruz; Enzo Siragusa; Matthias Tanzmann; Nick Curly; Raresh; tINI | Artbat - Winner; Alex Kennon; Avalon Emerson; Brina Knauss; Carista; Mella Dee; Pirate Copy; Rossko; Themba; William Djoko |
| Special Awards | Special Awards |
| Dance Nation in collaboration with Clubbing TV: Israel - Winner; Cutting Edge: Cercle - Winner; Outstanding contribution supported by Ibiza Spotlight: Simon Dunmore - Winner; Ibiza DJ in collaboration with DJ Mag España: Francisco Allendes - Winner; Ibiza Music Event supported by Pure Ibiza Radio: Cocoon 20 Kraftwerk 3D - Winner; Ibiza Night supported by K-array: Saga - Winner | International Festival in collaboration with Faze Mag: Kappa Futur Festival - Winner; Producer: Enrico Sangiuliano - Winner; Record Label of the year supported by Trax: Hot Creations - Winner; Track of the season: Joys (Roberto Surace) - Winner |

=== 2024 ===
Following a 4 year hiatus, the ceremony returned in 2024. The winners in 19 categories were:

- Best Afro DJ: Black Coffee
- Best House DJ: Sam Divine
- Best Breakthrough: Miss Monique
- International DJ Of The Year: Fisher
- Best Tech House DJ: Vintage Culture
- Best Trance DJ: Armin Van Buuren
- Best Techno DJ: Sven Väth
- Best Drum and Bass DJ: Chase and Status
- Organic House: WhoMadeWho
- Progressive House: CamelPhat
- Best Live Act: Róisín Murphy
- Ibiza Icon: Luciano
- Ibiza Track Of The Summer: Adam Port, Stryv - "Move Feat. Malachiii"
- Global Festival: Defected Croatia
- Eye On… USA: Gospel Club NYC
- Best Ibiza Party: David Guetta - F**K Me Im Famous / Futurerave
- What's Hot Global: Keinemusik
- Lifetime Achievement Award: Javier Anadon
- Play It Back: Michael Bibi

=== 2025 ===
The 2025 awards was held in October at the Roto club in Ibiza. The winners were:

- International DJ: Solomun
- Afro: Kitty Amor
- Balearic: Mina
- Breakthrough: Franky Rizardo
- Drum & Bass: Chase & Status
- Garage/Bassline: Girls Don't Sync
- Hard Dance/Bounce: Hannah Laing
- Hard Techno: Amelie Lens
- House: Kerri Chandler
- Latin House/Reggaeton: Hugel
- Live Act: Rüfüs Du Sol
- Newcomer: Olive F
- Progressive/Melodic House: Miss Monique
- Tech House: Joseph Capriati
- Techno: Marco Faraone
- Trance: KI/KI
- Industry Executive of the Year: Yann Pissenem
- DJ Livestream of the Year: Yousuke Yukimatsu
- Global Festival Award: UNUM Festival, Albania
- Eye On: Soundstorm Festival
- Lifetime Achievement Award: Simon Dunmore
- Play It Back – Social Impact Award: IbizaPreservation
- What’s Hot Global: [UNVRS]
- Ibiza Icon: Alfredo
- Ibiza Party of the Summer: Solid Grooves
- Ibiza Track of the Summer: Toman – Verano En NY

== Records ==
Most Wins

- (United Kingdom) Carl Cox - 16
- (Netherlands) Armin van Buuren - 13
- (United States) Roger Sanchez - 8

Most consecutive wins

- (Netherlands) Armin van Buuren - 8
- (United Kingdom) Carl Cox - 6 (2015–19)
- (United Kingdom) Carl Cox - 4 (2000–02)
- (United Kingdom) Steve Lawler - 3
- (Switzerland) Luciano - 3
- (South Africa) Black Coffee - 3

Most nominations

- (United Kingdom) Carl Cox - 35
- (Netherlands) Armin van Buuren - 20
- (United Kingdom) Richie Hawtin - 18
- (Germany) Paul van Dyk - 15
- (United States) Erick Morillo - 14

Most consecutive nominations

- (United Kingdom) Carl Cox - 32
- (Netherlands) Armin van Buuren - 20
- (United States) Erick Morillo - 14

Most wins in an individual category

- Trance (Netherlands) Armin van Buuren - 9
- Techno - (United Kingdom) Carl Cox - 8
- Tech House - (Switzerland) Luciano - 5
- International - (United Kingdom) Carl Cox - 5
- House - (United States) Roger Sanchez - 4
- Tech House/Progressive - (United Kingdom) Steve Lawler - 4
- Electro House - (Canada) Deadmau5 - 3
- Progressive House - * (United Kingdom) Sasha - 3

Most nominations in an individual category

- Techno - (United Kingdom) Carl Cox - 21
- Trance - (Germany) Paul van Dyk - 15
- House - (United States) Roger Sanchez - 12
- Tech House - (Switzerland) Luciano - 10
- International - (United Kingdom) Carl Cox - 11
