= The BPM Festival =

Annual electronic music festival held in Tamarindo, Costa Rica

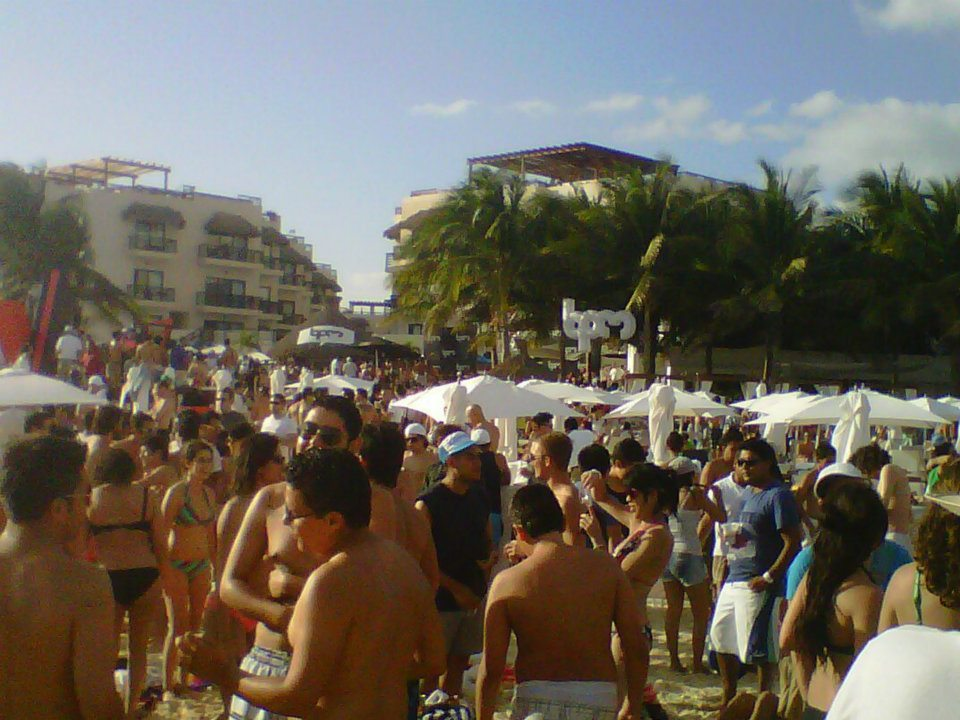
- The BPM Festival
- Genre: Electronic music
- Dates: 24–28 January 2024
- Locations: Tamarindo, Costa Rica
- Years active: 2008–present
- Founders: Craig Pettigrew & Philip Pulitano
- Website: www.thebpmfestival.com

The BPM Festival is an annual electronic music festival, held in Tamarindo, Costa Rica.

== History ==
The BPM Festival is an annual ten day and night electronic music festival, founded by Craig Pettigrew, & Phillip Pulitano, held in Tamarindo, Costa Rica.

BPM, which stands for “Bartenders, Promoters, Musicians” was created in 2008 as a post-New Year's gathering of industry professionals and has grown to a 70,000+ global gathering of DJs, producers, revelers and industry professionals featuring over 400 DJs and 80+ events. BPM parties were originally hosted both day and night at multiple venues in Playa Del Carmen, Mexico a picturesque beach town that runs along miles of soft white sand beaches and sparkling turquoise waters on the Mayan Riviera.

In 2013, The BPM Festival won the "International Festival" award from DJ Awards in Ibiza and in 2016 was nominated by International Dance Music Awards for "Best Music Event" for a third year in a row, as well as “Festival of the Year” at the first ever Electronic Music Awards & Foundation. In addition, The BPM Festival won "Best Festival" in the EMPO Awards in 2015 with a nomination in 2016.

Approximately 35,000 people attended The BPM Festival in 2012. Artists on the 2013 schedule included Richie Hawtin, Sasha, Jamie Jones, Damian Lazarus, Carl Cox, Maceo Plex, Soul Clap, Wolf + Lamb, Lee Burridge, Jamie Roy, Loco Dice and Luciano.

The 10th edition was held in January 2017, with its line-up featuring Carl Cox, Cassy, Dubfire, Erick Morillo, Guy Gerber, John Digweed, Lee Curtiss, Lee Foss, Marco Carola, Nicole Moudaber, Pete Tong, Seth Troxler, Skream, Solomun, Soul Clap, The Martinez Brothers, and Wolf + Lamb.

=== 2017 shooting ===
On 16 January 2017, four people were killed and fifteen were wounded by a "lone shooter" during a closing event for the festival at the Blue Parrot nightclub where Seth Troxler was playing. A woman also died in a stampede that ensued as a result of the gunfire. Organizers identified three of the victims killed as being part of the festival's security staff. An image of a narcomanta claiming responsibility for the attack, left by the drug cartel Los Zetas, circulated following the shootings. The message contained specific references to BPM and Philip Pulitano, stated that they "didn't get in line", and also contained threats against rival gangs. While authorities had not yet connected the shootings to Los Zetas, a person familiar with the matter told CBC News that the attack might have been the result of non-compliance with the gang's demands. Following the shooting, it was reported that the organizers had gone into hiding.

On 16 January 2017, Mayor Cristina Torres Gómez stated in El Universal that the city's stance was to no longer allow BPM's organizers to hold events there. Maria Helena Mata Pineda, president of Riviera Maya's Business Coordinating Council, called for a ban of all electronic music events in the region, stating that "We don't want BPM here anymore, or any other similar event. We don't want it and we thank the authorities who are listening." On 24 January 2017, organizers released their first official statement regarding the shooting, reporting that 14 of the 15 attendees wounded had been released from hospital. The organizers also stated that news reports attributing the shooting to cartel activity were "based on speculation and misinformation from unidentified sources".

=== Relocation to Portugal ===
Organizers canceled future events in Mexico while they considered moving the festival to Brazil or Portugal. Organizers announced in April 2017 that their next festival would be held at Praia da Rocha, Portugal in September that year.

The next festival took place 20–23 September 2018 in Portimão, with artists including: Craig Richards, Joseph Capriati, Octave One, Patrick Topping, and more performing. The 2019 edition took place 12–15 September in Portimão, with Laurent Garnier, Paco Osuna, Loco Dice, and Stefan Bodzin performing.

=== Relocation to Costa Rica ===
In 2020, the festival has relocated to Tamarindo, Costa Rica. It was held there in 2024, and the (January) 2025 festival is at an advanced stage of planning.

The January 2025 festival permits for Tamarindo were not renewed and is now being is being held without permission or permits in Avallenas. It is being protested by locals due to the massive disturbances and strain it brings to the communities.

== See also ==
- List of electronic music festivals
