= Bedouin (DJs) =

American electronic music duo

Bedouin (DJ)
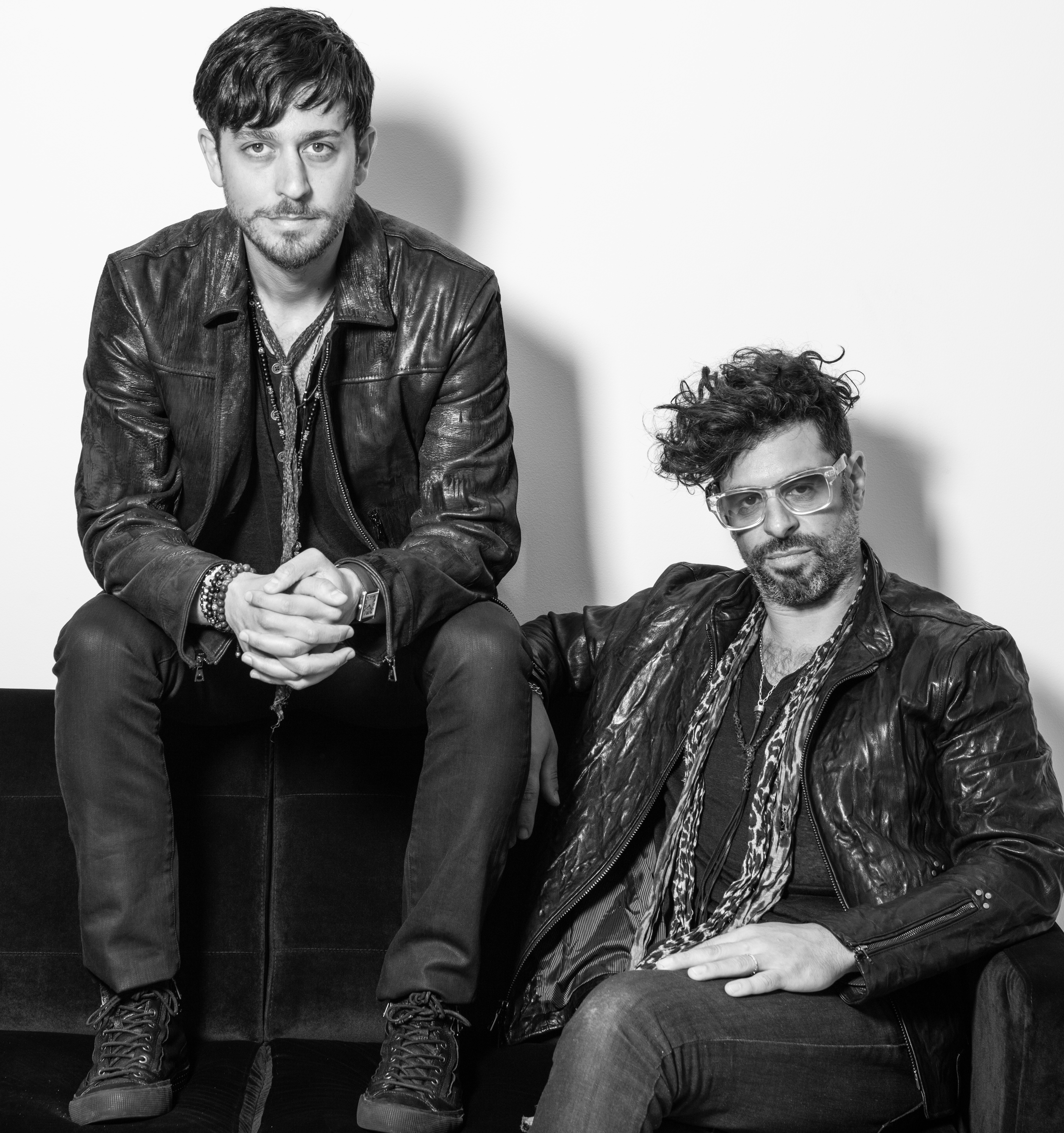
- Tamer Malki (left), Rami Abousabe (right)

Background information
- Born: Jordan (Tamer Malki), New Jersey to Egyptian parents (Rami Abousabe)
- Origin: United States
- Genres: House, deep house, melodic house
- Occupation(s): Musicians, DJs, songwriters, producers
- Years active: 2012–present
- Labels: Crosstown Rebels, Human by Default, All Day I Dream, Circoloco Records, Sony, Ultra
- Members: Tamer Malki; Rami Abousabe
- Website: https://www.bedouin.us/

Bedouin is a music production and DJ partnership based in the United States, consisting of Tamer Malki and Rami Abousabe. As multi-instrumentalists, vocalists, songwriters, and music producers, they blend their Middle Eastern heritage, Western upbringing, and international experiences into a genre-defying sound. The duo has released music on labels such as Crosstown Rebels, All Day I Dream, Circoloco Records, Ultra, Sony and their own imprint, Human by Default. They have also collaborated with artists such as Virgil Abloh, Rony Seikaly, Guy Gerber, Black Coffee and Guy Laliberté.

== Career highlights ==
Bedouin has received recognition for their work, including two appearances on BBC Radio 1's Essential Mix in 2016 and 2020, and being named Mixmag's "Breakthrough Artists" in 2017. The duo were nominated for Best Deep House DJ at the DJ Awards in 2017, 2018 and 2019. They have performed at notable events and venues like Burning Man, Coachella, Tomorrowland, Art Basel, Ushuaïa, and Wynn Las Vegas. In 2017, their cover of Pink Floyd's "Set Control for the Heart of the Sun" was personally endorsed by Pink Floyd drummer Nick Mason. Their Ibiza residency, Bedouin Saga, was awarded "Best Night in Ibiza" by DJ Awards in 2019. In 2022, they recorded a hybrid live set in Petra, Jordan for Cercle, which was awarded as one of the best sets of 2022 by an EDM magazine.

== Discography ==
=== Mixes ===
- 2016: BBC Radio 1 Essential Mix
- 2020: BBC Radio 1 Essential Mix

=== Singles and EPs ===
- 2014: "Mirage", Supernature
- 2015: "Whispering Words of Wisdom, Kindisch
- 2015: "Flight of Birds", All Day I Dream
- 2016: "Ride into the Unknown", Cityfox
- 2017: "Set the Controls for the Heart of the Sun", Crosstown Rebels
- 2017: "Straight to the Heart", All Day I Dream
- 2018: "Wastelands", Crosstown Rebels
- 2020: Whistleman EP, Human by Default
- 2021: "Up in the Flames", Circoloco Records
- 2022: "Petra", Circle Records
- 2022: "The Bedouin Reworks of Dakhabrakha", Human by Default

=== Remixes ===
- 2014: Dance Spirit – "Late Night Early Mornings (Bedouin Remix)", Supernature
- 2015: WhoMadeWho – "Ember (Bedouin Remix)", Get Physical
- 2015: LUM – "Urpillay (Bedouin Remix)", Rebellion
- 2015: El Txef A – "The Love We Lost (Bedouin Remix)", Forbidden Colours
- 2015: Nu – "Geno (Bedouin Remix)", Sprinkler
- 2016: Viken Arman – "Sireli (Bedouin Remix)", Denature Records
- 2017: HOJ/Modd/ Powel – "Telefade (Bedouin Remix)", All Day I Dream
- 2017: Adam Port/ &Me/ Rampa – "One on One (Bedouin Remix)", Keinemusik
- 2018: Damian Lazarus & the Ancient Moons – "Feedback Loop (Bedouin Remix)", Crosstown Rebels
- 2019: Black Coffee feat. Msaki – "I Wish You Were Here (Bedouin Remix)", Ultra
- 2020: LUM – "Pa (Bedouin Remix)", Amores Solitares
- 2020: dOP – "Carousel (Bedouin Remix)", Eleatics Records
- 2021: Virgil Abloah – "Delicate Limbs (Bedouin Remix)", Columbia, Sony
- 2022: Rony Seikaly – "Mila (Bedouin Remix)", Stride
