= Luciano discography =

Luciano discography may refer to:

- The discography of Luciano (DJ)
- The discography of Luciano (singer)
- The discography of Luciano (rapper)
