= Luciano (DJ) =

Chilean-Swiss DJ and producer (born 1978)

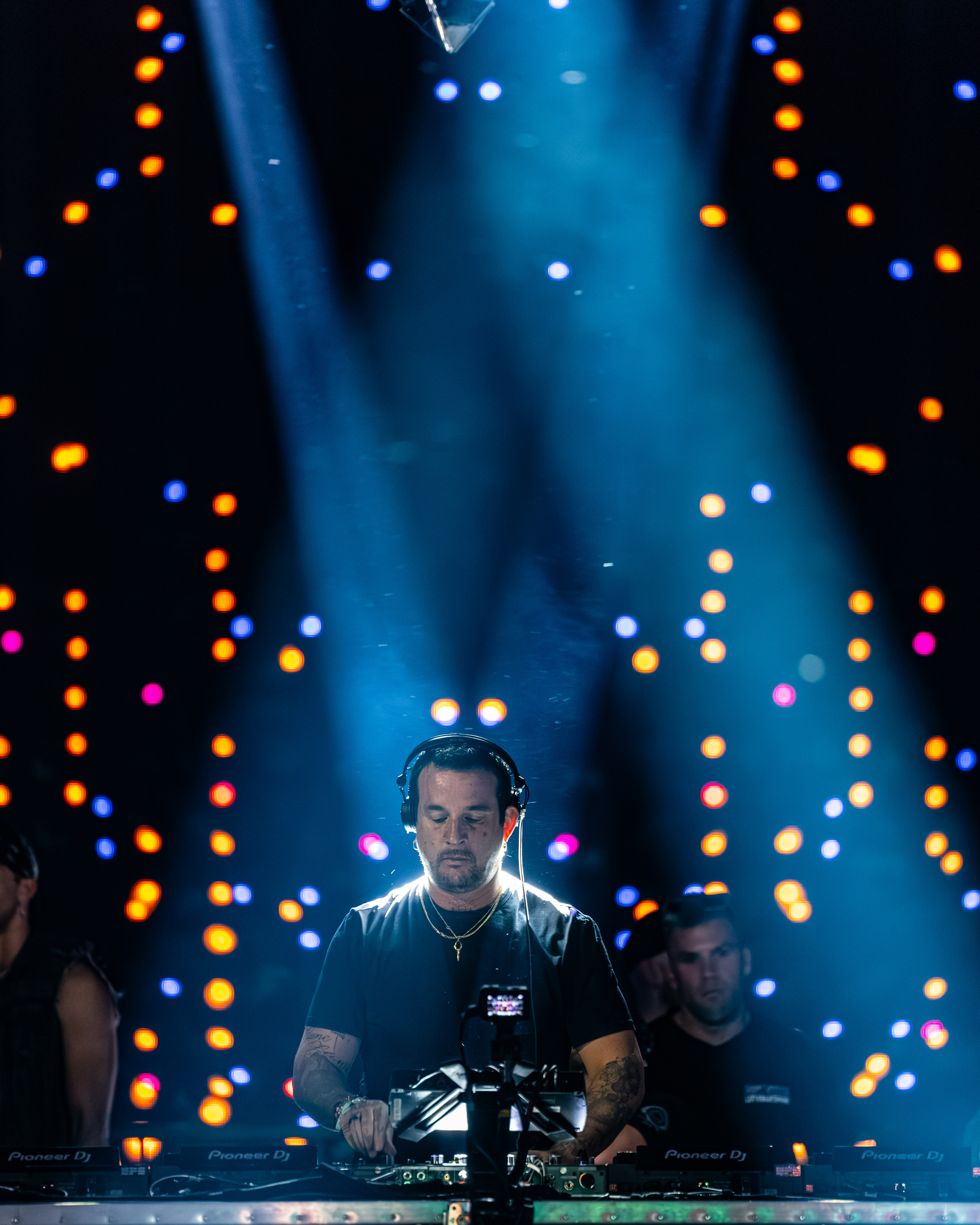
- DJ Luciano playing at EDC Las Vegas 2026

Background information
- Also known as: Lucien Nicolet, Lucien–N–Luciano, Nicol Et Lucien, Robert Crazy, Luciaen
- Born: 24 February 1978 (age 48); Montcherand, Vaud, Switzerland
- Genres: Techno, house, tech house
- Occupations: DJ, music producer
- Labels: Cadenza, Cadenza Lab, Basaec
- Website: lucianocadenza.com

Lucien Nicolet (French pronunciation: [lysjɛ̃ nikɔle]; born 24 February 1978 in Montcherand), known mononymously as Luciano, is a Swiss and Chilean DJ and producer. He has been a twenty-time winner of different awards in the electronic music scene including the Ibiza DJ Awards, Vicious Magazine in Spain, and Swiss NightLife. His DJ sets are strongly influenced by Latin American music. Luciano's initial style of minimal techno has evolved into a blend of house and techno.

== Personal life ==
Luciano was born in Montcherand, Switzerland to a Swiss father and Chilean mother. His father was a jukebox repairman with a large record collection that was played at home. While part of his childhood was spent in Switzerland, musically it would not be as influential as the Chilean and Latin American sounds he would experience upon moving to Santiago de Chile at the age of eleven. His mother along with his sister relocated there after his parents' divorce.

When he was twelve years old, his mother bought him a guitar, which was when Luciano's involvement with music began. He was the guitar player in a punk rock band at school until the age of sixteen. Not long after, he learned that electronic instruments such as sequencers and drum machines were replacing analog ones. After finding a French band called Bérurier Noir that used drum machines in place of a drum set, his passion and interest in electronic music commenced.

Luciano and his wife have 3 sons and a daughter. In 2007, Luciano moved from Berlin to a Swiss village near Geneva to spend more time with them. Luciano enjoys gardening, nature and being surrounded by it.

At the beginning of his career, his handlebar moustache was his signature image. In recent years, he has sported a hot pink streak in his hair.

== Career ==
Influenced by the Detroit fathers of techno such as Juan Atkins and Derrick May, Luciano took his dedication to electronic music to the clubs of Santiago de Chile. His friendship with Dandy Jack and his younger brother Adrian Schopf influenced his decision to DJ. At the time, Luciano DJed at clubs that he was too young to attend, sometimes even being hidden backstage during police raids. Although Luciano began DJing at the age of sixteen, he did not begin producing until the age of nineteen, in 1997. Throughout his youth, Luciano performed construction and other odd jobs in addition to his gigs to support himself.

Starting from the ground up, he became involved in the small and still fledgling minimal techno scene by promoting and playing parties. In a city that was heavily grounded in rock music, Luciano faced many problems carving the path for the electronic music events at local clubs. The owner at the club La Batuta, a popular rock venue where people would put out their cigarettes on the decks, gave Luciano the break he needed. Although his music was at first met with resistance, a year and a half later many of the club's patrons found themselves converted to techno.

In his days of nurturing the electronic music scene in the Chilean club circuit, he would make ties with various prominent figures such as Dandy Jack (Martin Schopf), Adrian Schopf, and most famously, Ricardo Villalobos. Villalobos was a German resident of Chilean descent who would visit Chile often with Dandy Jack. Together they would play at the parties that Luciano threw, one of which was named "Encuentros con la Technocultura." When Villalobos remained in Santiago for six months, the two of them developed their friendship and became close. Together they would work on their musical project, "Sense Club," which Luciano described as "rhythmic electronic music." Luciano would later visit Villalobos in Ibiza for the first time for a month and a half. It is then when his intrigue with the island began, as he found that it not only exceeded all of his expectations, but served as a sanctuary for music as well. When Luciano returned, he continued to promote parties until 1999 when he would ultimately play Santiago's own Love Parade, right before he left for Europe.

In 2000, Luciano moved back to Switzerland to attend studies to become a sound engineer. Opportunities as a musician were running out for Luciano in Chile due to its geography and also in part to his unfinished education. He established a residency at Weetamix club in Geneva and released productions on Oliver Ducret's label Mental Groove Records. A year later, in 2001, Luciano would join the Cocoon team in Ibiza to play at the famous Monday night at Amnesia. He was a core part of the Cocoon Ibiza party until 2006, when he began his residency at DC10, a club in Ibiza known for its after hours and Circoloco party. Despite the fact that Luciano left to pursue his own parties, he still returns to Amnesia to play a few Cocoon parties each season.

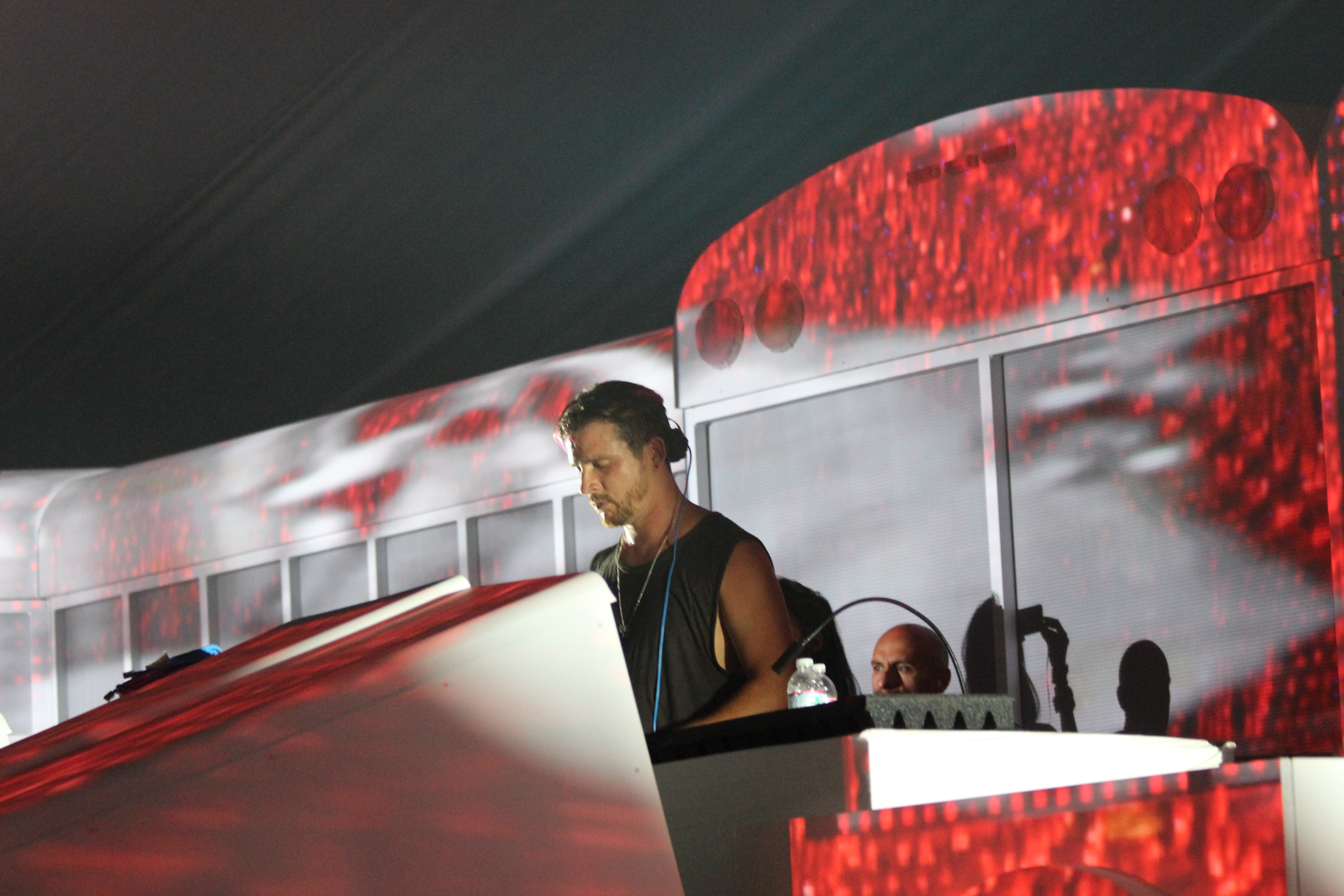
Luciano DJing at Sunday School Electric Zoo Festival NYC 2012

=== Cadenza ===
Luciano often collaborated on music with his friend, Swiss DJ/producer Philippe Quenum. In 2002, they had two tracks, which they wanted to release. His sister Amélie, who was studying to be a graphic designer in Chile, designed the album cover for the tracks. Along with the cover, she designed the logo for a label to release them, "Cadenza," which signifies cadence in Spanish. At the beginning Cadenza was supposed to be a short endeavor, a platform for releasing only a few tracks. Because of the huge success of the first EP with the track "Orange Mistake," Luciano decided to carry on running the label.

=== Æther Live ===
The Narod Niki project - which involved few DJs such as Dandy Jack, Richie Hawtin, Ricardo Villalobos, Carl Craig, Zip, Maurizio, Basic Channel, and Luciano himself - was a live laptop jam session. Narod Niki played infrequently over the years 2003, 2004, 2006, and 2007 and its performances usually had an assigned theme to them. In 2009, after taking four years to complete, Luciano decided to escalate a multi-sensory experience of his own called Æther Live. The project involved label mates - Reboot, Mirko Loco, Lee Van Dowski, and Digitaline - who each would play sounds using Ableton Live. Luciano would stand likewise to a conductor with his back to the audience, selecting which sounds would be ultimately heard by the audience. The musical symphony of five DJs and a percussionist was coupled with a visual aspect, where each sound had a denominated color synchronized. Luciano as well as Todd Graft and Loki of Micro Chunk controlled the visuals throughout the performance. Æther Live had eleven tour dates, with stops in Europe, Asia, and North America.

=== Ibiza ===
Luciano had always been partial to day parties and the vibe they entail, so in the 2009 summer season when DC10 went on a hiatus, throwing a free daytime party from 4pm to midnight on Wednesdays at a beach club owned by Yann Pissenem was the obvious move. Before Ushuaïa the hotel and club was built, Luciano had already known and worked with Yann, the owner, for quite some time. It was at first skeptical whether Ushuaia would succeed due to the Ibiza's regulations on daytime music parties. However, Ushuaïa proved a serious competitor for the clubs on the island, and Luciano would continue to hold his party "Luciano & Friends" on Thursdays. The free beach party turned into a successful venture featuring a new hotel and a pool party that sold 4–5,000 tickets each week with Luciano's help. In the summer season of 2013, the party was moved to Tuesdays.

The party concept of "Vagabundos," which signifies vagabonds in Spanish, was created in 2010 by Luciano to showcase the artists on Cadenza's booking roster at Ibiza's famous club, Pacha. Samuel Guetta, former manager of Luciano and Cadenza, was the one who came up with the concept and appropriated it for Pacha. Its aesthetic was based on a traveling band of gypsies and performers, which was clearly communicated in their advertisement campaigns and party decor. The idea originated after a tour in Brazil, where the Brazilians would call Luciano and his label mates "vagabundos sin futuros" or "vagabonds without futures" due to their lifestyle of partying late and constantly traveling. Luciano felt the name and notion was appropriate for bohemian air of his party. The following year, the company returned as Vagabundos 2.0, with a slightly different look. The party was successfully hosted at Pacha for three years and toured around the world. In 2013, the party was moved from Pacha to Booom! Ibiza for unknown reasons. Since the year of its inception, a compilation CD has been released each year after the season. Luciano mixed the first two; Argy and Andrea Olivia mixed 2013's Vagabundos CD.

=== Recent years ===
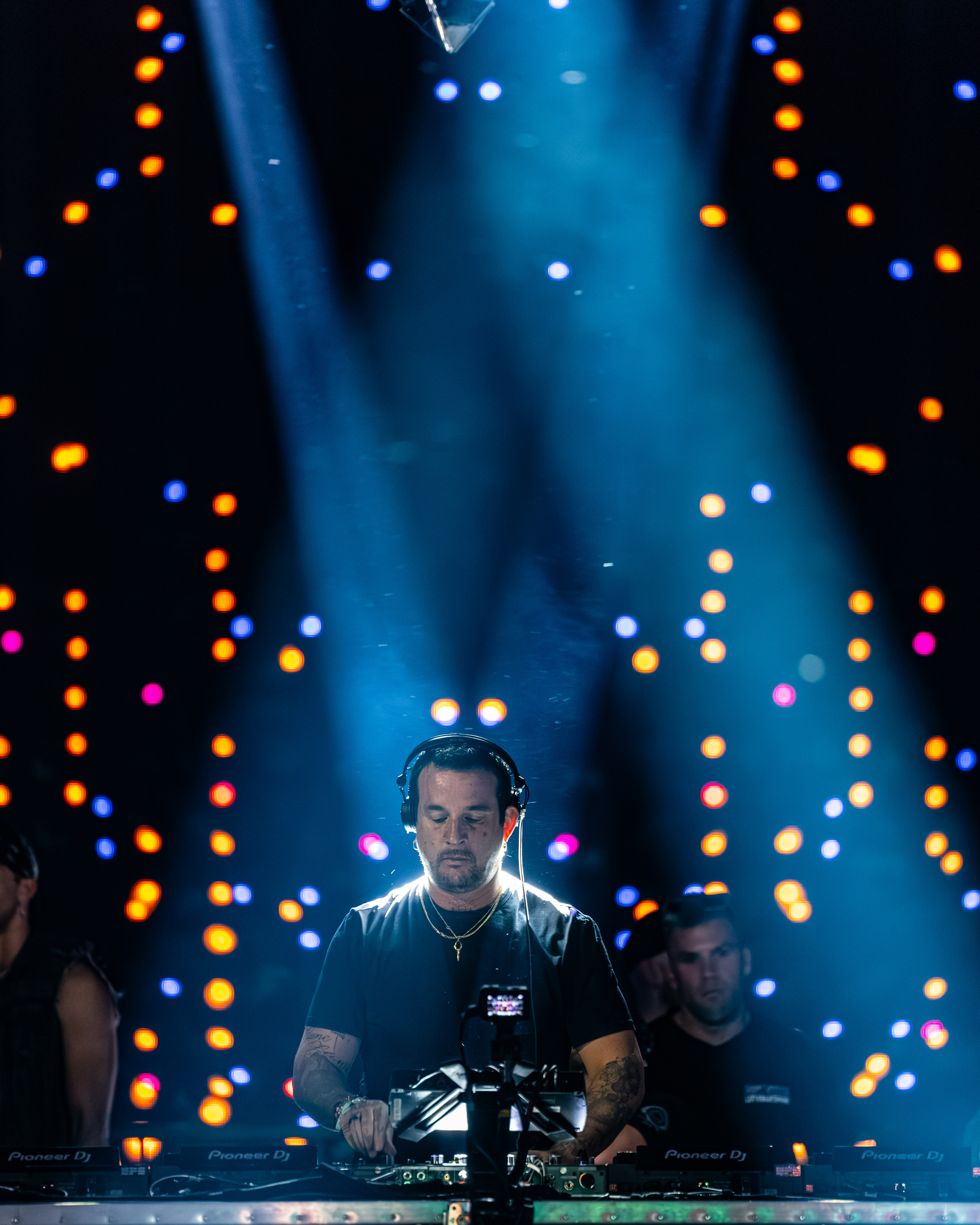
DJ Luciano playing at EDC Las Vegas 2026

In February 2013, Luciano joined Richie Hawtin and Skrillex participating in the program "Bridges for Music" in South Africa. Valentino Barrioseta, who is a long time friend of Luciano's, runs the non-profit organization that helps reach out to underprivileged communities via music. Luciano participated in the workshop put together in Soweto, as a chance to show that music can be accessible even in remote areas. In May, Luciano, alongside his wife and sister, created the charity "One Coin For Life." His family's visit to the Arhuaco tribe in Colombia, South America in April 2012, inspired the desire to do good. "One Coin For Life" supports smaller charities that help struggling communities receive the proper health and nutrition programs they need. It is empowered by the voice, awareness, and donations from the electronic music community.

Later that year, in October, Luciano moved his family and label from Switzerland to Barcelona, Spain. The move accomplished bringing work and family closer to Ibiza and allowed for the launch of his artist management company called Aether Artists. The agency is affiliated with Cadenza and boasts eighteen new and established artists, including Luciano himself.

== Production ==
Luciano has had various projects and aliases throughout his production career. Besides working with Villalobos on Sense Club, Luciano also worked with Argenix Brito and Pier Bucci under the moniker "Monne Automne." The Lucien-n-Luciano alias is the softer side of his works, under which his first full-length album "Blind Behaviour" was released on Peacefrog Recordst in 2004. Martin Schopf (Dandy Jack) had always been a major influence on Luciano, and the two spent many weekends playing and making music together, resulting in the project Carabina 30/30. Under his main alias, Luciano has released on labels Perlon and Mental Groove Records. His last album, "Tribute to the Sun," was released on Cadenza in 2009.

Although Luciano was not in the habit and not a fan of creating mix CD compilations, he was approached by SOMA Quality Recordings to mix Sci.Fi.Hi.Fi Volume Two. While at first he resisted the proposition, he finally conceded. In 2012, Luciano tried his hand at something new by collaborating with pop rock artist Lenny Kravitz. The two performed together at the Ibiza 123 Rocktronic festival.

== Discography ==
=== Albums ===
- 2004: Blind Behaviour (Peacefrog Records)
- 2007: No Model No Tool (Cadenza)
- 2009: Tribute To The Sun (Cadenza)

=== Singles & EPs ===
- 2000: Lucie, Tom et Clementine (Mental Groove Records)
- 2001: 1/2 (Mental Groove Records)
- 2001: 2/2 (Mental Groove Records)
- 2002: Amelie on Ice (Mental Groove Records)
- 2002: Capricciosa (Bruchstuecke)
- 2002: Future Senses (Klang Elektronik)
- 2002: Cadenza (Single), Where Is Here - A Mental Groove Compilation (Mental Groove Records)
- 2003: Alpine Rocket - with Mathew Jonson (Perlon)
- 2003: Orange Mistake/Funky Daddy - with Quenum (Cadenza 1)
- 2003: La Limonada de Pepe Bombilla (Mental Groove Records)
- 2003: Membrillo - Cabo San Roque vs. Luciano (Bruchstuecke)
- 2004: Funk Excursion - Luciano & Serafin (Cadenza 4)
- 2005: Bomberos/Octogonal (Cadenza 6)
- 2006: In the Spirit - with Thomas Melchor (Cadenza 11)
- 2006: Yamoré Remix (Cadenza 9)
- 2006: Stone Age - Pier Bucci Luciano, Lucien (Cadenza 2)
- 2006: Clara Ghavani Extended - with NSI (Cadenza 5.5)
- 2006: Silverbird Casino - with EAT (Diamonds & Pearls)
- 2007: Etudes Electronique (Cadenza 21)
- 2007: Fourges Et Sabres (Perlon)
- 2008: Family - with Mirko Loco (Desolat)
- 2009: Versus - with Guy Gerber / Lee Van Dowski & Glimpse (Cadenza 36)
- 2010: 10diez10 (Cadenza Lab)
- 2010: Introducing Light & Sounds (under Monne Automne) (Lofi Stereo)
- 2012: Rise of Angel (Cadenza 82)
- 2013: Cachai/Dance Unity (Cadenza 84)
- 2014: Into The Aether Part One (Cadenza 93)
- 2015: Luciano, Francesco Tristano - Amnesie (Original Mix) (Get Physical Music)
- 2015: Luciano feat. Jaw - 7direction(s) (Cadenza 105)

=== Remixes ===
- 2003: Chica & The Folder - A Certain Track Schatulle EP (Monika Enterprise)
- 2004: Tim Wright - Thirst (Luciano's Dancehall Remix), The Ride EP (novamute)
- 2005: Memo - Silverspoons (Luciano Silverspooner Remix), KITCHENTOOLS EP (Lan Muzic)
- 2005: Argy - Love Dose (Luciano Remix), Love Dose (Pokerflat Recordings)
- 2006: Robag Wruhme - Wortkabular (Luciano Remix), Wortkabular (Remixes) (Musik Krause)
- 2008: Dave Aju - Crazy Place (Luciano Remix), Crazy Place (Circus Company)
- 2009: Kevin Saunderson - Good Love (Luciano's Good Love Remix), History Elevate Remixed (KMS Records)
- 2009: Minilogue - Animals (Luciano Remix), Animals (Cocoon Recordings)
- 2009: Loco Dice- Pimp Jackson Is Talkin' Now!!! (Luci Gets Loco Remix), 7 Dunham Place Remixed Part 1 (Desolat)
- 2010: Reboot - Uruana (Luciano Remix), Rambon EP (Cadenza 50)
- 2011: Ernesto Ferreryra - Los Domingos Vuelo A La Casa (Luciano Remix), El Paraiso De Las Tortugas Remixes (Cadenza 58)
- 2011: Recloose & Dwele - Can't Take It (Luciano Remix), Can't Take It (Remixes) (Planet E)
- 2011: Subflow - You Come And Go (Luciano Remix), You Come And Go (Technical Enemy)
- 2012: Mirko Loko - Gipsy-Q (Luciano Remix), Gipsy-Q (Memento, a record label founded by Idriss D)
- 2013: Rebelski - The Rift Valley (Luciano Remix) (Cadenza 88)
- 2014: Lopazz - Migracion (Luciano's Camaleon Remix) (Get Physical Music)
- 2014: Ludwig van Beethoven - Für Elise (DJ Luciano Club Remix) (LoudDjs)
- 2015: Popof - Words Gone (Luciano Remix) (Hot Creations)
- 2015: Jerome Sydenham & Rune RK - Can't Stop Not (Luciano Remix) (Ibadan Records)
- 2015: Basement Jaxx - Love Is At Your Side (Luciano Remix - Edit) (Atlantic Jaxx)
- 2015: Popof Feat. Arno Joey - Words Gone (Luciano Remix) (Hot Creations)

=== Mix Compilations ===
- 2002: Live @ Weetamix (Max Ernst)
- 2003: Party News - Electro-House (DJ Beat Records)
- 2006: Sci.Fi.Hi.Fi. Volume 2 (SOMA Quality Recordings)
- 2007: Cadenza Contemporary 01 & Cadenza Classics (Cadenza)
- 2008: Fabric 41 (Fabric (London))
- 2012: Vagabundos 2012 (Cadenza)
- 2012: Vagabundos (Cadenza Lab)

== DJ Awards ==
Luciano has won the Best Tech House DJ Award 5 times and received a total of 10 nominations at the DJ Awards.

Year	Nominee / work	Award	Result
2008	Luciano	Best Breakthrough DJ	Nominated
2008	Luciano	Best Tech House/Progressive DJ	Nominated
2010	Luciano	Best Tech House DJ	Won
2011	Luciano	Best International DJ	Nominated
2011	Luciano	Best Tech House DJ	Won
2012	Luciano	Best Tech House DJ	Nominated
2013	Luciano	Best International DJ	Nominated
2013	Luciano	Best Tech House DJ	Won
2014	Luciano	Best Tech House DJ	Won
2015	Luciano	Best Tech House DJ	Won
