= Milton Jackson =

Scottish musician and music producer

Milton Jackson (real name Barry Christie) is a Scottish DJ, record producer, and DJ Awards winner from Glasgow, specializing in deep house.

== Discography ==
=== Studio albums ===
- 2002 The Bionic Boy
- 2009 Crash

=== Studio singles / EPs ===
- 2001 The Rhythm EP
- 2001 "Sunlight" (12")
- 2003 Jaded EP (12")
- 2006 "Future Fresh" (12")
- 2006 I Want It EP (12")
- 2006 "Special Powers" (12")
- 2006 "Tech No" (12")
- 2006 The Evil Theme EP (12")
- 2006 "Rogue Element" (12")
- 2007 "Cycles" (12")
- 2008 "Ghosts in My Machines" (12")
- 2009 "Crash / Rhythm Track" (12")
- 2010 "Breathe" (12")
- 2012 "Lessons Learned EP" (12")
- 2012 "Sub Rosa" (12" Ltd)
- 2015 "Your Love" (12")
