= Üner =

Üner is a Turkish name. Notable people with the name include:

Given name:

- Üner Kirdar (born 1933), Turkish author and United Nations official
- Üner Tan (1937-2022), Turkish neuroscientist and evolutionary biologist
- Üner Teoman (1932-2024), Turkish Olympic sprinter

Surname:

- İdil Üner (born 1971), German-Turkish actress
- Kaan Üner (born 1988), Turkish basketball player

== See also ==
- Uner Tan syndrome, syndrome proposed by the Turkish evolutionary biologist Üner Tan
- National University of Entre Ríos or UNER, public research university in Entre Ríos Province, Argentina
