= Steve Lawler (DJ) =

British house music producer and DJ (born 1973)

- Born: 29 May 1973 (age 53); Birmingham, England
- Genres: House; tribal house; tech house; techno
- Occupations: Disc jockey, record producer, A&R
- Labels: Harlem Records, Viva Music
- Website: djstevelawler.com

Steve Lawler (born 1973) is a British house music producer and DJ born in Birmingham, England. He is a five time DJ Awards winner and has held residences at many popular dance clubs such as Space, The End and Twilo. Because of his successful performances at Space in Ibiza, he was nicknamed "King of Space". Lawler has released several mix albums and is especially well known for his Lights Out series featured on Boxed. He currently runs the record label VIVa Music. He also founded the now defunct Harlem Records leaving a list of creditors in its wake.

== Biography ==
Steve Lawler originally gained interest in the music scene around the age of 16, listening to pirate radio stations. Beginning at age 17, Lawler staged a series of illegal parties in a tunnel under the M42 motorway from 1990 to 1994. After several parties, the event began to regularly attract over 500 people and eventually earned Lawler appearances at proper clubs.

Lawler's first break came in 1995, when DJ Jason Bye asked him to play daily at Ibiza's reputed Café Mambo of San Antonio "Sunset strip" fame. In 1997 Steve's big break came when he met Darren Hughes of the nightclub Cream, who signed him to a residency at Cream. In 2000, Steve started his first mix compilation series, titled 'Dark Drums'. This same year Steve started his new residency for Darren Hughes, at the infamous Club Home, where Steve Lawler held his own Friday nights Deep South which he ran until the club shut down 1 year later. He also released the single "Rise In" on Bedrock Records, which featured vocals from the Reef song Mellow (and previously remixed by Prince Quick) and reached No. 50 on the UK Singles Chart and No. 15 on Billboard's Hot Dance Music/Club Play. This same year, he was asked by Boxed to mix the third entry in their Nubreed series, Nubreed 003. After his Nubreed release, Lawler approached Boxed with the idea for the Lights Out series. In 2001 Lawler started a night in his hometown Birmingham called the Midweek Session, this was run for 12 parties only, running monthly on a Thursday night. Lawler returned to London in 2002 with the beginning of his "Harlem Nights" event at The End, which was one of The End's most successful nights and ran continuously for 7 years. . Lawler founded the record label VIVa MUSiC in 2006.

In 2013, he held a Viva Warriors event at Fire in Vauxhall, London and drew a large crowd for one of only two UK winter shows from Steve Lawler's Ibiza residency crew.

In 2016, he held a residency at Sankeys in Ibiza under the Viva Warriors brand.

== Personal life ==
Lawler's wife Daniela appeared as a contestant on Come Dine with Me between 22 and 26 November 2010.

== Musical genres ==
Lawler describes his style of house music to be "deep" and "sexy". Others have echoed his sentiments, comparing Lawler's music to disco in terms of attitude. Though he's often named a Tech DJ, Lawler says that he prefers not to fall under any particular genre. Lawler's music is House and Techno. Of the music Lawler plays, he is known to perform his own edited versions.

== Influences ==
Rather than any particular genre or musical groups, Lawler says that his brand of dark house is influenced more by "vices" and dark experiences. He does, however, claim his biggest inspirations as Depeche Mode and The Doors, citing their dark lyrics and atmosphere. Lawler says that the DJ that was most influential on him was Danny Tenaglia, admiring his passion and dedication to DJing and clubbers.

== Selected discography ==
Lights Out
Review scores
Source	Rating
URB	3.5/5 stars

Albums

- 2000: Dark Drums (Tide)
- 2000: Nubreed 003 (Boxed)
- 2001: Dark Drums 2 (Tide)
- 2002: Lights Out (Boxed)
- 2003: Lights Out 2 (Boxed)
- 2005: Lights Out 3 (Global Underground Ltd.)
- 2006: Viva (Ministry of Sound)
- 2007: VIVa London (Renaissance Records, Ultra Records)
- 2008: VIVa Toronto (Renaissance Records, Ultra Records)
- 2011: "Lights Out Decade" (VIVa MUSiC)
- 2012: "VIVa Warriors" – Mixed by Steve Lawler & Darius Syrossian (VIVa MUSiC)

Singles

- 1999: Novacane – "Rainmaker" (Glow Recordings)
- 2000: "Rise In" (Bedrock) (UK Singles Chart No. 50, Billboard Hot Dance Music/Club Play #15/Hot Dance Music/Maxi-Singles Sales #41)
- 2002: "Andante" (Bedrock)
- 2004: "Out at Night" (Subversive)
- 2005: "That Sound" (Beside Music, Joia Records)
- 2006: S.L.A.D.L.Y. – "Unicorn" (VIVa MUSiC)
- 2007: "Courses For Horses" (Renaissance Recordings)
- 2007: "Violet" (Viva Music)
- 2007: "Sleep Walking (Tsuba)
- 2008: "21st Century Ketchup" (Sci-Tec)
- 2008: "Femme Fatale" (Ovum)
- 2009: "Kalimba" (R&S Records)
- 2009: "Carnival" (Tanzbar)
- 2009: "Distrait" (Systematic)
- 2009: "Hocus Pocus" (VIVa MUSiC)
- 2010: "Almerina" (Harthouse)
- 2010: "Gimme Some More" (VIVa MUSiC)
- 2013: "Avaida (The Organ Track)" (VIVa MUSiC)

== Awards and accolades ==
=== DJ Awards ===
The DJ Awards organizes the annual electronic music DJ awards event it is the only international ceremony for DJs and also the oldest, the awards are held once a year at Pacha club in Ibiza Spain it is one of the most important accolades an artist can win or be honoured by.

Lawler has won 5 awards and received 11 nominations overall.

Year	Nominee / work	Award	Result
2000	Steve Lawler	Leader of the New Breed	Won
2003	Steve Lawler	Best Tech House/Progressive DJ	Won
2004	Steve Lawler	Best Tech House/Progressive DJ	Won
2005	Steve Lawler	Best Tech House/Progressive DJ	Won
2006	Steve Lawler	Best Tech House/Progressive DJ	Nominated
2007	Steve Lawler	Best Tech House/Progressive DJ	Nominated
2008	Steve Lawler	Best Tech House/Progressive DJ	Won
2009	Steve Lawler	Best Tech House DJ	Nominated
2010	Steve Lawler	Best Tech House DJ	Nominated
2011	Steve Lawler	Best Tech House DJ	Nominated
2015	Steve Lawler	Best Tech House DJ	Nominated

=== DJ Magazine Rankings ===
- 1999 - No. 99
- 2000 - No. 11
- 2001 - No. 9
- 2002 - No. 13
- 2003 - No. 14
- 2004 - No. 21
- 2005 - No. 30
- 2006 - No. 38
- 2007 - No. 42
- 2008 - No. 91
- 2009 - No. 80
- 2018 - N0. 10 on Alternative Top 100 DJs
