= Kaan Üner =

Turkish basketball player (born 1988)

Kaan Üner (born 3 March 1988) is a Turkish professional basketball player. He plays for Torku Selçuk Üniversitesi.
