= Maceo Plex =

American DJ (born 1978)

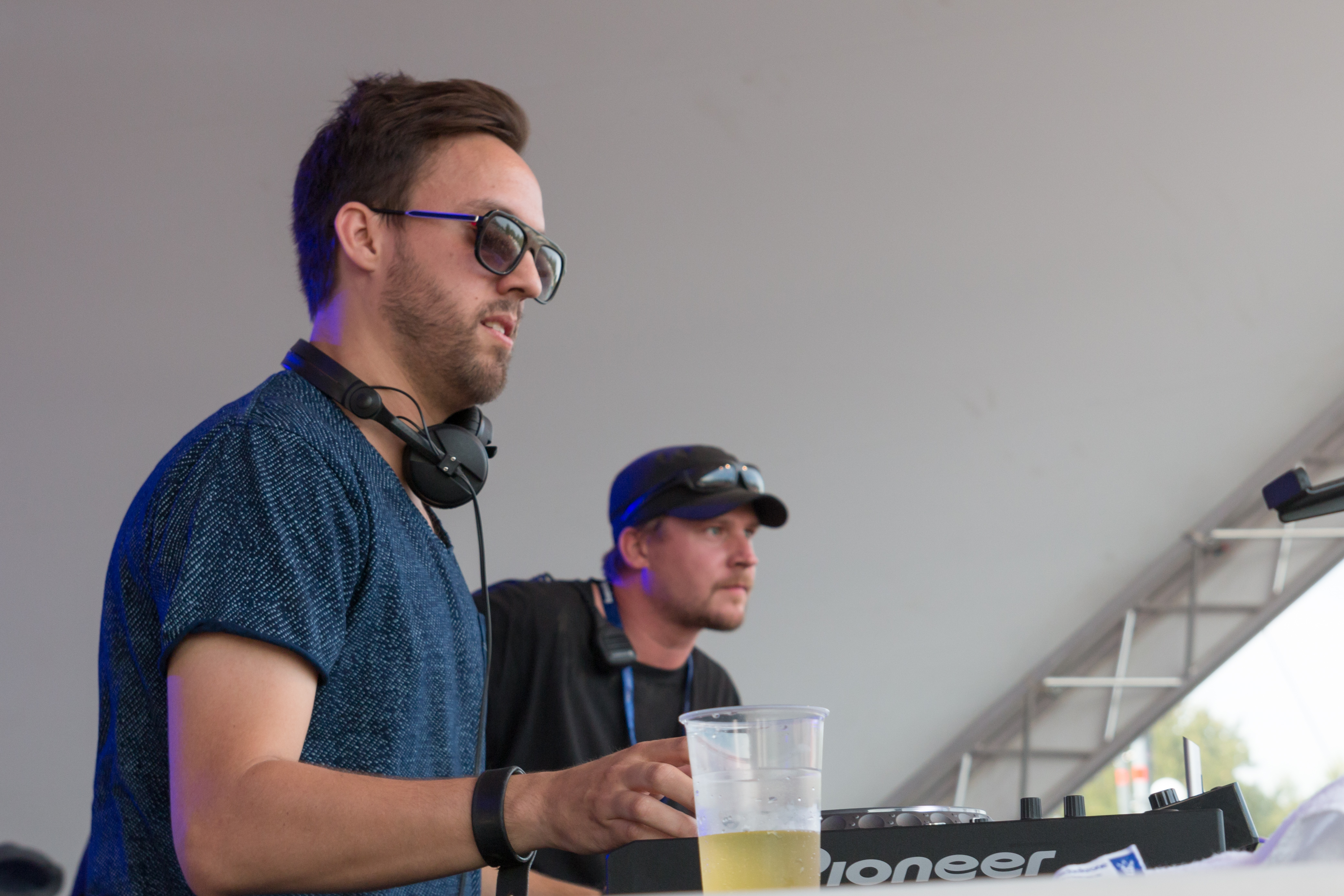
- Maceo Plex in 2015

Background information
- Also known as: Maceo Plex, Maetrik, Mariel Ito
- Born: Eric Estornel; November 6, 1978 (age 47); Flower Mound, Texas, U.S.
- Genres: Deep house, tech house, house, techno, progressive house
- Occupations: DJ, music producer
- Years active: 1993–present
- Labels: ILUNA Records, Crosstown Rebels, Lone Romantic, Ellum Audio, Ellum Black Drumcode Records
- Website: maceoplex.komi.io

Eric Estornel (born November 6, 1978), better known by his stage names Maceo Plex (/ˈmeɪsioʊ/), Maetrik and Mariel Ito, is an American DJ, techno music producer and DJ Awards winner, raised in Dallas and Miami.

== Biography ==
He is best known for his diverse production style, which is influenced primarily by house and by techno but also elements of electro and tech house; He is a longtime performer in many of Ibiza's top clubs, including the now-closed Space and Amnesia, and since 2016 has hosted his own club night, Mosaic by Maceo, throughout the summer in Pacha.

In July 2017, Estornel released a new concept project titled Solar, named after his baby son. It is his third studio album, through which he wanted to create deeper, more meaningful connection with his audience. The project combined ambient electronica, breakbeats and melodies, with dub and techno flourishes and guest vocalists. Solar has been released on Lone Romantic, Estornel's new, electronica-based label.

The Return two-track EP under Clash Lion Records was released in September 2017, Estornel's first release as Maetrik since 2012's Unleash The Beast EP. In spring 2018 Estornel created CD - fabric98, his fabric mix debut which bears the name of his big-room, Ibiza-friendly alias, but it reflects the music he's made under various guises including Maetrik and Mariel Ito over the last 20 years. fabric98 mix is an artist paying homage to the respected CD series all the while staying true to his love of blending many genres into one journey filled mix. His most recent production is the album Mutant Series released in March 2019 on Ellum Audio. In 2021, he remixed Faithless' 1995 song Insomnia.

He currently resides in Barcelona, Spain with his wife and children.

== Discography ==
=== Studio albums ===
- Life Index (Crosstown Rebels, 2011)
- Journey to Solar (Ellum Audio, 2016)
- Solar (Lone Romantic, 2017)
- Mutant Series (Ellum Audio, 2019)
- '93 (Lone Romantic, 2023)

=== Singles and extended plays ===
- Maetrik / Maceo Plex - Clubs EP (Resopal Schallware, 2009)
- Vibe Your Love (Crosstown Rebels, 2010)
- Under the Sheets EP (No.19 Music, 2011)
- High & Sexy EP (Ellum Audio, 2011)
- Your Style (Crosstown Rebels, 2011)
- Sweating Tears EP (Crosstown Rebels, 2011)
- Can't Leave You (Crosstown Rebels, 2011)
- Maceo Plex & Elon - Bummalo EP (ReSolute Label, 2011)
- Odd Parents & Maceo Plex - Get Enough (Leftroom, 2012)
- Frisky (Crosstown Rebels, 2012)
- Jon Dasilva & Maceo Plex - Love Somebody Else (Ellum Audio, 2012)
- Space Junk (Ellum Audio, 2012)
- Jupiter Jazz (Maceo Plex & Danny Daze) - Booty Jazz (Ellum Audio, 2013)
- In Excess (Ellum Edits, 2013, uncredited)
- Maceo Plex & Maars featuring Florence Bird - Going Back (Ellum Audio, 2013)
- Conjure One (Ellum Audio, 2014)
- Conjure Two (Minus, 2014)
- Conjure Superstar (Kompakt, 2014)
- Conjure Infinity (Drumcode, 2014)
- Maceo Plex & Gabriel Ananda - Solitary Daze (Ellum Audio, 2014)
- Solar Sampler (Ellum Audio, 2015)
- Maceo Plex featuring C.A.R - Mirror Me (Kompakt, 2015)
- Journey to Solar (Ellum Audio, 2016)
- The Tesseract (Ellum Audio, 2017)
- Mutant 1 - Maceo Plex & Maars (Correspondant Music, 2018)
- Mutant 2 (Ellum Black, 2018)
- Mutant Robotics (Ellum Audio, 2018)
- Mutant Romance (MPLX, 2018)
- When the Lights Are Out (Ellum Audio, 2019)
- Nu World (Ellum Audio, 2020)
- Maceo Plex & Program 2 - Revision feat. Giovanni (Ellum Audio, 2021)
- Maceo Plex & Oscar And The Wolf - All Night (Higher Ground, 2022)
- Maceo Plex & Ishi - Moon Sky (Lone Romantic, 2023)

=== Other tracks ===
Year	Track	Date	Release
2011	"Alpha"	Mar 24, 2011	Hot Waves, Vol. 1
2011	"Falling"	Jul 18, 2011	Visionquest Beach Collection - Spring Summer 2011
2011	"God Is Still My Papa"	Jan 11, 2011	Crosstown Promo Mix, unreleased
2011	"Her Security"	May 9, 2011	5 Years of Galaktika
2012	"Deez Nutz"	Mar 12, 2012	Ellum Sleazy Riders Collection
2012	"Mediate 2012" (vs. INXS)	Jul 5, 2012	Released on Soundcloud
2012	"Why"	Nov 6, 2012	Watergate X
2013	"Calm Under Pressure" (with Cajmere)	May 13, 2013	Too Underground For The Main Stage
2013	"Galactic Cinema"	Apr 19, 2013	DJ-Kicks: Maceo Plex
2013	"Mind On Fire"	Apr 19, 2013	DJ-Kicks: Maceo Plex
2013	"Thank You Larry"	Nov 15, 2013	Mixmag Presents Deep Ellum
2013	"When It All Comes to This" (with Mark O'Sullivan)	Apr 19, 2013	DJ-Kicks: Maceo Plex
2018	"Mutant Magic"	Apr 20, 2018	Fabric 98
2019	Maetrik "Time Warp 25 Years Tool"	April, 2019	Released on Soundcloud

=== Remixes ===
Year	Artist	Track	Title
2010	Glimpse	"Walk Tall"	Maceo Plex Remix
2011	Azari & III	"Manic"	Maceo Plex Remix
2011	Bazar	"Hard to Find"	Maceo Plex Funk Drop
2011	DJ T. featuring Cari Golden	"City Life"	Maceo Plex Remix
2011	Jin Choi	"Half Baked"	Maceo Plex Deep Remix; Maceo Plex Groove Remix
2011	Laura Jones	"Love In Me"	Maceo Plex Remix
2011	Maceo Plex	"Your Style"	Maceo Plex Re-Visit
2011	Martin Dawson featuring NRG	"Think About It"	Maceo Plex Remix
2012	Jon Dasilva featuring Joi Cardwell	"Love Somebody"	Maceo Plex Bonus Tool
2012	Maetrik	"Walk Alone"	Maceo Plex Revenge Mix
2013	Ali Love featuring Kali	"Emperor"	Maceo Plex Last Disco Remix
2013	Aphex Twin	"Polynomial-C"	Maceo Plex Edit
2013	Azari & III	"Manic"	Maceo Plex Lost Version
2013	Butch featuring Benjamin Franklin	"Highbeams"	Maceo Plex Remix
2013	Eric Volta	"Rez-Shifter"	Maceo Plex Remix
2013	Footprintz	"Uncertain Change"	Maceo Plex Reconception Remix
2013	Good Guy Mikesh	"Place of Love"	MP Edit
2013	Jaydee	"Payback"	Maceo Plex Remix
2013	Lab Insect aka Nomenklatür	"Oh Happy Day"	Maceo Plex Edit
2013	Mathias Schaffhäuser	"Nice to Meet You"	Maceo Plex Remix
2013	Mattski	"Escapism"	Maceo Plex Conversation Remix
2013	Murr featuring Rosina	"Dive into the Deepest"	MP Remix
2013	S.A.M.	"Nangijala"	Maceo Plex Reggae Edit
2013	Sound Stream	"Love Jam"	Maceo Plex Unofficial Remix
2013	Visnadi	"Racing Tracks"	Indianapolis Drive Mix / Maceo Plex Edit
2014	Archive	"Again"	Maceo Plex Edit
2014	Chelsea Wolfe	"The Warden"	Maceo Plex Remix
2014	Crash Course in Science	"Flying Turns"	Maceo Plex Edit
2014	GusGus	"Crossfade"	Maceo Plex Mix
2014	Odd Parents	"Learn to Fly"	Maceo 808 Dub; Maceo's Flight Home Remix
2014	Röyksopp	"Sordid Affair"	Maceo Plex Mix
2014	The Iron Curtain	"The Condos"	Maceo Plex Remix
2014	The Smiths	"How Soon Is Now"	Maceo Plex Edit
2014	WhoMadeWho	"Heads Above"	Maceo Plex Dub; Maceo Plex Remix
2015	Dionigi	"Vitamin B1 / Energy From the Vacuum"	Maceo Plex Edit
2015	Joy Wellboy	"The Magic"	Maceo Plex & Shall Ocin Dub
2015	Maceo Plex featuring DNCN	"Eternal 808"	Maceo Plex Unreleased Remix
2015	Stephan Bodzin	"Powers of Ten"	Maceo Plex & Shall Ocin Remix
2015	Opale	"Sparkles and Wine"	Maceo Plex Mix
2015	Strange Cargo	"Million Town"	Maceo Plex & Dolores del Amo Club Mix
2016	Sailor & I	"Black Swan"	Maceo Plex Remix
2017	Dino Lenny	"Shoot Me to the Sky"	Maceo Plex Remix
2017	Rebolledo	"Discótico Pléxico"	Maceo Plex Remix
2017	Sefton	"Stranded In Passion"	Maceo Plex Remix
2018	Der Dritte Raum	"Hale Bopp"	Maceo Plex Edit
2018	Dino Lenny	"Guilty Officer"	Maceo Plex Remix
2018	Maribou State featuring Holly Walker	"Nervous Tics"	Maceo Plex Remix
2018	Remake	"Blade Runner"	Maceo Plex Renaissance Remix
2019	CJ Bolland & The Advent	"Camargue 2019"	Maceo Plex Remix
2020	Coldcut	"Timber"	Maceo Plex Remix
2020	Faithless featuring Nathan Bell	"Synthesizer"	Maceo Plex Remix
2020	Melawati	"Daliah"	Maceo Plex Remix
2020	New Order	"Be a Rebel"	Maceo Plex Remix
2020	Perry Farrell	"Let's All Pray for This World"	Maceo Plex Electro Remix; Maceo Plex Glitchy Remix; Maceo Plex Exclusive Remix
2020	Rone	"Babel"	Maceo Plex Remix
2021	Chromatics	"Shadow"	Maceo Plex Remix
2021	Faithless	"Insomnia"	Insomnia 2021

=== Unreleased edits and remixes ===
Year	Artist	Track	Title
2011	Liberty City	"That's What I Got"	Maceo Plex Re-Edit
2012	Depeche Mode	"Policy of Truth"	Maceo Plex Personal Edit
2012	Jack Rabbit	"Untitled"	Maceo Plex Edit
2012	Steve Reich & Coldcut	"Music for 18 Musicians"	Maceo Plex Remix
2012	The Revenge featuring Danielle Moore	"Just Be Good to Me"	Maceo Plex Remix
2013	Kavinsky featuring Lovefoxxx	"Nightcall"	Maceo Plex Edit
2013	The Rolling Stones	"Heaven"	Maceo Plex Re-Edit
2014	Jeanette Thomas	"Shake Your Body"	Maceo Plex Remix
2015	Paul Hertzog	"Triumph" (Bloodsport OST)	Maceo Plex Remix
2016	Jan Hammer	"Crockett's Theme"	Maceo Plex Edit
2017	Anthony Rother	"Human Made"	Maceo Plex Edit

== Maetrik discography ==
=== Studio albums ===
- Quality Exertion (Treibstoff, 2002)
- Casi Profundo (Treibstoff, 2005)
- My Cyborg Depths (as Mariel Ito) (SCSI-AV, 2005)

=== Singles and extended plays ===
- Connect (Treibstoff, 2001)
- Bias Defiance EP (Chalant Music, 2002)
- Entering The Cycle EP (Immigrant, 2002)
- Maetrik / Brian Aneurysm - The Sober Scene (Iron Box Music, 2002)
- Remote EP (Iron Box Music, 2002)
- The Fall Out EP (Intrinsic Design, 2002)
- Freaky Flow (Big Chief, 2003)
- Echando Alma EP (Morris Audio Citysport Edition, 2003)
- Force Feeling (Treibstoff, 2003)
- My Specs (Treibstoff, 2003)
- Being Used (Iron Box Music, 2004)
- Tiny Destructor (Treibstoff, 2005)
- Cologne And Back (Treibstoff, 2005)
- The Prophecy (Tic Tac Toe Records, 2006)
- Maetrik vs. Mariel Ito - Data Addict EP (Affected Music, 2006)
- Aggravate Me (Stil Vor Talent, 2006)
- Polygon Bug (Iron Box Music, 2007)
- Transform EP (Regular, 2007)
- Future Will Survive (Treibstoff, 2007)
- Sexus (Regular, 2007)
- Space Chronic EP (Mothership, 2008)
- Hardwire EP (Iron Box Music, 2008)
- Advanced Mechanics E.P. (Treibstoff, 2008)
- They Love Terror E.P. (Treibstoff, 2009)
- Melted Mind EP (Mothership, 2009)
- Envy (Dumb-Unit, 2009)
- Maetrik / Maceo Plex - Clubs EP (Resopal Schallware, 2009)
- Choose Your System (Adam Beyer's Remix) (Treibstoff, 2009)
- Gliding Blind E.P. (Audiomatique Recordings, 2010)
- Simon Wish VS. Cruz + Lati / Maetrik Feat. Kule Runner - Dawn's Highway / Snorkel (Cocoon Recordings, 2010)
- So Real (Dumb-Unit, 2010)
- Unleash The Beast EP (Ellum Audio, 2012)
- The Reason (Cocoon Recordings, 2012)
- The Entity (Truesoul, 2012)
- Return EP (Clash Lion, 2017)
