= Sarah Main =

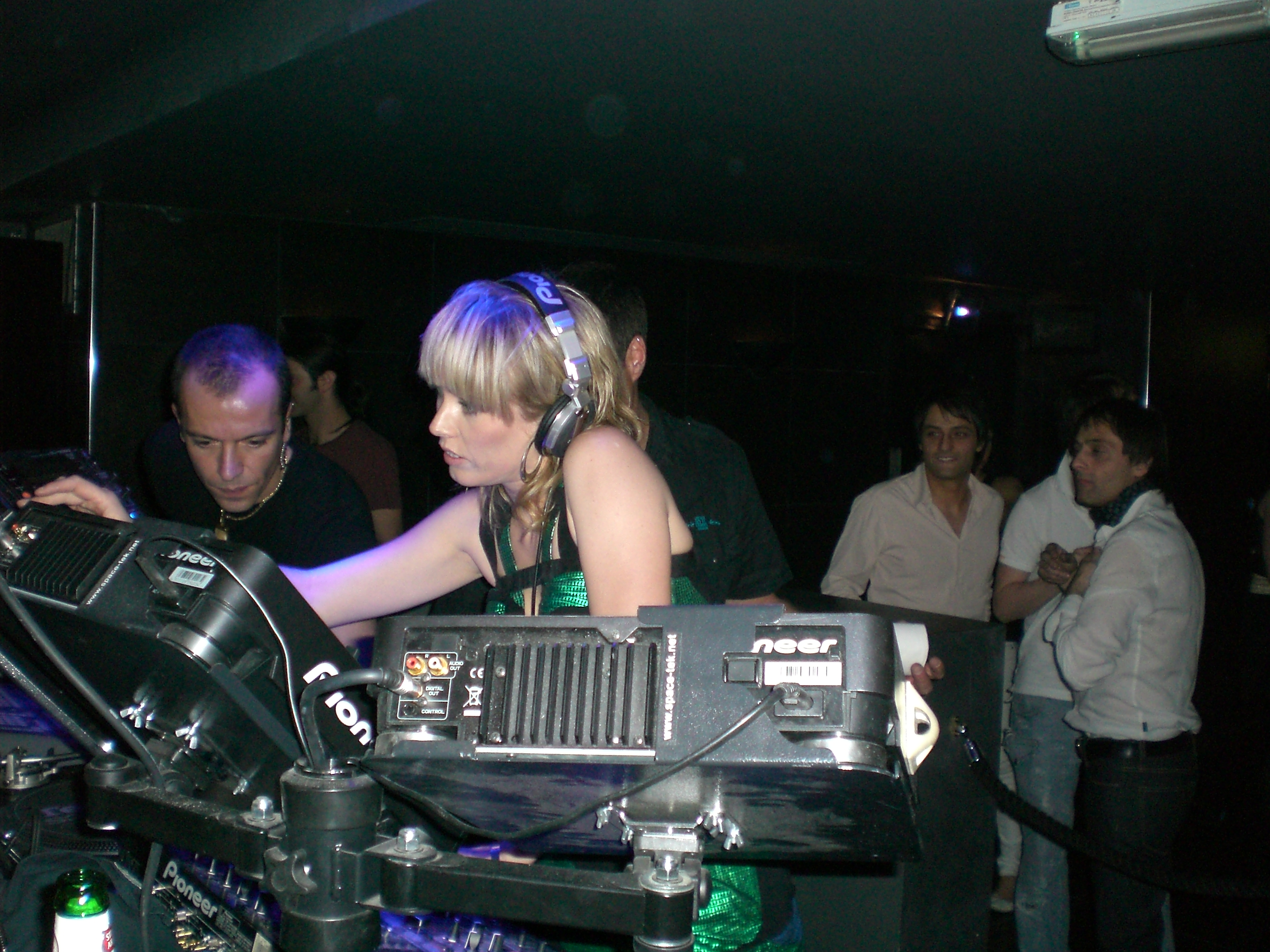

Background information
- Born: Sydney, Australia
- Origin: Ibiza
- Genres: House, tech house
- Occupations: DJ, producer, remixer
- Instruments: Turntable, sampler
- Years active: 1995–present
- Label: Pacha
- Website: www.sarah-main.com

Sarah Main is an Australian-born DJ working in Ibiza, most prominently associated with the club Pacha. She appeared as herself in the film It's All Gone Pete Tong. Apart from her regular Ibiza appearances, Main has DJ internationally at many clubs in Europe.
