= Guy Gerber =

Israeli musical artist

- Born: Guy Avraham Gerber; 1974 (age 51–52)
- Origin: Israel
- Genres: Techno, house, progressive house
- Occupations: Record producer, songwriter, disc-jockey
- Years active: 2002–present
- Labels: Supplement Facts, Cocoon, Rumors
- Website: guygerber.life

Guy Avraham Gerber (born 1974), is an Israeli electronic DJ/producer and musician who works in the underground techno scene. His projects range from collaborating with some international hip hop stars, to starting a left-field night at the Ibiza club, the Pacha.

== Background ==
Gerber was born in 1974. As he began fiddling with drum machines and synths, Gerber soon developed a passion for music and found himself drawn to English guitar acts like Joy Division and Irish guitar acts like My Bloody Valentine. Consequently, his harmonic, shoe-gaze inspired sound was a style that saw Gerber record for various European electronic labels, including 'Stoppage Time' for John Digweed's Bedrock imprint.

== Career ==
After contributing a track to the label's 'Cocoon Compilation F' album, Gerber's first full-length album 'Late Bloomers' was released on Sven Väth's Cocoon Recordings imprint in June 2007 and featured two worldwide club hits in 'Belly Dancing' and 'Sea of Sand' which he recorded with his Israeli production friend Shlomi Aber. Following this album, Gerber released 'My Invisible Romance'. In addition to his productions, Gerber also found time to remix New Order and Dominik Eulberg as well as setting up his own label Supplement Facts. In 2012 and 2013, the artist delivered a Fabric album made up of entirely original new productions; then 'Who's Stalking Who' was an LP closer to an extended composition than anything else. More recently, Gerber has remixed worthy mentions such as 'The L Word' by Deniz Kurtel and 'Hungry for the Power' by Azari & III.

As a performer, Gerber has been consistently rated one of the best acts in dance music, topping as a top 10 performer for the last three years on Resident Advisor. When DJing, he is noted for his extended sets such as a 12-hour performance at Burning Man in 2014. Gerber's 2013 Wisdom of the glove residency at Pacha caught the New York Times' attention. 12 months later, he went ahead with a clandestine free Ibiza beach party he called, Rumors. On top of his performances, Gerber had helped curate and A&R many underground music talents. His label, Supplement Facts, hosted artists from Chaim, to dOP, Guti and Kate Simko. However, as it was reaching its apex, Gerber put this project on hold to launch a new imprint Rumors. The new project was launched with Gerber's collaboration with Dixon, "No Distance".

Similarly to Supplement Facts, Rumors reintroduces Gerber's attention to the visual aesthetic. The artist has been seen collaborating with artists all over the globe such as with Miss Kittin on the critically acclaimed 'Rumors on The Dancefloor' EP. Rumors has also released many EPs from other high-profile artists, like Seth Troxler, as well as upcoming talents with unique styles, such as Clarion or Acid Mondays.

However, Rumors has also been launching accompanying event series in the summer of 2014. For instance, Rumors hosted a series of free parties in Ibiza with a laid back atmosphere, thanks to its setting in the Playa d'En Bossa beach. However, the Rumors parties rejected the mega-lineup announcements and posters across the rest of the island. There was very little information and it would all be given up last minute. Despite this unusual approach, Rumors parties saw huge artists like sasha, Miss Kittin, Kenny Glasgow and Matthew Dear sharing the sets alongside Gerber and the label's upcoming artists.

Following these events, Rumors has not ceased to spread worldwide with events at 'Art Basel Miami 'and stages at 'BPM Mexico' and 'We Are FSTVL' in London proving. Although Gerber has been scattering his performances all across the globe, his vision of the perfect musical event remains the same, "The night has a very particular flow... it has to start very deep, very spiritual, and it slowly builds up, never too fast. " RUMORS take place at Playa Soleil Ibiza during the summer 2024 with a lot of talented guests for this season.

== Discography selection ==
- 2002: Electric Mistress
- 2004: SStoppage Time
- 2005: Turkish Delight
- 2006: Sea of Sand
- 2006: This Is Balagan
- 2007: Belly Dancing
- 2009: Timing
- 2012: The Mirror Game
- 2016: Secret Encounters EP
- 2017: Here Comes the Rain EP
- 2018: What to Do EP
- 2023: "Leave It On" EP

Albums:

- 2007: Late Bloomers
- 2014: 11 11 with Puff Daddy

Remix:

- Dominik Eulberg – Bionik
- New Order – Waiting for the Sirens
- Azari & III – Hungry for the Power

== See also ==
- List of ambient music artists
