= Loco Dice =

Tunisian DJ and electronic music producer (born 1974)

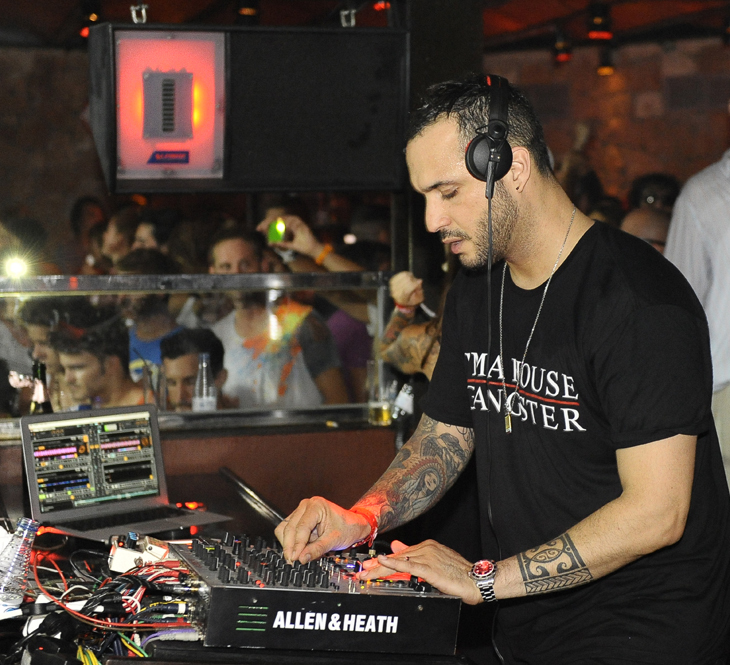
- Loco Dice performing at Amnesia in 2012

Background information
- Born: Yassine Ben Achour; 10 August 1974 (age 52); Düsseldorf, North Rhine Westphalia, Germany
- Genres: House; tech house; techno; hip hop (early)
- Occupations: DJ; record producer; songwriter
- Years active: 1994–present
- Label: Desolat
- Website: locodice.com

Loco Dice (born Yassine Ben Achour on 10 August 1974) is a Tunisian-German DJ and electronic music producer born and based in Düsseldorf, Germany. He is best known for his work in the house and tech house genres and his residencies at Ibiza nightclubs Space and Hi Ibiza.

== Background and career ==
Loco Dice was born to Tunisian parents, who immigrated to Düsseldorf, where he was born and raised. Loco Dice started his career as a hip hop DJ and rapper, establishing a residency at local Düsseldorf club Salon des Amateurs, before gaining support slots for performers such as Usher, Ice Cube, Jamiroquai, Snoop Dogg and R. Kelly.

He eventually transitioned to house and techno, upon the urging of fellow DJs, Timo Maas and Sven Vath, after a summer in Ibiza in 2002. Since then, Dice has been a staple in the electronic music scene performing at venues such as Space, Fabric, or Time Warp. He has released records on labels such as Ovum, M-nus, Cadenza, Cocoon and Four Twenty, as well as his own imprint label, Desolat. He also compiled and mixed Time Warp 07, a double CD featuring various minimal tracks.

Since 2002, Dice has been a staple on the Ibiza summer circuit, formerly with Carl Cox at Space and Ushuaïa but as of 2022, dividing his time between Pacha and Hi Ibiza. Outside the dance music scene, Dice has written runway soundtracks for Argentine-Italian fashion designer Marcelo Burlon during Men's Fashion Week in Milan for the FW2020 and SS2020 seasons.

== Discography ==
=== Albums ===
- 7 Dunham Place (4x12") Desolat (DMD Discomania), 2009 / CD / digital) Desolat, 2009
- Underground Suicide (4x12" + 4 Remix 12"s + USB Stick Vinyl Box / digital) Desolat / Ultra Music, 2016
- Love Letters (3x12" / digital) Desolat, 2018
- Purple Jam Universal Music, 2025

=== Singles / EPs ===
- Phat Dope Shit (PDS) - Four:Twenty Recordings (2002)
- City Lights / Dynamite Love - Four:Twenty Recordings (2003)
- Cellar Door - Four:Twenty Recordings (2003)
- Menina Brasileira - Ovum Recordings (2005)
- Harissa - Cadenza Recordings (2006)
- Carthago - Cocoon Recordings (2006)
- Flight LB 7475 / El Gallo Negro - Ovum Recordings (2006)
- Seeing Through Shadows - M_nus (2006)
- Porcupine / Latex - Rebelone Recordings (2006)
- Pimp Jackson Is Talkin' Now!!! (2008)
- Untitled - Desolat (2009)
- Definition - Desolat (2009)
- La Bicicletta - Cocoon Recordings (2010)
- Knibbie Never Comes Alone / Loose Hooks - M_nus (2011)
- Toxic - Desolat (2012)
- Lolopinho - Desolat (2013)
- Slow Moves - Cocoon Recordings (2013)
- Get Comfy feat. Giggs - Ultra Music (2016)
- Keep It Low feat. Chris Liebing - Ultra Music (2016)
- Party Angels feat. JAW - Ultra Music (2016)
- $lammer - Cuttin' Headz (2018)
- Positive Vibin' - KMS (2018)
- Roots - Desolat (2018)
- Out of Reach - Desolat (2018)
- Sweet Nectar Blossom - En Couleur (2020)

=== Remixes ===
- Timo Maas - Help Me (Loco Dice Remix) - Perfecto Records (2002)
- Mousse T. - Toscana (Loco Dice Remix) - Peppermint Jam Germany (2003)
- Daniel Taylor - MORD - Four Twenty (2005)
- Layo & Bushwacka! - Life 2 Live (feat Green Velvet - Loco Dice Remix) - Olmeto (2006)
- Warren G feat. Snoop Dogg - Get U Down - Peppermint Jam Germany (2006)
- Raw G - Down You Get - Peppermint Jam Germany (2006)
- Martin Landsky - 1000 Miles (Loco Dice Remix) - Poker Flat Recordings (2006)
- Dani Koenig - Hard South Americans (Loco Dice Chunk The Funk Remix) - Four Twenty (2006)
- Terre Thaemlitz - Social Material/Class (Loco Dice Remix) - Mule Electronic (2007)
- Dennis Ferrer - Son Of Raw (Loco Dice 7emixes) - Objektivity (2007)
- Kevin Saunderson - Bassline (Loco Dice remix) - Planet E (2007)
- Kabale und Liebe & Daniel Sanchez - Mumbling Yeah (Loco Dice Tribute remix) - Remote Area (2007)
- Onur Özer - Eclipse (Loco Dice Remix) - Vakant (2008)
- Riz MC - Radar (Loco Dice In The Box remix) - Crosstown Rebels (2008)
- Tokyo Black Star - Game Over (Loco Dice Remix) - Innervisions (2008)
- Tiga - Beep Beep (Loco Dice Remix) - Turbo (2009)
- Eastmen - U Dig (Loco Dice Remix) - Soma Recordings (2011)
- Tripmastaz - Roll Dat (Loco Dice Mix) - Magnetic (2011)
- Paperclip People - Parking Garage Politics (Loco Dice Remix) - Planet E (2011)
- Carl Cox - Family Guy (Loco Dice Remix) - Intec (2011)
- Mr. Tophat & Art Alfie - Crab At The Green Hunter (Loco Dice Remix) - Karlovak (2014)
- Basement Jaxx - Mermaid of Salinas (Loco Dice Remix) - Atlantic Jaxx (2015)
- Nightmares On Wax - A Case Of Funk (Loco Dice Remix) - WARP (2015)
- Neneh Cherry - Everything (Loco Dice Remix) - Smalltown Supersound (2015)
- youANDme feat. Black Soda - Take Away (Loco Dice Remix) - Desolat (2015)
- Disclosure - Magnets (Loco Dice Remix) - Universal (2015)
- Black Coffee - Buya (Loco Dice Remix) - Get Physical (2016)
- Moby - Go (Loco Dice Mo' Strings Remix) - Desolat (2016)
- Kerri Chandler - Six Pianos (Loco Dice Remix) - Katz Theory (2017)
- Jerome Hadey feat RZA - Tomorrow (Loco Dice Remix) - Vinyl Factory (2018)
- Timo Maas - Dark Society (Loco Dice Remix) - Desolat (2018)
- Guti - Red Eye (Loco Dice Remix) - Cuttin' Headz (2018)
- Skrillex, Boys Noize & Ty Dolla $ign - Midnight Hour (Loco Dice Remix) - 2019

=== Compilations ===
- DC10 Monday Morning Sessions - Four Twenty (2005)
- Minimal Explosion - Mixmag (2005)
- Green & Blue - Cocoon Recordings (2005)
- Electronic Flavors #1 - Phillip Morris (2006)
- Time Warp - Time Warp (2007)
- The Lab - NRK (2009)
- Ten Years Cocoon Ibiza - Cocoon Recordings (2009)
- Amnesia Underground #10 - Amnesia (2010)
- 5 Years Desolat - Desolat (2013)
- Loco Dice in the House - Defected (2013)
- Past + Present - Mixmag (2015)

=== Special ===
- VJ - Battle of the DJs - MTV (2002)
- Runway Music for Marcelo Burlon - Men Fashion Week Milan SS19 - (2019)
- Runway Music for Marcelo Burlon - Men Fashion Week Milan SS20 - (2020)
