= DOP (band) =

dOP
- Origin: France
- Genres: Electronic
- Years active: 2006–present
- Labels: Circus Company
- Members: Damien Vandesande; Jonathan Illel
- Past members: Clément Aichelbaum; Fabien Leseure

dOP is a French electronic music trio. Since their inception in 2006, they have received recognition in the electronic music landscape securing a spot on Resident Advisor's Top Live Acts for 2010, 2011 and 2012.

== Career ==
The trio is composed of childhood friends Damien Vandesande, Clément Aichelbaum, and Jonathan Illel who worked together on numerous projects before establishing themselves under the moniker dOP, following experimentation with different styles from Hip-Hop to Rock. They began making waves in the Electronic/house circuit with a string of single and EP releases on various labels, including their own (Circus Company), Milnor Modern, Eklo, Supplement Facts and more.

In 2010, they launched their first full length album Greatest Hits, a tongue-in-cheek title for the then-newcomers.

== Discography ==
=== Albums ===
- 2010: Greatest Hits, Circus Company

=== Singles & EPs ===
- 2007: Between the Blues EP, Circus Company
- 2007: No Passport EP, Milnor Modern
- 2008: "Blanche Neige", Circus Company
- 2008: I'm Just a Man EP, Eklo
- 2008: "Panik", Milnor Modern
- 2008: Varoslav feat. dOP - "Inside Ways", Supplement Facts
- 2008: "The Lighthouse", Orac Records
- 2008: God Bless the Child EP, Orac Records
- 2009: Varoslav feat. dOP - "I Love Us", Dirt Crew Recordings
- 2009: "The Genius of the Crowd", Supplement Facts
- 2009: Martyn / dOP - Tucan EP, Watergate Records
- 2009: I'm Just a Man Remix EP, Eklo
- 2009: dOP & Lula Circus - Cange! A Various EP, Children of Tomorrow
- 2009: Dein Varlangen EP, Eklo
- 2010: Youandwean / dOP - Sub Rosa EP, Magicbag
- 2010: Penguin EP, Watergate Records
- 2010: "3 Suitcases", Circus Company
- 2010: "L’Hôpital, La Rue, La Prison", Circus Company
- 2010: President Bongo & dOP - "Gossip Rats", I'm Single
- 2010: VSOP - Dein Verlangen Remix EP, Eklo
- 2011: "Your Sex", Supplement Facts
- 2011: "No More Daddy", Circus Company
- 2011: Seuil & dOP - Prostitute EP, Eklo
- 2011: Masomenos & Dop - Masomenos & Friends Project: 8, Welcome to Masomenos
- 2011: "After Party", Life and Death
- 2012: The Odyssey of Dreamy Peace EP, Apt. International
- 2012: "Kisses", Circus Company

=== DJ mixes ===
- 2008: LWE Podcast 02, Little White Earbuds
- 2010: Watergate 06, Watergate Records
- 2010: Sgustok Magazine Podcast 001, Sgustok Magazine
- 2011: Trax 142, Trax Sampler
- 2014: Mpikan ta gidia sto mantri 001, Cocoon

=== Miscellaneous ===
- 2012: A.O.T.P feat. dOP - "OPA!", Snatch! Records
