= Defected Records =

British record label

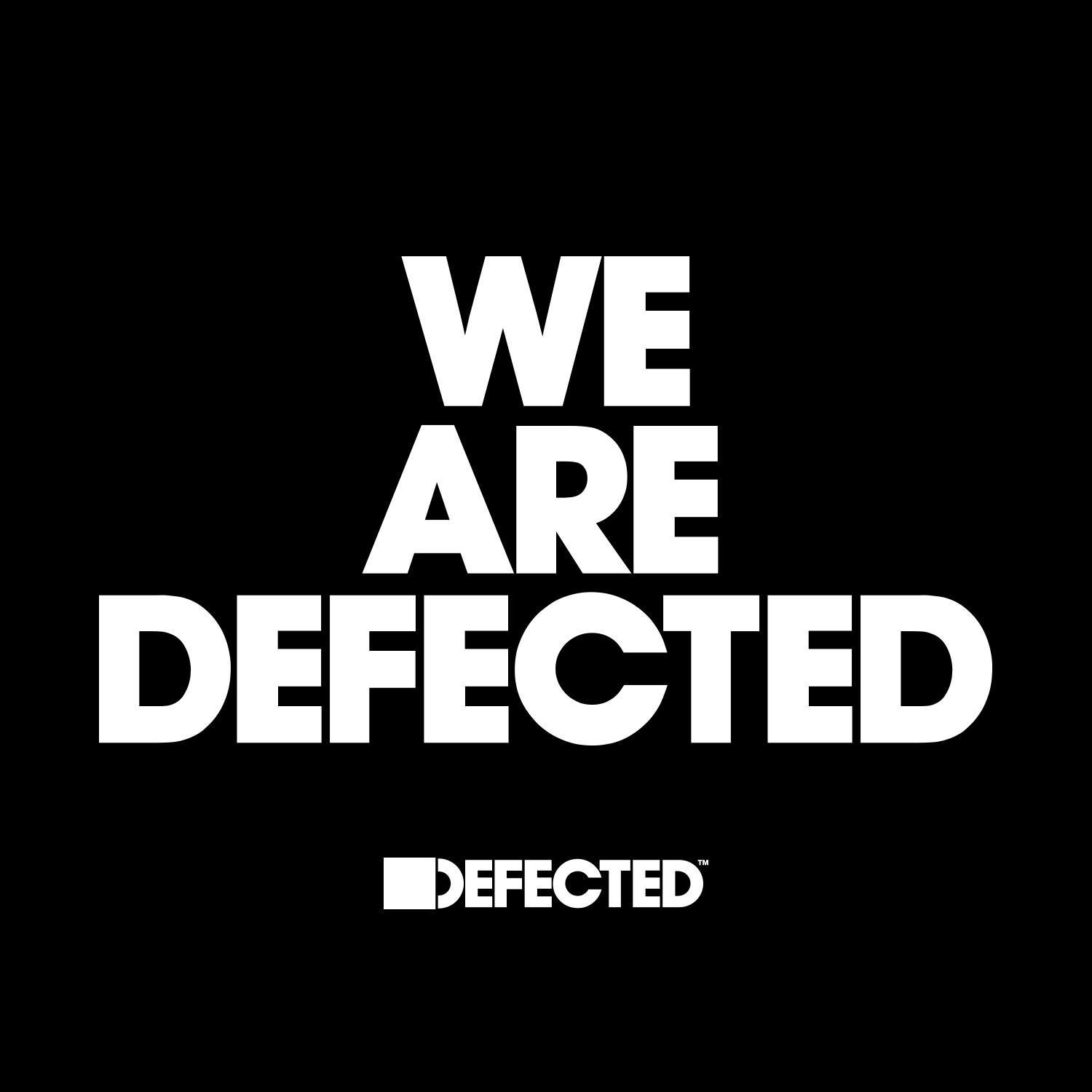
- Founded: January 1999; 27 years ago
- Founder: Simon Dunmore
- Genre: House music; deep house
- Country of origin: United Kingdom
- Location: London
- Official website: defected.com

Defected Records, or simply Defected, is a British independent record label specialising in house music recordings, compilation albums, events, publishing, artist bookings and management.

Defected is one of the longest running independent labels in the UK. Established in 1999 by Simon Dunmore in London, the label has played a significant role in the promotion and development of house music.

== History ==
Established in 1999 by former AM:PM and Cooltempo A&R specialist Simon Dunmore and initially funded by London nightclub and label Ministry of Sound, Defected's first release was Soulsearcher's "Can't Get Enough", which reached No. 5 on the UK Singles Chart. This early success was followed up with Roger Sanchez's "Another Chance", which hit No. 1 on the UK Singles Chart in 2001. Iconic club tracks such as Masters at Work's "To Be in Love" and Paul Johnson's "Get Get Down" dropped in Defected's first year, followed by Bob Sinclar's "I Feel for You" and Kings of Tomorrow's "Finally", with Julie McKnight.

In late 2016, Defected hit its 500th release, a catalogue that has included singles from artists such as Bob Sinclar, Kings of Tomorrow, Masters at Work, Inner City, Dennis Ferrer, Lenny Fontana, Roy Davis Jr., DJ Gregory, Mr G, MK and more recently Franky Rizardo, Purple Disco Machine, Amine Edge & Dance, Peggy Gou and many more.

In 2019, Defected celebrated its 20th anniversary, announcing a series of special events. Simon Dunmore mixed 2019's first edition of Radio 1's Essential Mix on 4 January 2019 that, in Dunmore's own words, provided "an insight into the music I love and that continues to influence everything we aspire to achieve at Defected Records".

In September 2022, Simon Dunmore sold Defected to investor Stephen Devonshire alongside the Chief Executive of the company Wez Saunders, through their takeover vehicle Optimum Defected Holdings Limited.

To celebrate its 25th anniversary in 2024, Defected Records announced a series of major events and releases. This includes a world tour with 25 residencies in 25 countries, a new podcast series, a special playlist, and a unique "Together" series featuring 25 new collaborative productions. This also involved moving its Ibiza residency to Ushuaïa.

== Significant releases ==
In 1999, Lenny Fontana released "What You Need" featuring Duane Harden's vocals. This debuted on Top of the Pops in the top 15 and went on to become a European radio hit in many countries worldwide.

In 2001, Roger Sanchez released "Another Chance" on the label, which went on to be an international hit, achieving Number 1 in the UK singles chart. Defected went on to celebrate further commercial success when Kings of Tomorrow released "Finally" in 2002. This was voted the 31st best track of 2000–2010 by electronic dance music portal Resident Advisor.

Swiss duo Shakedown's "At Night" reached No. 6 on the UK Singles Chart in 2002, and No. 1 on the UK Dance Chart.

The Defected in the House compilation launched in 2003 with Jay-J & Miguel Migs and has since featured artists such as Loco Dice, Gilles Peterson, the Shapeshifters, Louie Vega and Tensnake, as well as annual compilations dedicated to Ibiza and Miami, Croatia and other notable clubbing destinations.

Bob Sinclar's 2005 track "Love Generation" reached No. 12 in the UK and was a hit all over Europe and in Australia, achieving one of the longest runs of all time in the German singles charts and going on to sell over one million copies worldwide. The Irish duo Fish Go Deep also had success with their hit "Cure and the Cause" which stayed in the Beatport top 100 for almost a year.

During Defected's 10th year, the label found success with underground hits like Dennis Ferrer's "Hey Hey". In addition, they have released a number of underground hits from both seminal recordings artists and up and coming DJs and producers, including Inner City's "Future", Intruder feat. Jai's "Amame", Flashmob's "Need in Me", Pirupa's "Party Non Stop", Candi Staton's "Hallelujah Anyway", Noir & Haze's "Around", FCL's "It's You", Kings of Tomorrow feat. April's "Fall for You", Rachel Row's "Follow the Step" and Storm Queen's "Look Right Through", many of which have won awards or gone on to be some of the biggest club records of the year.

=== 2010s ===
In 2017, Defected released CamelPhat & Elderbrook's "Cola", which earned worldwide success and was nominated for Best Dance Recording at the 2018 Grammy Awards and Ivor Novello Awards, and went platinum in the UK and multiple international territories, an unprecedented success for an independent house music label in the UK.

In 2019, Defected celebrated its 20th anniversary. During the year, Defected released Roberto Surace's "Joys", which became the Italian producer's first No. 1 on Billboard's Dance Club Songs chart and joint ventured Shazam Ibiza dance charts (in its 12 October and 30 September 2019 issues, respectively).

In September 2019, the label released Endor's "Pump It Up!", Brighton producer Dan Hardingham's debut track with Defected. This track would reach No. 1 on Billboard's Dance Club Songs chart and would also reach number 8 on the UK Singles Chart with 18 weeks spent within the Official Charts Company's Top 75. Nowadays, Defected is considered for many as the most notable house music label in the UK.

=== 2020s ===
In 2020, Defected released a new Inner City single called "No More Looking Back", a record which featured actor Idris Elba.

It was announced on 20 April 2023 that the label will host a residency at Bali's Savaya Club from 7 to 28 July.

== Rebrand ==
As Defected Records approached its 15-year anniversary, it underwent a rebranding led by designer, DJ and producer Trevor Jackson, working alongside Defected founder Simon Dunmore as well as other members of the Defected team.

== Glitterbox ==
Glitterbox is a nightlife brand, conceptualised in 2014 by Defected boss Simon Dunmore. Glitterbox aims to create an "inclusive party atmosphere made to unite all ages and diversities on the dancefloor".

=== Ibiza ===
Glitterbox hosted its first event in Ibiza in 2014. Initially, the events were hosted at Space Ibiza, where it quickly garnered a reputation for its uplifting blend of house and disco music, along with its eclectic mix of performers and DJs.

After Space Ibiza closed, Glitterbox transitioned to Hï Ibiza (the newly build club in place of Space) in 2017, where it continues to host Sunday night parties.

Since 2023, Glitterbox has partnered with Radio 1 Dance to license their Radio 1 Dance X brand for the event at the start of August, as part of the Radio 1 Dance Weekend.

=== Radio show ===
Melvo Baptiste presents a weekly radio show - Glitterbox Radio - which is available on YouTube, SoundCloud, Spotify and Apple Podcasts. It is also syndicated on radio stations around the world.

=== Record label ===
Glitterbox Recordings has put out music by Aeroplane (featuring Tawatha Agee from Mtume), Purple Disco Machine, The Shapeshifters and Mousse T.

== Events ==
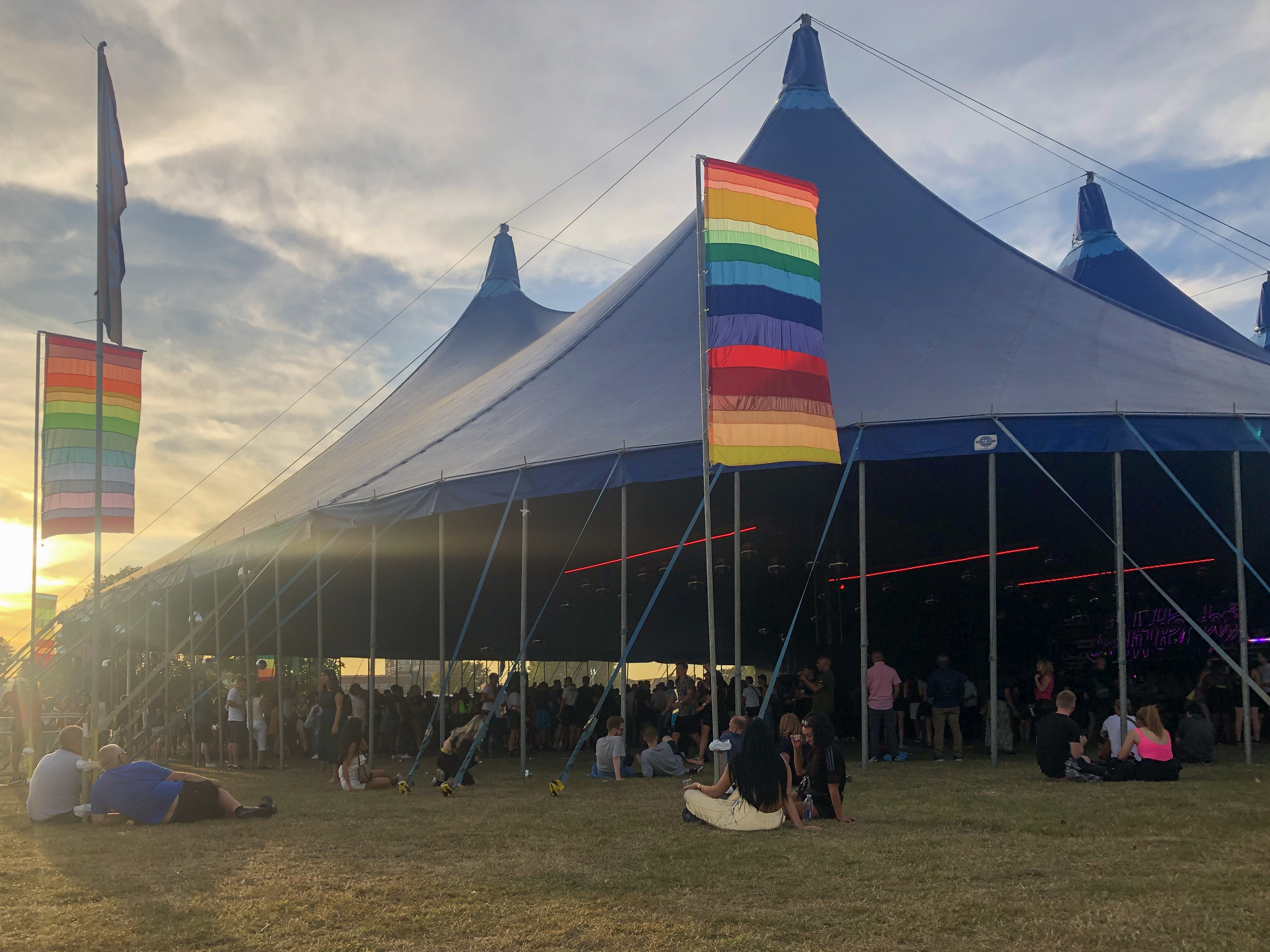
Defected London FSTVL, 2019

Defected holds regular events in London at Studio 338, Ministry of Sound and Printworks. They also tour the US, Australia and Europe.

=== Ibiza ===
Defected Records first hosted an event in Ibiza in 2001. This initial event marked the beginning of a long-standing relationship between the label and the island, with Defected becoming a prominent name in the Ibiza club scene over the years.

From 2006, Defected held a residency at Pacha Ibiza for 7 years, with 2012 being the last season at the club. In 2013, Defected took up residency at the Cipriani-owned Booom!, at which was the most successful night over the summer season. This ended after the 2014 season, following an ownership lawsuit which Booom! lost. The club subsequently closed down.

In 2015, Defected partnered with Together to host a residency every Tuesday at Amnesia from 9 June for 16 weeks.

The label announced in 2016 that it would take a hiatus from the island, instead concentrating on a new venture, Defected Croatia, taking place at the Garden Resort in Tisno, Croatia.

From the 2017 to 2023 seasons, Defected moved to Eden in San Antonio, holding a 20+ week residency there every Friday, along with hosting Café Mambo on Sundays.

For the 2024 season, Defected moved to Ushuaïa in Playa d'en Bossa, taking up a 22-event residency every Tuesday at the beach hotel to celebrate its 25th anniversary.

=== Croatia ===
Since 2016, Defected has annually hosted Defected Croatia during August in Tisno, Croatia.

The festival draws a crowd of 3,000 from across the world to experience the four-day event. Artists on the lineup have included Eats Everything, Sam Divine, MK, Kenny Dope, Franky Rizardo, Derrick Carter, Roger Sanchez, Claptone and Basement Jaxx.

The festival includes three stages onsite, boat parties and afterparties.

=== London ===
Defected marked its 20th anniversary in 2019 with its biggest event in the capital, Defected London Festival which took place at East London's Central Park. The festival hosted a crowd of 12,000 and had a line-up that included Masters at Work, Dennis Ferrer, Dimitri from Paris, Claptone, Sam Divine, Purple Disco Machine, The Shapeshifters, Miss Honey Dijon and more.

Founder of the label, Simon Dunmore talks of London's music scene, "The cultural and musical diversity in our city grows ever stronger and we are proud to bring people together through music. With it being our 20th anniversary this year, it just felt like the right moment to do our first London festival".

== Sub-labels ==
- 4 to the Floor Records
- Azuli
- Backrow Beats
- Bargrooves
- Big Love Music
- Classic Music Company
- D4 D4NCE
- DFTD
- DFX Records
- DVINE Sounds
- Faith
- Faya Combo
- Fluential Records
- 4 to the Floor
- Fourth Floor Records
- Freeze Records
- Glitterbox Recordings
- ITH Records
- K4B Records
- Movin' Records
- Nu Groove
- One People
- Slip 'N' Slide
- Sondela Recordings
- Soul Heaven
- Soulfuric Recordings
- Soulfuric Deep
- Soulfuric Trax
- Sub-Urban
- Yoruba
