= Sam Divine =

British house music disc jockey

- Born: Samantha Craddock
- Origin: Weston-super-Mare, England, UK
- Genres: House, dance, UK garage
- Occupations: Disc jockey, record producer, radio personality
- Years active: 2009-present
- Label: Defected Records
- Website: samdivine.co.uk

Samantha Craddock, known as Sam Divine, is a British disc jockey and record producer from Weston-super-Mare, England. Known as the "Queen of Defected Records", she performs regularly in Ibiza clubs and was named "Best House DJ" at the 2024 DJ Awards.

== Biography ==
Divine grew up in Weston-super-Mare, England, where she used to practise DJing in her mum's shed, and worked at Spin Central. Initially her musical preference was hard house as epitomised by Lisa Lashes and Lisa Pin-Up, but following a chance live booking she began to play more soulful house. Following another chance encounter, she began to work for Defected Records until in 2009 she was signed to the artists roster, including progressing to host the weekly Defected radio show. Divine has played live at a number of clubs and festivals, including Sankeys, Tomorrowland, Creamfields, and most clubs in Ibiza. In 2015 she set up her own record label, DVINE Sounds, to help new artists. She is alternately known as the "First Lady of Defected" or the "Queen of Defected".

Divine's 2016 mix album, Defected presents Sam Divine In The House, peaked at number 82 in the UK Compilation Chart. In September 2019 Divine performed a two-hour Essential Mix on BBC Radio 1, playing house music and acapellas. In 2024 she had a regular summer residency at Ushuaïa in Ibiza. Divine also produces music, including a remix of the track "Flowers" which was popular on both Beatport and Traxsource.

=== Awards and recognition ===
Divine won in the "Best House DJ" category at the 2024 annual DJ Awards.

== Discography ==
=== DJ Mixes ===
- Defected presents Sam Divine In The House (2016)
- Defected Ibiza 2018 (2018)

=== Singles ===
- 2016 Sam Divine & Qubiko - Madre (Original Mix)
- 2016 Sam Divine & Curtis Gabriel featuring Nat Conway - Confessions
- 2017 Sam Divine & Cassimm - What God Has Chosen
- 2017 Sam Divine & CASSIMM - Can't Stop The House
- 2017 Sam Divine & CASSIMM - To The Beat
- 2022 Sam Divine & Kormak - I Want You (Extended Mix)
- 2023 Sam Divine & Hayley May - Face In The Crowd (Original Mix)
- 2023 Sam Divine feat Josh Barry - Take My Hand (Extended Mix)
- 2024 Sam Divine feat. Josh Barry - Saved By The Record (Extended Mix)

=== Remixes ===
- 2015 Sweet Female Attitude - Flowers (Sam Divine & Curtis Gabriel Remix)
- 2019 Amira - My Desire (Sam Divine Remix)
- 2022 S.A.M. feat. Sarah Ikumu - Spotlight (Sam Divine Extended Remix)
- 2024 Dennis Ferrer featuring Janelle Kroll - Mind Ur Step (Sam Divine Remix)

== See also ==
- List of club DJs
