= Essential Mix =

BBC Radio 1 radio show

- Running time: 120 minutes (0:00–2:00 AM local time)
- Country of origin: United Kingdom
- Language: English
- Home station: BBC Radio 1
- Hosted by: Pete Tong
- Created by: Eddie Gordon
- Produced by: Eddie Gordon; Wise Buddah; Somethin' Else
- Original release: 30 October 1993 – present
- Website: Essential Mix

The Essential Mix is a weekly radio show on BBC Radio 1 currently broadcast between 0:00 and 2:00 a.m. UK time on Saturday morning. Originally broadcast on 30 October 1993, the Essential Mix features contemporary DJs and music producers of electronic dance music.

The show has been presented since its inception by Pete Tong and features an uninterrupted two-hour mix from a different artist each week, overlaid with occasional continuity announcements delivered by Tong. With a broadcast run of over 32 years, the Essential Mix is one of the longest-running programmes in the current BBC Radio 1 schedule.

== Background ==
The Essential Mix is a weekly radio show broadcast on BBC Radio 1, and features many styles of electronic dance music. It was created by Eddie Gordon, the producer of the show from the first broadcast in 1993 to 2001. The show has been hosted since its inception in 1993 by Pete Tong, who was also the first performer.

== History ==
In 1993, after months of receiving weekly mix shows on tape-cassette, featuring New York DJs Tony Humphries WRKS 98.7 Kiss FM and Frankie Knuckles WQHT HOT 97 FM, and recorded and mailed by U.S. Billboard's Dance Editor Brian Chin, Gordon advised BBC Radio 1 that a weekly dance-mix show with DJs of different genres of music would offer more variety and a chance to promote the UK dance music scene with both notable and upcoming DJs.

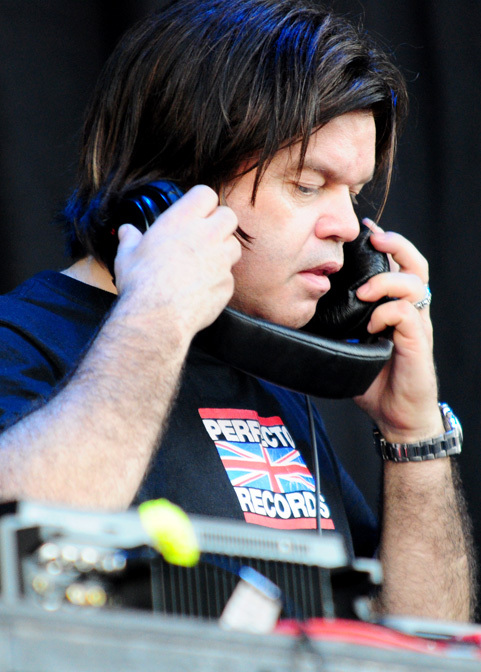
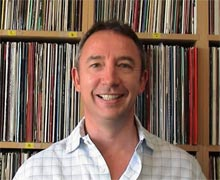
Paul Oakenfold and Eddie Gordon (both pictured in 2009).

Gordon further encouraged the DJs he scheduled to use their musical knowledge; a high number of listeners were recording the show on cassette to listen to later, so a straight out "4 to the floor" mix was not necessarily required, allowing the DJs to include more eclectic music or offer something different from their normal selections. Paul Oakenfold, after sitting with Gordon to blueprint his December 1994 Essential Mix, produced the Goa Mix, which won a Silver Award in the Specialist Music Programme category at the 1998 Sony Radio Awards, and in 2000, was voted the Best Ever Essential Mix by the BBC Radio 1 listeners.

In June 1997, David Holmes created another two hours in the history of the Essential Mix. His set included Nancy Wilson and Jimi Hendrix. In May 1998, Ashley Beedle, known for his house music style, completed a two-hour reggae mix.

=== Special events ===
Another Eddie Gordon initiative was to take the show on the road with live broadcasts from clubs or festivals, particularly during the summer months (Northern Hemisphere) and at New Year's Eve. The broadcasts started from within the UK, and soon broadened out as live from Ibiza, North America, Australia, South Africa, Germany, Hawaii and other destinations in Europe including Rome.

One special broadcast was the BBC Radio 1 - One World millennium celebration starting with Carl Cox from Bondi Beach in Sydney, before heading to Cape Town, South Africa with Danny Rampling prior to broadcasting Dave Pearce from Glasgow, Pete Tong from Liverpool, then Junior Vasquez from New York before closing with Carl Cox, who had flown backwards across the dateline to complete a DJ World first with two millennium gigs by broadcasting from Honolulu.

The forerunner to this New Year's Eve Essential Mix was the transatlantic three-cities broadcast on the New Year's Eve of 1997 into 1998, with simultaneous broadcasts from three clubs directly to each dance floor with Pete Tong at the Ministry Of Sound, London, Todd Terry at the Nynex Arena in Manchester, and finishing with DJ Eddie Baez at the Tunnel venue in Manhattan. The broadcast was produced by Eddie Gordon, who originated the idea of linking the three venues via ISDN broadcast.

The broadcasts from Ibiza have taken place every summer since the first Essential Mix live broadcast from Amnesia. The first ever Essential Mix from Ibiza came in the summer of 1995 Ibiza as a pre-recorded broadcast of Nicky Holloway playing live at nightclub Ku (today Privilege) on 2 July 1995.

On 29 July 2007, the Essential Mix broadcast mixes from Global Gathering festival featuring David Guetta, Erol Alkan, Sven Vath and Paul van Dyk.

31 December 2009 marked the special Essential Mix event that carried onto New Year's Day of 2010, at the O2 Arena in London, featuring artists like Deadmau5, Eric Prydz, Calvin Harris, Justice, Example, Dave Spoon and Plump DJs.

On 16 November 2013, on the 20th anniversary of the show, The Warehouse Project in Manchester hosted the Radio 1's Essential Mix for a live event. The talent included the show's host Pete Tong, amongst guests Eats Everything, Sasha, Booka Shade, Paul Woolford, Steve Lawler, Hot Since 82, James Zabiela, Skream b2b Jackmaster, Derrick Carter, amongst other residents of the club.

In January 2016, Pete Tong initiated a series of live club-based Essential Mix shows. The first event was in Los Angeles and featured DJ Richie Hawtin. On 3 September 2016, Cirez D, Chase & Status and Eric Prydz played at Creamfields.

On 20 October 2018, the Essential Mix featured The Martinez Brothers, Pete Tong and Eats Everything from The Warehouse Project in Manchester. In October 2021, the Essential Mix broadcast from ADE 2021 featuring mixes by Cinthie and Luuk van Dijk.

On 30 March 2019, Essential Mix featured Chris Liebing, Charlotte de Witte, Themba and Mele from Miami Music Week.

On July 7 & 8 2021, Essential Mix recorded mixes from Elrow at Circus in Liverpool featuring Yousef and Paul Woolford, with another mix recorded from Shindig in Newcastle featuring Carl Cox.

On 24 June 2023, the Essential Mix recorded mixes from the Glastonbury Festival, with Salute, Annie Mac and The Blessed Madonna billed for the event.

=== Ibiza specials ===
Radio 1's Essential Mix broadcast several Ibiza specials from nightclubs on the island since the show's inception. Usually, the show is held around the Ibiza weekend of the BBC Radio 1 broadcast, in July and August.

==== 2006 ====
- 7 August 2006: Live at Judgement Sundays at Eden Ibiza featuring Judge Jules and Sander van Doorn.
- 8 August 2006: Live at Cocoon at Amnesia featuring Andre Galluzzi and Sven Vath.
- 9 August 2006: Live at Space featuring Carl Cox and John Digweed.
- 13 August 2006: Featuring mixes from Fergie, Mauro Picotto, Paul Oakenfold, Steve Angello, Steve Lawler and Lisa Lashes.

==== 2007 ====
- 12 August 2007: Live at Amnesia featuring mixes from Eddie Halliwell, Sasha and Swedish House Mafia.

==== 2008 ====
- 3 August 2008: Live at Amnesia featuring mixes from John Digweed, Pete Tong, Eddie Halliwell, Judge Jules, Justice, Zane Lowe, Annie Mac and Kissy Sell Out.

==== 2009 ====
- 1 August 2009: Mixes from deadmau5, Luciano and Pete Tong recorded from Wonderland at Eden Ibiza.
- 8 August 2009: Live broadcast from Privilege Ibiza with Laidback Luke, Annie Mac, Pete Tong and Eric Prydz.

==== 2010 ====
- 6 August 2010: Pre-recorded mixes from Zane Lowe, Mark Ronson and Grandmaster Flash from Space.
- 7 August 2010: Pre-recorded mixes from Andre Galluzzi and Sven Vath at Cocoon, Amnesia.
- 8 August 2010: Live broadcast from Privilege Ibiza with Above & Beyond, Annie Mac, Pete Tong and Underworld.

==== 2011 ====
- 5 August 2011: Live broadcast from Space featuring Annie Mac, Benga, Deadmau5, Skream, Zane Lowe, Magnetic Man and Knife Party.
- 12 August 2011: Live broadcast from Space featuring Jamie Jones, Funkagenda, Mark Knight, Chuckie, Judge Jules and Kutski.

==== 2012 ====
- 3 August 2012: Featuring mixes from Carl Cox, Matt Tolfrey and DJ Sneak.
- 11 August 2012: Live broadcast from Privilege Ibiza featuring Pete Tong, Sebastian Ingrosso, Benny Benassi, Alesso and Chase & Status.

==== 2013 ====
- 2 August 2013: Pre-recorded mixes at Sankeys and DC10 featuring Jamie Jones, tINI, Steve Lawler and Darius Syrossian.
- 4 August 2013: Live broadcast from Privilege Ibiza featuring Pete Tong, Eric Prydz and Hardwell.

==== 2014 ====
- 1 August 2014: Live broadcast from Space featuring Richie Hawtin
- 3 August 2014: Above & Beyond, Annie Mac, Pete Tong, Sasha and Steve Angello were featured in a special live broadcast from Privilege Ibiza.
- 9 August 2014: Pre-recorded mix from Skream at We Love Space at Space.

==== 2015 ====
- 30 July 2015: Hot Since 82, Heidi, Miss Kittin and Maya Jane Coles were featured on the mix during a live broadcast from Space in Ibiza.

==== 2016 ====
- 23 July 2016: Andrea Oliva's set was recorded for the show, from Ushuaïa.
- 30 July 2016: Live broadcast from Pacha featuring Solomun.
- 5 August 2016: Live broadcast from Space featuring Carl Cox.
- 6 August 2016: Live broadcast from DC10 featuring Jamie Jones and Nathan Barato.

==== 2017 ====
- 5 August 2017: The Blessed Madonna, Richie Hawtin and Solomun's mixes pre-recorded and featured on the show.
- 12 August 2017: pre-recorded sets from Privilege Ibiza, featuring artists like Above & Beyond, High Contrast and Goldie.

==== 2018 ====
- 11 August 2018: the show was broadcast from Ushuaïa, and likes of Steve Lawler, Nic Fanciulli and Eli & Fur have played mixes for the show.

==== 2022 ====
- 30 July 2022: Live broadcast from Hï Ibiza featuring Vintage Culture.
- 31 July 2022: Live broadcast from Amnesia featuring Marco Faraone and Eats Everything.
- 6 August 2022: Live broadcast from Ushuaïa featuring Swedish House Mafia.

== New technologies ==
The advent of the internet brought the programme to an international audience for the first time (the BBC Radio 1 website launched in 1996). In 2002, the BBC launched their 'listen again' online radio service and the Essential Mix (along with the Essential Selection) and became consistently the most popular specialist music show of the whole BBC Radio network among internet users.

According to BBC server logs, the show receives around 50,000 online requests per week (though this can be significantly higher, with the 2003 Ibiza show attracting more than 96,000 requests), which compares to the show's "live" audience of 80,000. Whilst demand for a podcast of the show is high, the BBC has resisted making the show available in this way due to copyright issues, but the development of peer-to-peer internet technologies has spawned a new trend in which fans of the show make recordings of mixes available to users of services such as BitTorrent and eMule. Although illegal, the BBC has taken little action against such activity.

Many torrent sites and internet forums still continue to provide MP3 download links to past shows, which can be found easily through internet search engines.

== Essential Mix of the Year ==
At the end of each year, a shortlist of the most popular Essential Mixes from that year is drawn up by the BBC. Listeners were previously invited to vote for their favourite shortlisted mix in a poll on the Essential Mix website around two weeks before the final show of the year; and now, the mix of the year is selected by the show's team. The mix with the majority of the votes is given the title of Essential Mix of the Year and is replayed in the final show of the year.

The exception for the proper nomination of the Essential Mix of the Year award was in 2007, when voting and competitions were suspended on BBC Radio 1 until further notice, due to failures in various BBC competition voting systems. In 2007, the title (High Contrast) was chosen by Pete Tong and the BBC Radio 1 Essential Mix team.

- 1995: Tony de Vit (1995-01-08)
- 1997: David Holmes (1997-06-15)
- 1999: Basement Jaxx (1999-05-02)
- 2000: Dave Clarke (2000-01-16)
- 2001: Sander Kleinenberg (2001-06-10)
- 2002: Sasha & John Digweed (2002-04-07)
- 2004: Above and Beyond (2004-06-06)
- 2005: Sasha (2005-05-22)
- 2006: Trentemøller (2006-10-15)
- 2007: High Contrast (2007-10-07)
- 2008: Flying Lotus (2008-11-29)
- 2009: Sharam (2009-08-29)
- 2010: Swedish House Mafia (2010-09-04)
- 2011: Above and Beyond (2011-07-02)
- 2012: Nicolas Jaar (2012-05-19)
- 2013: Eric Prydz (2013-02-02)
- 2014: Caribou (2014-10-18)
- 2015: Ben Klock (2015-10-10)
- 2016: Midland (2016-02-20)
- 2017: Helena Hauff (2017-02-25)
- 2018: HAAi (2018-09-29)
- 2019: Josey Rebelle (2019-02-09)
- 2020: Sherelle (2020-11-14)
- 2021: Elkka (2021-11-13)
- 2022: KH (2022-07-09)
- 2023: None Chosen
- 2024: Sammy_Virji (2024-08-31)
- 2025: Carl Cox (2025-09-14)

To mark the 500th DJ/artist to appear in the series, in April 2010, BBC Radio 1 selected ten classic Essential Mixes to reflect the show's history:

- 1993-10-30: First show, Pete Tong studio session.
- 1994-12-18: Paul Oakenfold's Goa Mix.
- 1996-07-28: First live Ibiza show – Danny Rampling, Sasha, Pete Tong.
- 1997-03-02: Daft Punk studio session.
- 1997-06-15: David Holmes Funk & Soul mix.
- 1998-05-02: Pete Tong, Sasha and Paul Oakenfold at first Creamfields.
- 1999-12-31: Carl Cox Millennium Eve.
- 2005-05-22: Sasha at Maida Vale.
- 2008-11-29: Flying Lotus
- 2009-01-17: Greg Wilson

== See also ==
- Essential Selection – BBC radio show
