= Yann Pissenem =

French businessman (born 1975)

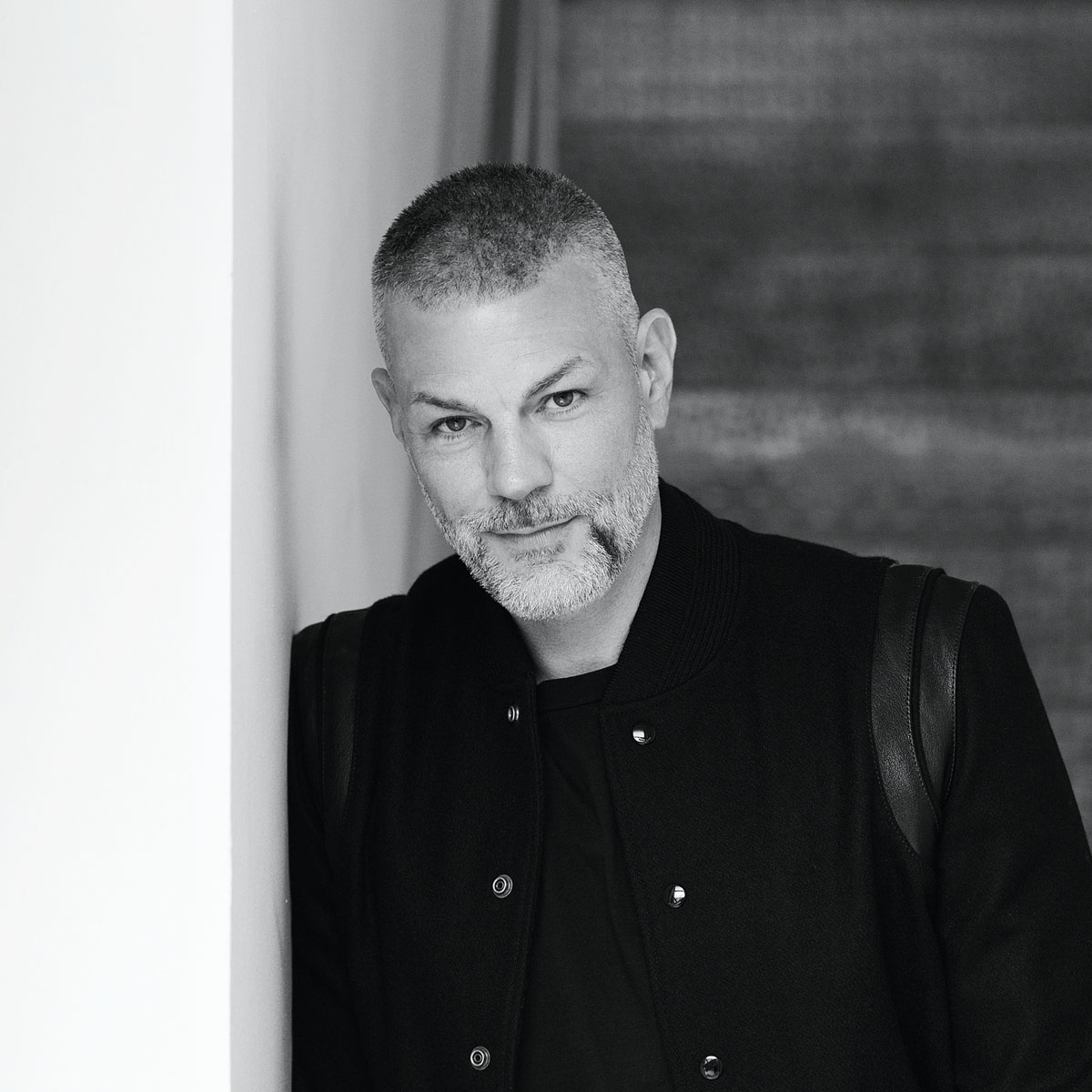
- Born: Nancy, France
- Occupation: Entrepreneur
- Years active: 2001 - present
- Organization: The Night League
- Known for: Founding The Night League
- Notable work: Hï, Ushuaïa and UNVRS Ibiza
- Website: https://www.thenightleague.com/yann-pissenem

Yann Pissenem is a French nightlife entrepreneur and entertainment industry investor. He is best known for his contributions to the European nightlife scene, predominantly in Ibiza. He is the owner, founder and CEO of The Night League and Ushuaïa Entertainment, the companies behind the Ushuaïa brand, the world's number 1 ranked club (2022, 2023, 2024, & 2025) Hï Ibiza, and [UNVRS], a new club that opened in Ibiza in 2025.

== Early life ==
Pissenem was born in 1975 in Nancy, France, and grew up in a little village nearby alongside his brother Romain, his father who was the local mayor, and his mother who was a teacher. Pissenem's journey in the nightlife industry began whilst studying law in the early 1990s, after he started organising rave parties in France and Belgium.

== Career & business ventures ==
In 1994, Pissenem moved to Spain to study tourism. He worked at numerous bars and nightclubs in Barcelona throughout the 1990s before launching his own venues and events. The success of these businesses, together with his growing reputation and his passion for electronic music, led him to create The Night League, the nightlife and entertainment events company he founded in 2001. In 2008, he left mainland Spain to open a chiringuito (small beach bar) in Ibiza.

At the time, Ibiza was dominated by "the big four" nightclubs, which operated in a traditional way, with young revellers partying all night into the morning. Pissenem saw an opportunity to create a new daytime club experience that bridged different age groups. He discovered a remote beach bar in Playa d'en Bossa, which reminded him of the Patagonian city Ushuaia, known as the "end of the world." He launched Ushuaïa Ibiza at the location later that year. The small beach bar, which started offering a luxury daytime experience with comfortable sun beds, drinks and music, quickly became popular.

Pissenem partnered with Abel Matutes and together they redeveloped a nearby hotel and converted it into Ushuaïa Ibiza Beach Hotel. A couple of years later, the complex was extended with the addition of Ushuaia Tower. Upon completion, the 415 room hotel and club could host over 7,000 people. It quickly became one of the best open air venues in the world, winning multiple awards including International Dance Music Awards Best Global Club on four occasions, and had been recognised by DJ Mag as a top 10 club worldwide every year for a decade. It also won the prestigious International Nightlife Association's top club in the world on two occasions. Many hotels have since copied his business model, including numerous Las Vegas hotels.

Following the closure of one of the island's best known clubs Space, Pissenem brought forward plans to open a new superclub. Hï Ibiza was opened in 2017 and quickly received acclaim. In 2022, Pissenem's club won "Best Club in the World" accolade from DJ Mag and held the title in 2023 and 2024. The two venues collectively have gone on to host some of the biggest names in dance music over the past decade, including Black Coffee, David Guetta, Eric Prydz, FISHER, Glitterbox, and The Martinez Brothers. They have also hosted major events for the likes of BBC Radio 1.

Pissenem and his team at The Night League announced the launch of the Ushuaïa Dubai Harbour Experience, the company's first major venture outside Europe. The new winter residency is a joint partnership with Dubai-based Studio A by Addmind Hospitality. Set to open in October 2024, the Dubai event host performances from electronic music artists including Calvin Harris and Adriatique, Black Coffee and others.

Most recently, Pissenem announced the planned opening of "the world's first hyperclub", [UNVRS], on Ibiza in 2025. Notably, American actor Will Smith teased the opening on social media. Speaking to Billboard, Pissenem described it as "a space that offers the best elements of a club, the infrastructure of an arena, and the best hospitality in the world".
