= Kadosh (musician) =

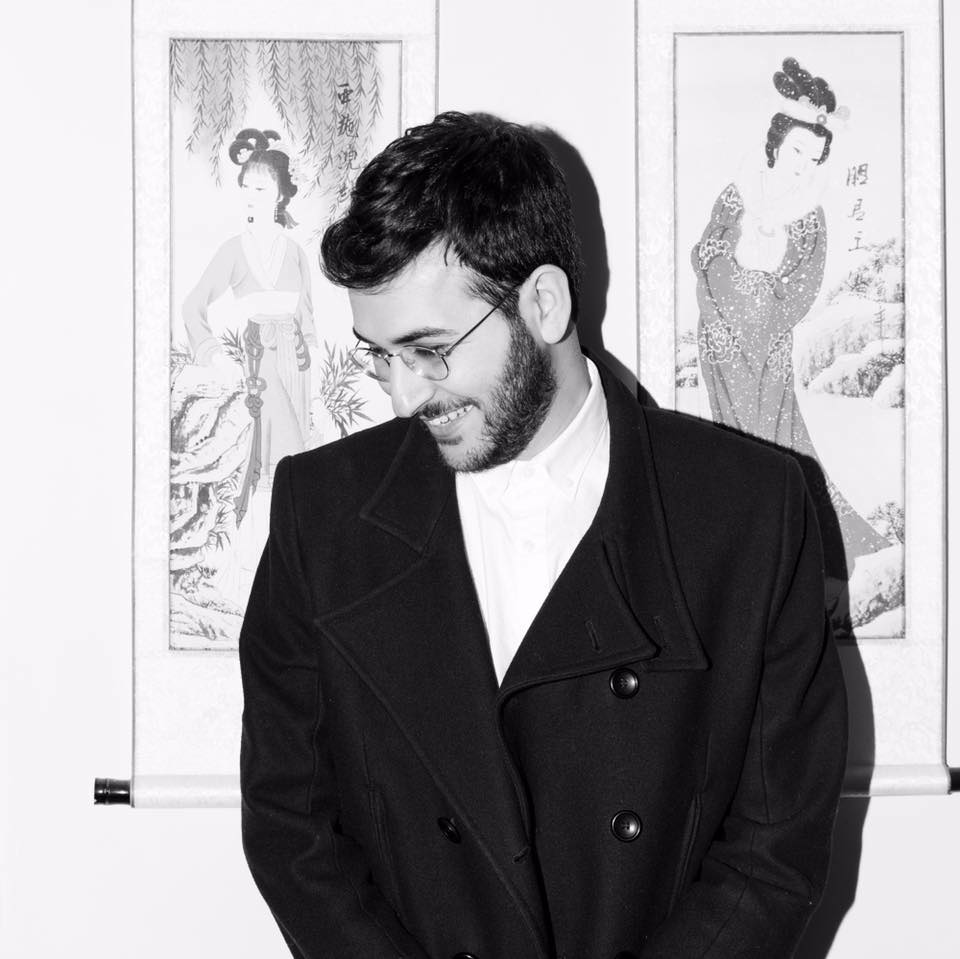
- Kadosh in 2026

Background information
- Born: Amiram Kadosh; 1994 (age 31–32)
- Genres: Deep House, Electronica, Techno, Melodic House
- Occupations: DJ, record producer
- Instrument: Piano
- Years active: 2016- present
- Labels: Frau Blau ,Innervisions, Crosstown Rebels, Nervous

Amiram Kadosh (born 1994) is an Israeli electronic music producer and DJ, known for his work within the house and techno scenes and for releases on international electronic music labels.

== Early life and background ==
Kadosh was born in Israel in 1994 and began studying piano at the age of 12.

Following the death of his mother, he was sent to study at an agricultural boarding school, where he later received a scholarship to attend a DJ college, marking a formative stage in his musical development. During his teenage years, he was exposed to hip hop and soul music before discovering electronic music while attending club events in Tel Aviv.

He later transitioned into DJing and music production, becoming active within the local underground electronic music scene.

== Career ==
Kadosh gained wider recognition in the late 2010s through releases and performances within the international electronic music circuit.

His work has appeared on labels such as Innervisions, Watergate Records, Disco Halal, Aeon, and Stil vor Talent.

In 2021, media coverage highlighted his role as the founder of the independent electronic music imprint Frau Blau Music.

In 2021, Kadosh was featured again by When We Dip, with coverage highlighting his growing international profile, releases on labels such as Innervisions and Watergate Records, and his role as curator of the Frau Blau label.

In 2022, Kadosh released the collaborative album Unanimously on the Stil vor Talent label, composed entirely of collaborations with other electronic music producers.

In 2025, Kadosh appeared on BBC Radio 1 Dance as a guest on Pete Tong’s show, presenting a guest mix and participating in an extended interview as part of the station’s electronic music programming.

He has performed at international venues and festivals, including the OFFSonar Festival in Barcelona and clubs such as Watergate in Berlin and Fabric (club), OFFSónar in Barcelona and Ushuaïa Nightclub.

His later work continued to receive international coverage, including interviews discussing his touring activity and artistic approach.

== Musical style ==
Kadosh's productions are commonly associated with house music and techno, characterized by melodic structures and groove-oriented arrangements. His work often blends contemporary electronic club music with influences drawn from hip hop and soul music, reflecting a broad range of stylistic references.

== Discography ==
=== Albums ===
- Unanimously (2022, Stil vor Talent)

=== EP's ===
- Skipping Stones EP (2024)
- Hidden Desire EP (2023)
- Tropicana Rave EP (2023)
- The Soundtrack EP (2023)
- Matane EP (2022)
- Never Too Late Remixes (2022)
- Pleasant Dreams EP (2020)
- Cosmo Disco EP (2020)
- Toy Carousel EP (2020)
- Allenby 94 EP (2017)
- Rush Hour EP (2017)

=== Singles ===
- “A Night in Bombay / Hearing Voices” (2024)

- "Concealing" feat. Max Joni/ Nervous Records (2024)
- "Connect" Feat. Like Mike / Green room records (2025)
- Learning to Love (2025)
- One Remedy (2025)
- Connect (Remixes) (2025)
- In a Manner of Speaking (2025)
- DWY (2025)
- Connect (2025)
- Intention (2025)
- LOVE Remixes (2025)
- Let Me See You (Remixes) (2025)
- Quartz (2024)
- Quiero Mas (Kadosh Remix) (2024)
- LOVE (2024)
- Let Me See You (2024)
- Asking Much (Kadosh Remix) (2024)
- A Night in Bombay / Hearing Voices (2024)
- Wake Up (2024)
- All Night Long (2024)
- Concealing (2024)
- In the Dark (Kadosh Remix) (2024)
- New Moon (Kadosh Interpretation) (2024)
- Jakarta (Day Version) (2024)
- About Love (Kadosh Remix) (2024)
- Three Chords Song (2024)
- Samurai (2024)
- Feeling (2023)
- Again and Again (2023)
- Fa Fa Fa (2023)
- Closer to Heaven (2023)
- Waiting for Me (Kadosh Remix) (2023)
- Sandcastles (2022)
- Come Around (2022)
- Free You (2021)
- Lost in the Sun (2021)
- Heliotropium (2021)
- Guruji (Kadosh Remix) (2021)
- River (2021)
- Irrit (2021)
- Majestic (2021)
- Kamala Bani (Kadosh 2020 Mix) (2020)
- Panorama (2020)
- Boom Nasty (2018)
- Druma (2018)
- Herzog (2018)
- Mind Travel (2017)
- Darkness (2016)
