= Hot Since 82 =

- Born: Daley Adam Padley; 12 September 1982 (age 44); United Kingdom
- Origin: South Yorkshire, England
- Genres: House, deep house, tech house
- Occupations: Musician, producer, disc jockey
- Instruments: Turntables, synthesizer, digital audio workstation
- Years active: 2011–present
- Labels: Get Physical, Moda Black, Knee Deep in Sound, Circus Recordings, Suara, Noir Music, Blaufield

Daley Adam Padley, also known as Hot Since 82 (born 12 September 1982), is a British house music DJ and producer from South Yorkshire, England. He has been releasing music under the Hot Since 82 moniker since 2011.

== Biography ==
=== Personal life ===
Originally from South Yorkshire, Padley entered the electronic music scene at a young age, beginning to frequent area nightclubs at the age of 14. His DJ education started at 17, playing 12–13-hour sets each Sunday at a club under his birth name. His residency soon became a top afterparty destination for clubbers in the area. As word got around, Padley's notoriety increased, resulting in a 2006 residency at Cream Ibiza in Amnesia under the banner of Leeds club Glasshouse.

=== Becoming Hot Since 82 ===
In 2010, Padley was attending an Holmfirth afterparty when the music suddenly cut out. He plugged his iPhone into the party's speakers, and incidentally, one of his works-in-progress came on. Though Padley had admittedly not made the track with the intent of releasing it, reactions at the party were roundly positive, causing him to contact his friend, Danish DJ/producer Noir, who runs the record label Noir Recordings. Noir was impressed, and released it on his label. "Let It Ride" came out on Noir Music on September 5, 2011, hitting number three on Beatport's deep house chart. Thus, Hot Since 82 was born.

=== Musical career ===
Rising out of obscurity, Daley has recently been featured in a variety of widely popular electronic music media. After a year of releasing his music, he was featured on Pete Tong's Essential Mix show on BBC Radio 1 in August 2013, playing a two-hour exclusive set.

Soon after, Daley was commissioned for a remix of electronic music pioneer Green Velvet a.k.a. Curtis Jones' song "Bigger than Prince". The track was released in September 2013, and rose to number 1 on Beatport's dance music charts.

He released his first full-length album, Little Black Book, in October 2013 on Moda Black Records, featuring collaborations with Joe T Vannelli and Thomas Gandey, as well as remixes of Rudimental and Shadow Child.

Padley launched his own imprint, Knee Deep in Sound in 2014, on which he hopes to release music from up-and-coming artists with an underground "vinyl" sound.

Electronic music website Dancing Astronaut ranked Hot Since 82 at number 7 on their list of Top 25 Techno & Deep House Producers of 2013.

In April 2014, Hot Since 82 was featured as Mixmag's cover story, with a recent mix of his featured as the magazine's "cover mix".

Padley was featured on Pete Tong's Essential Mix in July 2015; playing a full three-hour recording of his set from ENTER at Space, Ibiza.

Padley has toured in Europe and North America and has headlined many of the world's leading electronic music festivals, including Creamfields and WMC.

In 2017, Padley was nominated for Producer of the Year at the Electronic Music Awards.

On May 23, 2019, Padley announced the Even Deeper Brazil documentary that explores dance culture and more in Brazil.

== Discography ==
=== Albums ===
- 2013: Little Black Book (Moda Black)
- 2019: 8-track (Knee Deep in Sound)
- 2020: Recovery (Knee Deep in Sound)

=== Extended plays ===
- 2012: Forty Shorty (Get Physical Music)
- 2012: Hot Jams Volume 1 (Noir Music)
- 2013: Hurt You (Moda Black)
- 2013: Hot Jams Volume 2 (Noir Music)
- 2014: Planes and Trains Remixes (Suara)
- 2014: Ft. Alex Mills - Restless (Knee Deep in Sound)
- 2015: Ft. Alex Mills - The Core (Knee Deep in Sound)
- 2015: Voices (free download)
- 2015: Play the room (Saved Records)
- 2015: Leave Me/Sundown (Dubfire and Audiofly Remixes) (Moda Black)
- 2015: Veins/Damage (Truesoul)

=== Singles ===
- 2013: Hot Since 82 feat. Alex Mills - "Shadows" (Ultra Records)
- 2014: Hot Since 82 vs Joe T Vannelli feat. Csilla - The End (Moda Black)
- 2015: Hot Since 82 - "Damage" (Truesoul)
- 2016: Hot Since 82 - "Yourself" (Knee Deep in Sound)
- 2018: Hot Since 82 - "Bloodlines" (Knee Deep in Sound)
- 2020: Hot Since 82 & Rudimental - "Be Strong" (Knee Deep in Sound)
- 2025: Hot Since 82, Tomaz, Filterheadz - Sunshine 2025
- 2025: Hot Since 82 - So Real (feat. Leon Jacques)

=== DJ mixes ===
- 2019: BBC Radio 1's Essential Mix
- 2015: BBC Radio 1's Essential Mix Live from ENTER @ Space, Ibiza (3 Hour Extended Set)
- 2014: Knee Deep in Sound (Knee Deep in Sound/Ultra)
- 2014: Summer HotCast 2014
- 2014: Knee Deep in Mixmag (Mixmag)
- 2013: Knee Deep in 2013
- 2013: BBC Radio 1's Essential Mix

=== Remixes ===
- 2012: Shadow Child - "So High" (Hot Since 82 Remix)
- 2012 Sivesgaard - "In the Night" (Hot Since 82 Remix)
- 2012: Yousef - "Beg" (Hot Since 82 Future Remix)
- 2013: Thomas Schumacher - "Every Little Piece" (Hot Since 82 Remix)
- 2013: Green Velvet - "Bigger Than Prince" (Hot Since 82 Remix)
- 2013: Rudimental - "Right Here" (Hot Since 82 Remix)
- 2014: Noir & Hayze - "Angel" (Hot Since 82 Vocal Remix)
- 2016: Krankbrother - "Circular Thing" (Hot Since 82 Remix)
- 2020: Foals - "Into The Surf" (Hot Since 82 Remix)
- 2024: Kings of Tomorrow feat. April Morgan - "Fall for You" (Hot Since 82 Remix)
