= Eddie Halliwell =

British hard dance disc jockey and record producer

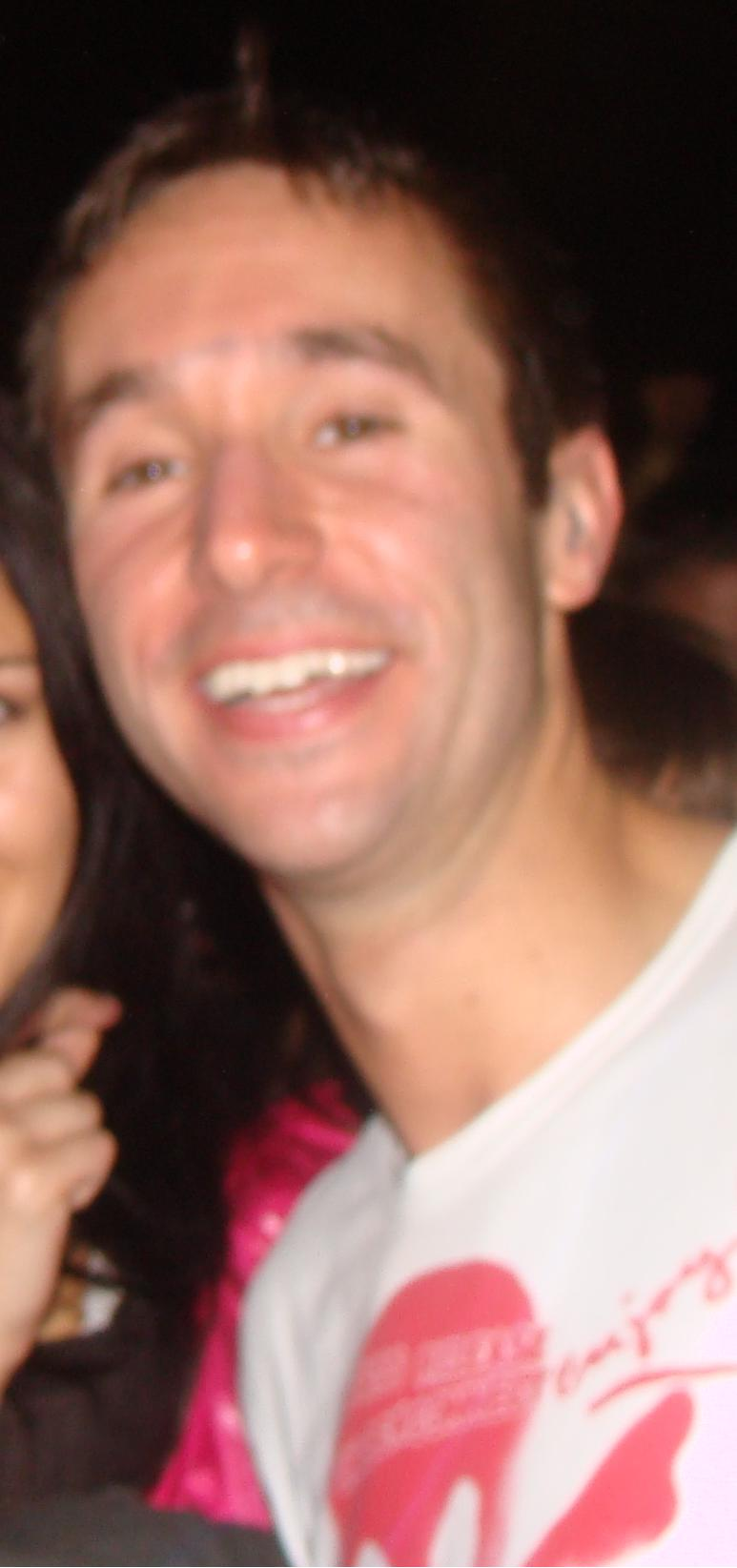

Background information
- Born: 1979 or 1980 (age 46–47)
- Origin: Wigan
- Genres: Hard house, trance
- Occupation: Disc Jockey
- Instrument: Turntable
- Website: www.eddiehalliwell.com

Eddie Halliwell (born 1979 or 1980) is an English electronic dance music disc jockey who plays techno, house and trance music. Known for his live performances he has regularly featured in the DJ Mag top 100 DJ list, and has performed several times on the BBC Radio 1 Essential Mix show.

== Career ==
Halliwell grew up in Wigan, England. He learnt the DJ trade as a "bedroom" DJ, then coming onto the scene with not only "flawless" mixing skills but also the reported scratching ability of a turntablist. His first residency in Ibiza started in 2001 at Judgement Sundays. He also went on to have a residency at Cream in the Amnesia club. Halliwell rose to prominence mainly due to his "lightning-wristed deck trickery" and an ability to make "the dance floor erupt". The crowds at his live shows are known to chant the "infamous" refrain “EDDIE! EDDIE! EDDIE!”.

In January 2002 the music magazine Mixmag featured a cover CD mixed by Halliwell. The album, Bosh!, had Halliwell's high energy and "scratchtastic" approach and featured tracks by artists such as Marco V, Signum and Tony De Vit. In 2015 Mixmag reported it had achieved the rare level of popularity sufficient to justify a sequel.

Halliwell has been featured several times in the DJ Mag annual top 100 DJ ranking, including being voted into the top 20 for 4 years running. In both 2005 and 2006 he was ranked #17, followed by #16 in 2007, and #19 in 2008. Mixmag magazine also rated him at #9 in its world top DJ poll in 2009.

Halliwell hosted regular dance music shows on BBC Radio 1 from 2005 to 2008, including co-fronting the Residency series. He has also performed DJ mixes on seven occasions for the Pete Tong Essential Mix show, including a live set from Creamfields in 2011.

In 2008 Halliwell released a mix album, Fire It Up, named after the club night he started. It was considered "too hard for some", but did showcase his talent. In 2011 he recorded the cover CD for the August issue of DJ Mag. That same year he started the record label FIUR, and also moved into production with his debut single, "Neon". This was reported as a significant move as, until this point, DJing rather than production had been his "No.1 passion". In 2012 Halliwell released the album Toolroom Knights under Mark Knight's Toolroom record label. The album charted at number 28 in the UK Dance Album chart and received positive critical reception with journalist Gregory Paratore stating "it's filled with hip-hop style cuts and scratches, showing exactly why Halliwell is able to thrill fans around the world with his quick mix style".

Halliwell hosts and presents a regular podcast and radio show called Fire It Up. The 100th anniversary of the show was celebrated in June 2011 at a live event at the Sankeys club in Manchester. As of February 2024 the show has c. 15 million listeners worldwide.

== Discography ==
Eddie Halliwell Albums
Title	Artist	Year	Peak UK Comp	Peak UK Dance
Bosh!	Various / Halliwell	2002		
Next Level Bosh!	Various / Halliwell	2003		
Cream Ibiza	Various / Halliwell	2006	34	8
Fire It Up	Various / Halliwell	2008		
Cream Ibiza	Various / Halliwell	2010	14	6
Toolroom Knights	Various / Halliwell	2012		28

== See also ==
- List of club DJs
