= Space Sharm =

Nightclub in Sharm El-Sheikh

Coordinates: 27.9203°N 34.3209°E

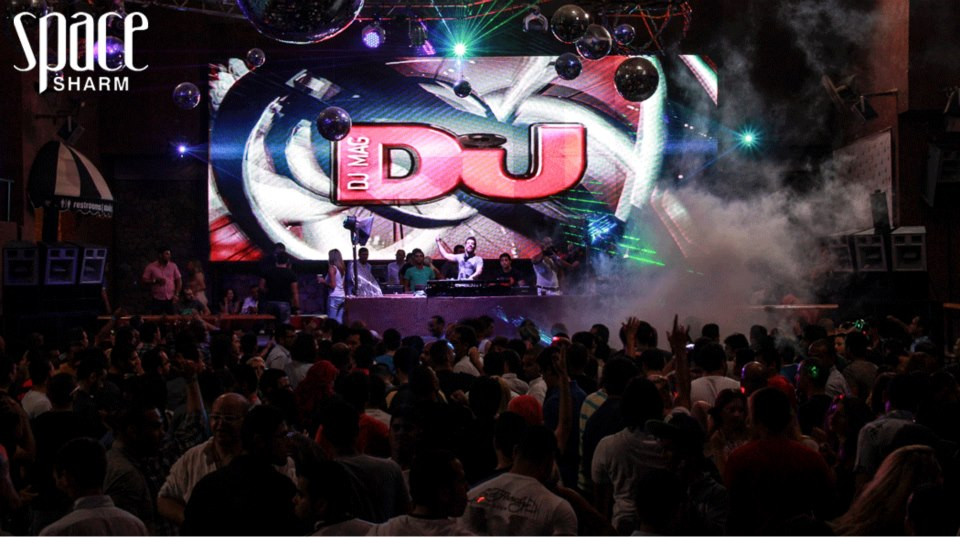
DJ Mag Top 100 Clubs tour at Space Sharm

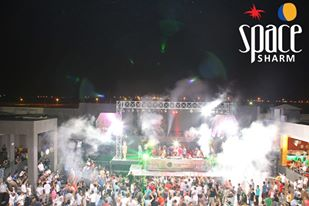
Future sound of Egypt at Space Sharm

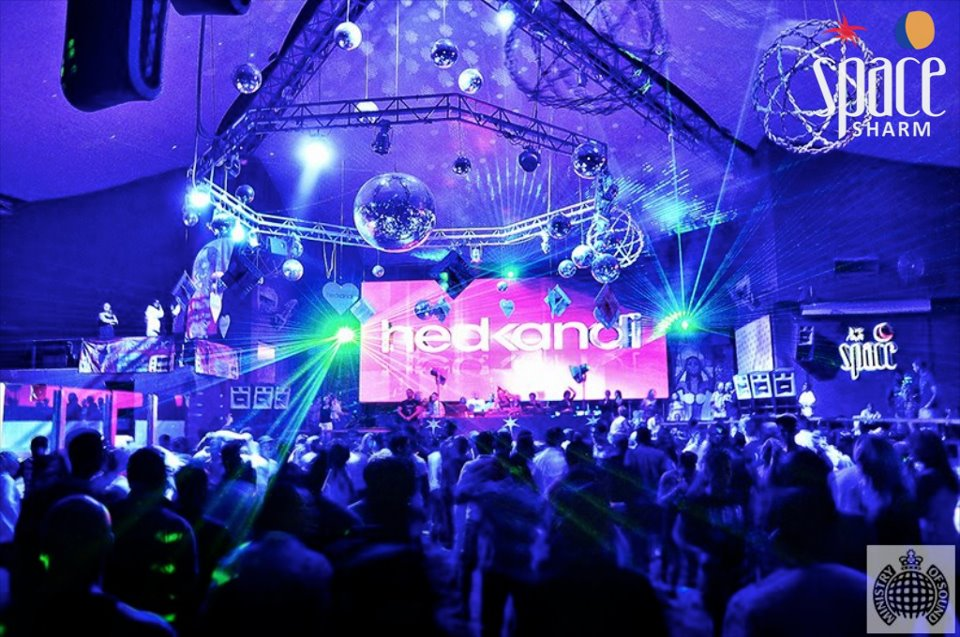
HedKandi launch party at Space Sharm

Space Sharm is a nightclub in Sharm el-Sheikh, Egypt and is an affiliate of the Ibiza nightclub with the same name - Space. The club opened in 2010 and is situated in the heart of the desert. "Space to Open Club in Sharm El Sheikh, Egypt". Ibiza Spotlight. November 4, 2010. Space Sharm placed number 41 in the DJ Mag Top 100 Clubs in 2013. Space Sharm went up 5 places in 2014 reaching #36 and is officially the number 1 club in the Middle East. In 2015, Space Sharm was voted again number 1 club in the middle east. Musically, Space Sharm is best known for specializing various styles of music not only house music. Space hosts 6 flagship nights commencing from 11pm up until 4am and is open all year round. The club hosted many international producers including Markus Schulz, Dash Berlin, Paul Van Dyk, Aly & Fila, Ferry Corsten, W&W, and many more. In 2012, Ministry of Sound Egypt held a residency at Space Sharm hosting 2 events: 'HedKandi' and 'Smoove'. The brand departed later that year. In 2011, Space collaborated with Egyptian trance duo Aly & Fila by throwing an event at Space Sharm to celebrate the 200th episode of their hugely successful radio show Future Sound of Egypt (FSOE). Space continued to hold regular FSOE events throughout the year due to its popularity in Egypt.

== Venue ==
The Venue can accommodate 9,000 to 10,000 people and is made up of 3 rooms being two of them outdoor and indoor lounge, the Terrace, El Salon and the Disco Teca. All rooms feature a sound system developed by Funktion-One. The club also has Lightning System and Laser show. The Terrace is framed within an organic style and decorated with natural elements including a 12 meter pool with a waterfall. The Discoteca has views from the red sea and the mountains.

== Flagship nights ==
Space hosts 3 club night's that cater to certain music genres such as Progressive House, Tech House, Trance, R&B, Dubstep and Drum & Bass

- Ibiza Sessions
- Urban Knights
- Escape

== See also ==
- List of electronic dance music venues
