= Elkka =

Welsh singer-songwriter (born 1988)

- Born: Emma Kirby; 1988
- Origin: Cardiff, Wales
- Years active: 2016–present
- Labels: Technicolor; femme culture
- Website: www.elkka.com

Emma Kirby (born 1988, in Cardiff), known as Elkka, is a Welsh producer, vocalist, and DJ. With a background of songwriter and vocalist for Elkka is best known for winning the Essential Mix of the Year (BBC1) in 2021. She is also known as the co-founder of femme culture, which she founded with her partner Alex Lambert, an inclusive queer platform. The label organizes the annual HeForShe compilation, and all profits go to the charity U.N. Women.

== Early life ==
Born in Cardiff, Wales, Elkka started her career as a songwriter. She grew up listening to RnB, pop stars such as Britney Spears, Spice Girls, Rihanna and wanted to become a pop vocalist. In 2016, Elkka switched from writing to producing music after being inspired by musicians such as Laurie Anderson and Imogen Heap.

== Career ==
Elkka has released music on Local Action, Ninja Tune, and her own label femme culture as well as providing remixes for Kelly Lee Owens, Hector Plimmer, and Ela Minus.

In May 2021, her extended play (EP), Euphoric Melodies, was released. It is a fusion of house and electronica genres.

In November 2021, her second EP, Harmonic Melodies, was released under the Technicolor imprint. In the same year, she received Essential Mix of the Year award. Following her award for Essential Mix of the Year 2021 for BBC Radio 1, Elkka was made BBC Radio 1 Resident in April 2022, alongside Ben UFO, Andy C, TSHA, and others.

In August 2021 Elkka won the Association of Independent Music award for Best Independent Remix for her remix of Ela Minus - Megapunk.

In November 2021 Elkka was nominated in the DJ Mag Awards for Best Breakthrough Producer.

On tour, Elkka has supported Caribou and Jon Hopkins, and she has played at significant venues and festivals including Glastonbury Festival, All Points East, and O2 Academy Brixton.

In June 2024 Elkka released her debut album, Prism of Pleasure, under Ninja Tune.

Elkka is also known for founding a record label named femme culture. The label organizes the annual HeForShe compilation with the help of UN Women.

== Discography ==
- Harmonic Melodies (2021)
- Euphoric Melodies (2021)
- Prism of Pleasure (2024)
- Xpression (2025)

== Awards and nominations ==
=== BBC Radio 1 Awards ===
Selected awards
| Year | Award | Nominated work | Category | Result |
|---|---|---|---|---|
| 2021 | BBC Radio 1 | Elkka | Essential Mix of the Year | Won |

=== Other Awards ===
- AIM Independent Remix of the Year (2021)
- Nominated Breakthrough Producer of The Year in the DJ Mag Awards (2021)
