= Josey Rebelle =

British musician

- Born: Josey Rebelle
- Origin: Tottenham, England
- Years active: 2011–present
- Website: www.joseyrebelle.com

Josey Rebelle is a British musician.

== Biography ==
Rebelle was born in Tottenham and grew up listening reggae and soul. She started DJing at the age of 13. She was educated at the London School of Economics.

Rebelle started her career with Sony Music and later worked for a drum'n'bass label, Valve Recordings.

In 2017 Umfang and Rebelle collaborated to host a radio show, the Rinse FM Show, that Rebelle has been hosting since 2011.

In 2019 Rebelle was awarded BBC The Essential Mix of the Year.

== Discography ==
- "TTT Mixtape"
- "Josey in Space"

== Awards and nominations ==
=== BBC Radio 1 Awards ===
Selected awards
Year	Award	Nominated work	Category	Result
2019	BBC Radio 1	Josey Rebelle	Essential Mix of the Year	Won
