= UNVRS =

Superclub in Ibiza

Coordinates: 38°57′28″N 1°24′29″E

[UNVRS]
- Interactive map of [UNVRS]
- Former names: Ku, Privilege
- Location: San Rafael, Ibiza, Spain
- Operator: The Night League
- Type: Superclub; Music venue
- Event: Electronic dance music

Construction
- Built: 2023
- Opened: 2025
- Renovated: 2024

Website
- Official website

[UNVRS] is a music venue and superclub, which opened on the island of Ibiza in summer 2025. The venue had previously been in the Guinness Book of World Records as the largest club in the world. It is located close to the village of Sant Rafael de Sa Creu.

In August 2024, the team behind renowned Ibiza venues Ushuaïa Ibiza and Hï Ibiza announced they would be acquiring the former Privilege nightclub near San Rafael, Ibiza. Shortly afterwards, The Night League announced the site would become [UNVRS], pronounced "Universe." Actor and musician Will Smith teased the opening of the new club in late 2024.

While the team kept information about the new venue private, they did release some snippets of key objectives. The club aimed to be the world's first superclub, a concept that aims to blend high-end luxury with the expansive scale of arena-style events. The venue is designed to revolutionize the nightlife experience by integrating technology and immersive art installations alongside the world class musicians. As media coverage around the new club grew, an online video of a UFO sighting near Es Vedrà went viral, garnering over 52 million views. The incident was revealed to be a drone stunt by entrepreneur Yann Pissenem and actor Will Smith on a followup video to promote the opening of [UNVRS] in 2025.

The site was previously home to Ku Club between 1979-1995, then Privilege Ibiza between 1995-2019. Privilege closed during the COVID-19 pandemic and never reopened.

== 2025 residencies ==
Day	Number of Dates	Event	Start date	End date
Monday	14	Eric Prydz	2 June	1 September
Tuesday	12	Anyma	8 July	26 August
Wednesday	16	Paradise	18 June	1 October
Thursday	17	Fisher	5 June	25 September
Friday	17	Galactic Circus by David Guetta	13 June	3 October
Saturday	18	Elrow	7 June	4 October
Sunday	14	Carl Cox	22 June	21 September

=== 2025 single events ===
Day	Event	Date
Friday	Opening	30 May
Sunday	ANOTR	15 June
Monday	Charlotte de Witte	22 September
Monday	Sara Landry	29 September
Sunday	Closing	12 October

== 2026 residencies ==
Day	Residency	Headliner	Dates	Events
Monday	John Summit Presents Experts Only	John Summit	01 June – 27 July 2026	9
Monday	Tiësto at [UNVRS]	Tiësto	03 August – 31 August 2026	5
Monday	Armin van Buuren Presents A State of Trance (ASOT)	Armin van Buuren	07 September – 05 October 2026	5
Tuesday	Anyma Presents ÆDEN	Anyma	09 June – 15 September 2026	15
Wednesday	Jamie Jones Presents Paradise	Jamie Jones	10 June – 07 October 2026	18
Thursday	FISHER at [UNVRS]	FISHER	04 June – 10 September 2026	15
Friday	David Guetta Presents Galactic Circus	David Guetta	19 June – 02 October 2026	16
Saturday	elrow at [UNVRS]	Elrow	06 June – 03 October 2026	18
Sunday	Carl Cox at [UNVRS]	Carl Cox	21 June – 04 October 2026	16

=== Special events ===
Event	Headliner	Dates	Events
[UNVRS] Opening Party	Black Coffee, CamelPhat, Carl Cox, Miss Monique, Paco Osuna	26 April 2026	1
ANTS at [UNVRS]	ANTS	02 May – 30 May 2026	5
Black Coffee at [UNVRS]	Black Coffee	27 May, 22 September, 01 October 2026	3
No Art at [UNVRS]	ANOTR	24 May, 29 September 2026	2
Peggy Gou Presents Midnight Lobster Club	Peggy Gou	12 June 2026	1
ANOTR at [UNVRS]	ANOTR	14 June 2026	1
Adriatique Presents X	Adriatique	17 September, 24 September 2026	2
Indira Paganotto Presents Artcore	Indira Paganotto	09 October 2026	1
Charlotte de Witte at [UNVRS]	Charlotte de Witte	29 May 2026	1

== See also ==
- List of electronic dance music venues
- Superclub
