= Corsica Studios =

Music venue, club and arts centre in London

- Interactive map of Corsica Studios
- Location: Elephant and Castle, London, England
- Coordinates: 51.49349°N 0.09877°W
- Capacity: 500
- Type: Nightclub

Construction
- Opened: 2002

Website
- corsicastudios.com

Corsica Studios was a mid-size multi-function music and arts venue located in Elephant and Castle, London.

It was founded in 2002 to provide a space for underground music events, exhibitions, performances and other creative projects and now focuses on DJ and club nights. It consists of two rooms situated within railway arches near Elephant & Castle station and is known for its stripped-back interior, intimate atmosphere and high-quality sound system.

Long-running club nights which have been based at the venue include Trance Party, Jaded, Rupture, and Low Life. Many UK and international artists have also played live at the venue, including Sunn O))) and Four Tet, Underground and experimental gig promoter Baba Yaga's Hut also has a long-term base at Corsica Studios.

== History ==
Corsica Studios was founded by Amanda Moss and Adrian Jones who started hosting events in London in 1999 in a series of short-term spaces. One of the first of these was located in Corsica Street, Highbury, which gave the project and the current venue its name.

It moved to its current location in Elephant and Castle in 2002 and was initially known as Corsica Arts Club.

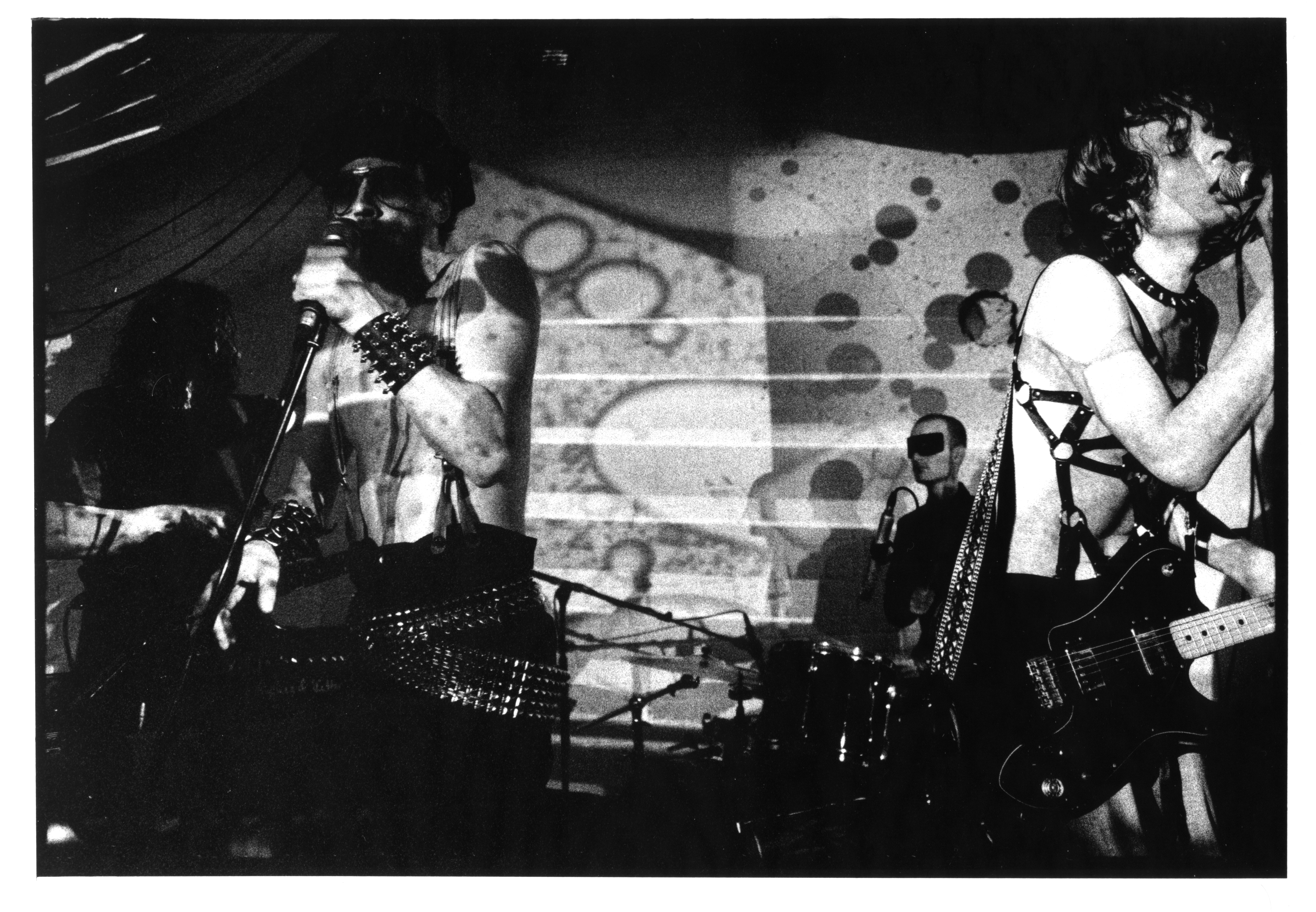
Circle live at Corsica Studios, 2009

In 2007 a new Funktion-One soundsystem was installed, a high-quality system which was rare for a smaller London club at that time, and the venue became more focused on hosting DJ and club nights. From 2010 Boiler Room used the venue as an early base, and the Hyperdub label has hosted many events there, including its tenth anniversary in 2014 and its Ø series (2017–2020) which billed label artists with guests including Björk and Laurel Halo, with installations and art pieces in the second room.

In September 2025, it was revealed that the venue in its current form would be closing in 2026.

== Awards ==
The venue won DJ Mag's Best Of British: Best Small Club of the Year award in 2009 and 2019.

It was also included in DJ Mag's Top 100 Clubs between 2010–2015 and again in 2022.

== Links ==
- Corsica Studios Homepage
