= Funktion-One =

British loudspeaker manufacturer

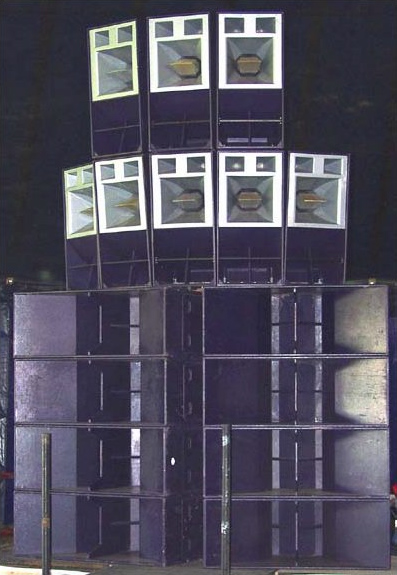
- A stack of Funktion-One loudspeakers, with bass cabinets at the bottom
- Industry: Sound reinforcement
- Founded: 1992; 34 years ago
- Founders: Tony Andrews; John Newsham
- Headquarters: Dorking, Surrey, England
- Key people: Tony Andrews (founder)
- Products: Loudspeakers, subwoofers, stage monitors
- Number of employees: 17 (2017)
- Website: funktion-one.com

Funktion-One is a British loudspeaker manufacturer based in Dorking, Surrey, England, best known for its sound systems for nightclubs and festivals. It was founded in 1992 by Tony Andrews and John Newsham, who had previously run the loudspeaker company Turbosound together. Andrews had been part of the sound crew at Glastonbury Festival in 1971, and Turbosound's systems were used by Pink Floyd and became a mainstay of outdoor raves in the late 1980s and early 1990s. After Turbosound came under the control of AKG, the pair left to start Funktion-One.

Funktion-One's first major project was the sound system for the Millennium Dome in 2000. Over the following years, its systems were installed at clubs including Space in Ibiza, Cielo in New York and Berghain in Berlin, and the brand became closely associated with dance music; promoters often named it on event flyers. Its Dance Stack, introduced in 2002, was the basis of Berghain's original main-room system, which the company replaced with a new installation in 2023. Vero, a large-format system introduced in 2016, has been used on festival stages including Glastonbury and Dekmantel.

In 2014, Resident Advisor described Funktion-One as "something like an industry standard" for club sound, and Rolling Stone named Andrews one of the 50 most important people in electronic dance music. In 2023, the writer Ed Gillett described the brand as the global standard for dance music venues.

== History ==
Funktion-One was founded in 1992 by Tony Andrews and John Newsham. (Note: The current company, Funktion One Research Limited, was incorporated in December 1998.) Andrews began building loudspeakers in the late 1960s, after leaving a university course in geology. In 1971, aged 22, he was part of the sound crew for the Pyramid Stage at Glastonbury Festival. He met the band Zorch at the Windsor Free Festival in 1974 and later designed a sound system for them, which he ran at the Stonehenge Free Festival. In the mid-1970s, he developed the Festival System, a loudspeaker set-up for large outdoor events that used separate cabinets for bass, midrange and high frequencies. In 1978, he founded Turbosound with Newsham and Tim Isaac.

At Turbosound, Andrews and Newsham designed loudspeaker systems including the TMS-3 and Flashlight. Andrews returned to Glastonbury in 1979, and in 1981 helped build the festival's permanent Pyramid Stage. Turbosound systems were used by bands including Pink Floyd, and in the late 1980s and early 1990s became a mainstay of outdoor raves, where promoters regularly advertised them on flyers as a sign of sound quality. In 1990, Turbosound provided the sound for The Wall concert in Berlin, attended by 350,000 people. After Turbosound came under the control of AKG, Andrews and Newsham left with several of its design staff to start Funktion-One. Andrews has said he started the company out of a wish to help people connect with each other.

Andrews described Funktion-One as a continuation of the approach he had taken at Turbosound, and the company's early development work started from Turbosound's Flashlight design. In its early years, Funktion-One worked as a design company: it developed the Floodlight loudspeaker and a second cabinet, both licensed to Turbosound for manufacture and used alongside the Flashlight system on Pink Floyd's 1994 Division Bell tour. The company's first major installation was the sound system for the Millennium Dome's Central Show in 2000, which was also the first use of its Resolution Series loudspeakers.

The brand became popular in electronic dance music, including among clubgoers with little interest in audio equipment. In 2012, Resident Advisor described Funktion-One as the most talked-about sound system brand in dance music, noting that promoters often named it when advertising events. It added that other manufacturers, such as Martin Audio and Void Acoustics, could achieve comparable results. In the United States, many Funktion-One installations have been carried out by Sound Investment Audio, and in late 2012 five of these appeared in Beatport's list of the ten best sound systems in America. Writing in 2013, the communication scholar Bernardo Alexander Attias described Andrews's Funktion-One designs as the most highly regarded among dance music DJs and fans, particularly for reproducing bass at high volume without the muddiness often heard in nightclubs.

In 2014, Resident Advisor called the brand "something like an industry standard". The magazine also reported that the coat check at Berghain sold T-shirts printed with images of the club's Funktion-One stacks. The same year, Rolling Stone placed Andrews 46th in its list of the 50 most important people in electronic dance music. In Party Lines (2023), a history of dance music in Britain, Ed Gillett wrote that Funktion-One had become the global industry standard in both underground and commercial dance music venues.

In 2017, the company had 17 employees, and Andrews's wife, Ann Andrews, ran its business operations. Newsham retired in 2020.

== Selected projects ==
=== Clubs ===
==== Space, Ibiza ====
Funktion-One's relationship with Space began in 2002 with an installation on the club's open-air Terrace. Funktion-One systems were later added to five of the venue's six rooms, including the 2,000-capacity main room, La Discoteca. In 2014, Space was voted the best club in the world in the DJ Mag Top 100 Clubs poll for the fourth time in seven years. The club closed in October 2016 after 27 years. For its final party, Funktion-One supplied a Vero system for an outdoor area holding about 7,000 people.

==== New York ====
Cielo, in the Meatpacking District of Manhattan, opened in 2003 and was Funktion-One's first installation in the United States. Its main-room system combined AX88 loudspeakers with the company's Infrabass enclosures. In late 2012, Beatport ranked Cielo first in its list of the ten best club sound systems in the United States. The club closed at the end of 2018. Output, a club in Williamsburg, Brooklyn, opened in 2013 with a Funktion-One system installed by Sound Investment Audio; Resident Advisor reported that Funktion-One had made the club a showroom for its newest technology, including loudspeakers that had not yet been released. Output closed on 1 January 2019.

Basement, a techno club beneath the Knockdown Center in Queens, opened in May 2019 with a Funktion-One surround sound system. In 2022, the club opened a second, smaller room, Studio, with its own Funktion-One system.

==== Berghain, Berlin ====
When it was installed at Berghain in 2005, the system was one of Funktion-One's largest and its first in Berlin. The main room, which has an 18-metre (59 ft) ceiling, was fitted with four Dance Stacks and a Double Infrahorn bass enclosure. The installation was carried out by the German firm Totalton, and Andrews travelled to Berlin to tune it. According to Benedikt Koch, who worked on the installation, the system usually ran at 10 to 20 per cent of its capacity. It remained in use for 18 years, averaging about 40 hours a week, and Mixmag described it as "legendary for its power".

In 2023, the main-room system was replaced with a new Funktion-One installation, whose specification was not made public. Funktion-One DJ monitors are used in the club's upstairs room, Panorama Bar.

==== London ====
Corsica Studios, a club beneath two railway arches in Elephant and Castle, had a four-point Funktion-One system in each of its two rooms. New loudspeakers were installed in the main room in 2018. The club closed in its original form in March 2026. At Printworks, a larger venue in a former printing plant, Funktion-One Infrabass enclosures were used for events staged by the promoter The Hydra, and the venue was still using a Funktion-One system in 2022, shortly before it closed for redevelopment. Fold, a techno club above a print factory on an industrial estate in Canning Town, opened in 2018 with a 110-decibel Funktion-One system.

==== Open Ground, Wuppertal ====
Open Ground, a club in a converted bunker in Wuppertal, Germany, opened in December 2023 with a Funktion-One system using 32-inch bass enclosures. Funktion-One worked on the sound design from the early stages of the club's development, and both of its rooms were acoustically treated to simulate open-air conditions. In 2026, the club was included in DJ Mag's Top 100 Clubs poll.

=== Festivals ===
==== Glastonbury Festival ====
In 1992, Andrews designed and installed the sound system for the Experimental Soundfield, Glastonbury's first official space for electronic dance music, with a 360-degree surround sound system and a quadraphonic mixing desk that had been used on Pink Floyd's 1970s stadium tours. Underworld and Orbital were among the acts who performed there over the weekend. The area's success led to the festival's first official dance tent in 1995. In 2019, The Glade, one of the festival's dance stages, became the first stage at Glastonbury to use the company's Vero system, and by 2025 Funktion-One had been supplying it for 15 years.

==== Dekmantel and Amsterdam Dance Event ====
Dekmantel, a house and techno festival held in the Amsterdamse Bos since 2013, has used Funktion-One systems on several of its stages since 2014. Reviewing the 2015 edition, Crack described the systems as "monolithic" and noted that they were not restricted by volume limits. By 2016, the Dutch hire company Think! AV was supplying Funktion-One systems for all six of the festival's areas, and in 2018 a Vero system was used on the UFO stage. In 2026, the festival's lead scenographer, Albert van Abbe, said Funktion-One had "always been a go-to" for Dekmantel, although the festival had also begun using other sound systems.

Think! AV supplied events during the Amsterdam Dance Event. In 2019 it provided more than 560 Funktion-One loudspeakers to events across the city, including DGTL, Dockyard and Mystic Garden festivals.

==== Ultra Music Festival and Resistance ====
At the 2016 Ultra Music Festival in Miami, eight of Funktion-One's new F132 subwoofers were used in the Carl Cox and Friends Arena. In 2018, a Vero system was used for the nine-week residency of Resistance, Ultra's techno brand, at Privilege in Ibiza. In 2022, Funktion-One supplied a system built around Vero for Carl Cox's 12,000-capacity Resistance MegaStructure arena in Miami.

=== Other projects ===
The company has supplied sports venues, including Allianz Park in London. In Russia, its systems were installed at the Bolshoy Ice Dome and Sanki Sliding Center, venues of the 2014 Winter Olympics, and at the Volgograd Arena, built for the 2018 FIFA World Cup. Funktion-One loudspeakers have also been used in art installations such as Cevdet Erek's Bergama Stereo (2019), a half-scale reconstruction of the Pergamon Altar built around 34 Funktion-One loudspeakers and shown at the Hamburger Bahnhof in Berlin.

== Products and manufacturing ==
Funktion-One designs and builds its loudspeakers in England, at a workshop at Beare Green, near Dorking. Amplifiers and other electronics are made by partner manufacturers. Its systems are mostly horn-loaded, and are recognisable by their purple cabinets and silver "Axehead" waveguides.

The company's first range, the Resolution Series, was introduced in 2000 and used at the Millennium Dome. It was followed in 2002 by the Dance Stack, a club system originally designed for the Maze nightclub in Miami, which later formed the basis of Berghain's main-room system. In 2015, Funktion-One introduced the Evolution (Evo) Series, which it later extended with the wide-dispersion Evo X in 2022 and the Evo 2, a development of the Resolution 2, in 2024.

For touring and festivals, the company released Vero, a large-format system, in 2016, and the smaller Vero VX in 2019. Also in 2016, it added the F132, a subwoofer with a single 32-inch driver developed with the amplifier maker Powersoft. In 2023, the company released a new generation of its Compact Range, small loudspeakers and self-powered bass units developed during the COVID-19 lockdowns.
