= Fold (nightclub) =

Nightclub and arts venue in London

FOLD
- Interactive map of FOLD
- Location: Gillian House, Stephenson Street; Canning Town, London, E16 4SA
- Coordinates: 51.5190°N 0.0038°E
- Capacity: 600
- Type: Nightclub, arts venue
- Events: Techno, rave

Construction
- Opened: August 18, 2018

Website
- www.fold.london

Fold (stylised as FOLD) is a nightclub and multi-disciplinary arts venue on Stephenson Street in Canning Town, London. Opened in 2018, it operates with a 24-hour license and is known for its focus on underground techno music, its inclusive ethos, and a design that prioritizes the communal experience of its patrons.

== History ==
Fold was founded by Seb Glover, formerly of the Hackney Wick venue Shapes, and DJ-producer Lasha Jorjoliani. They selected a former print works on an industrial estate, intentionally choosing a location distant from residential areas to secure a 24-hour license from the London Borough of Newham. The venue has an unassuming exterior that blends in with its industrial surroundings. It officially opened on 18 August 2018 with a 24-hour event.

In November 2019, the club's license was briefly suspended by the council but was reinstated later that month following a hearing.

== Design and Ethos ==
Fold was established with an "artist-led" ethos, aiming to create a community space and cultural hub. Its interior design is minimalist and industrial, featuring a dark, stripped-back dancefloor. The DJ booth is positioned at floor level, while the only elevated platforms are steel scaffolding structures for dancers. This design choice intentionally shifts focus from the DJ to the crowd, fostering a more communal atmosphere.

The venue has a strict no-photography policy to encourage patrons to be present and to create a safer, more uninhibited environment. It is noted for its inclusive, queer-positive safe space policy, which is displayed at its entrance. Other design features include the use of lockers instead of a cloakroom for personal freedom and a policy of never exceeding a capacity that allows for comfortable personal space on the dancefloor.

== Music and Culture ==
The club specializes in techno and rave music, with a booking policy that often favors challenging or emerging artists over established headliners. The main room is equipped with a Funktion-One sound system, and the venue's industrial construction provides natural soundproofing.

One of Fold's signature events is UNFOLD, a Sunday daytime party which often features unannounced line-ups of local artists. During this event, the DJ decks are moved to the centre of the dancefloor to "democratise the relationship between the artists and the audience". The venue also hosts FUTUR.SHOCK, a multi-disciplinary arts programme involving visual art, experimental music, and talks.
