= Platja d'en Bossa =

Holiday resort in Ibiza, Spain

- Beach
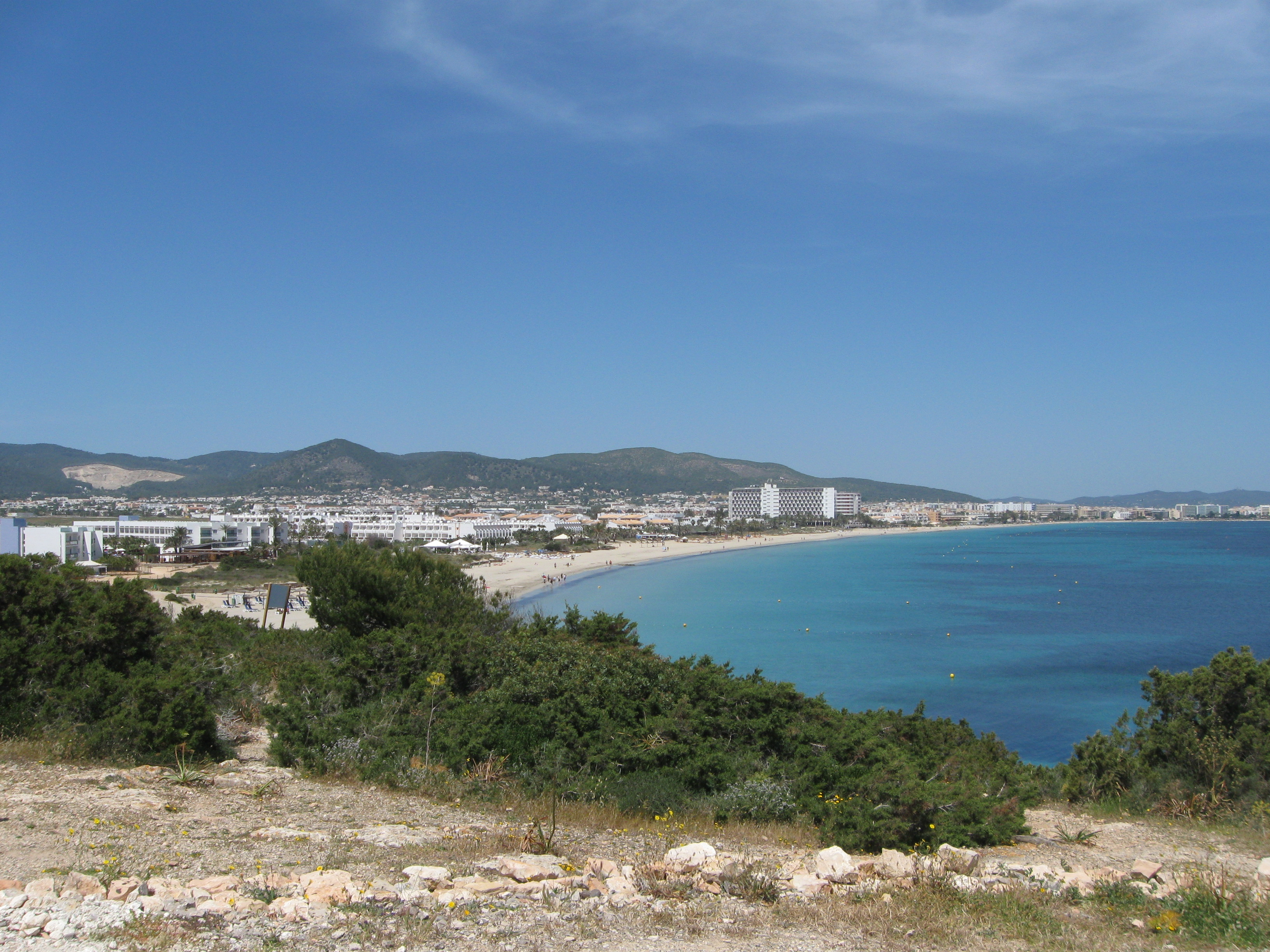
- Platja d'en Bossa beach looking North towards Ibiza Town

- Location within Ibiza
- Coordinates: 38°53′10″N 1°24′24″E
- Location: Sant Joan de Labritja, Ibiza, Spain

Platja d'en Bossa (Catalan pronunciation: [ˈpladʒə ðəm ˈbosə]; Spanish: Playa d'en Bossa) is a major holiday resort on the Spanish island of Ibiza primarily catering for the British, German and Italian package holiday market. It is situated in the municipality of Sant Josep de sa Talaia, approximately 3 kilometres (1.9 mi) to the South of Ibiza Town. The island's main airport is approximately 3.2 kilometres (2.0 mi) away from Platja d'en Bossa.

== Description ==
At 2.7 kilometres (1.7 mi) long, the resort has the longest beaches on the island and is characterised by large hotel complex, restaurants, retail stores and residential property. There are both low and high rise buildings. In the summer months the area is one of the busiest resorts on the island.

== Clubbing ==
Platja d'en Bossa is a popular resort for its many bars and nightclubs. One of the island's so called super-clubs called Space was located in the resort until its closure in 2016. This club occupied what was once the islands conference and exhibition centre which failed and was sold. In 1987 it was sold and was opened as a nightclub. In the early 1990s DJs in the club began to carry on their sessions out in the open air terrace next to the club, and so began the legendary after hours parties which feature today. Over the years many world famous DJs have appeared in the club including Carl Cox, Paul Oakenfold, Sasha, Erick Morillo, Groove Armada, Danny Tenaglia and Robbie Rivera. In recent years another venue within the resort has become a popular place for music and events. It is called Ushuaïa and has held events for BBC Radio 1 in Ibiza. Sankeys is also located in Playa d'en Bossa.
