= Eats Everything =

English DJ (born 1980)

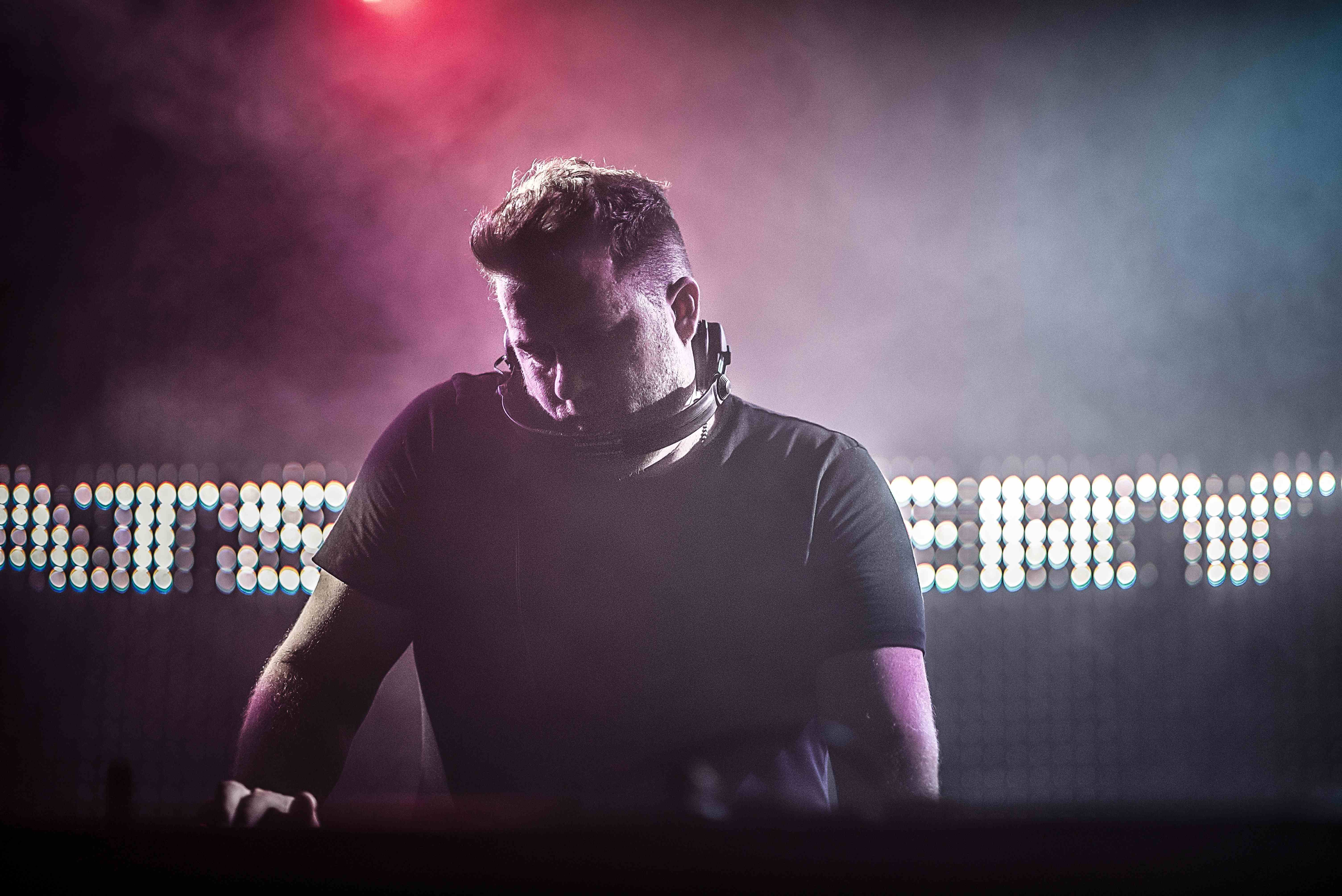

Background information
- Also known as: The EEL; Catz Eats Dogz; Coats in Arms; Pat Butcher in drag; The Salad Dodger
- Born: Daniel Pearce; 12 May 1980 (age 46); Bristol, England
- Genres: House; bass; tech-house; UK garage
- Occupations: DJ; record producer
- Years active: 2000–present
- Labels: Pets; Futureboogie; Hypercolour; EdibleBeats

Daniel Pearce, better known as Eats Everything, is an English DJ and record producer. He came to prominence in 2011 with the release of "Entrance Song" on Pets Recordings. Since then, he has received critical acclaim for a number of solo releases on Dirtybird, Hypercolour and Futureboogie.

His productions combine house music with UK bass, garage, techno and jungle.

== Musical career ==
=== Early career ===
Pearce began his DJ career at Infamous/Heresy at club Loco Bristol, and was soon permanently placed as a resident for the Bristol night Ripsnorter and Scream in the early 2000s, as well as playing some gigs in Europe. 2010 saw early releases and remixes on independent labels including Venga Digital and Wearhouse Music.

=== As a DJ ===
Since 2011, he has played at Fabric, DC10, Amnesia, The Warehouse Project and Space, as well as festivals such Glastonbury, Bestival, Creamfields and Secret Garden Party.

In 2014, he played a three-month residency at XOYO in London. In 2012 he won 'Best British DJ' in the DJ Magazine 'Best of British Awards'. In addition to this, in December 2012 he was the highest new entry in Resident Advisor's prestigious Top 100 DJs Poll, coming in at number 13. In 2012, he won Best British DJ at the DJ Magazine Best of British Awards.

=== As a producer ===
Pearce has had a string of releases on Pets Recordings, Dirtybird, Hypercolour, Futureboogie and Crosstown Rebels. He has also released remixes for Adam F, Jamie Jones, Totally Enormous Extinct Dinosaurs, Chicken Lips, X-Press 2, The Streets and Four Tet.

He has collaborated in the studio with Catz 'n Dogz under the name Catz Eats Dogz, Totally Enormous Extinct Dinosaurs, Justin Martin, Skream and Lukas as well as the singer/songwriter Sinead Harnett.

In 2011, Pearce was awarded 'Best Breakthrough Producer' in DJ Magazine's 'Best of British Award'. At Disclosure's Alexandra Palace set in early December 2015, Eats Everything provided the opening act.

== Discography ==
=== Extended plays ===
- 2011: Entrance Song [Pets]
- 2011: Eats Everything [Dirtybird]
- 2012: Vertigo / Trubble [Dirtybird]
- 2012: Jagged Elbow [Pets]
- 2012: Slow for Me [Futureboogie]
- 2013: Early Bites [Southern Fried Records]
- 2014: Reworks [Pets]

=== Singles ===
==== As solo artist ====
- 2020: "Honey" [FFRR] (samples Moi Renée's "Miss Honey")

==== Collaborations ====
- 2011: Worthy and Eats Everything - "Tric Trac" [Dirtybird]
- 2012: Idiotproof and Eats Everything - African Love EP [Jackmode Music]
- 2013: Teed and Eats Everything - "Lion, the Lion" [Crosstown Rebels]
- 2013: Justin Martin and Eats Everything - "Feather Flight" [Hypercolour]
- 2013: Justin Martin and Eats Everything - "The Gettup" [Dirtybird]
- 2013: Catz Eats Dogz - Stinky Lollipop EP [Pets]
- 2015: Eats Everything featuring Tiga and Audion - "Dancing (Again!)" [Method White]
- 2016: Big Discs EP [Pets]
- 2020: Fatboy Slim and Eats Everything - "All the Ladies" [Southern Fried Records]
- 2024: Eats Everything featuring Stevie Appleton - "Happy People" [Three Six Zero Recordings]

=== DJ mixes ===
- RA.316 [Resident Advisor]
- Fabric 86 [Fabric (London)]
