= Sankeys =

Nightclub franchise

- Interactive map of Sankeys
- Former names: Sankeys Soap
- Location: Ancoats, Manchester, UK (1994-2013; 2014-2017); Playa d’en Bossa, Ibiza, Spain (2011-2018); Manhattan, New York, USA (2013-2013); Tokyo, Japan (2015)
- Owner: David Vincent
- Capacity: 1200
- Type: Nightclub

Construction
- Opened: June 1994

Website
- sankeys.info

Sankeys is a nightclub franchise with its first nightclub in Ancoats, Manchester, United Kingdom. The company formerly operated a nightclub in Playa d’en Bossa, Ibiza and opened a New York City venue in 2013.

== Sankeys Manchester ==
Sankeys first opened in Manchester as "Sankeys Soap" in June 1994 by Andy Spiro and Rupert Campbell.

In 2000, the club was revived by business partners David Vincent and Sacha Lord. This time the club was more successful than before, tackling the problems that had crippled its previous owners. In 2006, the club was forced to close once more, much to the dismay of clubbers. David Vincent announced that this time Sankeys Soap would be closed for good.

In 2009, owing to the success of the new club, 15 further changes were made to celebrate 15 years of the Sankeys dynasty. These included dynamic ceiling lighting in the Spektrum (the upstairs part of the club) as well as a beach constructed with 50 tonnes of Bahamas Sand and the introduction of a state-of-the-art barcoded entry system. In 2010, Sankeys was voted the number one club in the world in a DJ Mag reader poll.

Following the success of 2010, David Vincent announced plans to create "Seven Sankeys" of the World in the seven cities that inspired the original Sankeys.

The music policy at Sankeys was varied but focused on underground electronic music, mainly House & Techno. The club also hosted one-off nights from outside promoters.

On 11 April 2013, Sankeys announced they would be closing their doors again on 6 May 2013.

On 12 November 2013, Sankeys announced on their Ibiza Twitter feed that they would be re-opening Manchester in January 2014.

On 12 January 2017, Sankeys announced that they were permanently closing with immediate effect, after the building they occupied had been sold to be turned into apartments.

In November 2025, it was announced that Sankeys would return in 2026 with a new venue in central Manchester. The relaunch forms part of a wider revival of the brand led by David Vincent, with the new club set to operate under a strict no mobile phones policy intended to refocus attention on the dancefloor experience. David and his new partners William 'wilf' Gregory and Jason Jennings are looking to re-create the magic of the old Sankeys and bring its atmosphere and energy to a new generation of younger clubbers and DJ's

== Awards and nominations ==
=== DJ Magazine's top 100 Clubs ===
Year	Work	Position	Ref.
2007	Sankeys MCR	38	
2008	Sankeys MCR	17	
2009	Sankeys MCR	16	
2010	Sankeys MCR	1	
2011	Sankeys MCR	7	
2012	Sankeys MCR	22	
2013	Sankeys MCR	57	
Year	Work	Position	Ref.
2013	Sankeys Ibiza	80	
2014	Sankeys Ibiza	28	
2015	Sankeys Ibiza	31	
2016	Sankeys Ibiza	27	
2017	Sankeys Ibiza	77	
2018	Sankeys Ibiza	69	

=== International Nightlife Association's Top 100 Clubs ===
Year	Work	Position	Ref.
2015 (Note: 2005 saw the debut of the chart.)	Sankeys Ibiza	25	
2016	Sankeys Ibiza	26	
2017	Sankeys Ibiza	16	

== See also ==
- List of electronic dance music venues
