= Space (Ibiza nightclub) =

Nightclub in Ibiza, Spain

- (/ˈspeɪs/, Spanish: [esˈpejs], Catalan: [əsˈpejs])
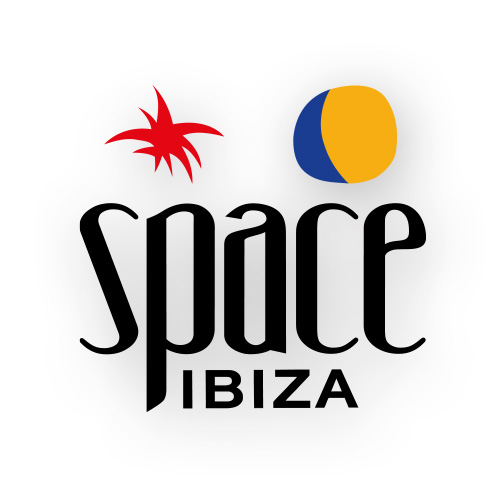
- Interactive map of Space
- Location: Platja d'en Bossa, Sant Josep de sa Talaia, Ibiza, Spain
- Coordinates: 38°53′10″N 1°24′11″E
- Owner: Pepe Rosello
- Capacity: 5000
- Type: Nightclub, music venue
- Events: Dance music, live music, performance art
- Record attendance: 5000

Construction
- Opened: 1986
- Closed: 2016

Space (/ˈspeɪs/, Spanish: [esˈpejs], Catalan: [əsˈpejs]) was a superclub on the island of Ibiza, Spain from 1986 to 2016, owned by STANCA. In 2022 the brand opened a bar near Cafe Mambo. The brand has occasionally run popup events around the world, but does not have a fixed club as of 2023.

It was awarded "Best Global Club" at the International Dance Music Awards in 2005, 2006, 2012, 2013, and 2014. Space was located in Platja d'en Bossa on the outskirts of Ibiza Town, close to the airport. In 2017, Hï Ibiza opened in Space Ibiza's original location. Space Ibiza announced in 2021 that it would reopen its doors in 2022. This resulted in the new Space Bar near Cafe Mambo, though the club night is yet to return to Ibiza, however the club has since opened at a new location in Riccione, Italy.

== History ==
Space first opened in early summer of 1986. The opening night featured the opening of the water park Aguamar located behind the club, party-goers being able to take advantage of the waterslides at night.

Space in its current form began in 1989 when Pepe Rosello, Ibiza nightclub owner since 1963, took over the establishment, which in the four years since it was built had housed a conference hall with a discothèque. The opening policy agreed with Spanish licensing laws, which state that an establishment must close for at least two hours a day.

Following the closure of three of Ibiza's clubs at the start of the 2007 season, local authorities have hinted at plans to alter the licensing regulations that allow clubs to open for 22 hours per day. Suggestions at present would allow for clubs to open at noon. Clubs may not open before 8 a.m.

Space, DC10 and Bora-Bora in Sant Josep allows after-hours parties.

The first DJs to shape the venue into its current shape were Alex P and Brandon Block, two British club DJs/producers and residents of Sunday Space Terrace — Space's outdoor terrace, where airliners roar overhead. This open terrace and the roaring sound of the airliners breaking through the booming dance music has become one of the club's defining features. Since Amnesia and Privilege have had to encase their open-air dance floors due to noise complaints from their neighbours, Space remains one of the few venues where club-goers can have this experience, and the crowd's greeting of the arriving aircraft has also become a ritual among the club's patrons.

Other resident DJs/producers responsible for the club's popularity include Reche, Jose de Divina, Jon Ulysses and Monkey.

Carl Cox was most associated with the club for nearly 15 years, thanks to his "Music is Revolution" night. When Pepe Rosello stepped down from the club, Cox decided to move on, playing a nine-hour final set in September 2016. Space released compilations every year via the former Azuli label and now with CR2 Records.

=== Post closure ===
Since the club closed in 2016, it has since been bought by Ushuaïa Entertainment and was reopened in 2017 under the name Hï Ibiza.

== Notable events ==
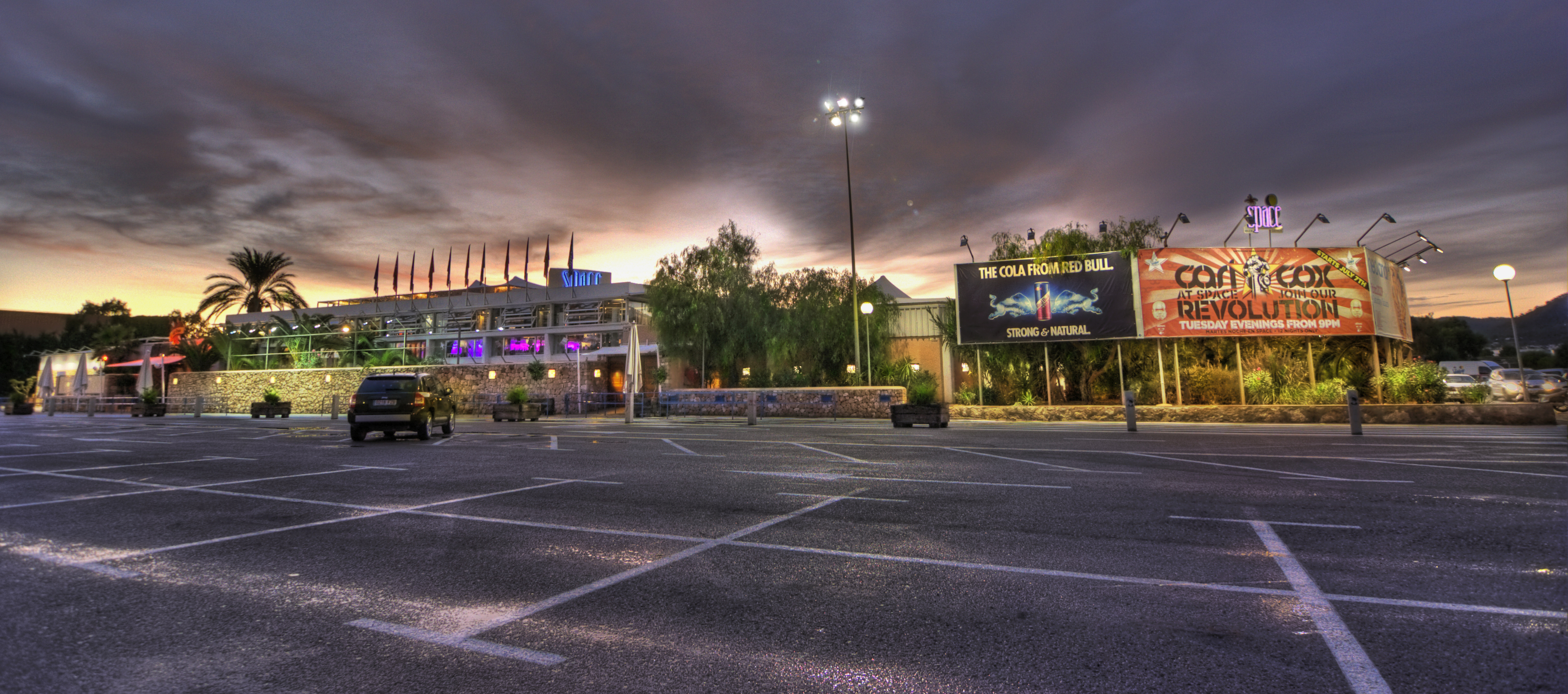
Advertisement for Carl Cox's "Music is Revolution" night

=== "We Love Sundays" ===
Space's Flagship Sunday sessions began in 1999. We Love... Space is a weekly party which opens at 4:30 p.m. on Sunday and keeps going until 6:00 a.m. Monday morning. The event runs for 16 weeks throughout the summer season.

== Notable DJs ==
Martin Garrix, Black Coffee, Armin van Buuren, David Guetta, Sven Väth, Nicolas Jaar, Josh Wink, Carl Cox, DJ Koze, Dr. Motte, Michel v. Tell, Dj Hell, Dixon, Tom Novy, Nicole Moudaber, Groove Armada, David Morales, Daniel Avery, Joseph Capriati, Danny Tenaglia, Julio Bashmore, Maceo Plex, Claude VonStroke, Carl Craig, Tiga, Fatboy Slim, Eats Everything, Seth Troxler, Green Velvet, Yousef, Joris Voorn, Steve Bug, Marcel Dettmann.

== Affiliated clubs ==
In 2010 Space opened an affiliate club in Sharm El Sheikh, Egypt named Space Sharm. Two years later, on 29 December 2012, Space opened another affiliate club in Balneário Camboriú, Santa Catarina, Brazil, named Space B. Camboriú.

== Awards and nominations ==
=== DJ Awards ===
Year	Category	Work	Outcome	Ref.
2015	Special Award - Most Iconic Club	Space - Ibiza	Won	

=== DJ Magazine's top 100 Clubs ===
Year	Position	Notes	Ref.
2006	?	New Entry	
2007	1	—N/a	
2008	2	—N/a	
2009	3	—N/a	
2010	7	—N/a	
2011	1	—N/a	
2012	1	—N/a	
2013	2	—N/a	
2014	1	—N/a	
2015	2	—N/a	
2016	1	—N/a	
2017	1	—N/a	

=== International Dance Music Awards ===
Year	Category	Work	Outcome	Ref.
2005 (Note: Category Debut)	Best Global Club	Space - Ibiza Spain	Won	
2006	Best Global Club	Space - Ibiza Spain	Won	
2007	Best Global Club	Space - Ibiza Spain	Nominated	
2008	Best Global Club	Space - Ibiza Spain	Nominated	
2009	Best Global Club	Space - Ibiza Spain	Nominated	
2010	Best Global Club	Space - Ibiza Spain	Nominated	
2011	Best Global Club	Space - Ibiza Spain	Nominated	
2012	Best Global Club	Space - Ibiza Spain	Won	
2013	Best Global Club	Space - Ibiza Spain	Won	
2014	Best Global Club	Space - Ibiza Spain	Won	
2015	Best Global Club	Space - Ibiza Spain	Nominated	
2016	Best Global Club	Space - Ibiza Spain	Nominated	

=== International Nightlife Association's Top 100 Clubs ===
Year	Position	Notes	Ref.
2015 (Note: 2005 saw the debut of the chart.)	11	New Entry	
2016	5	—N/a	

== Gallery ==
Space Nightclub Ibiza

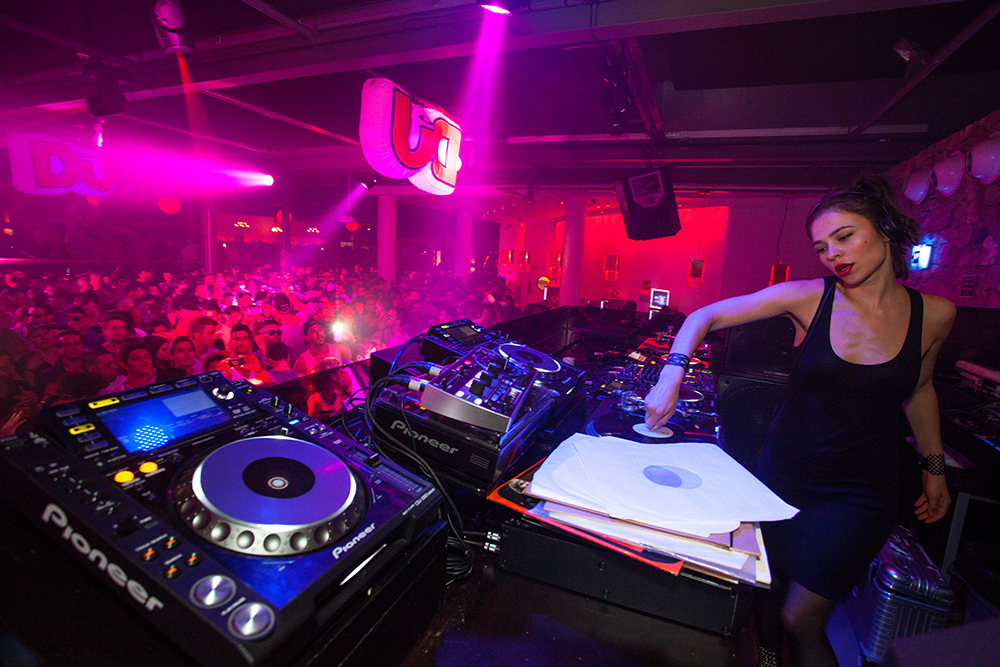

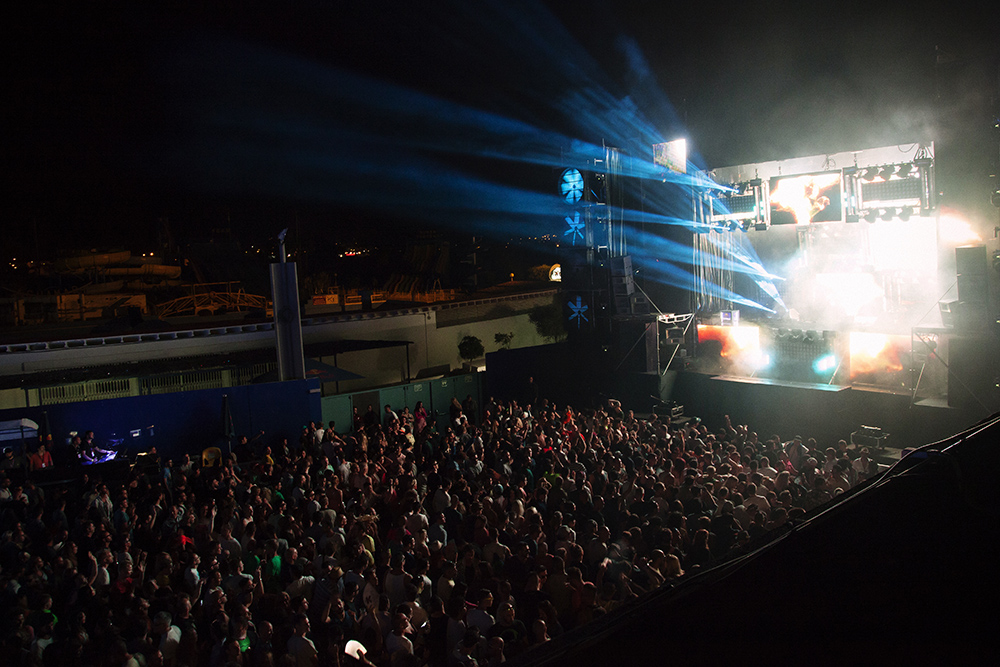

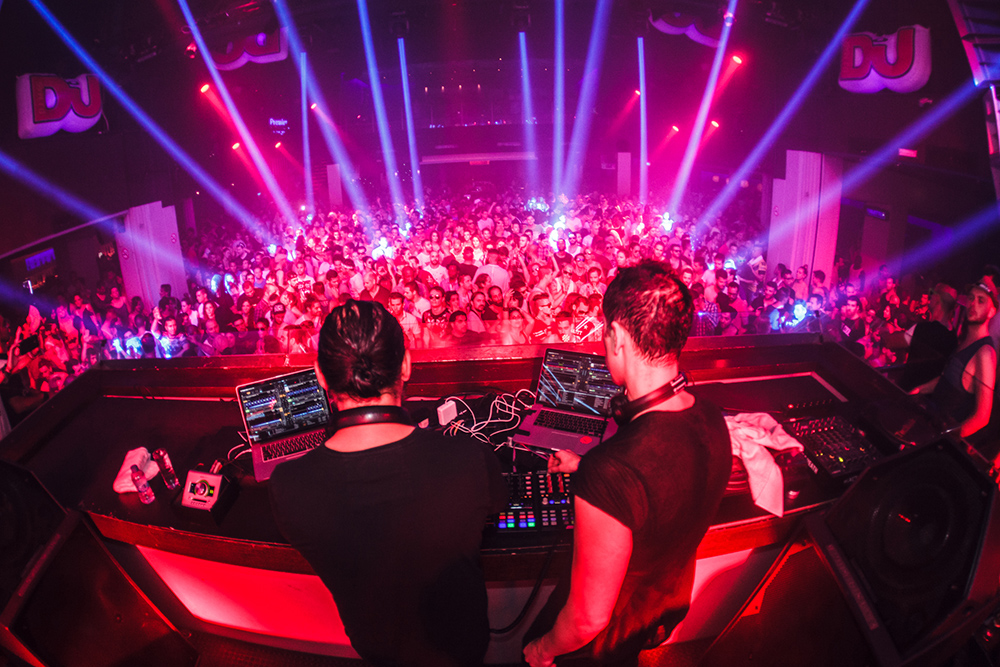

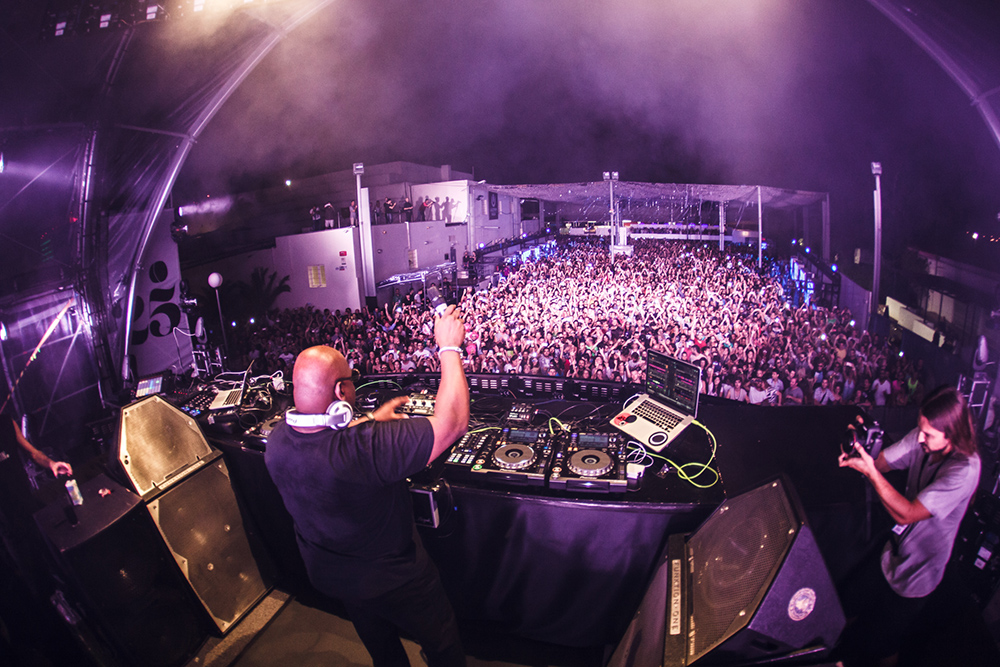

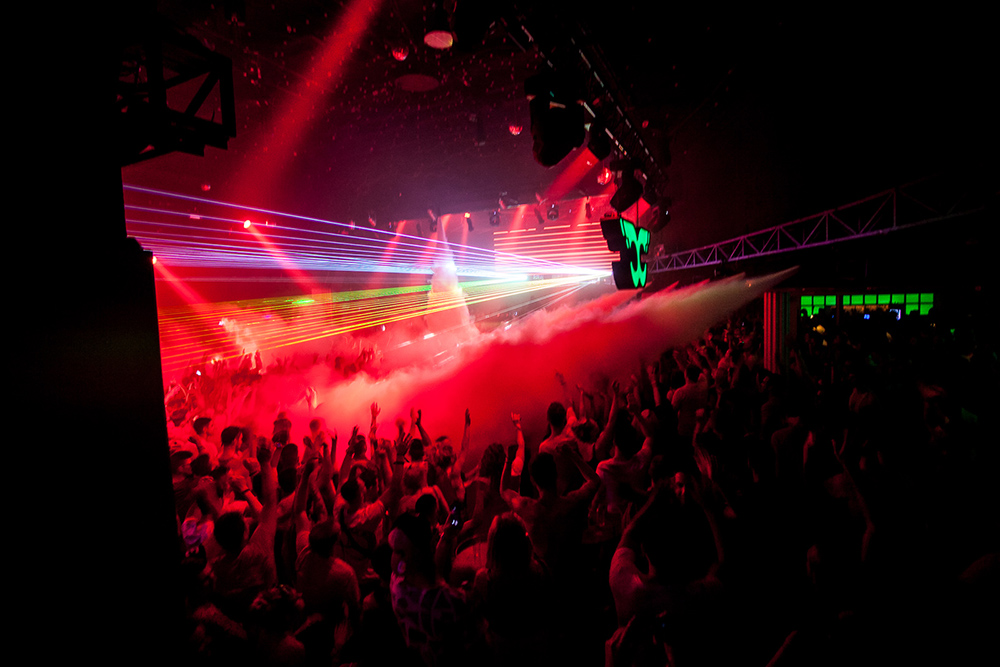

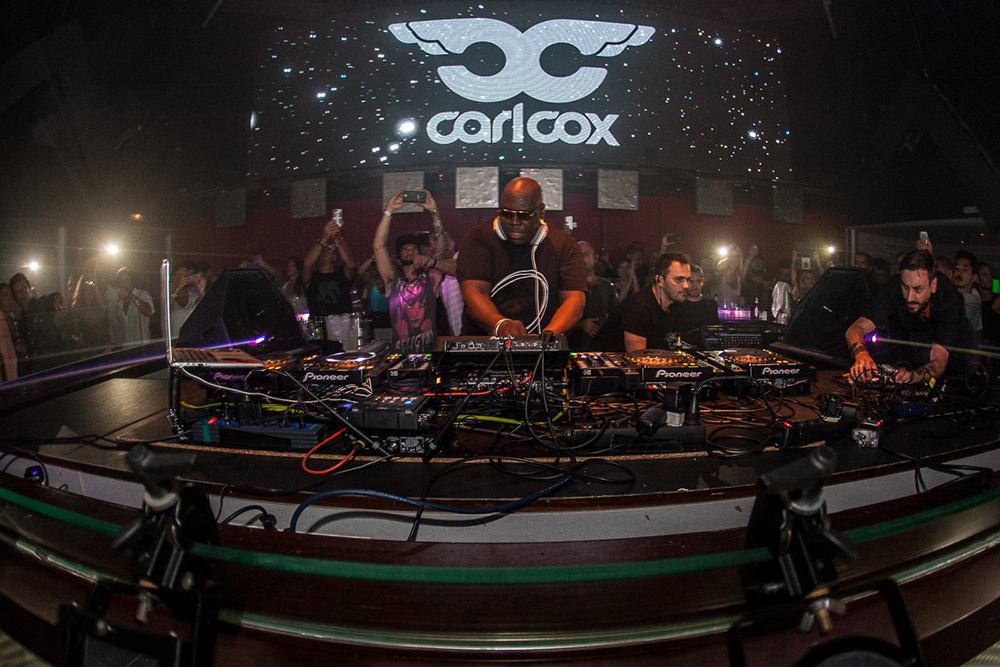

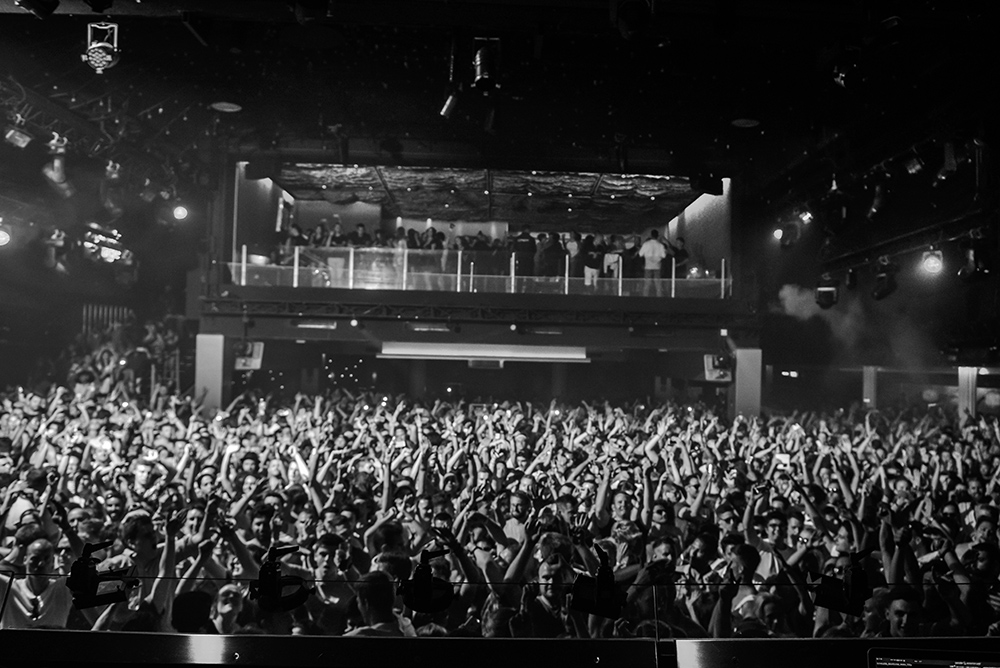

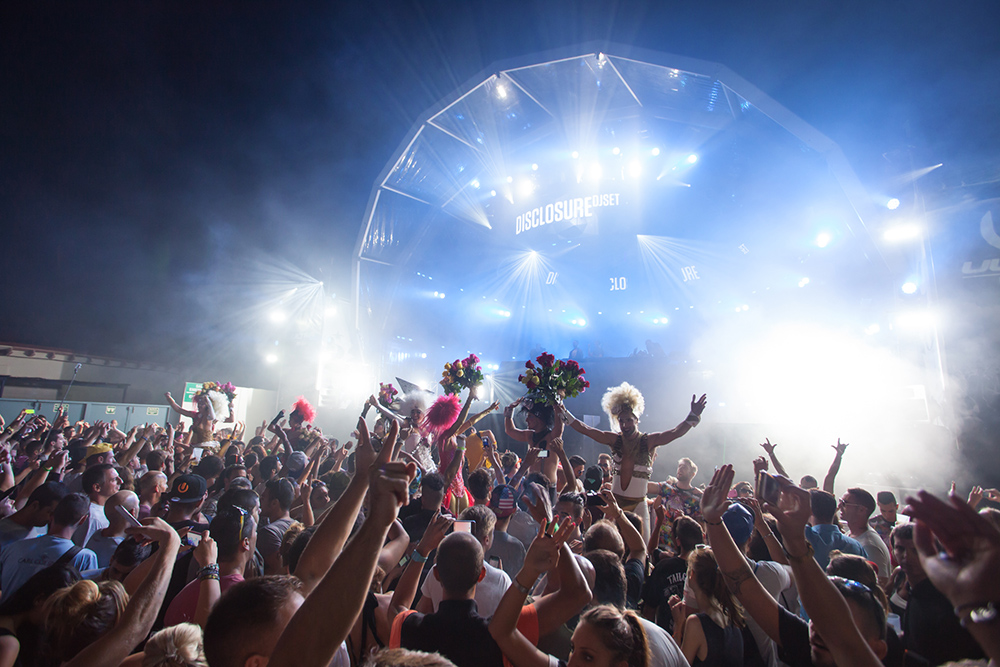

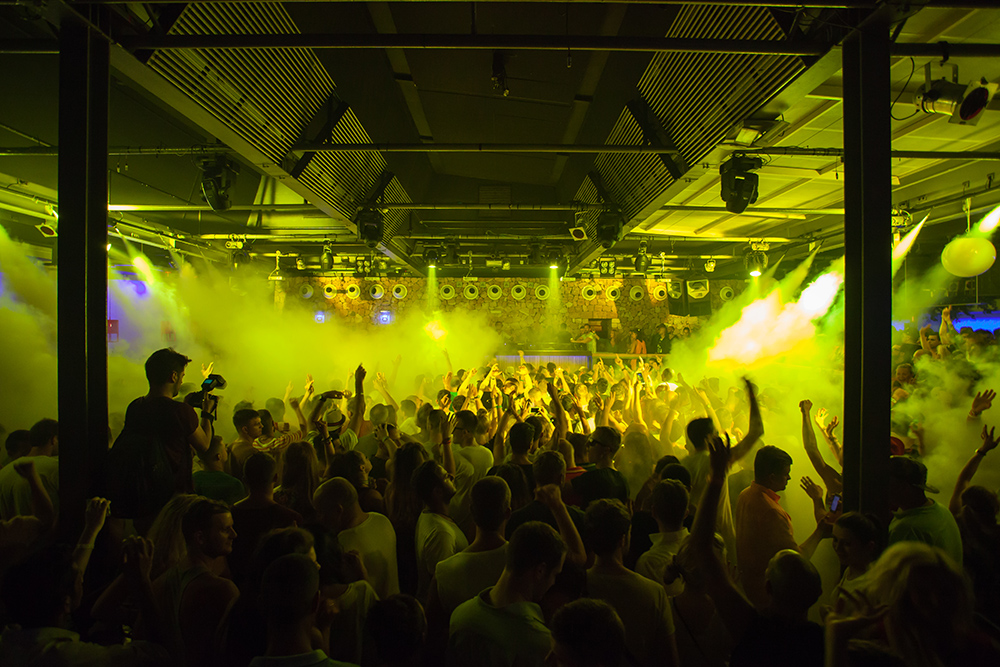

== See also ==
- List of electronic dance music venues
- Superclub
