= Ushuaïa Ibiza =

Hotel on the island of Ibiza, Spain

Ushuaïa Ibiza Beach Hotel
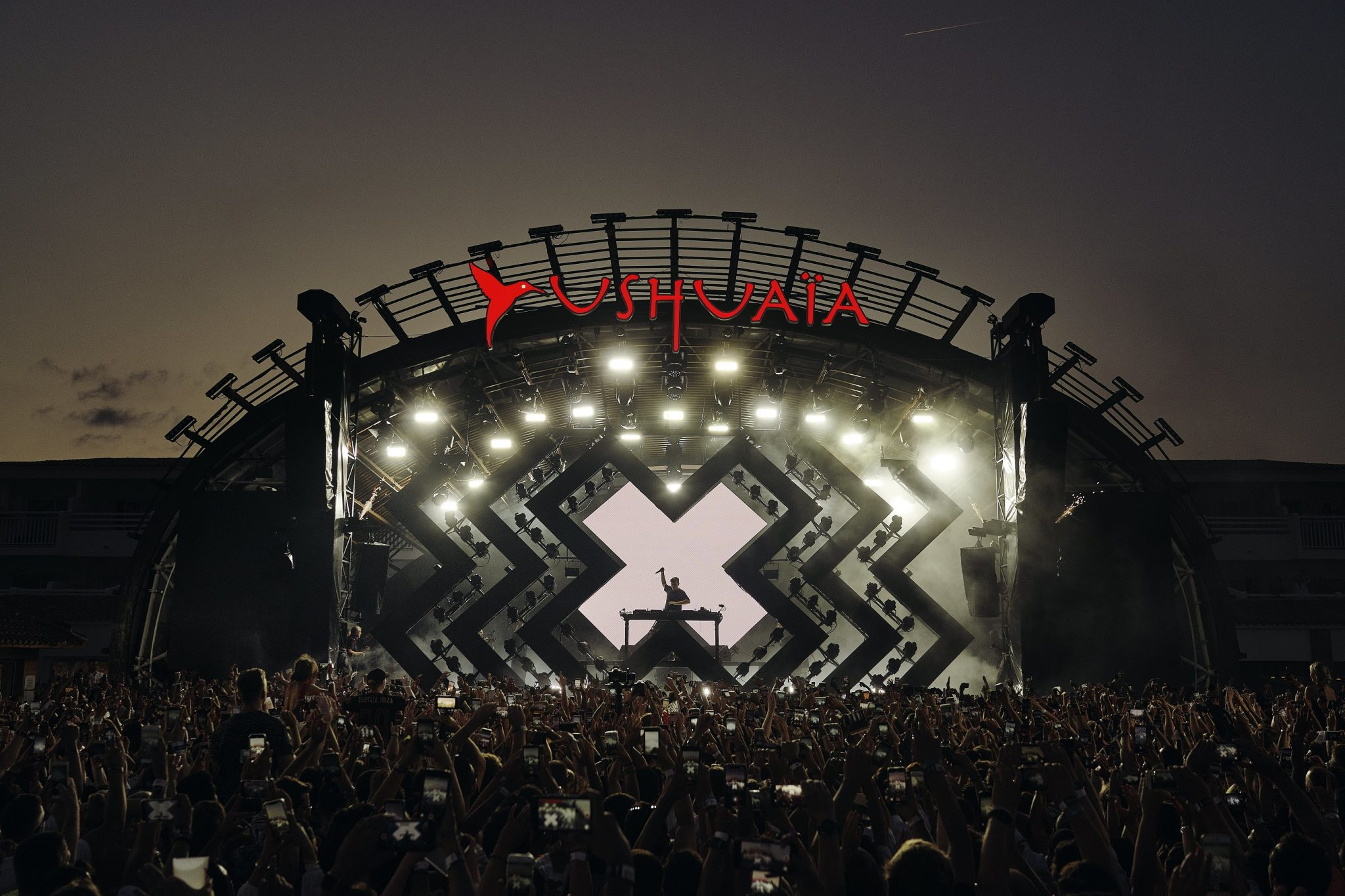
- Martin Garrix playing live in 2019
- Interactive map of Ushuaïa Ibiza Beach Hotel
- Location: Platja d'en Bossa, Ibiza, Balearic Islands, Spain
- Owner: Abel Matutes and Yann Pissenem (co-founders)
- Capacity: 7,866

Construction
- Opened: 2011; 15 years ago

Website
- theushuaiaexperience.com

Ushuaïa is a hotel and outdoor nightclub and dayclub located in Platja d'en Bossa, Ibiza. The brand was founded in 2011 after the meeting of Abel Matutes and Yann Pissenem. The club has a capacity of 7,866 people, and is one of the largest clubs in Ibiza.

== History ==
The Ushuaïa Ibiza Beach Club, formerly named Hotel Fiesta Club, opened in 2008, and was overseen by Yann Pissenem. It hosted parties for the following 3 years until 2011, when Pissenem met Abel Matutes Juan, a former Spanish politician who was the president of the Fiesta Hotel Group (renamed in 2012 to Palladium Hotel Group).

Following the meeting of Matutes and Pissenem, the former Fiesta Club Playa d’en Bossa underwent renovations with the help of Pissenem's brother, Romain Pissenem and Matutes's son, Abel Matutes Prats, and was combined with Pissenem's Ushuaïa Ibiza Beach Club to form The Ushuaïa Club Hotel. According to Andy McKay, the concept of hotel + daytime party comes from the Ibiza Rocks hotel.

In 2013, the Fiesta Playa d'en Bossa Hotel, owned by Palladium and adjacent to The Ushuaïa Club Hotel, was also remodeled and became The Ushuaïa Tower. The two properties combined include 3 different restaurants, and 415 rooms.

In July 2019, the club hosted Swedish House Mafia during their Save the World Reunion Tour, after the group announced the date in April of that year.

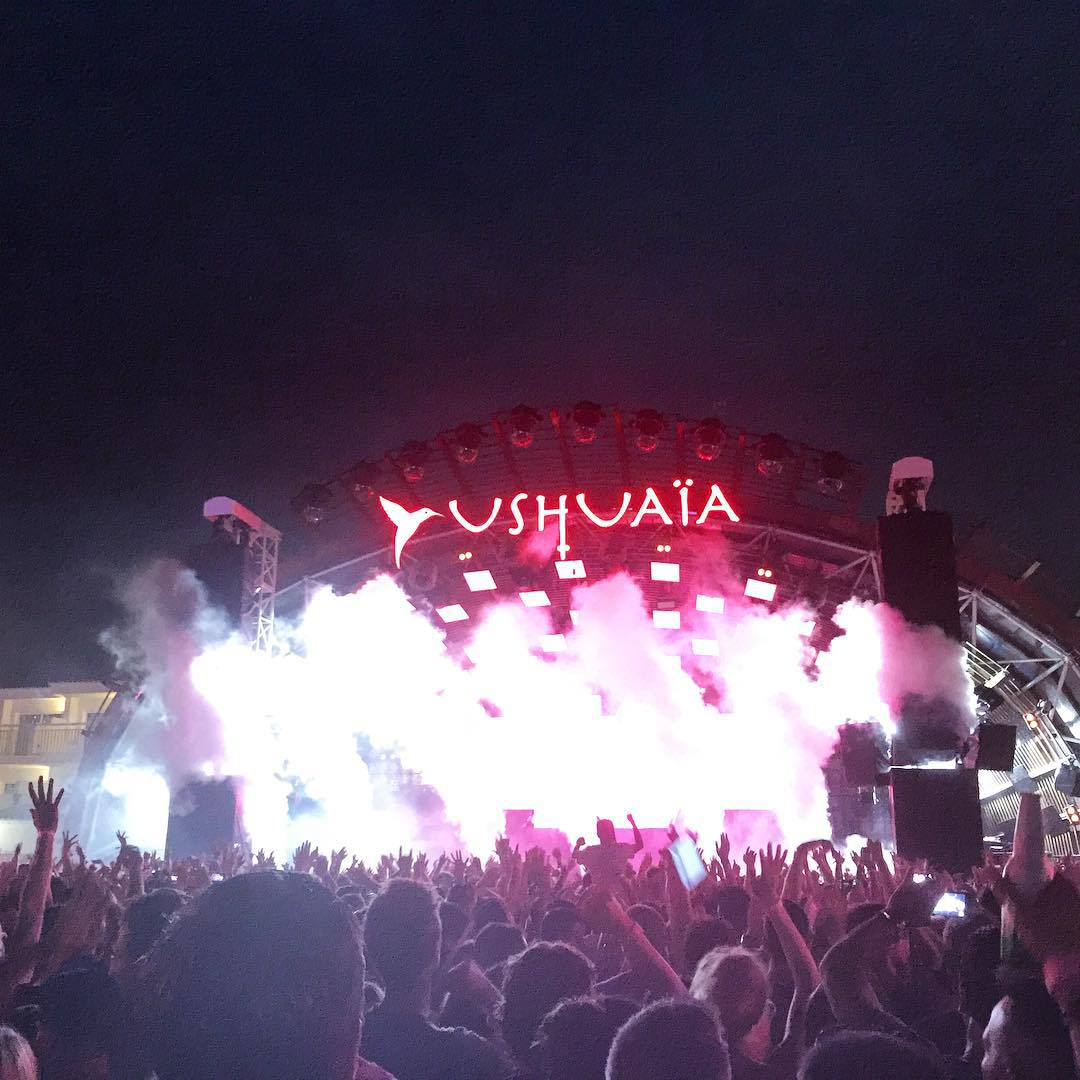
Avicii playing live in 2015

The club's regular residents include mainstream DJs such as David Guetta, Martin Garrix, Calvin Harris, Tiësto, Kygo, Dimitri Vegas & Like Mike, Swedish House Mafia, Hardwell and Armin van Buuren, alongside their own regular "Ants" show. The late Avicii was also a regular resident until his retirement from touring in 2016, playing his final show at the club.

== Awards and nominations ==
=== DJ Magazine's top 100 clubs ===
Year	Position	Notes	Ref.
2012	67	New Entry	
2013	28	—N/a	
2014	11	—N/a	
2015	9	—N/a	
2016	8	—N/a	
2017	6	—N/a	
2018	2	—N/a	
2019	3	—N/a	
2020	4	—N/a	
2021	4	—N/a	

=== International Dance Music Awards ===
Year	Category	Work	Outcome	Ref.
2015	Best Global Club	Ushuaïa – Ibiza, Spain	Won	
2016	Best Global Club	Ushuaïa – Ibiza, Spain	Won	
2018	Best Global Club	Ushuaïa – Ibiza, Spain	Won	
2020	Best Global Club	Ushuaïa – Ibiza, Spain	Won	

=== International Nightlife Association's top 100 clubs ===
Year	Position	Notes	Ref.
2015 (Note: 2015 saw the debut of the chart.)	1	New Entry	
2016	2	—N/a	
2017	1	—N/a	
2018	2	—N/a	
2019	3	—N/a	

== Hï Ibiza ==
After Space closed in 2016, Ushuaïa Entertainment bought the club and reopened it a year later under the name Hï Ibiza. The clubhouse includes a club and a theater, as well as three open-air areas. In 2018, Hï Ibiza hosted the 20th anniversary of the DJ Awards.

=== Awards and nominations ===
==== DJ Magazine's top 100 clubs ====
Year	Position	Notes	Ref.
2018	5	New Entry	
2019	4	—N/a	
2020	2	—N/a	
2021	3	—N/a	
2022	1	—N/a	
2023	1	—N/a	

==== International Nightlife Association's top 100 clubs ====
Year	Position	Notes	Ref.
2017	5	New Entry	
2018	1	—N/a	
2019	—N/a		
