= Green Valley =

Green Valley is a common place name in English. It may refer to:

== Places ==
=== Antarctica ===
- Green Valley (Antarctica), in the Thiel Mountains

=== Australia ===
- Green Valley, New South Wales, a suburb of Sydney
- Green Valley, Western Australia, a locality of Albany

=== Brazil ===
- Green Valley, nightclub in Camboriú, Brazil.

=== United States ===
==== California ====
- Green Valley, El Dorado County, California, a former settlement
- Green Valley, Los Angeles County, California, a census-designated place
- Green Valley, (Cuyamaca Mountains, California), in San Diego County
- Green Valley, Solano County, California, a census-designated place
- Green Valley, former name of Greenwood, El Dorado County, California
- Green Valley of Russian River Valley AVA, an American Viticultural Area in Sonoma County
- Green Valley Creek, a stream in Sonoma County
- Green Valley Acres, California, an unincorporated community in El Dorado County

==== Wisconsin ====
- Green Valley, Marathon County, Wisconsin, a town
- Green Valley, Shawano County, Wisconsin, a town
  - Green Valley (CDP), Wisconsin, an unincorporated census-designated place in the town of Green Valley, Shawano County

==== Other states ====
- Green Valley, Arizona, a census-designated place in Pima County
- Green Valley, Illinois, a village in Tazewell County
- Green Valley, Maryland, an unincorporated area and former census-designated place in Frederick County
- Green Valley, Minnesota, an unincorporated community in Lyon County
- Green Valley Township, Becker County, Minnesota
- Green Valley Township, Holt County, Nebraska
- Green Valley, Henderson, a planned community in Henderson, Nevada
- Green Valley, Ohio, an unincorporated community in Knox County
- Green Valley, South Dakota, a census-designated place and unincorporated community in Pennington County
- Green Valley, Virginia
- Green Valley, Kanawha County, West Virginia
- Green Valley, Mercer County, West Virginia
- Green Valley, Nicholas County, West Virginia

=== Other places ===
- Green Valley (Mars), landing site of NASA's Phoenix lander within Vastitas Borealis

== Music ==
- Green Valley (band), a Spanish reggae-dancehall group
- "Green Valley", song from ...So the Story Goes
- "Green Valley", a 2012 song by Calvin Harris from 18 Months
- "The Green Valley", song by Puscifer from Conditions of My Parole

== Other uses ==
- Green valley, a part of the Galaxy color–magnitude diagram
- Greenvalley Public School, Kerala, India
- The green valley phase in galactic evolution, between more frequently observed blue and red galaxies, as illustrated on a galaxy color–magnitude diagram.

== See also ==
- Green Valley Lake (disambiguation)
- Greendell (disambiguation)
- Greendale (disambiguation)
- Greenvale (disambiguation)
- Green (disambiguation)
- Valley (disambiguation)
- Grunthal (disambiguation) (German for "Green Valley")
- Valverde (disambiguation) (Spanish for "Green Valley")
