= Verde =

Verde, meaning green in several languages, can refer to:

== Places ==
- Aguas Verdes, Peru
- Camp Verde, Arizona, United States
  - Fort Verde State Historic Park, in Camp Verde
- Campina Verde, Brazil
- Cape Verde
- Castro Verde, Portugal
- Verde Island, Philippines
- Verde River, Arizona
- Palos Verdes, California
- Mato Verde, Brazil
- Mesa Verde National Park, Colorado, United States
- Monte Verde, archeological site in Chile
- Ponta Verde, a beach in Brazil
- Rancho Palos Verdes, California
- Rio Verde (disambiguation)
- Val Verde (disambiguation)
- Verde Valley, Arizona, United States

== Other ==
- Verde (surname)
- Verdes FC, a Belize Premier Football League team
- Verde Canyon Railroad, a heritage railroad in Arizona
- Vinho Verde, a type of Portuguese wine
- Verde (grape), another name for the Italian wine grape Verdeca
- Visualizing Energy Resources Dynamically on the Earth (VERDE), a software visualization and analysis capability of the United States Department of Energy
- "Verde", a song by J Balvin from Colores, 2020
- Caldo verde, a Portuguese green soup
- TV Verde Vale, a television station in Brazil

== See also ==
- Valverde (disambiguation)
