= Green Valley, West Virginia =

Green Valley, West Virginia may refer to:

- Green Valley, Kanawha County, West Virginia, an unincorporated community in Kanawha County
- Green Valley, Mercer County, West Virginia, an unincorporated community in Mercer County
- Green Valley, Nicholas County, West Virginia, an unincorporated community in Nicholas County
