= Grunthal =

Grünthal or Grunthal (German for green valley) may refer to:

== Places ==
- Grunthal, an unincorporated community
- Grünthal, a part of Röthenbach an der Pegnitz
- Grünthal, a part of Wenzenbach in Bavaria
- Grunthal, see Kreis Kolmar in Posen
- Grunthal, former name of Verdun, Australia

== People ==
- Marianne Grunthal (1896–1945), German educator
- Villem Grünthal-Ridala (1885–1942), Estonian poet, translator, linguist and folklorist
- Ivar Grünthal (dead 1996), Estonian author, poet and writer
- Timotheus Grünthal (dead 1955), politician

== Other uses ==
- Grunthal CMC, Grunthal, Manitoba, Canada; a church, see Chortitzer Mennonite Conference
- Grünthal, a fictional martial arts academy in the manga Battle Angel Alita

== See also ==
- Green Valley (disambiguation)
- Greendale (disambiguation)
