= Untold Festival =

Annual electronic music festival in Romania

Coordinates: 46.768453°N 23.572372°E

UNTOLD Festival
- Genre: EDM (main), trance, techno, house, electro house, progressive house, pop, indie pop, hip hop, drum and bass, dubstep, reggae, jazz, R&B, soul
- Dates: 5–8 August 2027
- Locations: Cluj-Napoca, Romania
- Years active: 2015–present
- Attendance: 500,000 (2026)
- Organiser: SHARE Cluj-Napoca Federation
- Website: Official website

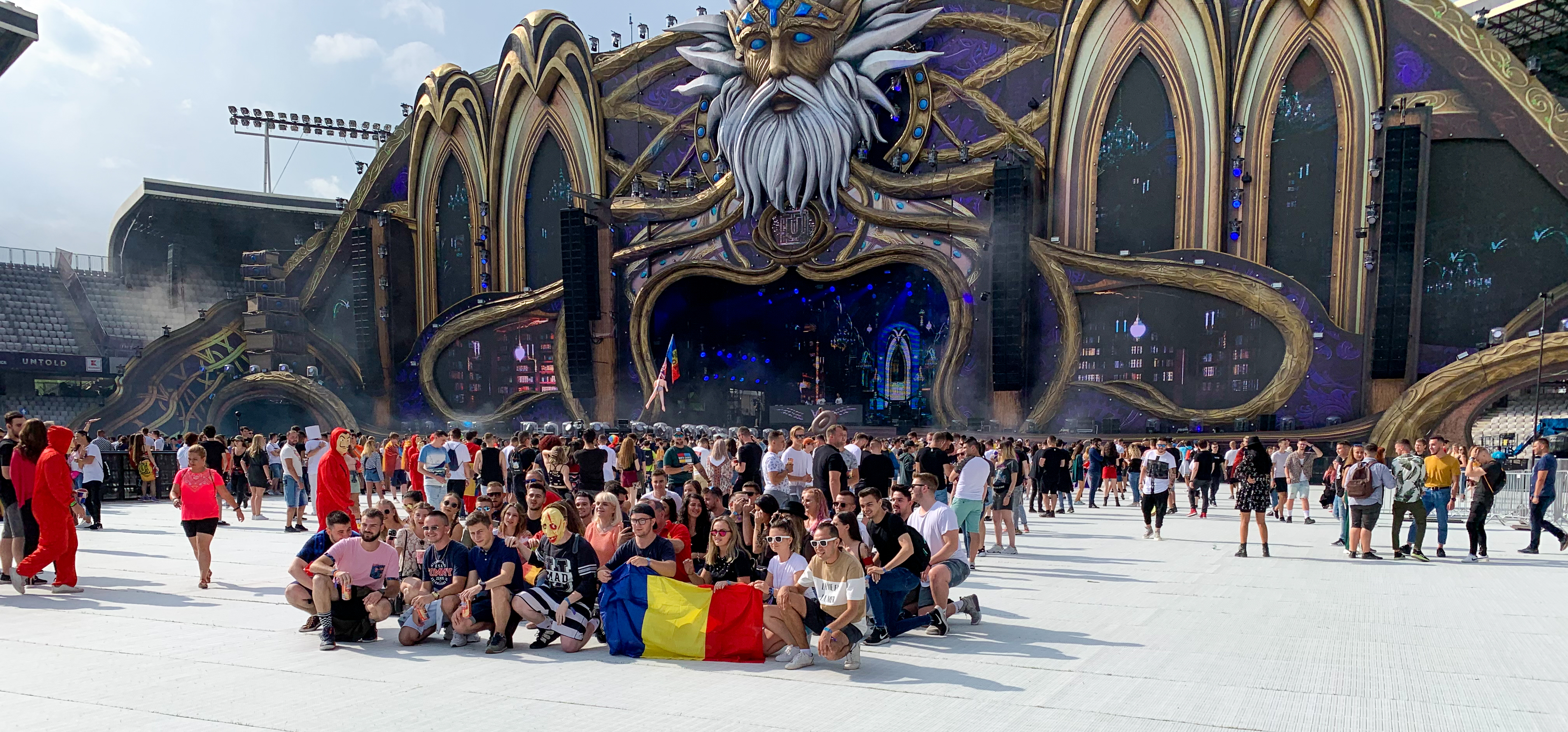
People holding the Romanian flag at Untold 2019

Untold Festival is the largest electronic music festival held in Romania, taking place in Cluj-Napoca at the Cluj Arena. It is held annually and was designated Best Major Festival at the European Festival Awards 2015. Guests come from a vast range of European countries, as well as Asia and North America. Untold has other versions of the festival specially created for different locations: Neversea, a beach-dedicated festival which takes place in Constanța since 2017; Massif, a mountain-dedicated festival held in Poiana Brașov since 2023; Untold Dubai, an international version of the festival scheduled to take place in Dubai starting in 2024 and Kapital, a festival created for Bucharest, held on Arena Națională since 2025.

It is notable for both being held very close to residential areas and exempt from curfews, with the performances stretching well into the morning hours.

== History ==
Untold's official website refers to editions as chapters.

=== Untold: Chapter 1 ===
The first edition of the festival took place in 2015 mainly on Cluj Arena, when Cluj-Napoca was appointed the European Youth Capital. The main artists that performed were: Armin van Buuren, Avicii, David Guetta, Dimitri Vegas & Like Mike and ATB. Other performing artists were: Duke Dumont, Fedde Le Grand, Lost Frequencies, Sasha, Sunnery James & Ryan Marciano, Tinie Tempah, Tom Odell, John Newman, Fatman Scoop, Tujamo, John Digweed, Patrice, Boney M, Culture Beat and East 17, among others. During the four days of the festival, more than 240,000 people attended the concerts held on several stages in the centre of Cluj-Napoca. It pulled in €20 million in revenue.

=== Untold: Chapter 2 ===
The second edition of Untold took place in 2016, from 4 to 7 August mainly on Cluj Arena. It welcomed the top 5 DJ's of the world polled by DJ Mag that year: Tiësto, Hardwell, Martin Garrix, Dimitri Vegas & Like Mike and Armin van Buuren, along with Afrojack. Other performing live artists were: Dannic, Fedde Le Grand, Naughty Boy, Lost Frequencies, Faithless, Parov Stellar, Scooter, Ella Eyre, James Arthur, Kwabs, Labrinth, John Digweed, Sasha, Nneka and Tujamo. It took place during four days in the centre of Cluj-Napoca and involved 10 stages. Over 30,000 foreigners attended the 2016 edition. The festival itself attracted a crowd of 300,000 over four days.

=== Untold: Chapter 3 - Real Life Fantasy ===
The third edition of the festival took place from 3 to 6 August 2017 on Cluj Arena. There were seven DJ headliners who were announced in January 2017: Afrojack, Armin van Buuren, Axwell Λ Ingrosso, Dimitri Vegas & Like Mike, Hardwell, Martin Garrix, Marshmello and Steve Aoki. In March the live acts were announced, these being: Ellie Goulding, Example, Hurts, Jasmine Thompson, MØ, John Newman and Tinie Tempah. The festival took place during four days in the centre of Cluj-Napoca and involved 10 stages. Other performing artists were: Alan Walker, Don Diablo, Dillon Francis, Charli XCX, Redfoo, Era Istrefi, The Avener, Dannic, Lost Frequencies, Sander van Doorn, Dubfire, Kadebostany, Jamie Jones, Loco Dice, Solomun, Sven Väth, Andy C, Borgore, Pendulum, Chase & Status and GTA, among others. It sold over 330,000 tickets for the four days of Untold and reported record profit (more than in 2015). Untold organisers invested more than €10 million in the festival.

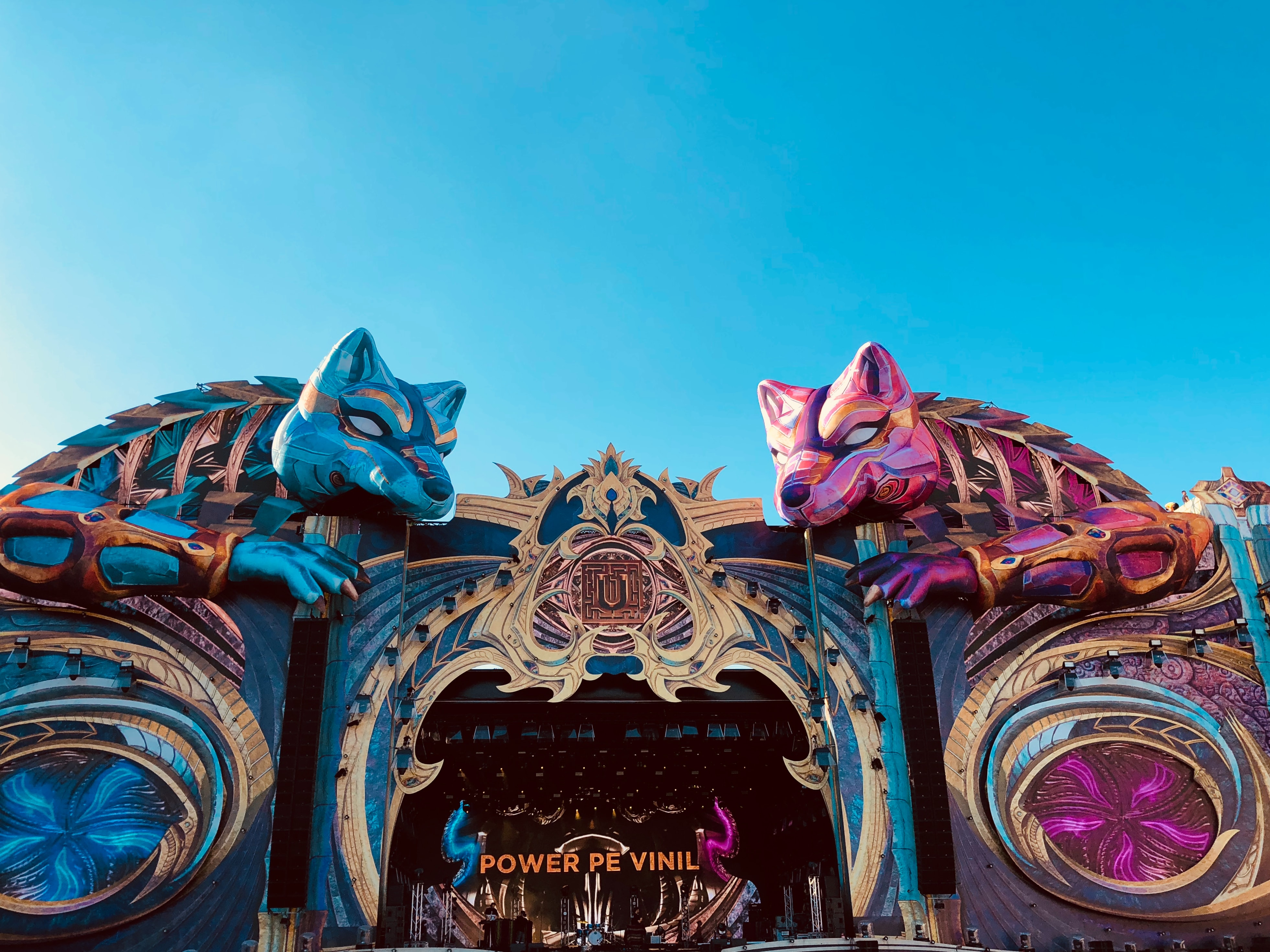
Untold 2018 stage

=== Untold: Chapter 4 - Wolf Spirit ===
The fourth edition of the Untold festival was held from 2 to 5 August 2018. The first artists announced for the 2018 edition are: Black Eyed Peas, KSHMR, The Prodigy, Bonobo, Afrojack, Armin van Buuren, Alesso, Dimitri Vegas & Like Mike, Diplo, Kygo, The Chainsmokers, Jason Derulo, Tiësto, Fedde Le Grand and Steve Aoki.

=== Untold: Chapter 5 - The Codex of Magic ===
The fifth edition of the Untold festival was held from 1 to 4 August 2019. The first two rounds of ticket sales sold out within respectively 3 and 10 minutes, each having 15,000 festival tickets available. Amongst the first artists announced for the 2019 edition were: Robbie Williams, Martin Garrix, David Guetta, Bastille, James Arthur, Dimitri Vegas & Like Mike, Timmy Trumpet, Boris Brejcha, Silenzio and Tale Of Us. Armin van Buuren released the official anthem of Untold Chapter 5, "Something Real", on 12 July 2019.

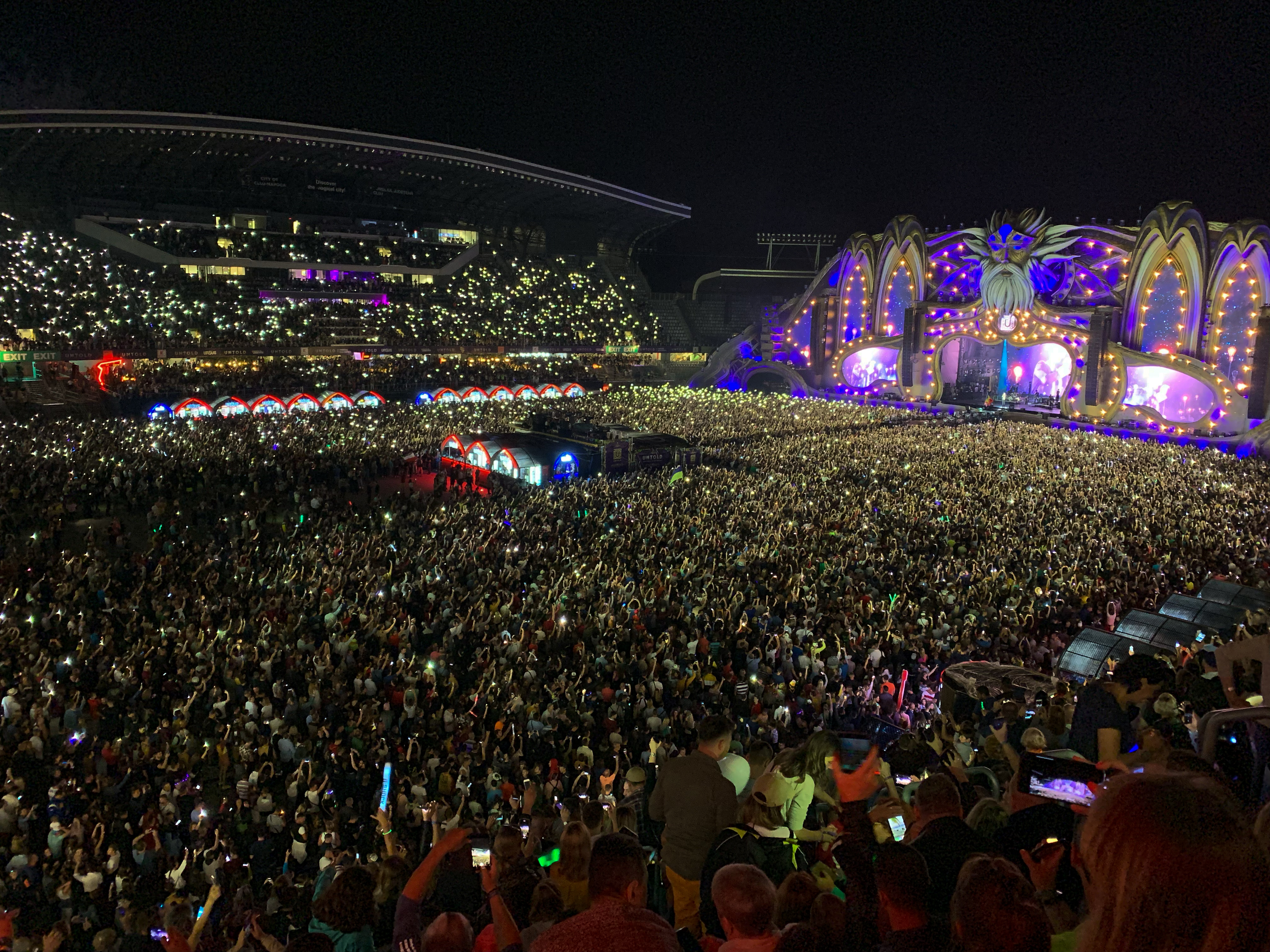
Untold 2019 mainstage at night

The festival, in conjunction with YouTube Music, officially released 6 playlists exclusive to the service, which are the UNTOLD Main Stage, UNTOLD Alchemy, UNTOLD Fortune, UNTOLD Forest, Daydreaming Experience and UNTOLD Galaxy

This edition gathered a crowd of 370,000 over four days, making it the most successful chapter in history.

=== Untold: Chapter 6 ===
The sixth edition of Untold is planned to take place in 9–12 September 2021. The event was postponed due to COVID-19 outbreak. Announcement on the 2021 festival will be posted 15 December 2020, Refunds and tickets to the next 3 festivals are available to 2020 ticket holders.https://untold.com/faqpostponement

=== Untold: Chapter 7 - Temple of Luna ===
The seventh edition of the festival took place between 4 and 7 August 2022. The main headliners were J Balvin, Anne-Marie and a wide range of DJs: Kygo, Lost Frequencies, David Guetta, Steve Aoki, Dimitri Vegas & Like Mike, Tujamo, Paul Kalkbrenner, Kasia Sobczyk.

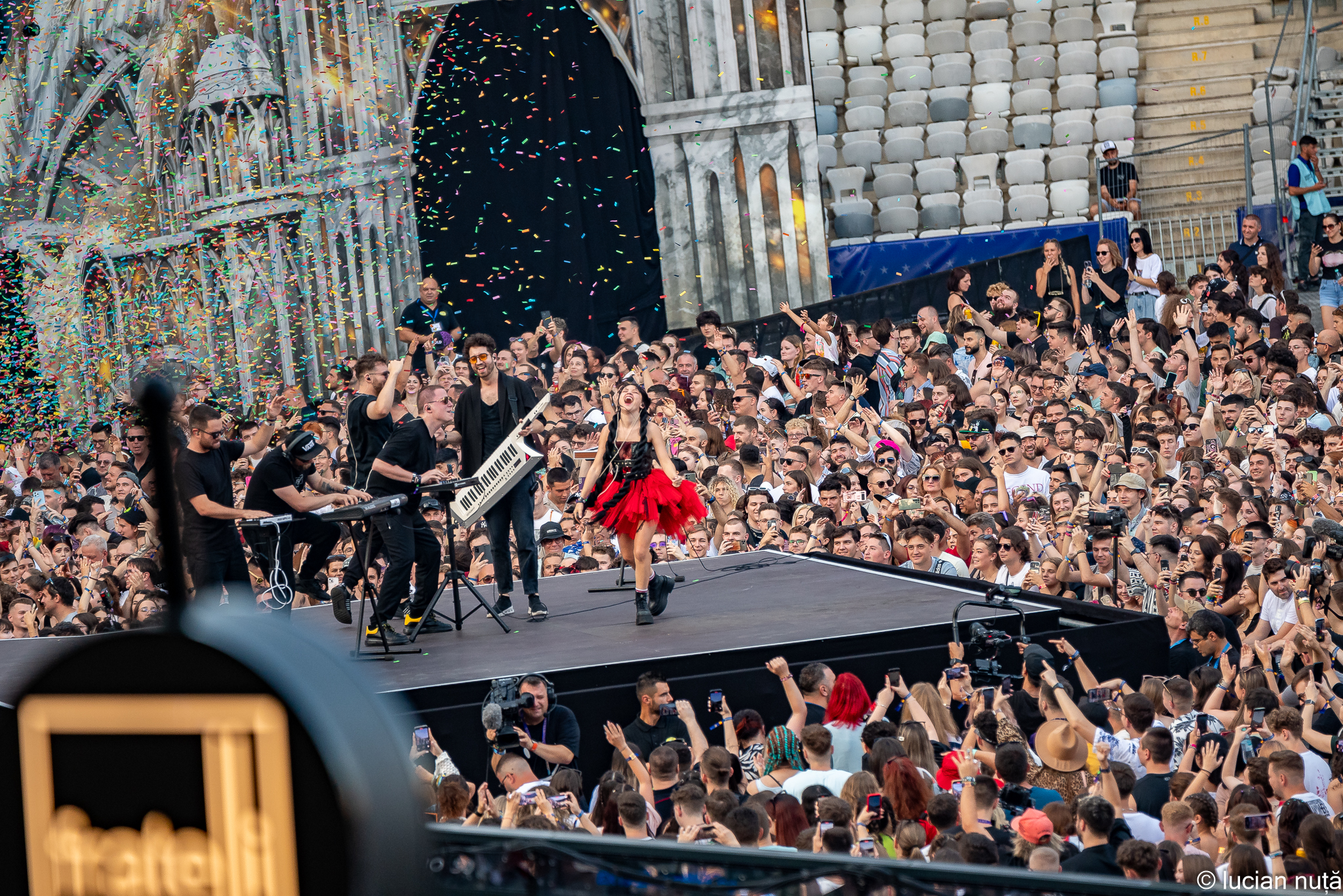
Irina Rimes on Untold 2023 stage

=== Untold: Chapter 8 - The Light Phoenix ===
The eighth edition of the festival took place between 3 and 6 August 2023. The edition surpassed the 5th edition in attendance numbers, with over 420,000 people in four days. The main headliners included major acts like Imagine Dragons, Ava Max and Bebe Rexha and it marked also the return of Armin van Buuren after 4 years at Untold. Other artists were Martin Garrix, Eric Prydz, Alok, David Guetta, Topic and Steve Aoki. After this edition, the festival took 6th position on DJ Mag Top 100 Festivals.

=== Untold: Chapter 9 - Human is Nature ===
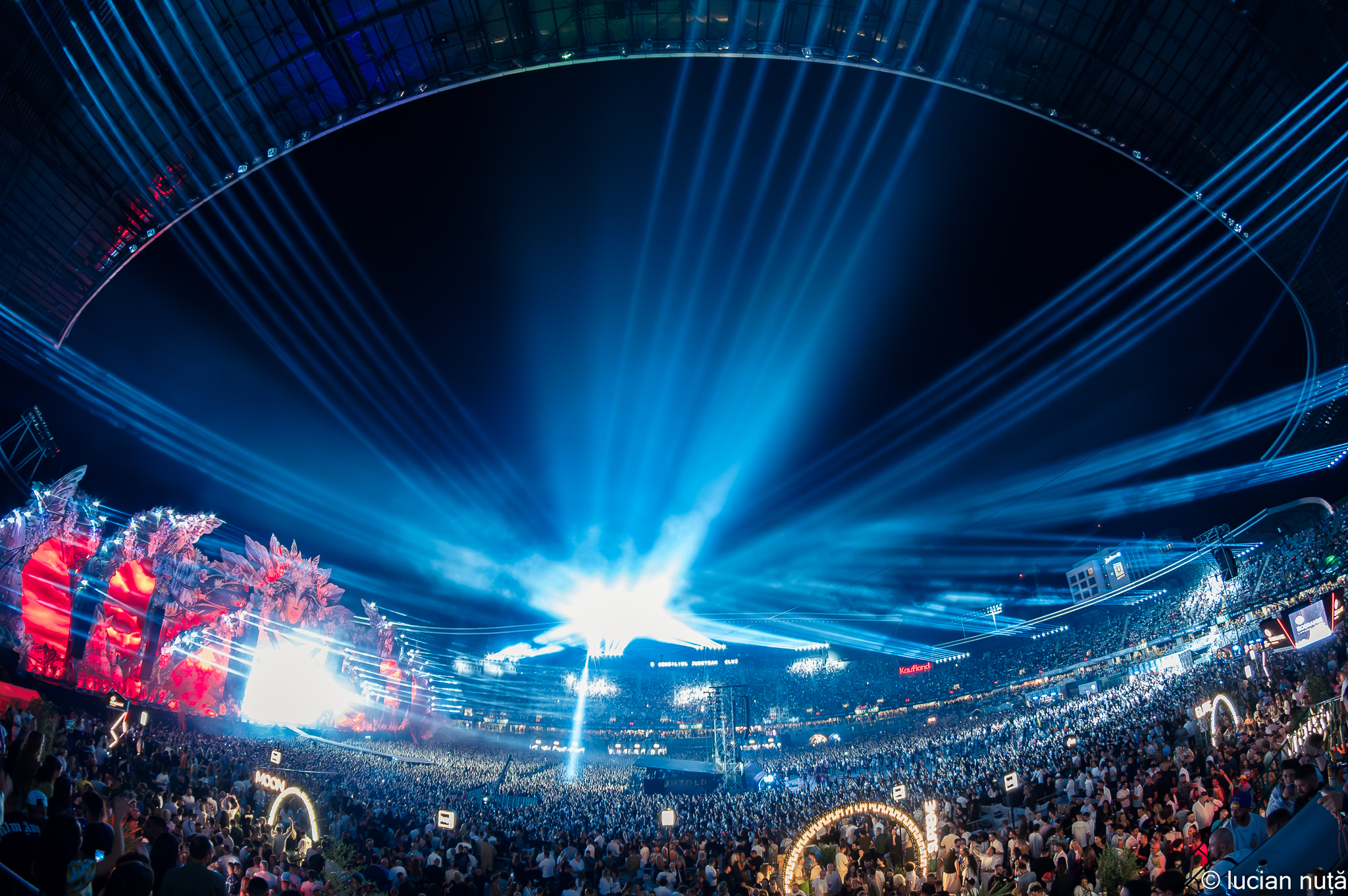
Untold 2024 stage

The ninth edition of the festival took place between 8 and 11 August 2024. On 7 December 2023, it was revealed the first 2 major acts of the festival: Swedish House Mafia and Sam Smith. On 21 March 2024 new artists were revealed including Alok, Dimitri Vegas & Like Mike, Lost Frequencies, Martin Garrix, Purple Disco Machine, Timmy Trumpet, Carl Cox, Fisher and Solomun. On 4 April 2024, a new major act was revealed: Lenny Kravitz. Other artists include Louis Tomlinson, Steve Aoki, Jax Jones, Burna Boy, Zerb, Tujamo, Nicky Romero, Milky Chance, Mahmut Orhan, Tom Grennan, Blasterjaxx and Salvatore Ganacci. In 2024, the festival took 3rd position on DJ Mag Top 100 Festivals. Over 427.000 persons attended at this edition.

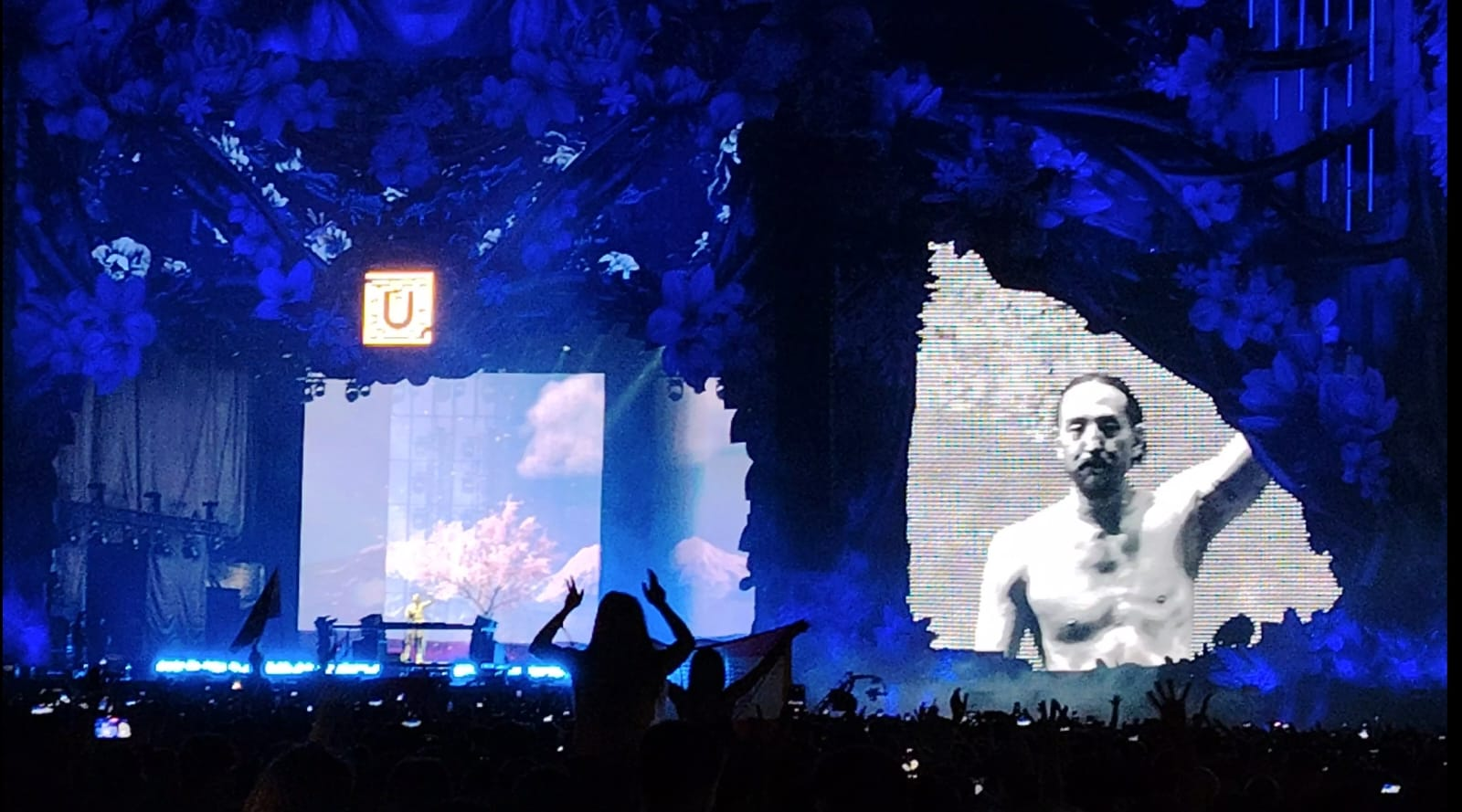
Steve Aoki at Untold 2024

=== Untold X: Chapter 10 - Let Your Soul Shine ===
The tenth edition of the festival will mark the 10th anniversary of Untold. The first tickets were put on sale on 10 August 2024, been sold over 40.000 tickets. It took place between 7 and 10 August 2025. Post Malone and Metro Boomin are the main live acts of the line-up along Anyma and Armin van Buuren as the main DJs. Other artists are Martin Garrix, Alan Walker, Alok, Don Diablo, Tiesto, Hugel, Becky Hill, Fisher, Dom Dolla, Artbat, Adriatique and a surprise act that will be revealed in the day when they will perform, revealed Friday to be Salvatore Ganacci. Also local artists like Delia, Irina Rimes or Inna will have special moments for the anniversary edition with special guests. The festival remained on the 3rd position on DJ Mag Top 100 Festivals. Over 470.000 persons attended at this edition.

=== Untold Chapter 11: One ===
The eleventh edition of the festival will mark a new era of Untold and will take place between 6 and 9 August 2026. The first tickets were put on sale on 9 August 2025. On 3 February 2026, it was announced the first wave of artists: Flo Rida, Swae Lee, The Chainsmokers, Kygo, Lost Frequencies, Sebastian Ingrosso, Marshmello, Steve Aoki, Afrojack, R3hab and more. On 4 February Martin Garrix was added in the line-up. On 5 February Lewis Capaldi was announced as headliner of this edition. On 19 March Zara Larsson was added in the line-up as headliner. Over 500.000 persons attended at this edition and the festival remained on the 3rd position on DJ Mag Top 100 Festivals.

=== Untold Chapter 12: Star Edition ===
During the One edition, the twelfth edition, known as Star Edition was announced and will take place between 5 and 8 August 2027. The first tickets were put on sale on 8 August 2026. Over 20.000 tickets were sold on the first phase only in few hours. Pitbull was announced as the first live headliner of this edition on 17 November 2026, while the first wave of artists includes DJ Snake, Timmy Trumpet, Holy Priest, Boris Brejcha and Yousuke Yukimatsu.

== Reception ==
Untold Festival has received wide international acclaim. It was named the Best Major Festival in Europe at the 2015 European Festival Awards and ranked third globally in DJ Mag’s 2024 Top 100 Festivals list. Publications like Mixmag and DJ Mag have credited the event with establishing Romania as a major destination for electronic music and praised its production value and cultural significance. Local news outlets also highlight its positive economic impact; the 2023 edition attracted over 420,000 participants and generated an estimated €70–120 million for Cluj-Napoca. The mayor of Cluj and local businesses have consistently endorsed the festival for boosting the city’s visibility and tourism.

However, Untold has also drawn criticism regarding its disruptive impact on Cluj-Napoca. Residents and NGOs have objected to late-night noise, street closures, and the prolonged occupation of public spaces like Cluj-Napoca Central Park and the Cluj Arena area, which fenced off and inaccessible to the general public for more than a week, sparking recurring complaints from locals about the privatization of public space. Critics highlight the close proximity of multiple hospitals, including a children's hospital directly adjacent to the festival grounds, raising concerns about sleep disruption and emergency access during overnight performances and fireworks. A 2019 academic study found that the festival restricted public access, generated noise pollution, and contributed to increased waste, traffic, and cost of living during the event. Various reports that surfaced in local media, including from the Romanian Court of Auditors and investigative journalists revealed that Untold received city funds despite turning a profit, and that public land was leased for below-market rates or occupied illegally.

== Line-ups ==
=== Overview 2015–present ===
#	Year	Dates	Guests	Headliners & Artists
1	2015	30 July - 2 August	240,000	Armin van Buuren; Avicii; David Guetta; Lost Frequencies; Tom Odell; Duke Dumont; Dimitri Vegas & Like Mike
2	2016	4 - 7 August	300,000	Hardwell; Martin Garrix; Tiësto; Lost Frequencies; Armin van Buuren; Afrojack; Ella Eyre; Labrinth; Dimitri Vegas & Like Mike
3	2017	3 - 6 August	330,000	Marshmello; Ellie Goulding; MØ; Charli XCX; Hardwell; Martin Garrix; Steve Aoki; Armin van Buuren; Redfoo; Era Istrefi; Axwell & Ingrosso
4	2018	2 - 5 August	335,000	Black Eyed Peas; The Chainsmokers; Jason Derulo; Diplo; Kygo; Armin van Buuren; KSHMR; Tiësto; Steve Aoki; Alesso
5	2019	1 - 4 August	370,000	Robbie Williams; Bastille (band); David Guetta; Martin Garrix; James Arthur; Dimitri Vegas & Like Mike; Timmy Trumpet
6	2020	30 July - 2 August	Cancelled	The Pussycat Dolls; Iggy Azalea; The Script; David Guetta; Martin Garrix; Dimitri Vegas & Like Mike; Steve Aoki; Afrojack; Lost Frequencies; Alesso; DJ Snake
7	2021	9 - 12 September	265,000	Tyga; The Script; David Guetta; Martin Garrix; Armin van Buuren; Dimitri Vegas & Like Mike; Afrojack; Steve Aoki; Lost Frequencies; Alok (DJ); DJ Snake
8	2022	4 - 7 August	360,000	J Balvin; Anne-Marie; Kygo; Lost Frequencies; David Guetta; Steve Aoki; Dimitri Vegas & Like Mike; Tujamo; Paul Kalkbrenner
9	2023	3 - 6 August	420,000	Imagine Dragons; Ava Max; Bebe Rexha; Armin van Buuren; Martin Garrix; Eric Prydz; French Montana; David Guetta; Steve Aoki; Topic (DJ); Alok
10	2024	8 - 11 August	427,000	Swedish House Mafia; Sam Smith; Louis Tomlinson; Lenny Kravitz; Martin Garrix; Carl Cox; Purple Disco Machine; Burna Boy; Tom Grennan; Salvatore Ganacci
11	2025	7 - 10 August	470,000	Post Malone; Metro Boomin; Anyma; Becky Hill; Alan Walker; Armin van Buuren; Don Diablo; Tiësto; Fisher (musician)
12	2026	6 - 9 August	500,000	Zara Larsson; Lewis Capaldi; Sting (musician); Swae Lee; Flo Rida; The Chainsmokers; Meduza (producers); Mestiza (DJs); R3hab; Marshmello; Kygo; Steve Aoki; Martin Garrix; Afrojack; Lost Frequencies; Denzel Curry; Bbno$
13	2027	5-8 August		Pitbull; DJ Snake; Timmy Trumpet; Holy Priest; Boris Brejcha; Yousuke Yukimatsu

== Stages ==
=== Mainstage ===
The mainstage is the place where the main acts such as DJs or live acts have their show and it is localized in Cluj Arena. The stage is designed after a theme of the festival inspired by Romanian fairytales and folklore. The stage is usually opened by local artists and closed by international artists. The size of the stage grow up through every edition of the festival.

=== Galaxy Stage ===
Galaxy Stage is the second stage of the festival that is dedicated for techno music. It is localized in BTarena. Local and international techno DJs have their shows on this stage.

=== Daydreaming Stage ===
Daydreaming Stage is dedicated for chill house and afro house DJs.

=== Alchemy Stage ===
Alchemy Stage is dedicated for urban music such as trap and drum'n'bass.

=== Time Stage ===
Time Stage is dedicated usually for chill music. Many local Djs and even local celebreties have shows on this stage.

=== Tram Stage ===
Tram Stage is created in a tram and is dedicated for local DJs of different genres of dance music.

=== Retro Stage ===
Retro Stage is dedicated for nostalgic music and hits.

=== Fortune Stage ===
Fortune Stage is dedicated for trance music.

== Tourism ==
In a bid to support local tourism, 2016 festival goers benefitted from a 50% discount on the admission price for several tourist attractions from the historic region of Transylvania. The festival bracelet allowed visitors to visit at a discounted rate a series of major sights such as Bran Castle, Corvin Castle, the Merry Cemetery, the Mocănița Steam Train, the Turda Salt Mines.

== International & National Editions ==
Untold Dubai is the first international edition of Romania’s Untold Festival. The idea of bringing Untold to the Middle East emerged after nearly a decade of success in Europe. In June 2023, organizers announced Untold Dubai as the city’s first-ever mega festival. To mark the launch, they partnered with Armin van Buuren for a historic performance at the Burj Khalifa, setting two world records and generating global attention. The inaugural edition took place from 15 to 18 February 2024 at Expo City Dubai. Billed as Dubai’s first large-scale multi-day music festival, it featured over 100 international artists across multiple stages. The event attracted more than 185,000 attendees from over 150 nationalities and was supported by Dubai’s Department of Economy and Tourism. Following its successful debut, the second edition moved to the larger Dubai Parks & Resorts venue in November 2025, solidifying Untold Dubai’s place as a major annual event in the region.

=== Dubai ===
#	Year	Dates	Guests	Headliners & Artists
1	2024	15 - 18 February	185,000	Armin van Buuren; Ellie Goulding; Bebe Rexha; G-Eazy; Tiësto; Hardwell; Don Diablo; INNA; Major Lazer; Paul Kalkbrenner; Sebastian Ingrosso
2	2025	6 - 9 November	190,000	J Balvin; YUNGBLUD; Swae Lee; Saweetie; Sugababes; Rema (musician); Anyma; Martin Garrix; Armin van Buuren; Alan Walker; Steve Aoki; Axwell; Salvatore Ganacci; Eric Prydz; Nora Fatehi; WizTheMc
3	2026	5 - 8 November		

== Awards ==
Year	Awards	Category	Work	Result	Ref.
2015	European Festival Awards	Best Major Festival	Untold Festival	Won	
2015	International Advertising Association Romania	Brand of the Year	Untold Festival	Won	

== Gallery ==
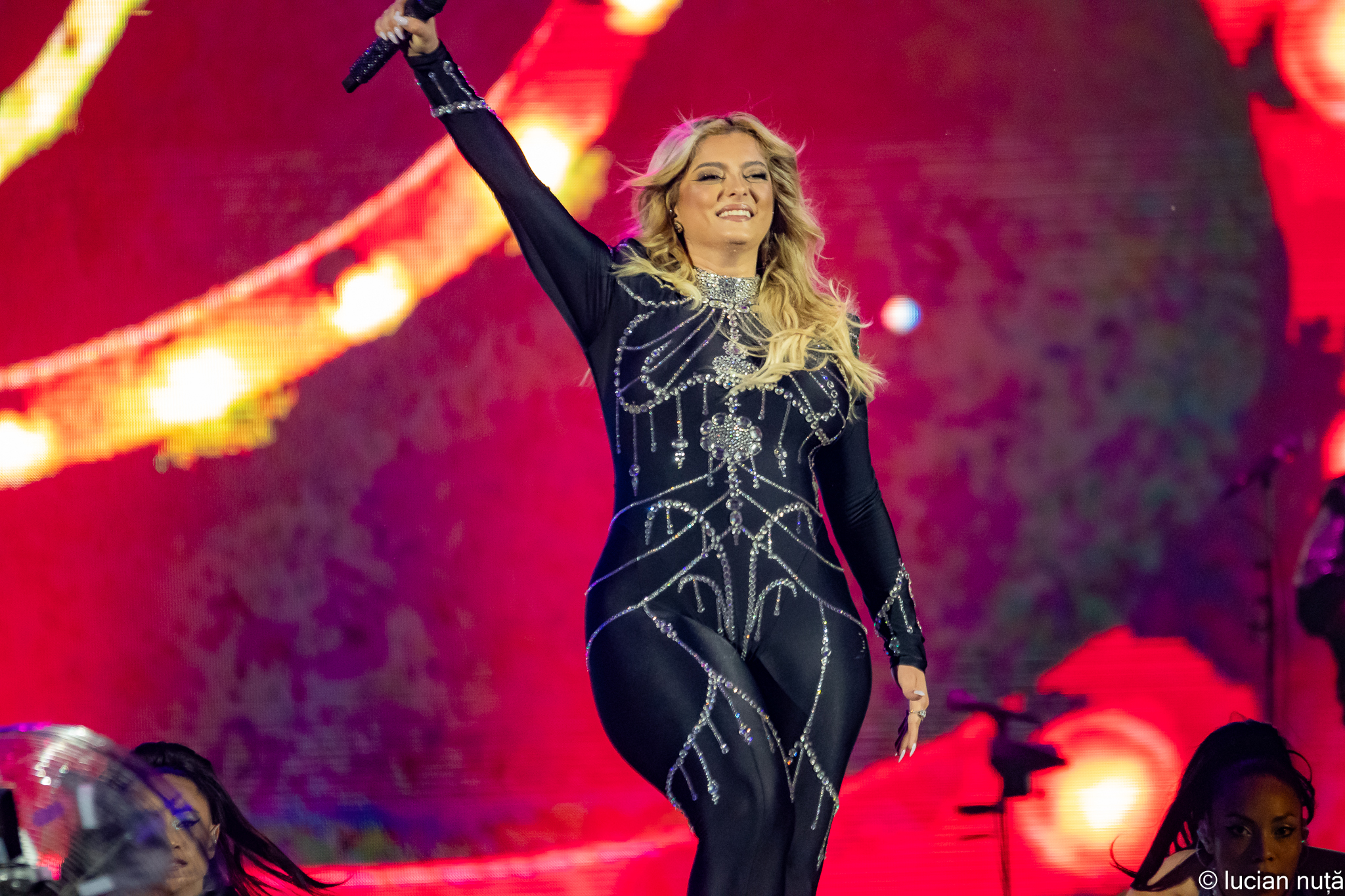
Bebe Rexha at UNTOLD 2023

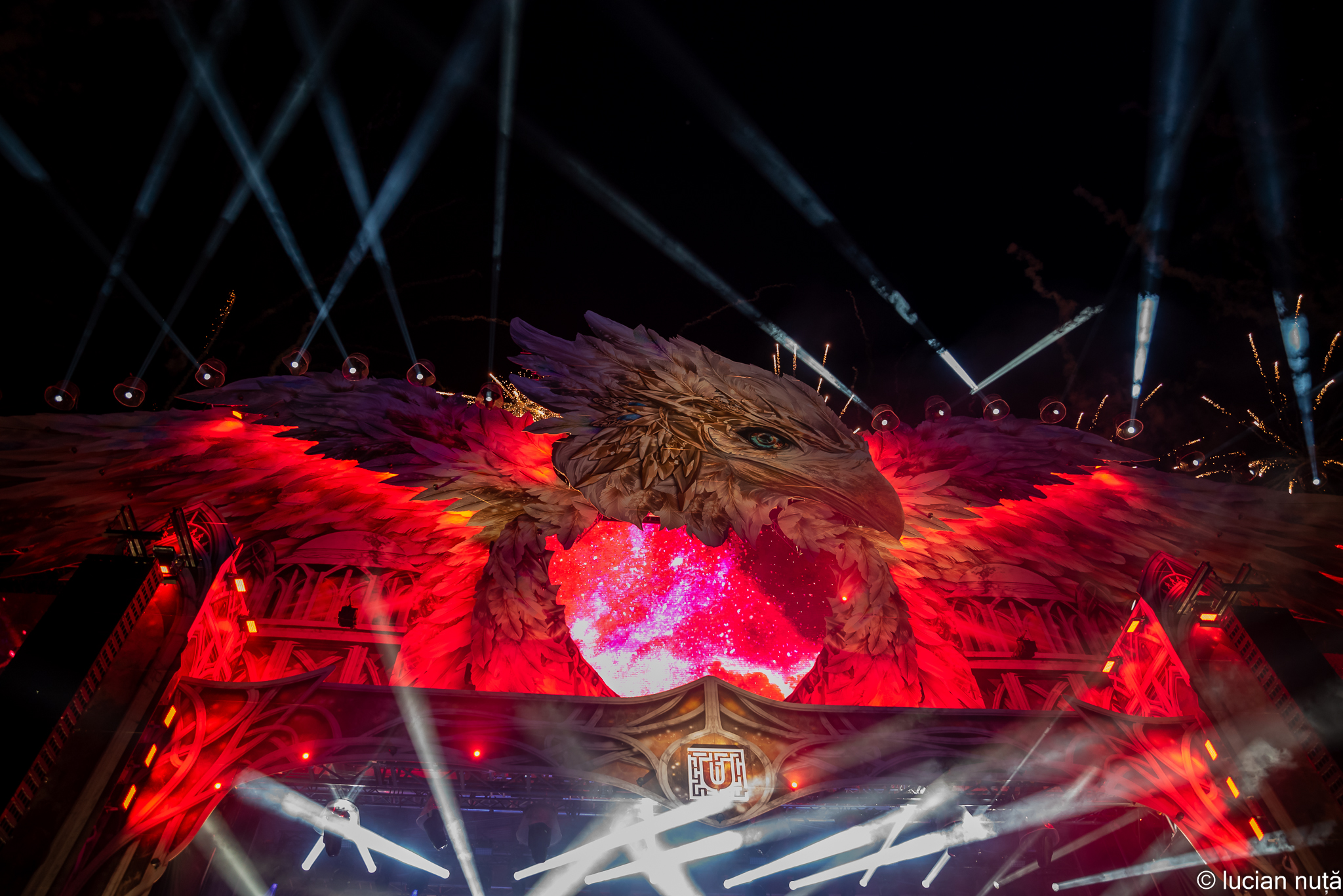
UNTOLD 2023 stage

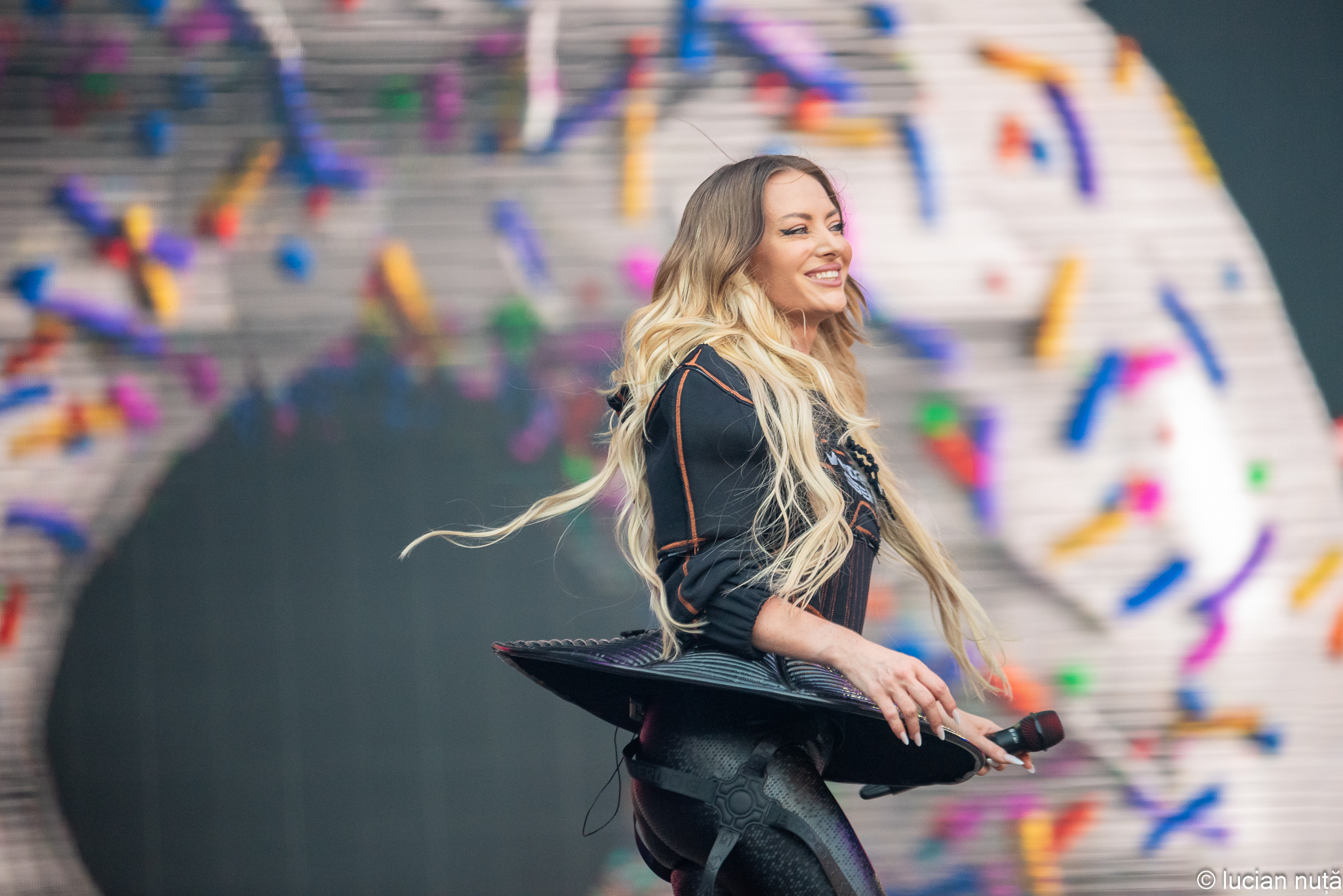
Delia Matache at UNTOLD 2023

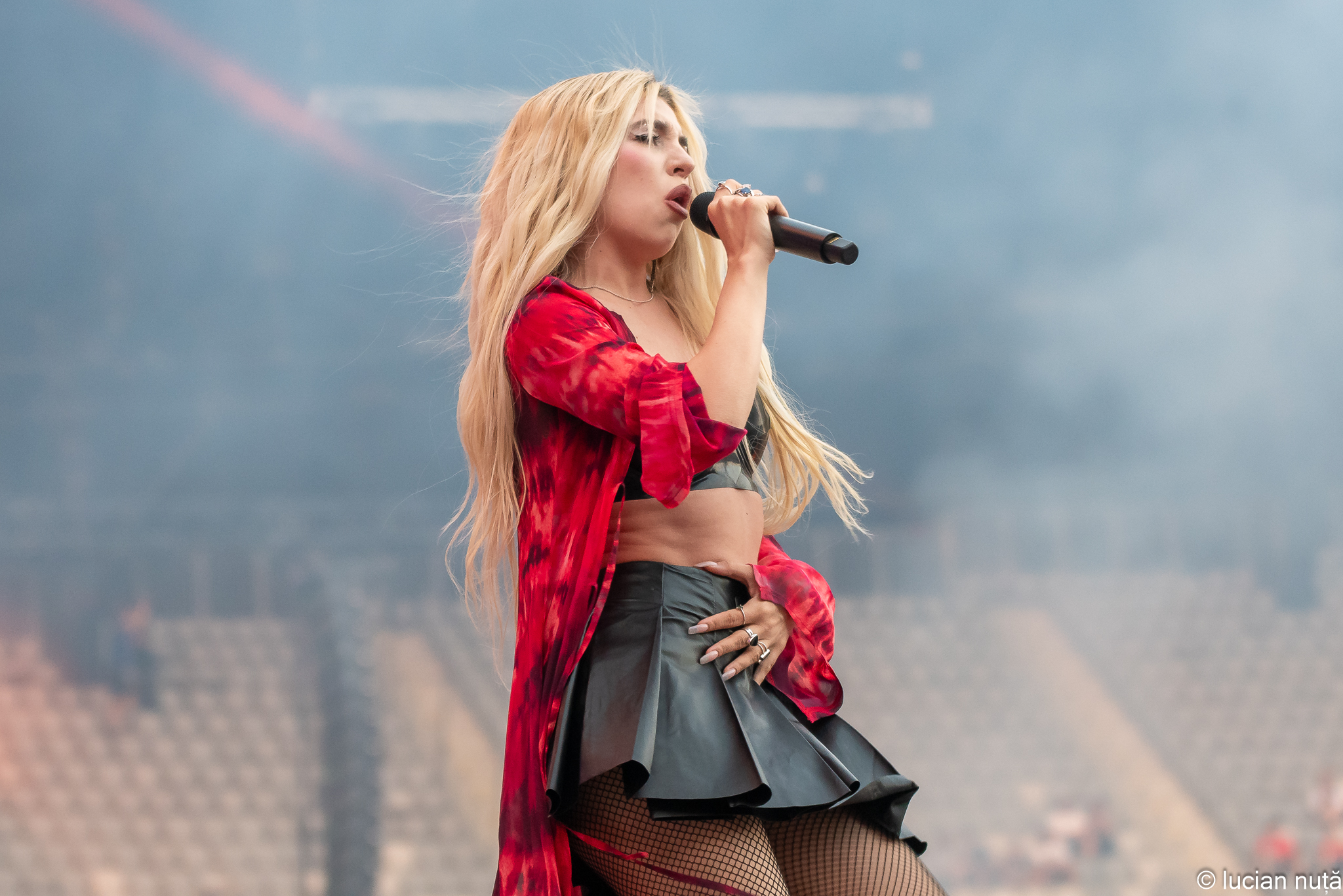
Ava Max at UNTOLD 2023

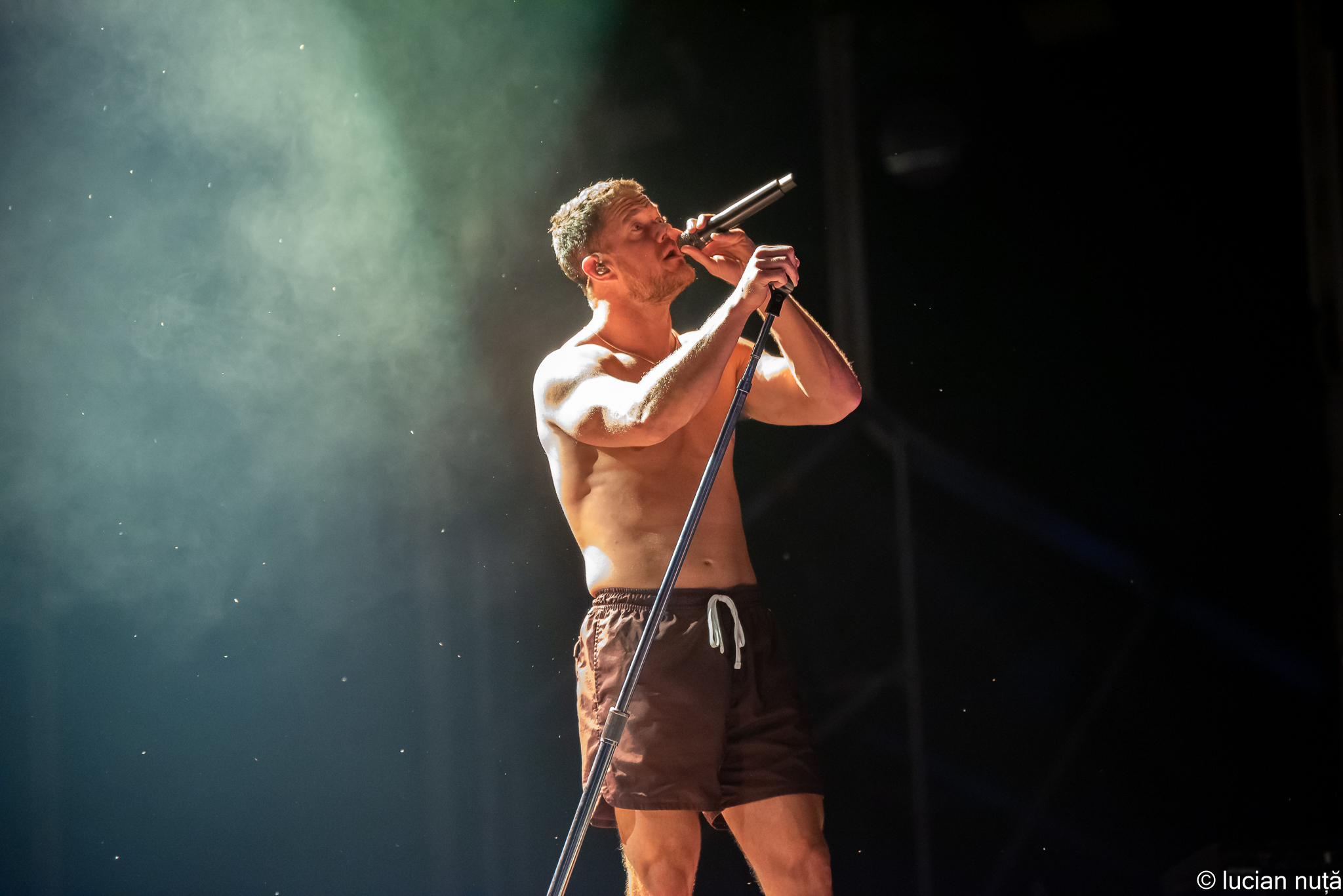
Imagine Dragons at UNTOLD 2023

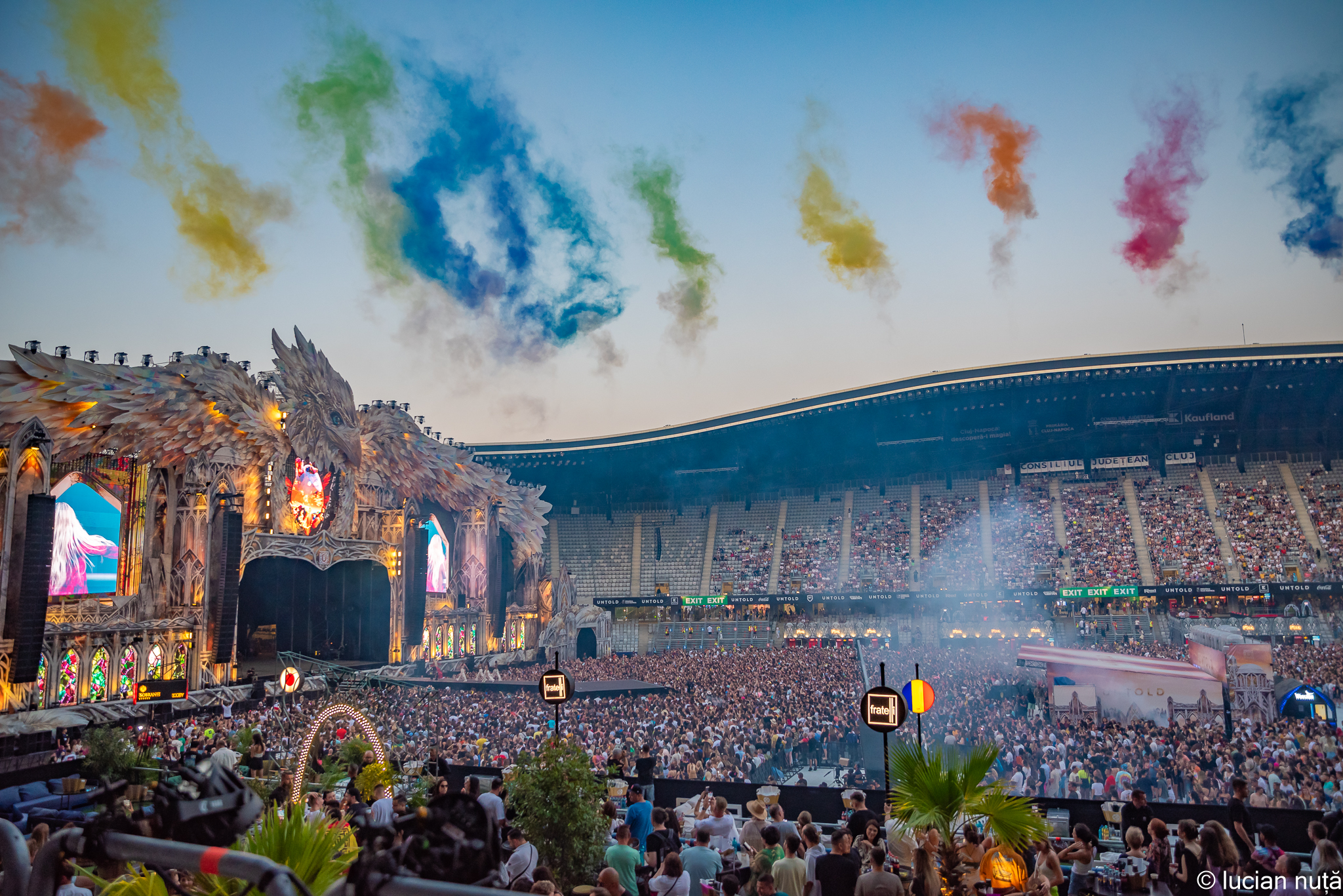
UNTOLD 2023 Main stage

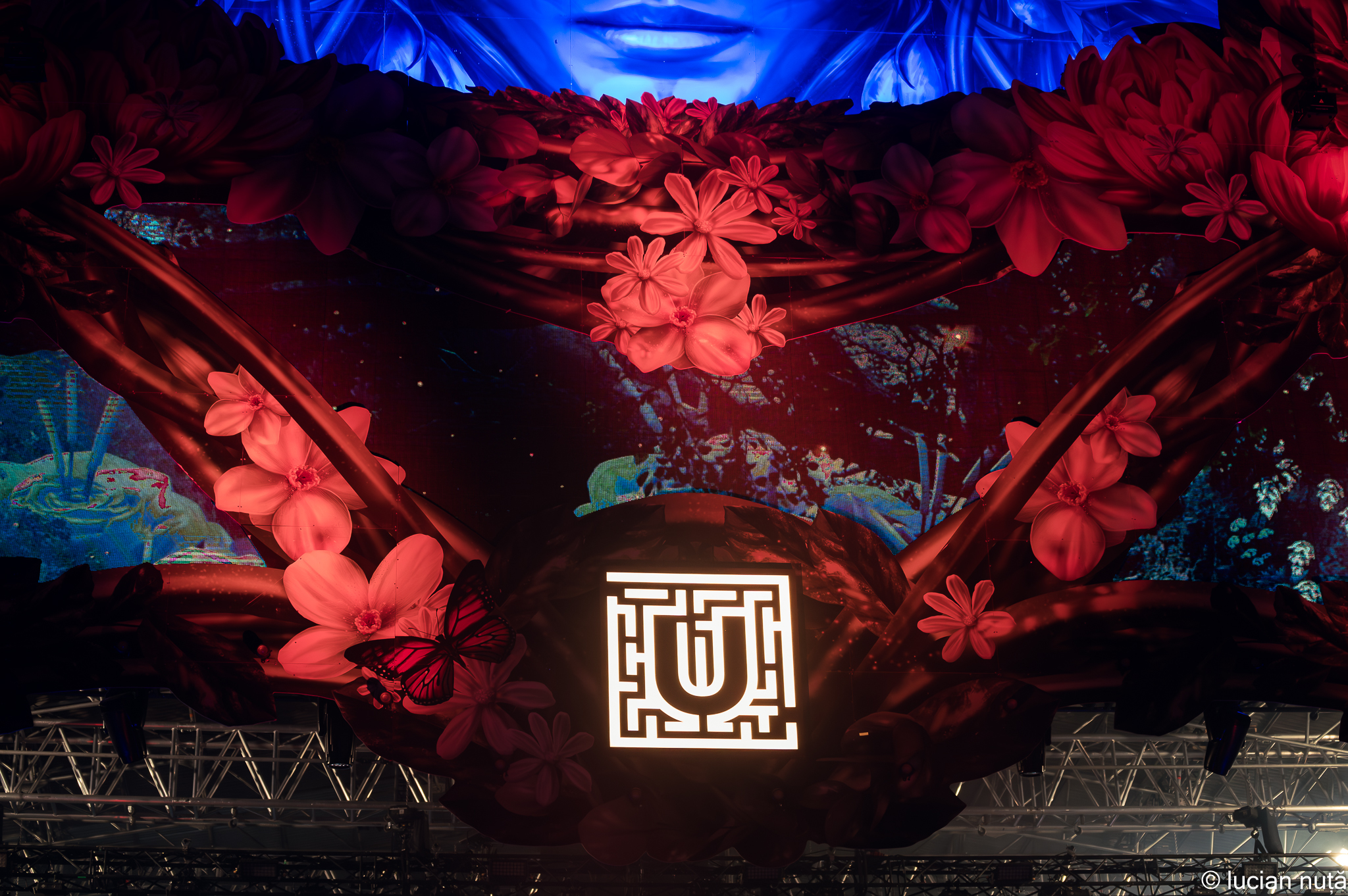
UNTOLD 2024 Main stage

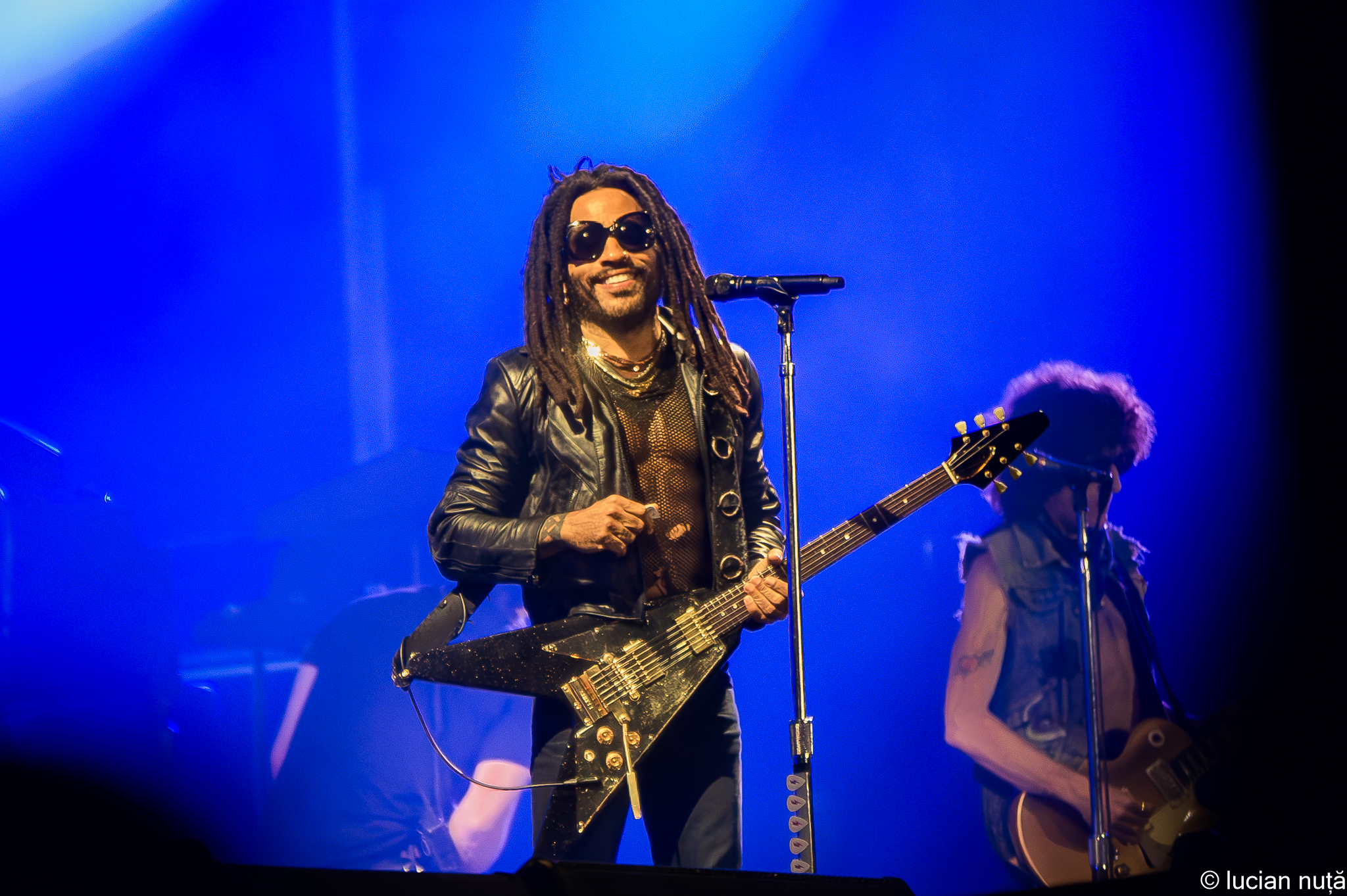
Lenny Kravitz at UNTOLD 2024

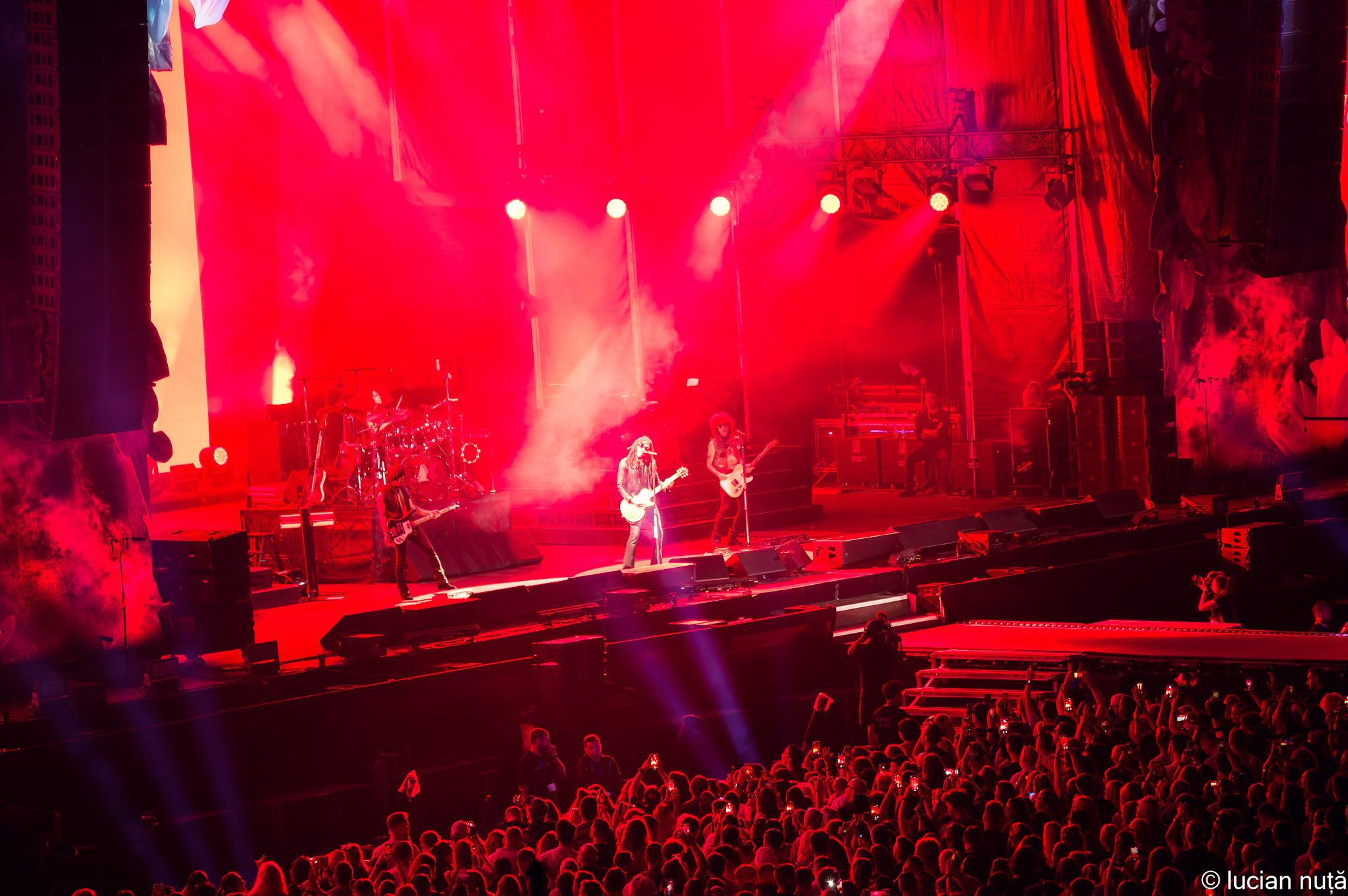
Lenny Kravitz at UNTOLD 2024

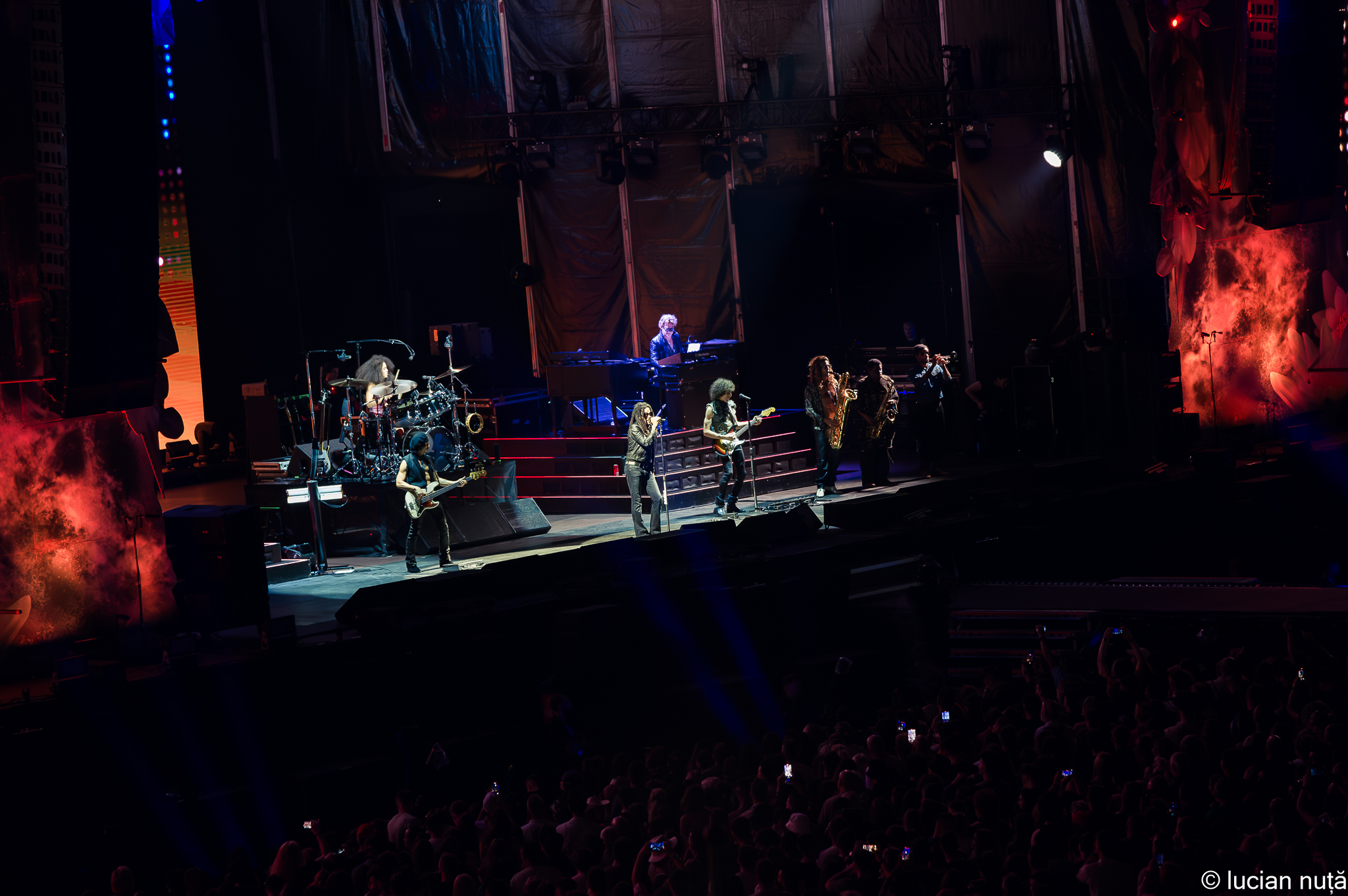
Lenny Kravitz at UNTOLD 2024

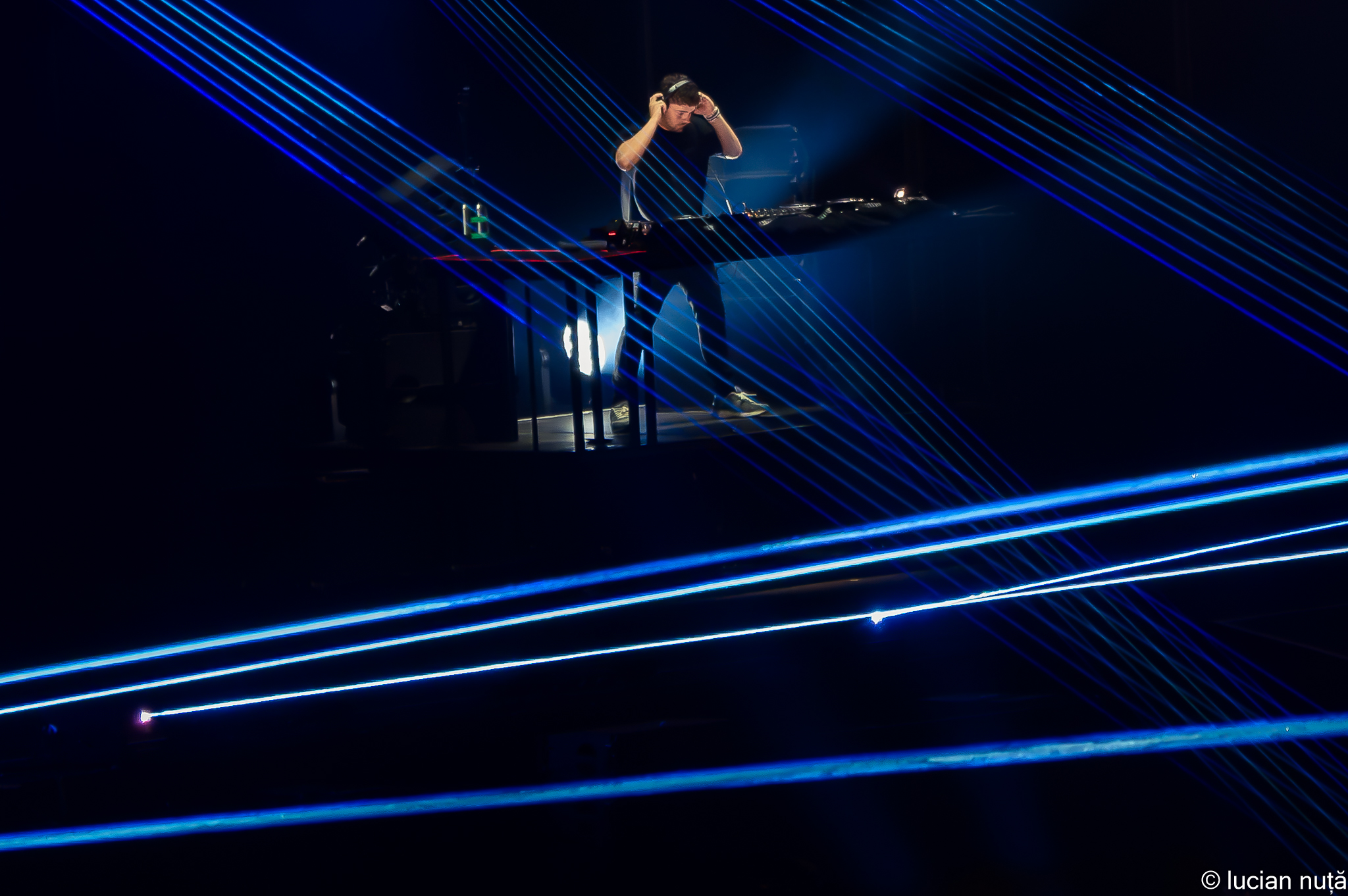
Martin Garrix at UNTOLD 2024

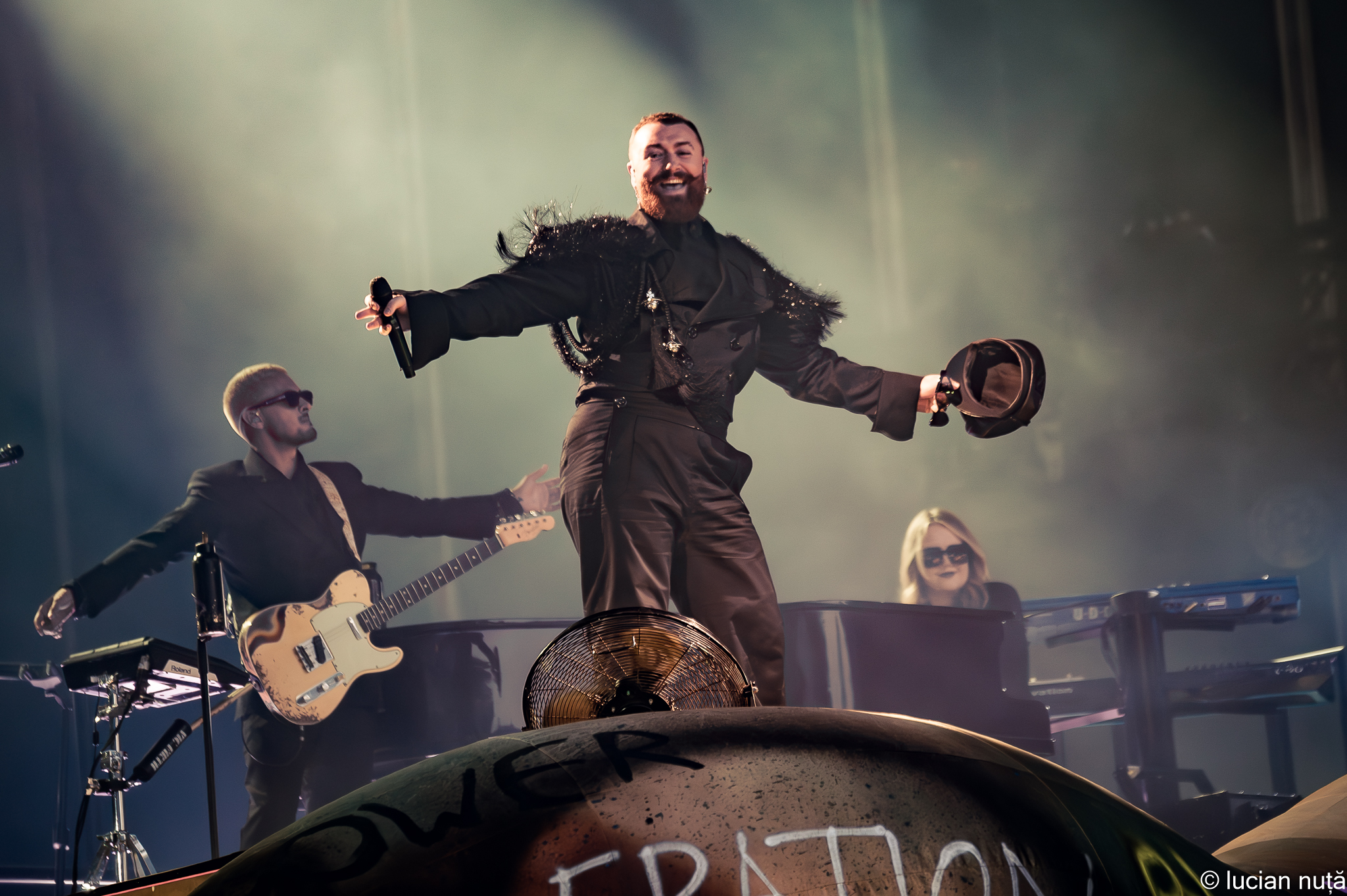
Sam Smith at UNTOLD 2024
