= Green Valley Lake =

Green Valley Lake may refer to:

- Green Valley Lake (Arizona)
- Green Valley Lake, California, an unincorporated community
- Green Valley Lake (Iowa)

== See also ==
- Green Valley (disambiguation)
