= Hï Ibiza =

Nightclub

- Address: Platja d'en Bossa, 07817, Balearic Islands
- Location: Ibiza, Spain
- Operator: The Night League
- Type: Music venue
- Event: Electronic dance music

Construction
- Opened: 2017

Website
- Official website

Hï Ibiza is a nightclub located in Playa d’en Bossa on the Spanish island of Ibiza. Hï Ibiza officially opened on 28 May 2017, on the site formerly occupied by Space Ibiza. The venue is operated by The Night League, which also manages nearby Ushuaïa Ibiza and [UNVRS].

The club is a multi-room venue, including the Theatre and Club Room, with each hosting a headline DJs. In 2025, Hï Ibiza revealed an in-club art gallery in collaboration with London-based W1 Curates.

Each season, Hï hosts DJ residencies which have included artists such as Black Coffee, CamelPhat, Dom Dolla, HUGEL, James Hype, MEDUZA and MESTIZA. In addition to branded nights, it has also hosted individual events, including BBC Radio 1's Dance Weekend.

In 2020, the club remained closed for the entire summer as a result of the COVID-19 pandemic. In recent years, Hï has received several major industry accolades, including being voted the #1 Club in the World for a record four consecutive years in the DJ Mag Top 100 Clubs from 2022 to in 2025.
