= DJ Mag =

British music magazine

DJ Magazine

- Cover of the May 2018 issue, featuring Alan Walker
- Managing Director: Heath Holmes, 2023–present
- Editor: Carl Loben, 2011–present
- Categories: Music, technology, nightlife, style
- Frequency: Quarterly
- Founded: 1991
- First issue: May 1991; 35 years ago
- Company: Thrust Publishing Ltd
- Country: UK
- Based in: London
- Language: English
- Website: djmag.com
- ISSN: 0951-5143

DJ Magazine (also known as DJ Mag) is a British magazine dedicated to electronic dance music and DJs. Founded in 1991, the magazine is (or was) adapted for distribution in the United Kingdom, the United States, Spain, France, Italy, Latin America, China, South Korea, Brunei, Indonesia, India, Sri Lanka, Oman, Saudi Arabia, United Arab Emirates, Germany, Canada, Russia, Belarus, and the Netherlands.

== History ==
An earlier version of the magazine appeared towards the end of the 1980s when it was then known as Disc Jockey Magazine. The name was then changed to Jocks Magazine, but the publication underwent re-branding shortly afterwards. After this process the first issue of DJ Magazine was launched in the middle of 1991; it was initially produced as weekly publication with Chris Mellor as its first editor. The magazine at this point was already the UK's top-selling disc jockey magazine and was widely regarded as one of the magazines of choice in the burgeoning house and rave music scenes.

The first edition featured artists such as Frankie Knuckles and the Ragga Twins. In 1992, the magazine decided to switch to bi-weekly publishing due to increasing workload which would remain in place till 2008. During its first two years the editorial staff of the magazine voted for their DJ of the Year: initially this was a short list, however this was later expanded to become a Top 100 list that first appeared in the magazine's 100th edition on 21 October 1993.

In 1994, the band Underworld featured on the cover due in part to their breakthrough album. Other artists featured that year included established names such as Armand van Helden, Erick Morillo, but also breakthrough DJs such as DJ Rap. By the summer of 1995, the magazine began to regularly feature Ibiza due its increasing popularity as a clubbing destination; the magazine also set-up stall at the Winter Music Conference held in Miami, United States. In 1997, the magazine featured new British house duo Basement Jaxx on its front page. Artists appearing on the cover of the magazine towards the end of the 1990s included Jeff Mills, Deep Dish, Orbital, Laurent Garnier, and Danny Tenaglia.

In 1999, the magazine would feature DJs on its front page exploring the rise of Trance Music. The publication wrote extensively about the use of drugs and their prevalence within the dance music scene.

Beginning in late 2000, the magazine launched its first pilot website. By November 2000, Highbury House Communications had bought Nexus, the magazine's publisher, and the magazine moved its editorial offices to Kentish Town, North London. In 2001 dance music journalist Lesley Wright, who was then editor of Scottish dance publication M8 magazine was hired to replace Chris Mellor as editor-in-chief after 10 years running the editorial staff.

In 2002, Fatboy Slim was featured in the July issue after his free event held in Brighton, England attracted approximately 250,000 clubbers. In 2003 the parent company of the publication merged with the magazine publisher WVIP. From 2005 the magazine started to expand its publication overseas to include places like Central and South America, Germany, France and Spain. In 2006 the magazine was sold to Future plc, one of the largest UK media companies. Since 2009 the title has been owned and operated by independent publishing company Thrust Publishing Ltd.

In 2011, the magazine was launched in the USA. After 10 years at the helm of the magazine, editor Lesley Wright left and was replaced by Carl Loben. In 2012, the publication switched production to a monthly format. The owners of the publication were looking to expand into new markets through licensing deals in the Middle East, Australia, India, Malaysia, Singapore, Vietnam, Japan and China.

In April 2016, the magazine unveiled its 25th anniversary cover on social media. The special issue celebrated 25 "pioneers" of dance music to commemorate the magazine's 25th anniversary. Artists featured on the cover included Daft Punk, Jeff Mills, Aphex Twin, and Goldie. The Fader criticized the cover for not featuring any women among the 25 artists.

In 2017, the format for the magazine included sections on dance music industry news, regular features, reviews covering clubs, EDM/dance music, technical equipment; it also included Top 100 lists as well as coverage of up and coming EDM events. DJ Mag runs a number of awards including its Top 100 DJ Poll, Top 100 Club Poll, Top 100 Festivals Poll, Best of British Awards and its Tech Awards (until 2018).

In 2025, DJ Mag’s iconic print edition was re-imagined as a premium quarterly edition with triple the previous shelf-life, triple the distribution, increased pagination and vastly improved paper quality.

== Components ==
DJ Magazine includes:

- DJ Mag – a print magazine featuring three cover stars per quarter, originally launched in 1991. It is currently published under licence by Thrust Publishing Ltd.
- djmag.com – the publications website launched in 2000.
- DJ Mag Ibiza – specialist printed magazine published in Ibiza Spain which has printed over 100,000 copies.
- Top 100 DJs Poll – the world's leading DJ poll, attracting a large number of voters per year and an estimated 10 million people viewing the result of the poll when published.
- Top 100 Clubs Poll – a poll to determine the best clubs in the world. The poll was originally only open only for DJs to vote on it, but it became free for the public to vote on in 2010.
- Top 100 Festivals Poll - a poll to determine the best festivals in the world.
- Best of British Awards – an annual poll recognising the magazine and its readers' favourite British artists, venues and platforms each year.

== Top 100 DJs ==
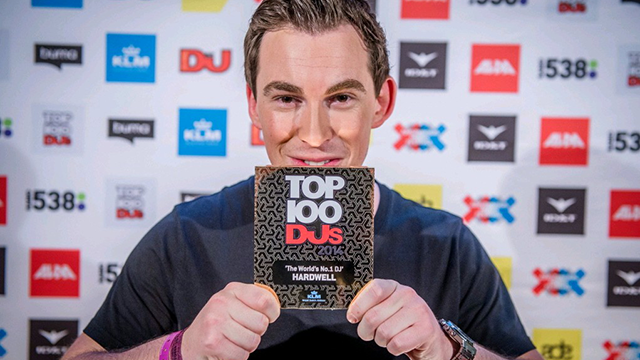
Hardwell holding his plaque after being crowned number one DJ in 2014.

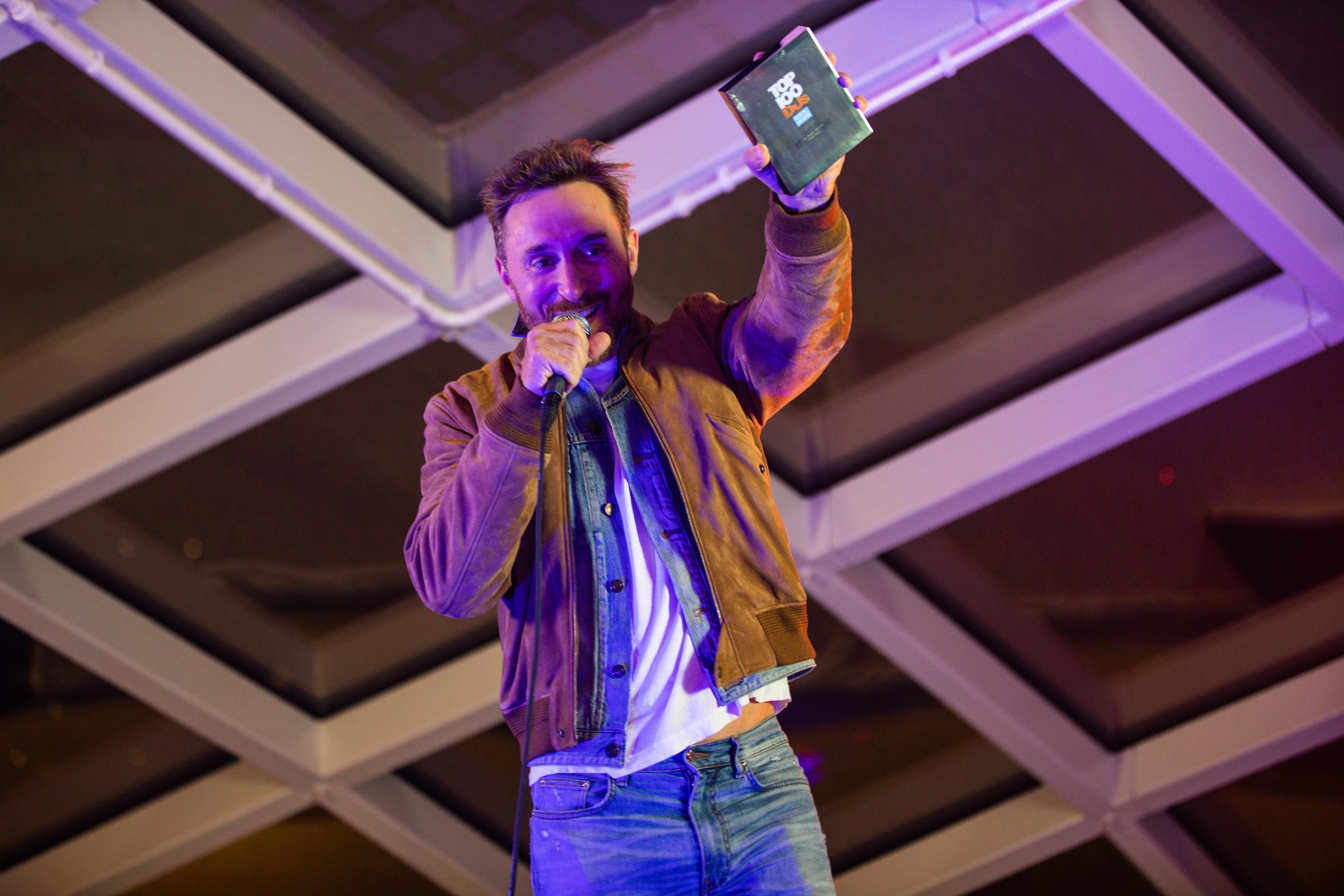
David Guetta being crowned number 1 DJ for the second time in 2020

The magazine's biggest property is a public poll of the world's 100 most popular DJs. The poll attracted over one million votes in 2015, making it the world's biggest music poll. Danny Rampling was the first to be named as the number one DJ in the world by the magazine's journalists in 1991. In 1992 Smokin Jo was named the number one DJ by the magazine editors and is the only female DJ to have ever earned the top ranking. In 1993 to celebrate the 100th edition of DJ Magazine, the magazine introduced a Top 100 list that was still compiled by its staff until 1996. For the previous five years, the system for nominee selection and voting to determine the winners was similar to that of current Grammy Awards and the Brit Awards in that dance music industry specialists (in this case music journalists) decided on who was nominated and who won the award. However, in 1997 the decision was taken by the publication to let the readers of the magazine decide who they thought was the world's top DJ, and in 1997 British DJ Carl Cox was the first winner of the Top 100 DJs Award by public vote. As of 2017, Fergie holds the record for the highest new entry in the poll's history, achieved when he placed 8th in 2000. Dutch DJs Armin van Buuren & Martin Garrix currently tie the record of most overall wins with five each.

The awards party for the poll was traditionally hosted at the Ministry of Sound nightclub in London. For the 2011 poll, the event was hosted outside of the UK for the first time in its history, being staged at the 2011's edition of the Amsterdam dance event. The 2012 and 2013 award shows were both held on 19 October at the same event. Up until 2002, the top three had consisted of at least one British DJ, since the next year (2003) at least two Dutch DJ's have featured in the top three. In 2015 the Top 100 DJs Awards Party took place as the headline moment of the Amsterdam Music Festival. Over 40,000 guests witnessed the crowning of 2015's winners Dimitri Vegas & Like Mike. Following the Amsterdam event, the winning DJs were flown to London, where they performed to a sold out Brixton Academy for the Top 100 DJs London show.

Top 100 DJs is considered to be hugely important to DJs as an influencer of booking fees and their current level of popularity. DJs regularly campaign for votes, a process which is allowed by the magazine. Dutch DJ Hardwell once did a skydive as part of his campaign video; David Guetta regularly creates animated videos as part of his voting campaign; Dimitri Vegas & Like Mike released an exclusive mix to their fans as part of their 2015 campaign.

For the 2025 poll, the event took place for the first time in Ibiza, at the new super club UNVRS.

=== Criticisms ===
Top 100 DJs has been criticised as being heavily influenced by the marketing power of DJs, rather than their skill or ability. An article that appeared on the US section of the Huffington Post in July 2013, entitled "DJMag Top 100 (Marketable) DJs", explores this claim. Its author, Kevin Yu, stated that "Over the past few years, DJ Mag has been criticized that the list is not a true representation of their skills, but instead the amount of money they can put towards marketing". Yu asked, "Has the DJMag list transformed into a popularity contest or is it still a resemblance of the DJs talent?".

The list has also been criticised for not including a more balanced reflection of artists from other electronic dance music styles and showing rankings based on less commercial mainstream DJs. A feature in The Guardian in 2010 by the journalist Ben Child entitled "What does DJ Mag's top 100 poll tell us about UK dance music? Not much" explores this further, noting that:

What's surprising, at least to those of us who don't enjoy the more mainstream genres, is the paucity of artists from outside the house and trance scenes in the top 100. This has pretty much always been the case, with the odd Drum 'N' Bass or Breakbeat acts occasionally making it into the lower reaches in years gone by, but this year's situation is particularly extreme. There is just one artist Andy C whose music is not based on the standard four-to-the-floor beat pattern adopted by mainstream dance music in the top 100 – and he has been around for more than a decade and a half.

Avatar of Laidback Luke

Laidback Luke
(@LaidbackLuke)
tweeted:

I've always been a fan of the list, but it's grown to be a monster. I don't care about my position, I don't need them. But from the many fellow DJs that I know throw money at them (or else…), to the ones that hacked the system. It is what it is now.

December 20, 2017

In December 2017, Dutch DJ Laidback Luke took to Twitter to lash out at DJ Mag for not including him in their Top 100 DJs list due to a controversial video blog post in which he spoke out against the voting process, claiming that DJ Mag's polls were "rigged". In 2019, fellow Dutch DJ Martin Garrix said in an interview with the Dutch newspaper Het Parool that he "I really don't care" about the vote, going further to say that he would never take part in any campaigns to vote for the contest and even suggested that he would seek to abolish the list.

In 2021, fans expressed their displeasure with the ranking by promoting a fake DJ in the DJ Mag Top 100 list.

=== Results ===
DJ Magazine's Top 100 DJs is an annual poll run by DJ Magazine to decide the world's number one DJ. The poll started in 1991 and for first two years the magazine's journalists selected their top 100 DJs of the year. 1993 saw the poll expand to a top 100 poll where the journalists would decide their top 100 DJs in the world. In 1997, the magazine opened the top 100 list to a public vote which has remained the used format to this day.

==== 1991–1996 ====
Top 3 DJs – Voted by DJ Magazine
| Year | 1st | 2nd | 3rd |
| 1991 | Danny Rampling | Graeme Park | Mike Pickering |
| 1992 | Smokin Jo | unknown | unknown |
| 1993 | Aba Shanti-I | Alfredo | Stu Allan |
| 1994 | unknown | unknown | unknown |
| 1995 | Carl Cox | Sasha | Paul Oakenfold |
| 1996 | unknown | unknown | unknown |

==== 1997–present ====
Top 5 DJs – Voted publicly through magazine
| Year | 1st | 2nd | 3rd | 4th | 5th | Ref. |
| 1997 | Carl Cox | Paul Oakenfold | Sasha | Judge Jules | Tony De Vit | |
| 1998 | Paul Oakenfold | Carl Cox | Judge Jules | Pete Tong | Sasha | |
| 1999 | Paul Oakenfold | Carl Cox | Sasha | Judge Jules | Paul van Dyk | |
| 2000 | Sasha | Paul Oakenfold | John Digweed | Paul van Dyk | Carl Cox | |
| 2001 | John Digweed | Sasha | Danny Tenaglia | Paul van Dyk | Paul Oakenfold | |
Top 5 DJs – Online Voting
| 2002 | Tiësto | Sasha | John Digweed | Paul van Dyk | Armin van Buuren | |
| 2003 | Tiësto | Paul van Dyk | Armin van Buuren | Sasha | John Digweed | |
| 2004 | Tiësto | Paul van Dyk | Armin van Buuren | Sasha | Ferry Corsten | |
| 2005 | Paul van Dyk | Tiësto | Armin van Buuren | Sasha | Ferry Corsten | |
| 2006 | Paul van Dyk | Armin van Buuren | Tiësto | Christopher Lawrence | DJ Dan | |
| 2007 | Armin van Buuren | Tiësto | John Digweed | Paul van Dyk | Sasha | |
| 2008 | Armin van Buuren | Tiësto | Paul van Dyk | Above & Beyond | David Guetta | |
| 2009 | Armin van Buuren | Tiësto | David Guetta | Above & Beyond | Paul van Dyk | |
| 2010 | Armin van Buuren | David Guetta | Tiësto | deadmau5 | Above & Beyond | |
| 2011 | David Guetta | Armin van Buuren | Tiësto | deadmau5 | Above & Beyond | |
| 2012 | Armin van Buuren | Tiësto | Avicii | David Guetta | deadmau5 | |
| 2013 | Hardwell | Armin van Buuren | Avicii | Tiësto | David Guetta | |
| 2014 | Hardwell | Dimitri Vegas & Like Mike | Armin van Buuren | Martin Garrix | Tiësto | |
| 2015 | Dimitri Vegas & Like Mike | Hardwell | Martin Garrix | Armin van Buuren | Tiësto | |
| 2016 | Martin Garrix | Dimitri Vegas & Like Mike | Hardwell | Armin van Buuren | Tiësto | |
| 2017 | Martin Garrix | Dimitri Vegas & Like Mike | Armin van Buuren | Hardwell | Tiësto | |
| 2018 | Martin Garrix | Dimitri Vegas & Like Mike | Hardwell | Armin van Buuren | David Guetta | |
| 2019 | Dimitri Vegas & Like Mike | Martin Garrix | David Guetta | Armin van Buuren | Marshmello | |
| 2020 | David Guetta | Dimitri Vegas & Like Mike | Martin Garrix | Armin van Buuren | Alok | |
| 2021 | David Guetta | Martin Garrix | Armin van Buuren | Alok | Dimitri Vegas & Like Mike | |
| 2022 | Martin Garrix | David Guetta | Dimitri Vegas & Like Mike | Alok | Armin van Buuren | |
| 2023 | David Guetta | Dimitri Vegas & Like Mike | Martin Garrix | Alok | Armin van Buuren | |
| 2024 | Martin Garrix | David Guetta | Dimitri Vegas & Like Mike | Alok | Timmy Trumpet | |
| 2025 | David Guetta | Martin Garrix | Alok | Dimitri Vegas & Like Mike | Armin van Buuren | |
| 2026 | David Guetta | Martin Garrix | Anyma | Alok | Dimitri Vegas & Like Mike | |

=== Statistics ===
Most years voted as number one DJ
| DJ | Years |
|---|---|
| David Guetta | 6 |
| Martin Garrix | 5 |
| Armin van Buuren | 5 |
| Tiësto | 3 |
| Paul van Dyk | 2 |
| Paul Oakenfold | 2 |
| Carl Cox | 2 |
| Hardwell | 2 |
| Dimitri Vegas & Like Mike | 2 |
| Sasha | 1 |
| John Digweed | 1 |
| Judge Jules | 1 |
| Danny Rampling | 1 |
| Smokin Jo | 1 |
| Aba Shanti-I | 1 |

== Top 100 Clubs ==
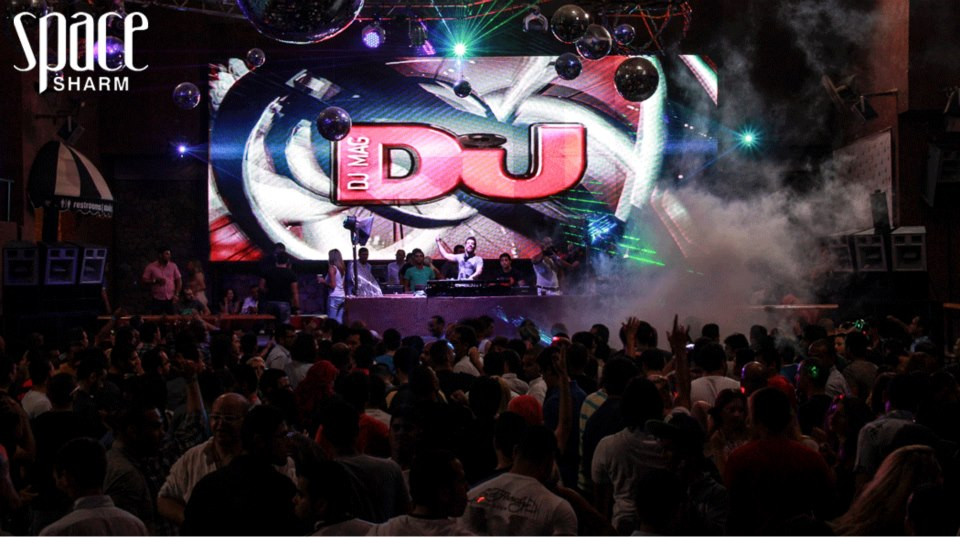
DJ Mag on their 2013 Top 100 Clubs tour at Space Sharm, Sharm El Sheikh, Egypt.

DJ Magazine also runs an annual poll called Top 100 Clubs (Top 50 Clubs in 2006 and 2007) used to decide the world's number one club, which began in 2006. Initially, the voting was done by the world's biggest DJs. Since 2010, the voting is decided by the public. The 2021 poll was postponed from its usual dates in March to August due to the COVID-19 pandemic. The 2022 vote was also delayed due to the COVID-19 pandemic, however only to May in this instance. DJ Mag announced that the poll would return to normal rules as in 2021 club scenes outside of the previous 12 months could be considered aimed many closures due to the pandemic.

=== Results ===
DJ Mag top Clubs
| Year | 1st | 2nd | 3rd | 4th | 5th | Ref. |
| 2006 | Fabric | The End | Turnmills | Pacha | Space | |
| 2007 | Space | Fabric | Pacha | The End | Warung | |
| 2008 | Fabric | Space Ibiza | Amnesia | The End | WOMB | |
| 2009 | Berghain | Fabric | Space Ibiza | WOMB | Amnesia | |
| 2010 | Sankeys MCR | Fabric | Amnesia | Ministry Of Sound | Pacha Ibiza | |
| 2011 | Space Ibiza | Fabrik | Green Valley | Amnesia | Pacha Ibiza | |
| 2012 | Space Ibiza | Green Valley | Pacha Ibiza | Fabrik | Zouk Singapore | |
| 2013 | Green Valley | Space Ibiza | Pacha Ibiza | Fabric | Zouk Singapore | |
| 2014 | Space Ibiza | Green Valley | Pacha Ibiza | Fabric | BCM Planet Dance | |
| 2015 | Green Valley | Space Ibiza | Hakkasan | Pacha Ibiza | Amnesia | |
| 2016 | Space Ibiza | Green Valley | Amnesia | Pacha Ibiza | Octagon | |
| 2017 | Space Ibiza | Fabric | Green Valley | Zouk Singapore | Octagon | |
| 2018 | Green Valley | Ushuaïa Ibiza | Zouk Singapore | Echostage | Hï Ibiza | |
| 2019 | Green Valley | Echostage | Ushuaïa Ibiza | Hï Ibiza | Zouk Singapore | |
| 2020 | Green Valley | Hï Ibiza | Echostage | Ushuaïa Ibiza | Printworks London | |
| 2021 | Echostage | Green Valley | Hï Ibiza | Ushuaïa Ibiza | Bootshaus | |
| 2022 | Hï Ibiza | Echostage | Green Valley | Printworks London | Bootshaus | |
| 2023 | Hï Ibiza | Printworks London | Green Valley | Echostage | Ushuaïa Ibiza | |
| 2024 | Hï Ibiza | Green Valley | Echostage | Ushuaïa Ibiza | Bootshaus | |
| 2025 | Hï Ibiza | Green Valley | Ushuaïa Ibiza | The Warehouse Project at Depot Mayfield | Echostage | |
| 2026 | UNVRS | Green Valley | Ushuaïa Ibiza | Hï Ibiza | Savaya | |

=== Statistics ===
Most years voted as number one club
| Club | Years |
|---|---|
| Space | 6 |
| Green Valley | 5 |
| Hï Ibiza | 4 |
| Fabric | 2 |
| Berghain | 1 |
| Echostage | 1 |
| Sankeys MCR | 1 |
| UNVRS | 1 |

...by city
| Club | Years |
|---|---|
| Ibiza | 11 |
| Camboriú | 5 |
| London | 2 |
| Berlin | 1 |
| Manchester | 1 |
| Washington D.C. | 1 |

== Top 100 Festivals ==
Since 2015, the voters of the DJ Magazine's top 100 clubs have also voted on the world's number one festival. No poll was held in 2018. In 2019, the DJs themselves voted on their favourite festival in a top 50 format similar to the DJ and club poll run by the magazine. In 2020, the format was changed to a 20% DJ vote and 80% public vote, and was increased to a top 100 format, however results were never published. 2021 had no poll with the poll returning in 2022 but in October as opposed to February which it had been in previous years. The 2022 results were chosen entirely by DJ Mag readers. It was also confirmed ahead of the 2022 poll that 2020 and 2021 did not occur due to the COVID-19 pandemic, despite the 2020 results being collected before the pandemic started.

=== Results ===
==== 2015–2017 ====
| Year | Winner | Ref. |
|---|---|---|
| 2015 | Tomorrowland | |
| 2016 | Ultra Music Festival | |
| 2017 | Ultra Music Festival | |

==== 2019–present ====
| Year | 1st | 2nd | 3rd | 4th | 5th | Ref. |
|---|---|---|---|---|---|---|
| 2019 | Tomorrowland | Glastonbury | Ultra Music Festival | Awakenings | Sónar | |
| 2020 | Voting opened; results never published | | | | | |
| 2021 | No poll; cancelled due to the COVID-19 pandemic | | | | | |
| 2022 | Tomorrowland | Ultra Music Festival | Electric Daisy Carnival | Creamfields | Exit | |
| 2023 | Tomorrowland | Ultra Music Festival | Glastonbury | Electric Daisy Carnival | Coachella | |
| 2024 | Tomorrowland | Electric Daisy Carnival | Untold Festival | Ultra Music Festival | Creamfields | |
| 2025 | Tomorrowland | Ultra Music Festival | Untold Festival | Electric Daisy Carnival | Glastonbury | |
| 2026 | Tomorrowland | Electric Daisy Carnival | Untold Festival | Ultra Music Festival | Defqon.1 | |

=== Statistics ===
Most years voted as number one festival
| Festival | Years |
|---|---|
| Tomorrowland | 7 |
| Ultra Music Festival | 2 |

== Best of British Awards ==
The Best of British Awards was launched by DJ Mag in 2007 to celebrate dance music talent and platforms within Great Britain.

== Charitable partnerships ==
DJ Mag has supported charitable organisations through its annual polls and awards. UNICEF UK was the official charity partner of Top 100 DJs for six consecutive years from 2017 to 2022. Fundraising activities included donations during voting, memorabilia auctions, prize draws and livestreamed festivals. By 2021, DJ Mag reported that the partnership had raised more than £90,000. UNICEF UK reported that DJ Mag raised £6,000 for its COVAX/VaccinAid campaign through Crowdfunder that year.

The Best of British Awards partnered with music therapy charity Nordoff and Robbins in 2019 and with Youth Music between 2021 and 2023. The Youth Music partnership donated proceeds from merchandise, ticket sales and booking fees; the 2023 event raised £2,317 for the charity's grassroots projects.

In 2025, the Top 100 DJs campaign partnered with the South African non-profit Bridges for Music. Artists appearing in the poll were invited to sponsor students at the organisation's academy in Langa, Cape Town. Forty-two artists donated a combined £170,832, which DJ Mag said would fund programme places for 170 young people.

== Awards for DJ Mag ==
=== DJ Awards ===
The DJ Awards organises the annual electronic music DJ awards event. It is the only international ceremony for DJs and also the oldest, held once a year at Pacha club in Ibiza, Spain. It is one of the most important accolades.

| Year | Category | Work | Result | Ref. |
|---|---|---|---|---|
| 2005 | Outstanding Dedication Award | DJ Magazine | Won | |

=== International Dance Music Awards ===
The IDMAs is a major event which is part of the Winter Music Conference, a weeklong electronic music conference, held every March since 1985 in Miami Beach, Florida, United States. DJ Magazine has won the award for Best Music Publication 14 times, winning every year this category has been awarded.

| Year | Category | Work | Result | Ref. |
|---|---|---|---|---|
| 2003 | Best Dance Music Publication | DJ Magazine | Won | |
| 2004 | Best Dance Music Publication | DJ Magazine | Won | |
| 2005 | Best Dance Music Publication | DJ Magazine | Won | |
| 2006 | Best Dance Music Publication | DJ Magazine | Won | |
| 2007 | Best Music Publication | DJ Magazine | Won | |
| 2008 | Best Music Publication | DJ Magazine | Won | |
| 2009 | Best Music Publication | DJ Magazine | Won | |
| 2010 | Best Music Publication | DJ Magazine | Won | |
| 2011 | Best Music Publication | DJ Magazine | Won | |
| 2012 | Best Music Media Resource | DJ Magazine | Won | |
| 2013 | Best Music Media Resource | DJ Magazine | Won | |
| 2014 | Best Music Media Resource | DJ Magazine | Won | |
| 2015 | Best Music Media Resource | DJ Magazine | Won | |
| 2016 | Best Music Media Resource | DJ Magazine | Won | |

== See also ==
- DJ Awards
- IDMAs
- Mixmag
