= Greendell =

Greendell may refer to:

- Greendell station (Delaware, Lackawanna and Western Railroad), Green Township, New Jersey, USA
- Greendell, New Jersey, an unincorporated community in Green Township, Sussex County; in USA.
- Greendell Elementary School, Palo Alto, California, USA; part of the Palo Alto Unified School District

== See also ==
- Greendale (disambiguation)
- Greenvale (disambiguation)
- Green Valley (disambiguation)
