= Val Verde =

Val Verde may refer to:

- Val Verde, California, a community in Los Angeles County
- Val Verde (Montecito, California), estate in Santa Barbara County, listed on National Register of Historic Places
- Val Verde, Texas
- Val Verde Park, Texas
- Val Verde County, Texas
- Val Verde, New Mexico
  - Battle of Valverde or Val Verde, an American Civil War battle in New Mexico Territory
- Val Verde (fictional country), Spanish-speaking country resembling Panama that appeared in a number of films and television programs
- Val Verde Unified School District in Moreno Valley, California and Perris, California
- Val Verde High School in Perris, California, USA

== See also ==
- Valverde (disambiguation)
- Verde (disambiguation)
- Val (disambiguation)
