= Greendale =

Greendale may refer to:

== Places ==
=== Australia ===
- Greendale, New South Wales, a suburb of Sydney
- Greendale, Victoria

=== Canada ===
- Greendale, Chilliwack, British Columbia
- Greendale Subdivision, Alberta

=== Ireland ===
- Greendale Community School, Kilbarrack, Dublin

=== New Zealand ===
- Greendale, New Zealand

=== Singapore ===
- Greendale Secondary School, a secondary school in Punggol

=== United Kingdom ===
- Greendale, Cheshire, a location in the U.K.

=== United States ===
- Greendale, Indiana, a city in southeast Indiana
- Greendale, Fort Wayne, Indiana, a neighborhood in Fort Wayne
- Greendale, Missouri
- Greendale, Ohio
- Greendale, Wisconsin, a southern suburb of Milwaukee
  - Greendale High School
- Greendale, a village located in northern Worcester, Massachusetts
  - Greendale Mall, in the village
- Greendale Township, Michigan

=== Zimbabwe ===
- Greendale, Harare, a suburb of Harare

=== Fictional places ===
- Greendale, the setting for the comic strip Sabrina the Teenage Witch
- Greendale, the setting for the British children's television series Postman Pat
- Greendale, the setting for the 1985 film Better Off Dead
- Greendale, Colorado, the setting for the American television comedy series Community, 2009–2016
  - Greendale Community College, the series' titular community college
- Greendale, the setting for the stories sung by Neil Young in the concept album of same name

== Other ==
- Greendale (album), an album and a movie, both made in 2003, by Neil Young and Crazy Horse

== See also ==
- Green Valley (disambiguation)
- Greenvale (disambiguation)
- Greendell (disambiguation)
- Grønnedal, Danish placenames sometimes Anglicized as "Greendale"
