= Greenvale =

Greenvale may refer to

== In Australia ==
- Greenvale, Victoria, a suburb of Melbourne, Australia
  - Greenvale Football Club
- Greenvale, New South Wales, a rural community in the Riverina
- Greenvale, Queensland, town and former nickel mining community, located on the Lynd Highway north of Charters Towers, Queensland

== In Canada ==
- Greenvale, Prince Edward Island

== In the United States ==
- Greenvale, New York, on Long Island
  - Greenvale (LIRR station)
- Greenvale, Tennessee
- Greenvale Township, Dakota County, Minnesota
- Greenvale, a home on the National Register of Historic Places, located in Long Beach, Mississippi

== In fiction ==
- Greenvale is a fictional small town in the video game Deadly Premonition

== See also ==
- Green Valley (disambiguation)
- Greendale (disambiguation)
- Greendell (disambiguation)
