= Valverde =

Valverde may refer to:

== People ==
- Valverde (surname)

== Places ==
=== Dominican Republic ===
- Valverde Province, a province in the northwest.

=== Italy ===
- Valverde, Lombardy, a commune in the Province of Pavia, in the region of Lombardy
- Valverde, Bergamo, a quarter in the city of Bergamo, in the region of Lombardy
- Valverde, Sicily, a commune in the Province of Catania, island of Sicily
- Valverde, Emilia Romagna, a frazione of Cesenatico in the province of Forlì-Cesena

=== Portugal ===
- Valverde (Aguiar da Beira), a former civil parish in the municipality of Aguiar da Beira
- Valverde (Alfãndega da Fé), a civil parish in the municipality of Alfândega da Fé
- Valverde (Fundão), a civil parish in the municipality of Fundão
- Valverde (Mirandela), a civil parish in the municipality of Mirandela
- Mogadouro, Valverde, Vale de Porco e Vilar de Rei, a civil parish in the municipality of Mogadouro
- Valverde, Viseu, a village in the municipality of Tondela

=== Spain ===
- Valverde del Camino, a municipality in the province of Huelva, Andalusia
- Valverde de Alcalá, a municipality in the Autonomous community of Madrid
- Valverde (Madrid), a ward of Fuencarral-El Pardo district, Madrid
- Valverde de Leganés, a municipality in the province of Badajoz
- Valverde de Mérida, a municipality in the province of Badajoz
- Valverde del Fresno, a municipality in the province of Cáceres
- Valverde de Júcar, a municipality in the province of Cuenca
- Valverde, Aragon, a village in the municipality of Calamocha, Province of Teruel
- Valverde, La Rioja, a village in the municipality of Cervera del Río Alhama, Province of La Rioja, Spain
- Valverde, Santa Cruz de Tenerife, a municipality on the island of El Hierro, Canary Islands
- Valverde-Enrique, a municipality in the province of León

=== United States ===
- Valverde, Denver, a neighborhood in the City and County of Denver, Colorado
- Valverde, New Mexico, a former Spanish settlement that gave its name to the nearby site of the Battle of Valverde during the American Civil War

== See also ==
- Green Valley (disambiguation)
- Val Verde (disambiguation)
- Verde (disambiguation)
- Val (disambiguation)
