= TV Verde Vale =

- Juazeiro do Norte, Ceará; Brazil
- Channels: Digital: 46 (UHF); Virtual: 13

Programming
- Affiliations: [NGT] 2006 - 2017 [TV Cultura] - 2025

Ownership
- Owner: Fundação 15 de Agosto

History
- First air date: September 2006
- Former channel numbers: Analog: 13 (VHF, 2006–2017)

Technical information
- Licensing authority: ANATEL

TV Verde Vale (channel 13) is a television station licensed to Juazeiro do Norte, Ceará, Brazil, affiliated with TV Cultura. The station operates under an educational license, being owned by Fundação 15 de Agosto, of politician, doctor and businessman Manoel Salviano Sobrinho, who used to own Rádio Verde Vale.

== History ==
Fundação 15 de Agosto was given an educational station license by the then-president Fernando Henrique Cardoso published on Diário Oficial da União on October 25, 2001. The act went past the National Congress and was approved on June 13, 2002, by the Federal Senate. On June 7, 2004, a decree from the Secretariat of Electronic Communication Services of the Ministry of Communications authorized the concession of VHF channel 13 VHF in Juazeiro do Norte for the institution and installation of its equipment.

TV Verde Vale launched its programming in September 2006, interspersing its local output with relays of Nova Geração de Televisão (NGT), a network with an educational license operating in the states of São Paulo and Rio de Janeiro. Its 5kW transmitter was installed in the Horto neighborhood.

On March 2, 2017, TV Verde Vale was authorized to broadcast a digital signal on UHF channel 46 following the publication of an order from the Department of Commercial Broadcasting of the Ministry of Science, Technology, Innovations and Communications on Diário Oficial da União, initiating its operation on May 11. In June of the same year, it replaced NGT with TV Cultura and shut down its analog signal on September 28.
