= Greendale, Ohio =

Unincorporated community in Ohio, U.S.

Coordinates: 39°32′31″N 82°16′32″W

Greendale is an unincorporated community in Hocking County, in the U.S. state of Ohio.

== History ==
A post office was established at Greendale in 1879, and remained in operation until 1939.
