= Mestiza (DJs) =

Spanish musical duo

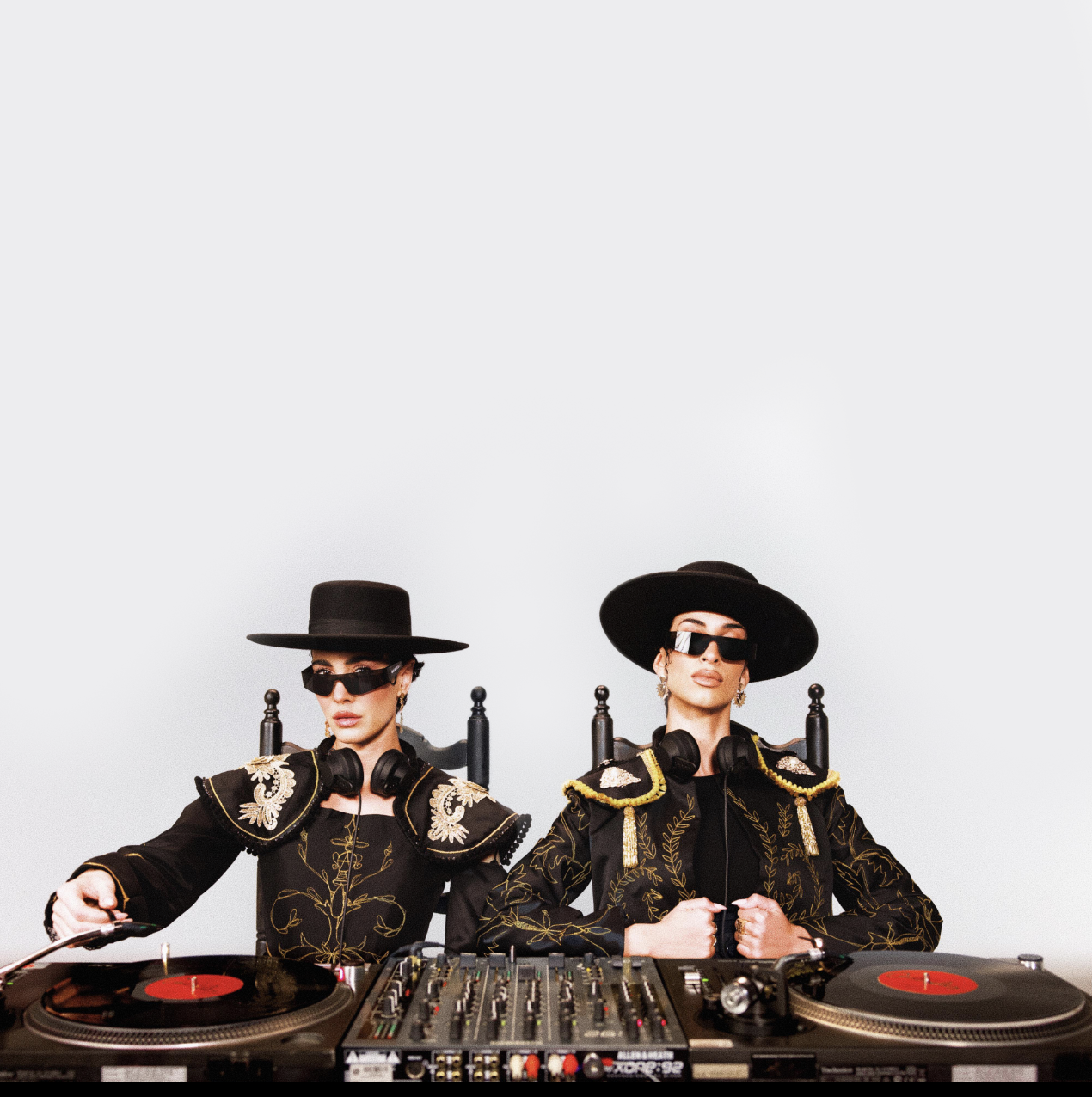

Background information
- Origin: Spain
- Genres: House, Afro house, Electronic, Melodic Techno
- Label: Sacro Music
- Website: mestiza.es

Mestiza is a Spanish DJ and producer duo recognized for combining electronic music with flamenco influences. Formed in 2021, their music has been recognized for celebrating Spanish cultural heritage and femininity in the club scene, earning them coverage in major publications such as El País, El Mundo, Rolling Stone, and DJ Mag.

== Career ==
After over a decade of individual careers in the electronic scene, the two artists joined forces in 2021 to explore their shared musical roots under the name Mestiza. Their style fuses club beats with flamenco instrumentation, often referencing Spanish folklore and iconography in both their music and visual identity. In December 2023, they released their debut album Quëreles under their independent label Sacro Music, which received praise for its bold reimagining of flamenco tradition through a club lens. The album also reached number 1 on Spain’s official vinyl sales chart.

Since their formation, the duo have performed at prominent clubs and festivals, and in 2025 became the first female DJ duo to debut with a residency at Hï Ibiza.

== Discography ==
=== LPs ===
- Quëreles (2023)
- Spanish Chica (2026)

=== Singles ===
- El Brillo (2021)
- Origen (2023)
- Mis Ojos. with Chambao (2023)
- Reina la Alegría (2023)
- Báilame (2024)
- Yalili (2025)
- Enamorá with Tayllor (2025)
- Asereje remix with Las Ketchup (2025)
- Rintintin (2025)
- El Homenaje (2025)
- Campanera with Faul & Wad and Diana Navarro (2025)
- Que Calor, Que Calor (2026)
- Salam (2026)
