= Visualizing Energy Resources Dynamically on the Earth =

DOE energy visualization

VERDE (Visualizing Energy Resources Dynamically on the Earth) is a visualization and analysis capability of the United States Department of Energy (DOE). The system, developed and maintained by Oak Ridge National Laboratory (ORNL), provides wide-area situational understanding of the U.S. electric grid. Enabling grid monitoring, weather impacts prediction and analysis, VERDE supports preparedness and response to potentially large outage events. As a real-time geo-visualization capability, it characterizes the dynamic behavior of the grid over interconnects giving views into bulk transmission lines as well as county-level power distribution status. By correlating grid behaviors with cyber events, the platform also enables a method to link cyber-to-infrastructure dependencies.

VERDE integrates different data elements from other available on-line services, databases, and social media. The Tennessee Valley Authority (TVA) and other major utilities spanning multiple regions across the electric grid interconnection provide real-time status of their systems. Social media sources such as Twitter provide additional data-sources for visualization and analyses.

The VERDE software, which was developed by the Computational Sciences and Engineering Division (CSED) of ORNL, is used outside of the DOE for a number of related national security requirements.
