= Green Valley (club) =

Nightclub in Camboriú, Brazil

Green Valley is a nightclub in Camboriú, Brazil. It was founded in 2007 as a large tent-based party on a jungle-based airfield, but has since grown into "a festival-sized jungle club", and is known for its incorporation of the Brazilian rainforest into its establishment.

In 2012 it first made the top three nightclubs in the world as ranked by DJ Mag, coming it at number three. Starting in 2013, it has since been named the #1 nightclub in the world by the magazine five times, including in 2020 - the second most of any nightclub in the magazine ranking's history. The years in which it was ranked number one include 2013, 2015, 2018, 2019, and the aforementioned 2020, when it was named to the Top 3 clubs in the world for the tenth consecutive year.

In June 2020, the club was partially destroyed by the 2020 "bomb" cyclone. Following the disaster, management of the club stated they were uncertain if the nightclub would return due to the extent of the damages.

== Awards and nominations ==
=== DJ Magazine's top 100 Clubs ===
Green Valley has been recognized as one of the top 3 clubs in the world by DJ Magazine every year since 2011. The club's five #1 rankings are second-most in the magazine's history, trailing only Space nightclub in Ibiza, Spain (now known as Hï Ibiza).

Year	Position	Notes	Ref.
2010	27	New Entry	
2011	3	—	
2012	2	—	
2013	1	—	
2014	2	—	
2015	1	—	
2016	2	—	
2017	3	—	
2018	1	—	
2019	1	—	
2020	1	—	
2021	2	—	
2022	3	—	
2023	3	—	
2024	2	—	
