= Green Valley Lake (Arizona) =

Waterbody in Gila County, Arizona

- Location within Arizona Location within the United States
- Location: Gila County, Arizona, United States
- Coordinates: 34°14′3″N 111°21′57″W
- Type: reservoir
- Basin countries: United States
- Surface area: 13 acres (5.3 ha)
- Average depth: 10 ft (3.0 m)
- Surface elevation: 4,840 ft (1,480 m)
- Settlements: Payson

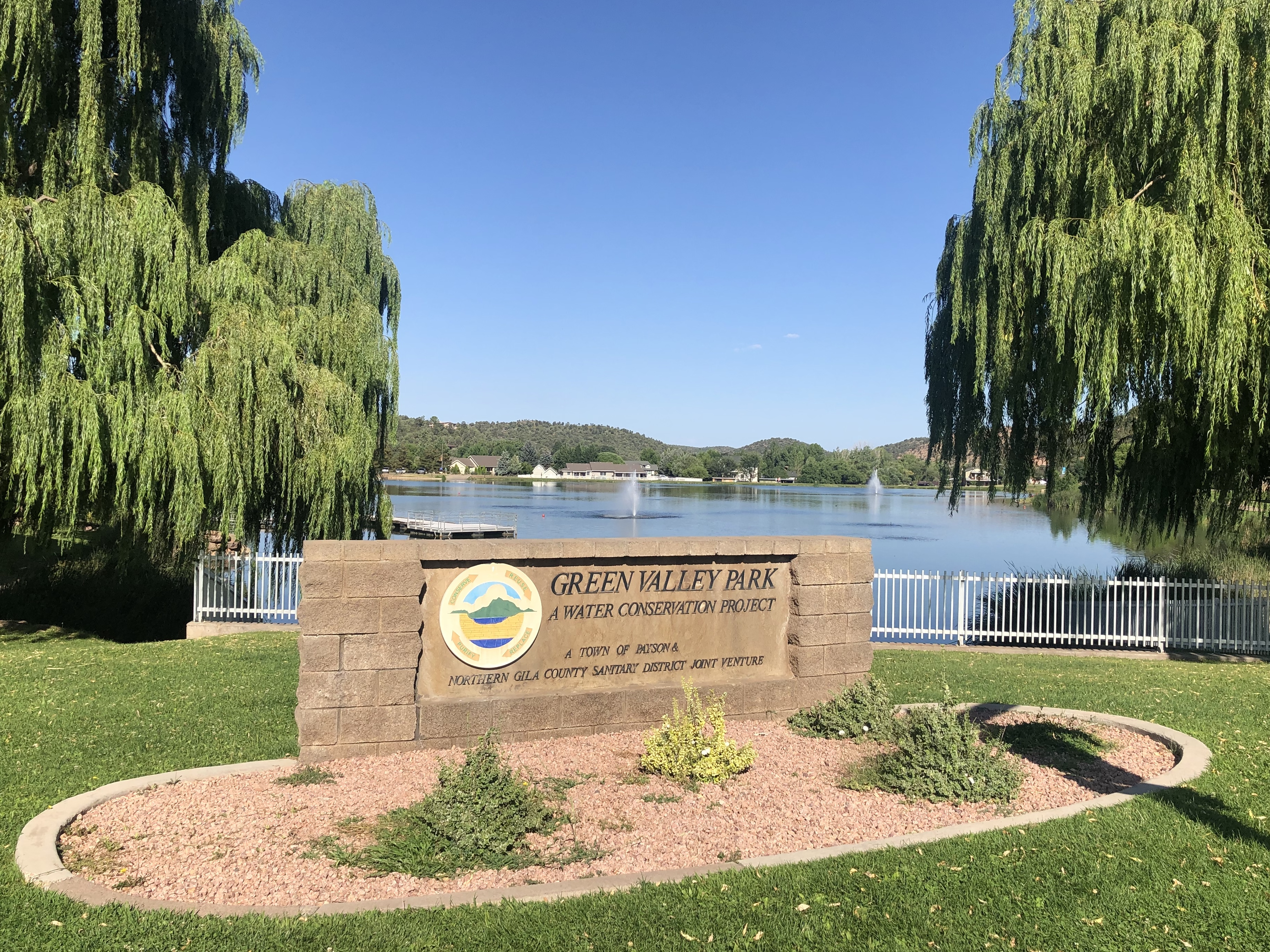
Green Valley Park in the town of Payson, Arizona

Green Valley Lake is located in Payson, Arizona. Green Valley Lake is a reservoir connected to two smaller lakes in Green Valley Park. These lakes were constructed from 1993 to 1996 for ground water recharge.

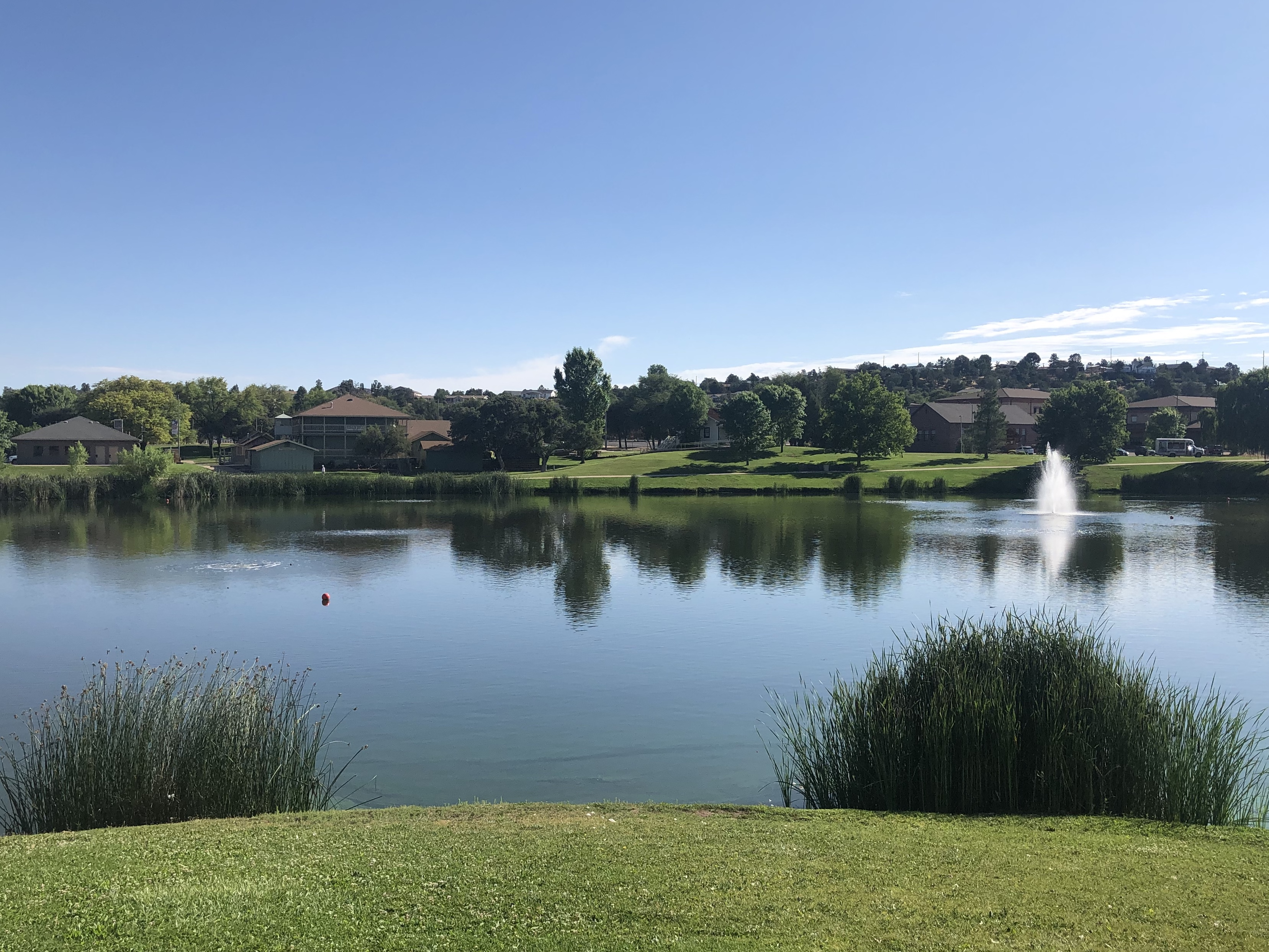
Green Valley Park, Payson Arizona

== Fish species ==
- Rainbow Trout
- Largemouth Bass
- Crappie
- Sunfish
- Channel Catfish
- Bluegill

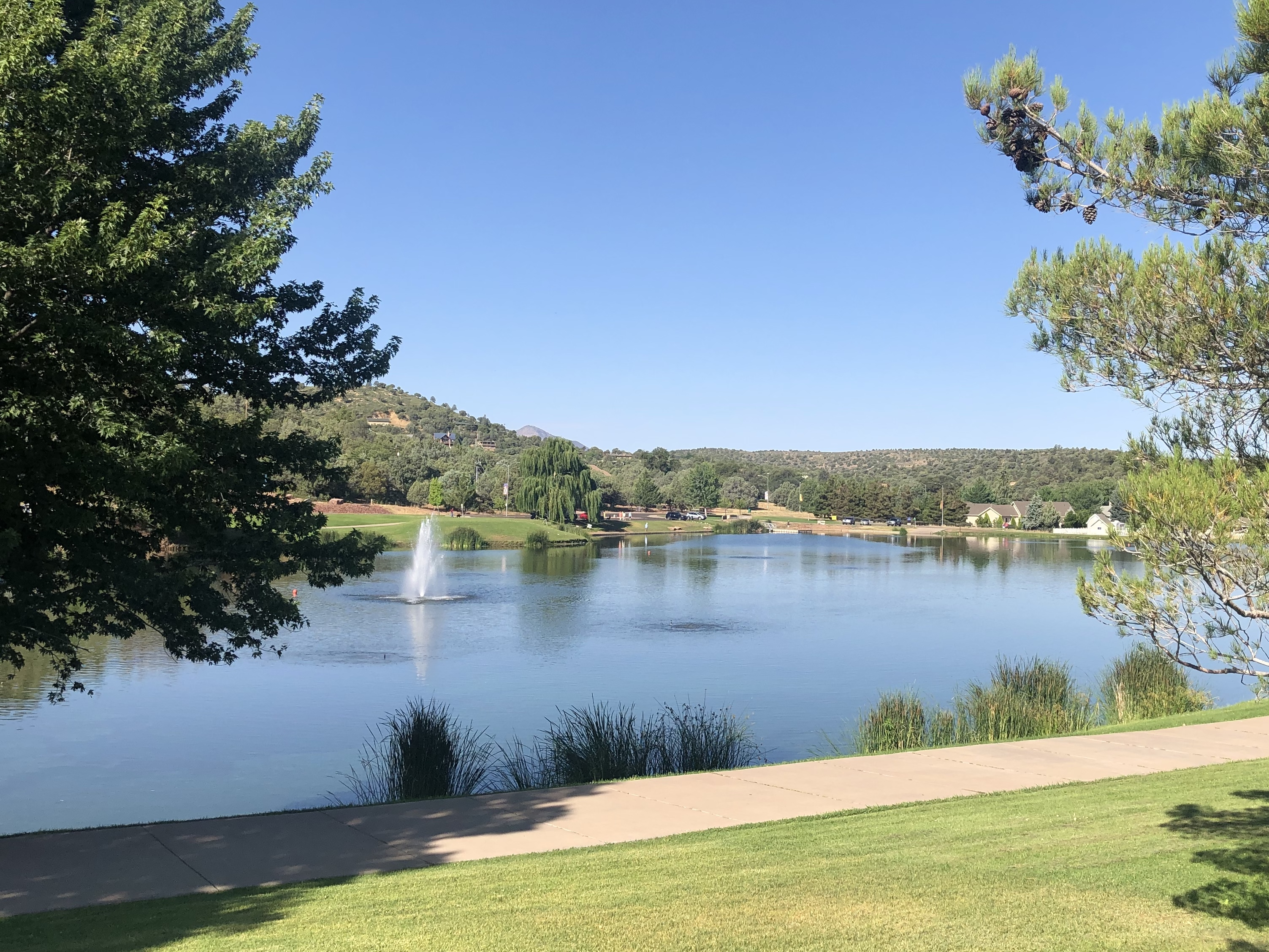
Green Valley Park in Payson, Arizona
