= Green Valley, Kanawha County, West Virginia =

Green Valley, West Virginia
- Unincorporated community
- Location within West Virginia and the United States Green Valley (the United States)
- Coordinates: 38°21′48″N 81°47′15″W
- Country: United States
- State: West Virginia
- County: Kanawha
- Elevation: 600 ft (180 m)
- Time zone: UTC-5 (Eastern (EST))
  - Summer (DST): UTC-4 (EDT)
- ZIP code: 25177
- Area codes: 304 & 681
- GNIS ID: 1742188

Green Valley is an unincorporated community in Kanawha County, West Virginia, United States. Green Valley is 2.5 miles (4.0 km) southeast of St. Albans.
