= Green Valley, Nicholas County, West Virginia =

Green Valley, West Virginia
- Unincorporated community
- Location within West Virginia Location within the United States
- Coordinates: 38°05′58″N 80°41′55″W
- Country: United States
- State: West Virginia
- County: Nicholas
- Elevation: 2,507 ft (764 m)
- Time zone: UTC-5 (Eastern (EST))
  - Summer (DST): UTC-4 (EDT)
- Area codes: 304 & 681
- GNIS feature ID: 1554606

Green Valley is an unincorporated community in Nicholas County, West Virginia, United States. Green Valley is located along West Virginia Route 20, 3 miles (4.8 km) north of Quinwood.
