= List of awards and nominations received by Roger Sanchez =

Roger Sanchez awards and nominations
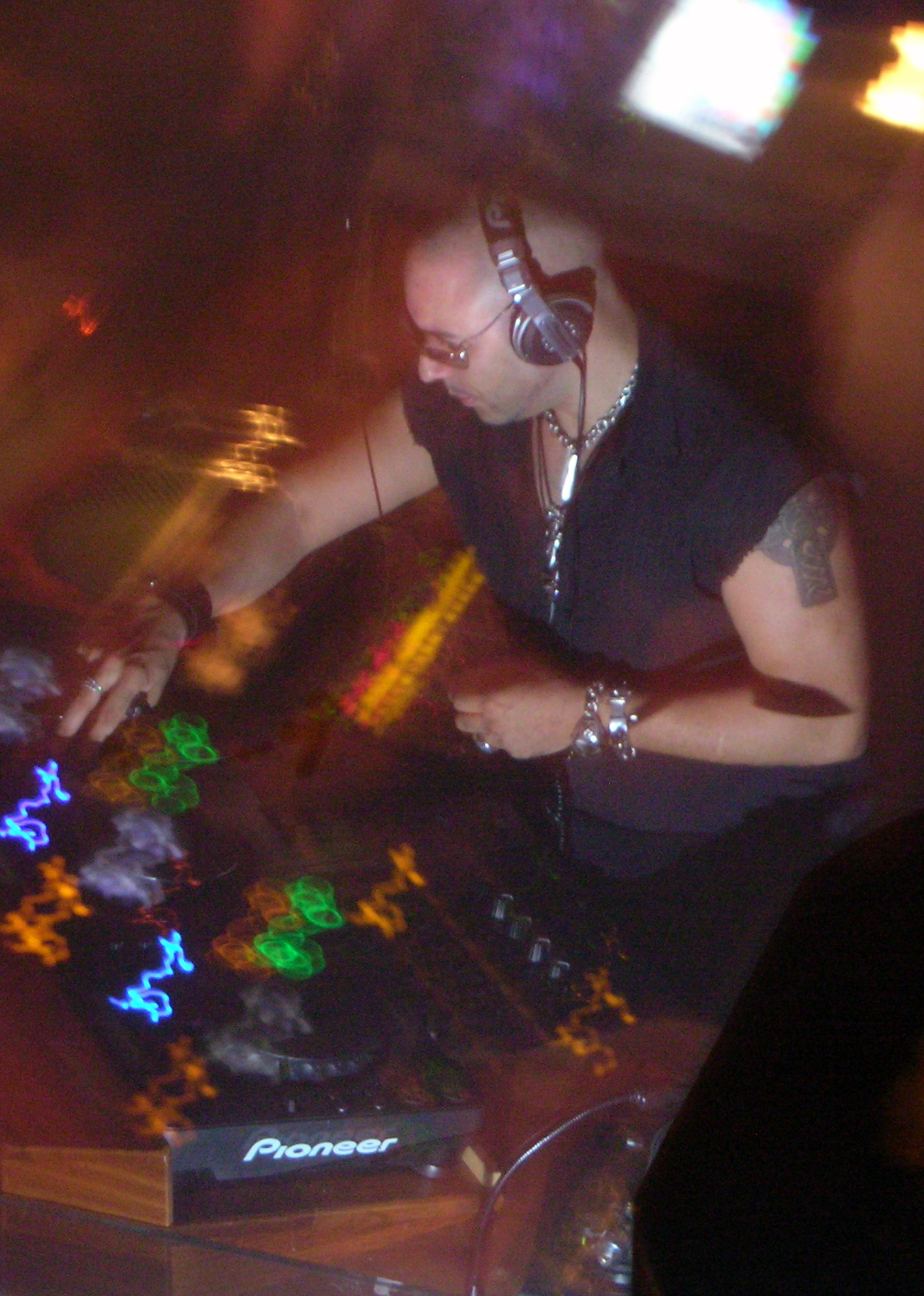
- Roger Sanchez in Ibiza, July 2006
Totals
Award	Wins	Nominations
DJ Awards	4	12
Grammy Award's	1	1
IDMA's	1	12
MTV Europe Awards	0	1
Awards won	6
Nominations	26

This is the list of awards and nominations received by Roger Sanchez, whose career in electronic dance music both as a DJ, Remixer and Music Producer has spanned over 20 years.

Amongst his major competitive awards, Sanchez has won a Grammy Award, four DJ Awards, one International Dance Music Award and been nominated for an MTV Music Award overall in his career to date he has won 6 competitive awards from 26 nominations.

== Awards and nominations ==
=== Grammy Awards ===
Year	Nominated work	Category	Result
2003	No Doubt's "Hella Good"	Best Remixed Recording, Non-Classical	Won

=== MTV Europe Awards ===
The MTV Europe Music Award for Best Dance was first awarded in 1994 and was given every year until 2003, and it was one of the original two genre categories that were added to the MTV Europe Music Awards that year it was re-instated as an award in 2012.

Year	Nominated work	Category	Result
2001	Roger Sanchez	Best Dance Act	Nominated

=== DJ Awards ===
The DJ Awards organizes the annual electronic music DJ awards event it is the only international ceremony for DJs and also the oldest, the awards are held once a year at Pacha club in Ibiza Spain it is one of the most important accolades an artist can win or be honoured by.

Sanchez has won the Best House DJ Award 4 times and received 12 nominations in the same category.

Selected awards
Year	Award	Nominated work	Category	Result
1998	DJ Awards	Roger Sanchez	Best House DJ	Nominated
1999	DJ Awards	Roger Sanchez	Best House DJ	Won
2000	DJ Awards	Roger Sanchez	Best House DJ	Nominated
2001	DJ Awards	Roger Sanchez	Best House DJ	Nominated
2002	DJ Awards	Roger Sanchez	Best House DJ	Won
2003	DJ Awards	Roger Sanchez	Best House DJ	Nominated
2004	DJ Awards	Roger Sanchez	Best House DJ	Won
2005	DJ Awards	Roger Sanchez	Best House DJ	Nominated
2006	DJ Awards	Roger Sanchez	Best House DJ	Nominated
2007	DJ Awards	Roger Sanchez	Best House DJ	Won
2008	DJ Awards	Roger Sanchez	Best House DJ	Nominated
2010	DJ Awards	Roger Sanchez	Best House DJ	Nominated
2018	DJ Awards	Roger Sanchez	DJ House Master	Won

|}

=== International Dance Music Awards ===
In March 2007, Sanchez won the Best Podcast Award he has received a total of 12 IDMA nominations in different categories including 8 for Best American DJ, 1 for Best Global DJ, 1 for Best Producer and 1 for Best Remixer.

Selected awards
Year	Award	Nominated work	Category	Result
2003	IDMA	Roger Sanchez	Best American DJ	Nominated
2005	IDMA	Roger Sanchez	Best American DJ	Nominated
2005	IDMA	Roger Sanchez	Best Global DJ	Nominated
2005	IDMA	Roger Sanchez	Best Producer	Nominated
2005	IDMA	Roger Sanchez	Best Remixer	Nominated
2006	IDMA	Roger Sanchez	Best American DJ	Nominated
2007	IDMA	Roger Sanchez	Best Podcast	Won
2007	IDMA	Roger Sanchez	Best American DJ	Nominated
2008	IDMA	Roger Sanchez	Best American DJ	Nominated
2009	IDMA	Roger Sanchez	Best American DJ	Nominated
2010	IDMA	Roger Sanchez	Best American DJ	Nominated
2010	IDMA	Roger Sanchez	Best American DJ (North America)	Nominated
