= List of awards and nominations received by Carl Cox =

Carl Cox awards and nominations
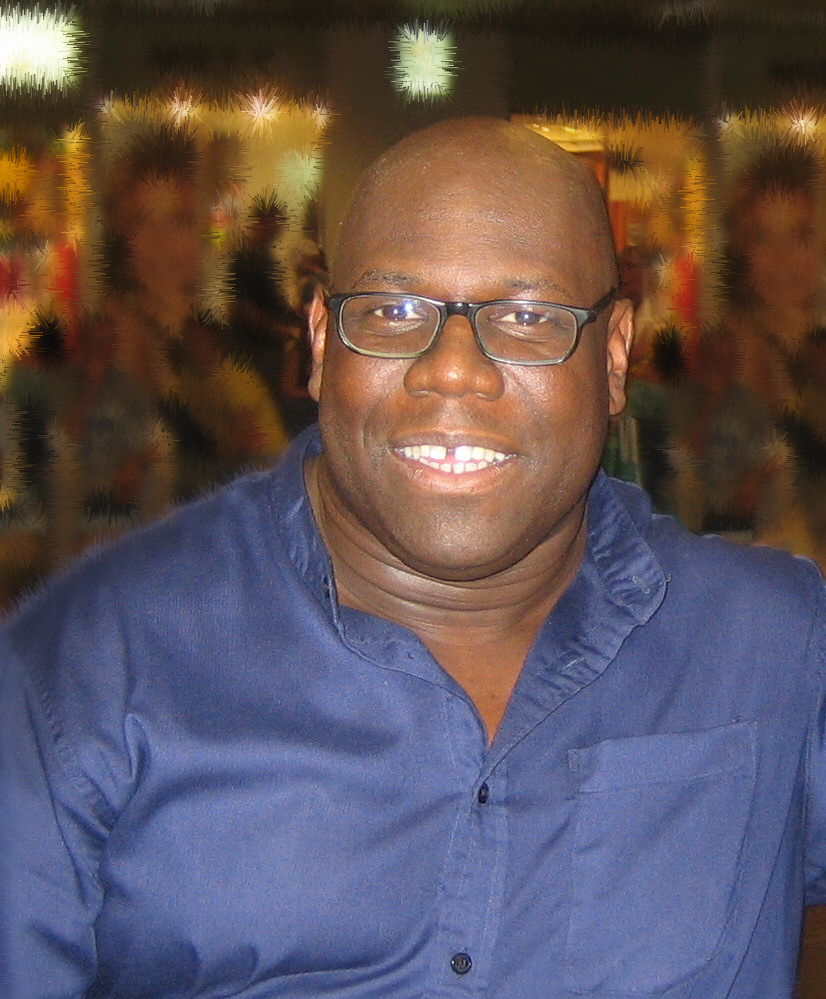
- Carl Cox, 2005.
Totals
Award	Wins	Nominations
DJ Awards	16	35
DJ Mag Awards	3	19
IDMA's	5	12
Mixmag Awards	0	2
NME Awards	1	1
Resident Advisor: Top 100 DJs Poll	0	8
Awards won	26
Nominations	76

This is the list of awards and nominations received by Carl Cox, whose career in electronic dance music both as a DJ, remixer and music producer has spanned over 30 years. He has been nominated for 76 competitive awards and won 26, including 16 DJ Awards, 5 International Dance Music Award's, 3 DJ Mag Award's and 1 NME Award. In the 2026 King’s Birthday Honours, Cox was awarded an OBE for his contributions to the dance music scene.

== DJ Awards ==
The DJ Awards organizes the annual electronic music DJ awards event it is the only international ceremony for DJs and also the oldest, the awards are held once a year at Pacha club in Ibiza Spain it is one of the most important accolades an artist can win or be honoured by.

Cox has won the Best International DJ Award six times, the Best Techno DJ Award seven times, the Best Ibiza Club Night one time and has received a record 35 consecutive nominations since the awards began in 1998.

Year	Nominee / work	Award	Result
1998	Carl Cox	Best Techno/Trance DJ	Nominated
1999	Carl Cox	Best Techno DJ	Nominated
2000	Carl Cox	Best Techno DJ	Nominated
2000	Carl Cox	Best Set of the Season	Won
2001	Carl Cox	Best Techno DJ	Won
2002	Carl Cox	Best Techno DJ	Won
2003	Carl Cox	Best Techno DJ	Nominated
2004	Carl Cox	Best Techno DJ	Nominated
2005	Carl Cox	Best Techno DJ	Nominated
2006	Carl Cox Global @ Space	Best Ibiza Night	Won
2006	Carl Cox	Best Techno DJ	Nominated
2007	Carl Cox	Best Techno DJ	Nominated
2008	Carl Cox	Best International DJ	Nominated
2008	Carl Cox	Best Techno DJ	Nominated
2009	Carl Cox	Best International DJ	Nominated
2009	Carl Cox	Best Techno DJ	Nominated
2010	Carl Cox	Best International DJ	Nominated
2010	Carl Cox	Best Techno DJ	Nominated
2011	Carl Cox	Best International DJ	Nominated
2011	Carl Cox	Best Techno DJ	Won
2011	Carl Cox	Best Ibiza Night	Won
2012	Carl Cox	Best International DJ	Won
2012	Carl Cox	Best Techno DJ	Won
2013	Carl Cox	Best International DJ	Nominated
2013	Carl Cox	Best Techno DJ	Nominated
2014	Carl Cox	Best International DJ	Won
2014	Carl Cox	Best Techno DJ	Won
2015	Carl Cox	Best International DJ	Nominated
2015	Carl Cox	Best Techno DJ	Won
2016	Carl Cox	Best Techno DJ	Won
2016	Carl Cox	Best International DJ	Won
2017	Carl Cox	Best Techno DJ	Won
2018	Carl Cox	Best International DJ	Won
2019	Carl Cox	Best International DJ	Won

== DJ Magazine Awards ==
Artists are nominated to the DJ Magazine Top 100 DJ's list each year the public votes to decide who they rank as the World's No 1 DJ at the end of the poll. Cox was ranked as the World's No 1 DJ in 1996 and 1997 he ranked in the top 5 for 6 years, the top 10 for 10 years and the top 20 for 14 years.

Year	Nominee / work	Award	Result
1996	Carl Cox	World's Top 100 DJs	1
1997	Carl Cox	World's Top 100 DJs	1
1998	Carl Cox	World's Top 100 DJs	2
1999	Carl Cox	World's Top 100 DJs	2
2000	Carl Cox	World's Top 100 DJs	5
2001	Carl Cox	World's Top 100 DJs	5
2002	Carl Cox	World's Top 100 DJs	8
2003	Carl Cox	World's Top 100 DJs	9
2004	Carl Cox	World's Top 100 DJs	11
2005	Carl Cox	World's Top 100 DJs	10
2006	Carl Cox	World's Top 100 DJs	11
2007	Carl Cox	World's Top 100 DJs	7
2008	Carl Cox	World's Top 100 DJs	12
2009	Carl Cox	World's Top 100 DJs	18
2010	Carl Cox	World's Top 100 DJs	22
2011	Carl Cox	World's Top 100 DJs	33
2012	Carl Cox	World's Top 100 DJs	46
2013	Carl Cox	World's Top 100 DJs	46
2014	Carl Cox	World's Top 100 DJs	59
2015	Carl Cox	World's Top 100 DJs	63
2016	Carl Cox	World's Top 100 DJs	74
2017	Carl Cox	World's Top 100 DJs	62
2018	Carl Cox	World's Top 100 DJs	53
2019	Carl Cox	World's Top 100 DJs	35
2020	Carl Cox	World's Top 100 DJs	34
2021	Carl Cox	World's Top 100 DJs	27
2022	Carl Cox	World's Top 100 DJs	22
2023	Carl Cox	World's Top 100 DJs	26

Year	Nominee / work	Award	Result
1992	Carl Cox	No1 Rave DJ	Won

== International Dance Music Awards ==
The International Dance Music Awards is a major event which is part of the Winter Music Conference (WMC) a weeklong electronic music conference, held every March since 1985 in Miami Beach, Florida, United States.

Cox has been nominated twelve times with five wins.

=== Pre-2016 ===
Year	Nominee / work	Award	Result
1994	Carl Cox	DJ of the Year	Won
1995	Carl Cox	DJ of the Year	Won
1996	Carl Cox	Best DJ	Won
2003	Carl Cox	Best European DJ	Nominated
2006	Carl Cox	Best Global DJ	Nominated
2007	Carl Cox	Best Global DJ	Nominated
2008	Carl Cox	Best Global DJ	Nominated
2009	Carl Cox	Best Global DJ	Nominated
2014	Carl Cox	Best European DJ	Nominated

=== 2018–present ===
No award ceremony was held in 2017. In 2018 winners were chosen by the Winter Music Conference themselves. 2019 marks the first year of public voting since the Winter Music Conference's restructure.

Year	Nominee / work	Award	Result
2018	Carl Cox	Best Male Artist (Underground)	Won
2019	Carl Cox	Best Male (Techno)	Nominated
2020	Carl Cox	Best Male (Techno)	Won

== Mixmag Awards ==
In 2010 Mixmag selected nominations for the title of Greatest DJ of All Time the results of the worldwide public vote were announced in January 2011 Cox was ranked 5th.

Year	Nominee / work	Award	Result
2011	Carl Cox	Greatest DJ of All Time	5th place
2016	Carl Cox	Top 20 DJ's of 2016	2nd place

== NME Awards ==
At the 2001 NME Award's Cox won the Best Club DJ Award

Year	Nominee / work	Award	Result
2001	Carl Cox	Best Club DJ	Won

== Resident Advisor Awards ==
Since 2008, Carl Cox has been listed on Resident Advisor's poll for the top 100 DJs of the year, which is voted on by the public.

Year	Nominee / work	Award	Result
2008	Carl Cox	Best DJ	34th
2009	Carl Cox	Best DJ	46th
2010	Carl Cox	Best DJ	45th
2011	Carl Cox	Best DJ	32nd
2012	Carl Cox	Best DJ	57th
2013	Carl Cox	Best DJ	39th
2014	Carl Cox	Best DJ	49th
2015	Carl Cox	Best DJ	59th
