= Katherine Ellis =

- Also known as: Katherine Ellis, Kathy Wood, Arrola
- Born: Katherine Jane Margaret Wood; 21 June 1965 (age 61)
- Origin: Bromley, Kent, England
- Genres: Electronica, funky house, disco house
- Label: Various
- Website: Official Website

Katherine Ellis (born Katherine Jane Margaret Wood on 21 June 1965 in Bromley, England) is an English electronica vocalist and songwriter. A mainstay of the house music genre past and present, she has been featured on vocals since 1990. Ellis is also a member of the band Bimbo Jones.

== Background ==
=== Personal life ===
Her husband Max Ellis, with whom she has two sons, is a professional photographer. Her brother Thomas is a theatre actor. Katherine's family lineage also have ties to the entertainment spectrum; her mother Elizabeth was trained as an actress at the Royal Academy for dramatic art, her grandmother Joy was a violinist and pianist, and her great-grandmother Elizabeth Haslam was an opera singer who won a competition at the Royal Albert Hall in 1893.

=== Professional career ===
She records under the aliases Katherine Ellis, Kathy Wood, Arrola and K. Ellis and her maiden name Katherine Wood. (Note: She has no connection with two American performers with the same name: vocalist Katherine E (also born Katherine Ellis, whose well-known single was "Then I Feel Good", released in 1991, even though some biographies and websites have understandably mistaken the two artists as being the same person, as well as having the same vocal range) and the actress Katherine "Kate" Ellis (born 1981), who appeared as a regular on Days of Our Lives, in the 2001 Disney movie Motocrossed and the 2003 film Old School.)

Katherine has been a vocalist since the age of 15, performing lead and backing vocals. Her touring credits include that of working with Belinda Carlisle, Chaka Khan, Boy George and Roger Sanchez.

She has recorded with a variety of prominent names in dance music including Freemasons, Soul Avengerz, Dave Lee, Roger Sanchez, Meat Katie, Dylan Rhymes, Lee Coombs and Tom Stephan.

From 1997 to 2000, Ellis was the vocalist for Ruff Driverz, singing "Deeper Love," "Don't Stop," "Shame," and the international hit "Dreaming" (for which she also wrote the Spanish topline under the credited alias name of 'Arrola').

In 2008, Ellis' releases included "When You Touch Me" with Freemasons (Loaded), "Ain't Nothin' Goin' On But The Rent" with 7th Heaven (Hard2Beat), "Poza (Got What I Need)" with Countparis (Eyezcream), "Do It" with DJ Prom (GFab), "Gotta Get Through" with Paul Emanuel & Gav McCall (Born to Dance), and "One Luv" with Soul Avengerz (Milk & Sugar/One Love Recordings); as well as "Laisser Toucher" with Cerrone which is featured in the French film, Disco!.

In 2009, her releases include the re-release of "Dreaming", "You're Mine" with Solitaire (Muzik K) and "Time 2 Play" with Soulshaker (Audiofreaks) as well as an acoustic version of "Hideaway" featured on New State Music's UnClubbed Album. She also wrote and performed two tracks, "Control" and "You Make Me Crazy" that featured on Lee Coombs' 2009 album, Light & Dark.

Ellis is also a member of the band Bimbo Jones, who are signed to Tommy Boy Records. The group released its album Harlem 1 Stop in late 2008. Ellis received cowriting and vocal credit for all tracks, including lead single "And I Try", which reached No. 1 on the US Billboard's Hot Dance Club Songs chart in October 2008.

Ellis contributed vocals to the track "Gravity" on the score of Gravity, composed by Steven Price, which won the Academy Award for Best Original Score. She has also performed the song "Gravity" live in concert, including at the Hollywood in Vienna 2016 film music gala, where it was performed by the ORF Radio‑Symphonieorchester Wien with solo vocals by Ellis and Julia Schreyvogel.

Ellis was heard as the vocalist on the Gaviscon "What A Feelin'" advertisement in the UK. Aside from her music career, Ellis has also done film and television commercial work.

== Discography and writing credits ==
Featured vocalist

- 1990 Less Stress featuring Katherine Wood / "Don't Dream It's Over" / Junior Boy's Own (Vocalist)
- 1991 Bocca Juniors / "Substantially Soulful" / Junior Boys Own (Vocalist)
- 1994 4-2 the Floor / "Future Love" / Almighty Records (Vocalist)
- 1994 4-2 the Floor / "Watching You Watching Me" / Almighty Records (Vocalist)
- 1994 Back to Basics / "Always" / Almighty Records (Vocalist)
- 1994 Back to Basics / "All For Love" / Almighty Records (Vocalist)
- 1995 Kathy Wood / "Give me Joy" / Phuture Trax (Vocalist)
- 1996 Eruption featuring Katherine Wood / "Let The Music" (Vocalist)
- 1997 Eruption featuring Katherine Wood / "Reach Out" (Vocalist)
- 1997 Eruption featuring Katherine Wood / "Surrender" (Vocalist)
- 1997 Ruff Driverz / "Don't Stop" / Undisputed & Inferno (Vocalist) UK No. 30
- 1997 Ruff Driverz / "Deeper Love" / Inferno (Vocalist) UK No. 19
- 1998 Ruff Driverz / "Shame" / Inferno (Vocalist) UK No. 51
- 1999 4-2 the Floor featuring Jayne Montgomery / "What Have You Done For Me" / Almighty Records (Vocalist)
- 1999 Jayne Montgomery / "Baby One More Time" / Almighty Records (Vocalist)
- 2000 Jayne Montgomery / "Searchin' My Soul" / Almighty (Vocalist)
- 2006 Roger Sanchez featuring Lisa Pure & Katherine Ellis / "Lost" / Stealth Recordings (Vocalist)
- 2006 Robbie Williams / "Kiss Me" / EMI (Backing Vocals & Voice of the Sexy Robot)
- 2007 ASBO featuring Katherine Ellis / "Let the Beat Hit 'Em" / Hed Kandi Records (Vocalist)
- 2007 Wilder & Clarke featuring Katherine Ellis / "Stand Up" / Hed Kandi Records (Vocalist)
- 2008 Cerrone vs Katherine Ellis / "Laisser Toucher" / Maligator Productions (Vocalist)
- 2008 7th Heaven featuring Katherine Ellis / "Nothin' Goin' On But The Rent" / Unreleased Ministry of Sound (Vocalist)
- 2009 Katherine Ellis / "Hideaway" / UnClubbed (Album) / New State Music (Vocalist)
- 2010 DJ Nick Corline vs Katherine Ellis / "I Love This Life (Could You Be Loved)" / Net's Work International (Vocalist)
- 2010 Oxford Hustlers & Katherine Ellis / "Love U More" / Fierce Angel (Vocalist)
- 2011 ASBO featuring Katherine Ellis / "Let the Beat Hit 'Em" (Stefano Noferini Mix) / Hed Kandi Records (Vocalist)
- 2012 Jolyon Petch & Sam Hill vs Katherine Ellis / "Sexydancer" / Club Luxury Records (Vocalist)
- 2012 Utah Saints vs Drumsound & Bassline Smith / What can you do for me / Ministry of Sound (Vocalist)
- 2013 Booker T featuring Katherine Ellis / Give me joy / Liquid Deep Records (Vocalist)
- 2013 Steven Price: Gravity Original Motion Picture Soundtrack / "Gravity" / Water Tower Records (Vocalist)
- 2013 7th Heaven featuring Katherine Ellis / Love is alive / 7H Label (Vocalist)
- 2016 Guy Scheiman & Katherine Ellis / "Say A Little Prayer" / Guy Scheiman Records (Vocalist)
- 2018 Guy Scheiman & Katherine Ellis / "Are You Ready For Love" / Guy Scheiman Records (Vocalist)
- 2019 Facey featuring Katherine Ellis / "Feelin' Love" / White (Vocalist)
- 2021 Guy Scheiman & Katherine Ellis / "Say A Little Prayer" "DJ Head Remix" Album Track) / Guy Scheiman Records (Vocalist)
- 2021 Guy Scheiman & Katherine Ellis / "Say A Little Prayer" "Luis Vazquez Remix" Album Track) / Guy Scheiman Records (Vocalist)
- 2022 Freejak x Katherine Ellis / "Gonna Catch Ya" / Promo Only Unreleased (Vocalist)

Vocalist and writer/co-writer

- 1998 Ruff Driverz presents Arrola / "Dreaming" / Inferno (Vocalist/Writer) UK No. 10
- 1999 Ruff Driverz presents Arrola / "La Musica" Inferno (Vocalist/Writer) UK No. 14
- 2000 La Fiesta / "Dreaming" / Oxyd Records (Vocalist/Writer)
- 2001 W.O.S.P / "Gettin' Into U" / Data Records (Vocalist/Writer) UK No. 48
- 2002 ATFC featuring Katherine Ellis / "Fakerman" OnePhatDeeva (Vocalist/Writer)
- 2002 Raven Maize / "Fascinated" / Data Records (Vocalist/Writer) UK No. 37
- 2004 Dylan Rhymes featuring Katherine Ellis / "Salty" / Kingsize Records (Vocalist/Writer) UK No. 70
- 2004 Lee Coombs featuring Katherine Ellis/ "Shiver" / Finger Lickin' Records / Azuli Records (Vocalist/Writer)
- 2005 Tom Stephan featuring Katherine Ellis/ "Here I Come" / Chumbomundo Records (Vocalist/Writer)
- 2005 Dylan Rhymes featuring Katherine Ellis / "Sugar DJ" / Kingsize Records (Vocalist/Writer)
- 2006 Bimbo Jones / "Harlem One Stop" / Columbia Records (Vocalist/Co-Writer)
- 2006 Mark Knight featuring Katherine Ellis / "Insatiable" / Toolroom Records (Vocalist/Writer)
- 2006 Tom Stephan featuring Katherine Ellis / "DOG" / Chumbomundo Records (Vocalist/Writer)
- 2006 Soul Flava featuring Katherine Ellis / "We Got Love" / DTPM/Blue Cube (Vocalist/Writer)
- 2006 Lee Coombs featuring Katherine Ellis / "Control" / Thrust Recordings (Vocalist/Writer)
- 2006 Meat Katie featuring Katherine Ellis / "What I Like" / "Lot 49" (Vocalist/Writer)
- 2006 Meat Katie featuring Katherine Ellis / "Round & Round" / Adrift Records (Vocalist/Writer)
- 2007 Cerrone featuring Katherine Ellis / "Loverboy" / Maligator Productions (Vocalist/Co-Writer)
- 2007 Jason Herd featuring Katherine Ellis / "So Strong" / J Funk Recordings (Vocalist/Writer)
- 2007 Matteo Esse & Sant featuring Katherine Ellis / "Not Hanging Around" / Cosmonote Blue (Vocalist/Writer)
- 2008 Soul Avengerz featuring Katherine Ellis / "One Luv" (One Love Recordings/Milk & Sugar) (Vocalist/Writer)
- 2008 Countparis & Katherine Ellis / "Poza (Got What I Need)" / Eyezcream Recordings (Vocalist/Writer)
- 2008 Prom featuring Katherine Ellis / "Do It" / Gfab (Vocalist/Writer)
- 2008 Paul Emanuel & Gav McCall featuring Katherine Ellis / "Gotta Get Thru" / Born to Dance Records (Vocalist/Writer)
- 2008 Tim Belcher & Katherine Ellis / "Stiletto Strutt" / Forthcoming on Cosmonote Blue Records (Vocalist/Writer)
- 2008 Freemasons featuring Katherine Ellis / "When You Touch Me" / Loaded Records (Vocalist/Writer) UK No. 30
- 2009 Ruff Driverz presents Arrola / "Dreaming 2009" / Maelstrom (Vocalist/Writer)
- 2009 Lee Coombs featuring Katherine Ellis / "Control" / Light & Dark (Album) Lot49 (Vocalist/Writer)
- 2009 Lee Coombs featuring Katherine Ellis / "You Make Me Crazy" / Light & Dark (Album) Lot49 (Vocalist/Writer)
- 2009 Solitaire and Katherine Ellis / "You're Mine" / Mukik K Records (Vocalist/Writer)
- 2009 Soulshaker and Katherine Ellis / "Time 2 Play" / Audiofreaks (Vocalist/Writer)
- 2010 Mr D.Y.F and Katherine Ellis / "All Day Lover" (Vocalist/Writer)
- 2010 Katherine Ellis and 3DR Mafia / "Little Bit of Love" (Vocalist/Writer)
- 2010 Alex Nocera & Katherine Ellis / "Living for the Sundown" / Net's Work International (Vocalist/Writer)
- 2010 Regi & Katherine Ellis / "High on Your Love" / Registrated 2 (Album) Mostiko (Vocalist/Writer)
- 2010 Juan Kidd & Felix Baumgartner vs Katherine Ellis / "All You Need" Subliminal Records (Vocalist/Writer)
- 2011 Katherine Ellis & Addict DJs / "I'm Coming Out" / Ambassade/Pool e Music (Vocalist/Writer)
- 2011 Katherine Ellis & The Studiopunks / "Feed the Fire" / Vendetta Records/Blanco Y Negro (Vocalist/Writer)
- 2011 Samuel Sartini featuring Katherine Ellis / "Jumping" / Do It Yourself Records (Vocalist/Co-Writer)
- 2011 Katherine Ellis vs Craig C and Xtra Agenda / "Somebody Close" / Nine Records (Vocalist/Writer)
- 2011 Elektrik Disko & Katherine Ellis / "Nothin' but luv" / Club Luxury Records (Vocalist/Writer)
- 2012 Mr DYF & Katherine Ellis / "All day lover" / Starlight Records (Vocalist/Writer)
- 2012 Raven Maize / "Fascinated (Alex Kenji Remixes)" / Z Records (Vocalist/Writer)
- 2012 Steve Forest & Katherine Ellis / The real thing / Sound of Pirates (Vocalist/Writer)
- 2012 Steven Lee & Granite starring Katherine Ellis / "Siempre Tu" / Launch Entertainment LLC (Vocalist/Writer)
- 2012 Paul Morrell & Katherine Ellis / "That ain't the way (to show me love)" / Whore House Records (Vocalist/Writer)
- 2012 Paul Morrell & Katherine Ellis featuring Dan W / "No trouble" / Big in Ibiza (Vocalist/Writer)
- 2012 Bimbo Jones / "And I try (Bisbetic & Lee Dagger Remix)" / Tommy Boy Records (Vocalist/Writer)
- 2013 Freemasons featuring Katherine Ellis / "Tears" / Freemaison (Vocalist/Writer)
- 2013 Katherine Ellis vs Hugo Kalfon and Rio dela Duna / "Are U out there?" / S2G Productions (Vocalist/Writer)
- 2014 Andrea Martini & Katherine Ellis / "Set free" / Emotive Sounds (Vocalist/Writer)
- 2014 ATFC featuring Katherine Ellis / "Fakerman" / Conkrete (Vocalist/Writer)
- 2014 Pegasus featuring Katherine Ellis / "Cold Light of Day" (Album Track) Freemaison (Vocalist/Writer)
- 2014 Jetlag Live! & Katherine Ellis / "Your love" / One Million Records (Vocalist/Writer)
- 2015 My Digital Enemy & Katherine Ellis / "Live Again" / One Love (Vocalist/Writer)
- 2015 The Peverell Brothers, Vigo Qinan & Katherine Ellis / "You wanna see me (Jon Fitz Tribute)" / Jango Music (Vocalist/Writer)
- 2016 Cat Deejane & Katherine Ellis / "Take Me Over (I Found Love)" / Lickin' Records (Vocalist/Writer)
- 2016 Guy Scheiman & Katherine Ellis / "The One I Can't Forget" / Guy Scheiman Records (Writer/Vocalist)
- 2016 Astero & Katherine Ellis / "Forbidden Lover" / Global Dance (Writer/Vocalist)
- 2016 Lee Coombs presents Katherine Ellis and Phazon / "Experiments E.P - I Believe" / Freakin909 (Vocalist/Writer)
- 2017 Lee Coombs presents Katherine Ellis and Phazon / "My Acid Soul" / Freakin303 (Vocalist/Writer)
- 2017 Paul Morrell featuring Katherine Ellis / "Keep on lovin' me" / Somn'thing Records (Vocalist/Writer)
- 2017 Samuel Sartini & Katherine Ellis / "I Need U" / Armada (Vocalist/Writer)
- 2018 Kayligs x Katherine Ellis / "I'm yours" / Jango Music (Vocalist/Writer)
- 2019 Katherine Ellis & Testone / "Perfect" / Swishcraft Music (Vocalist/Writer)
- 2019 Sweet LA & Katherine Ellis / "I Gotta Know" / Somn'thing Records (Vocalist/Writer)
- 2019 SRJ & Katherine Ellis / "Taste of Honey" / SRJ Productions (Vocalist/Writer)
- 2019 SRJ & Katherine Ellis / "Been so Lonely" / SRJ Productions (Vocalist/Writer)
- 2021 Guy Scheiman & Katherine Ellis / "The One I Can't Forget" "Dub" Album Track) / Guy Scheiman Records (Vocalist/Writer)
- 2021 Katherine Ellis & Lee Dagger / "Stronger Together" / Swishcraft Music (Vocalist/Writer)
- 2021 Freemasons featuring Katherine Ellis / "When you touch me (Tea Dance Classic Remixes)" / Swishcraft Music (Vocalist/Writer)
- 2022 Mark Picchiotti & Katherine Ellis / "Mama's Dirty Little Baby" / Funkylove (Vocalist/Writer)
- 2022 Chesser & Katherine Ellis / "Party all Night" / SHAPESHIFT Records (Vocalist/Writer)

Writing credits

- 2001 M&S Presents the Girl Next Door / "Salsoul Nugget (If U Wanna)" (Writer) UK No. 6
- 2003 4Tune 500 / "Dancing in the Dark" / Black Gold (Writer)
- 2004 Peter Andre / "That's Where I'll Belong" / Warner Music UK Ltd / (Co-Written by Katherine Ellis, Paul Meehan & Tim Woodcock)
- 2005 Jo O'Meara / "That's Where I'll Belong" / Saga Entertainment Limited / (Co-Written by Katherine Ellis, Paul Meehan & Tim Woodcock)
- 2012 Sergey Lazarev / "That's Where I'll Belong" / KISSKOALA / (Co-Written by Katherine Ellis, Paul Meehan & Tim Woodcock)
- 2017 Charlie Hides / "Don't Call Us" / Charlie Hides Records (Co-Written by Katherine Ellis, Charlie Hides & La Rox)
- 2017 Charlie Hides / "Bitch Thin" / Charlie Hides Records (Co-Written by Katherine Ellis, Charlie Hides & La Rox)
- 2017 Charlie Hides / "Rain on the Dame" / Charlie Hides Records (Co-Written by Katherine Ellis, Charlie Hides & La Rox)
