= List of awards and nominations received by Paul van Dyk =

Paul van Dyk awards and nominations
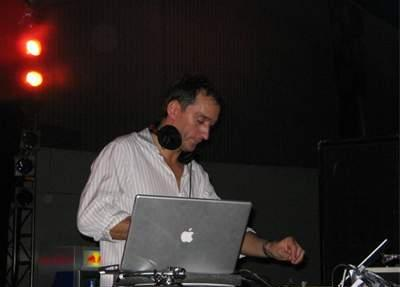
- Paul Van Dyk in El Salvador.
Totals
Award	Wins	Nominations
DJ Awards	1	14
DJ Mag Awards	2	10
IDMA's	10	32
Grammy Awards	1	2
Mixmag Awards	1	1
Trance Awards	18	18
Awards won	32
Nominations	67

This is the list of awards and nominations received by Paul van Dyk, whose career in electronic music both as a DJ, record producer and musician is over 20 years.

Amongst his major competitive achievements, Van Dyk has won one Grammy Award, 10 International Dance Music Award's, 18 Trance Awards, two DJ Mag Award's, one Mixmag Award and one DJ Awards. Overall in his career, to date, he has won 32 competitive awards from 67 nominations and has sold over three million albums worldwide.

== Awards and nominations ==
=== DJ Awards ===
The DJ Awards organizes the annual electronic music DJ awards event it is the only international ceremony for DJs and also the oldest, the awards are held once a year at Pacha club in Ibiza Spain it is one of the most important accolades an artist can win or be honoured by.

Van Dyk won the Best Trance DJ Award in 2006 and alsoThe Trance Master Award on 2018 and has received a 16 nominations since the awards began in 1998.

Year	Nominee / work	Award	Result
1999	Paul van Dyk	Best Techno DJ	Nominated
2000	Paul van Dyk	Best Trance DJ	Nominated
2001	Paul van Dyk	Best Trance DJ	Nominated
2004	Paul van Dyk	Best Trance DJ	Nominated
2005	Paul van Dyk	Best Trance DJ	Nominated
2006	Paul van Dyk	Best Trance DJ	Won
2008	Paul van Dyk	Best Trance DJ	Nominated
2010	Paul van Dyk	Best Trance DJ	Nominated
2010	Paul van Dyk	Best International DJ	Nominated
2011	Paul van Dyk	Best Trance DJ	Nominated
2012	Paul van Dyk	Best Trance DJ	Nominated
2013	Paul van Dyk	Best Trance DJ	Nominated
2015	Paul van Dyk	Best Trance DJ	Nominated
2016	Paul van Dyk	Best Trance DJ	Nominated
2018	Paul van Dyk	Best Trance DJ / Trance Master	Won

=== DJ Magazine Awards ===
Artists are nominated to the DJ Magazine Top 100 DJ's list each year the public votes to decide who they rank as the World's No 1 DJ at the end of the poll. Van Dyk was ranked as the World's No 1 DJ in 2005 and 2006 he ranked in the top 5 for 7 years, the top 10 for 8 years and the top 20 for 10 years.

Year	Nominee / work	Award	Result
1997	Paul van Dyk	World's Top 100 DJs	42
1998	Paul van Dyk	World's Top 100 DJs	6
1999	Paul van Dyk	World's Top 100 DJs	5
2000	Paul van Dyk	World's Top 100 DJs	4
2001	Paul van Dyk	World's Top 100 DJs	4
2002	Paul van Dyk	World's Top 100 DJs	4
2003	Paul van Dyk	World's Top 100 DJs	2
2004	Paul van Dyk	World's Top 100 DJs	2
2005	Paul van Dyk	World's Top 100 DJs	1
2006	Paul van Dyk	World's Top 100 DJs	1
2007	Paul van Dyk	World's Top 100 DJs	4
2008	Paul van Dyk	World's Top 100 DJs	3
2009	Paul van Dyk	World's Top 100 DJs	5
2010	Paul van Dyk	World's Top 100 DJs	6
2011	Paul van Dyk	World's Top 100 DJs	11
2012	Paul van Dyk	World's Top 100 DJs	16
2013	Paul van Dyk	World's Top 100 DJs	32
2014	Paul van Dyk	World's Top 100 DJs	38
2015	Paul van Dyk	World's Top 100 DJs	41
2016	Paul van Dyk	World's Top 100 DJs	60
2017	Paul van Dyk	World's Top 100 DJs	51
2018	Paul van Dyk	World's Top 100 DJs	55
2019	Paul van Dyk	World's Top 100 DJs	87
2020	Paul van Dyk	World's Top 100 DJs	50
2021	Paul van Dyk	World's Top 100 DJs	41
2022	Paul van Dyk	World's Top 100 DJs	38
2023	Paul van Dyk	World's Top 100 DJs	45
2024	Paul van Dyk	World's Top 100 DJs	37

=== Grammy Awards ===
The Grammy Awards(originally called Gramophone Award), or Grammy, is an accolade by the National Academy of Recording Arts and Sciences (NARAS) of the United States to recognize outstanding achievement in the music industry. Paul van Dyk has received 1 award and 2 nominations overall.

Year	Nominee / work	Award	Result
2005	Paul van Dyk	Best Dance/Electronic album "Reflections"	Nominated
2008	Paul van Dyk	Best Soundtrack in a Motion Picture "The Dark Knight"	Won

=== International Dance Music Awards ===
The IDMA is a major event which is part of the Winter Music Conference (WMC) a weeklong electronic music conference, held every March since 1985 in Miami Beach, Florida, United States. Paul van Dyk has won 10 awards and been nominated 32 times.

Year	Nominee / work	Award	Result
2002	Paul van Dyk	Best European DJ	Nominated
2002	Paul van Dyk	Best Global DJ	Nominated
2003	Paul van Dyk	Best European DJ	Won
2003	Paul van Dyk	Best Global DJ	Nominated
2004	Paul van Dyk	Best Track House Progressive/Trance: Nothing But You	Won
2004	Paul van Dyk	Best Global DJ	Won
2005	Paul van Dyk	Best HI NRG/Euro Track: The Other Side	Won
2005	Paul van Dyk	Best Global DJ	Won
2005	Paul van Dyk	Best Dance Video: The Other Side	Nominated
2005	Paul van Dyk	Best Full Length DJ Mix CD: The Politics of Dancing Vol. 2	Won
2006	Paul van Dyk	Best European DJ	Won
2006	Paul van Dyk	Best Global DJ	Nominated
2007	Paul van Dyk	Best Progressive House/Trance Track:Let Go (Mute)	Won
2007	Paul van Dyk	Best European DJ	Nominated
2007	Paul van Dyk	Best Global DJ	Nominated
2007	Paul van Dyk	Best Full Length DJ Mix CD: In Between	Nominated
2007	Paul van Dyk	Best Producer	Nominated
2008	Paul van Dyk	Best European DJ	Nominated
2008	Paul van Dyk	Best Global DJ	Nominated
2008	Paul van Dyk	Best Full Length DJ Mix CD: Cream Ibiza (New State UK)	Nominated
2008	Paul van Dyk	Best Producer	Won
2009	Paul van Dyk	Best European DJ	Nominated
2009	Paul van Dyk	Best Global DJ	Nominated
2009	Paul van Dyk	Best Full Length DJ Mix CD: VONYC Sessions 09 (Vandit Records)	Won
2010	Paul van Dyk	Best European DJ	Nominated
2010	Paul van Dyk	Best Global DJ	Nominated
2010	Paul van Dyk: VONYC Sessions	Best Podcast	Nominated
2011	Paul van Dyk	Best European DJ	Nominated
2011	Paul van Dyk: VONYC Sessions	Best Podcast	Nominated
2012	Paul van Dyk	Best Trance Track:The Ocean (Arty)	Nominated
2012	Paul van Dyk: VONYC Sessions	Best Podcast	Nominated
2014	Paul van Dyk	Best Trance DJ	Nominated

=== Mixmag Awards ===
In 2004 Mixmag selected nominations for the title of their first Worlds No1 DJ award poll the results of the public vote ranked Paul van Dyk 1st in 2005.

Year	Nominee / work	Award	Result
2005	Paul Van Dyk	Worlds No 1 DJ	1st place

=== Trance Awards ===
Paul van Dyk has won a total of 18 Awards at this event.

Year	Nominee / work	Award	Result
2005	Paul van Dyk	Best Producer	Won
2005	Paul van Dyk	Best Global DJ	Won
2006	Paul van Dyk	Best Global DJ	Won
2006	Paul van Dyk	Best Producer	Won
2007	Paul van Dyk	Best Global DJ	Won
2007	Paul van Dyk	Best Producer	Won
2007	Paul van Dyk	Best Label "VANDIT"	Won
2007	Paul van Dyk	Best Remixer	Won
2007	Paul van Dyk	Best Live Act	Won
2007	Paul van Dyk	Best Album "In Between"	Won
2007	Paul van Dyk	Best Radio Show "VONYC"	Won
2007	Paul van Dyk	Best Website	Won
2008	Paul van Dyk	Best Trance DJ	Won
2008	Paul van Dyk	Best Producer	Won
2008	Paul van Dyk	Best Label "VANDIT"	Won
2009	Paul van Dyk	Best Trance DJ	Won
2009	Paul van Dyk	Best Producer	Won
2009	Paul van Dyk	Best Trance Track "Feat Johnny McDaid – Home"	Won
