= List of awards and nominations received by Axwell =

Swedish DJ Axwell, best known as a member of the Swedish DJ supergroup Swedish House Mafia, has received numerous awards and nominations. Among them include a nomination at the Grammis Awards, three nominations at the Grammy Awards, two Best House DJ awards won at the DJ Awards. He has appeared on the DJ Mag Top 100 DJs poll from 2006 to 2014.

== DJ Awards ==
The DJ Awards organizes the annual electronic music DJ awards event it is the only international ceremony for DJs and also the oldest, the awards are held once a year at Pacha club in Ibiza Spain it is one of the most important accolades an artist can win or be honoured by.

Axwell has won the Best House DJ Award 2 times and been nominated 4 times.

Year	Category	Work	Outcome	Ref.
2007	Best Newcomer	—N/a	Won	
2007	Special Award - Track of the Season	"I Found U"	Won	
2008	Best House DJ	—N/a	Nominated	
2009	Best House DJ	—N/a	Nominated	
2010	Best House DJ	—N/a	Won	
2011	Best House DJ	—N/a	Won	
2012	Best Electro House DJ	—N/a	Nominated	
2013	Best Electro House DJ	—N/a	Nominated	

== DJ Magazine top 100 DJs ==
Year	Position	Notes	Ref.
2006	93	New Entry	
2007	33	—N/a	
2008	29	—N/a	
2009	14	—N/a	
2010	10	—N/a	
2011	12	—N/a	
2012	23	—N/a	
2013	19	—N/a	
2014	29	—N/a	

== Grammis Awards ==
Year	Category	Work	Outcome	Ref.
2013	Best Composers	—N/a	Nominated	

== Grammy Awards ==
Year	Nominated work	Category	Result
2011	"Sweet Disposition" (Axwell & Dirty South Remix)	Best Remixed Recording, Non-Classical	Nominated
2013	"In My Mind" (Axwell Remix)	Best Remixed Recording, Non-Classical	Nominated
2013	"Wild Ones" (as producer)	Best Rap/Sung Collaboration	Nominated

== International Dance Music Awards ==
Year	Category	Work	Outcome	Ref.
2008	Best House/Garage Track	"I Found U"	Nominated	
2009	Best European DJ	—N/a	Nominated	
2011	Best European DJ	—N/a	Nominated	
2014	Best European DJ	—N/a	Nominated	
2015	Best European DJ	—N/a	Nominated	

== YouTube Creator Awards ==
- Axwell
  (223 thousand subscribers - May 2020)
