= Lost (Roger Sanchez song) =

Single by Roger Sanchez featuring Lisa Pure

from the album Come with Me
- Released: September 2006
- Genre: House
- Length: 3:49 (radio edit)
- Label: Stealth
- Songwriter(s): Roger Sanchez
- Producer(s): Roger Sanchez

Roger Sanchez singles chronology
| "Turn on the Music" (2005) | "Lost" (2006) | "Not Enough" (2007) |

Music video
- "Lost" on YouTube

"Lost" is a song by Dominican-American progressive house DJ Roger Sanchez, featuring Lisa Pure and Katherine Ellis. The song was featured on Sanchez's album Come with Me which was released in 2006. The song's melody is described as reminiscent of the 1980s, but with a tincture of a new romantic shading to the synth. The Song is a remix of a previous 2000 release by a group called Box Office featuring Stacey King on vocals, called "Just Leave me". Sanchez did two remixes of that song back in 2000

== Chart performance ==
The song reached number one on the Billboard Dance chart, Hot Dance Club Play and number 18 on the Hot Dance Airplay chart. It was also did well in the European charts as well. The song appeared in four European charts, Belgian Flemish Ultratop 50 Chart, Dutch Top 40, the Finnish Singles Chart and Spanish Record Charts.

== Music video ==
The video opens with a scene in a playground and children playing in it. The next scene breaks to a lonesome girl in a swing. The solitude of the girl is synchronized with the song's lyrics. Then the girl is seen on the top of a building near the playground. Apparently she is going to jump, only to be disturbed by the approach of a boy wearing goggles. The two share a passionate stare at each other and the video turns to an animation. The two take off the ground and fly about in the sky. Suddenly they crash into buildings, springing up from the ground and they start to free fall. The two go separate ways and the girl is saved by an angel. The closing scene shows that back in real world the girl is on top of the building and catching a feather falling down.

== Track listings ==
CD-Maxi

| No. | Title | Length |
|---|---|---|
| 1. | "Lost" (S-Man Radio Edit) | 3:49 |
| 2. | "Lost" (Roger's 12" Mix) | 8:35 |
| 3. | "Lost" (D. Ramirez Lost in Rave Mix) | 7:56 |
| 4. | "Lost" (The Cube Guys Vocal Mix) | 8:37 |
| 5. | "Lost" (Dan Coleman Vocal Love Remix) | 11:28 |

== Charts ==
=== Weekly charts ===
| Chart (2006) | Peak position |
|---|---|
| Australia (ARIA) | 60 |
| Belgium (Ultratop 50 Flanders) | 31 |
| CIS Airplay (TopHit) | 12 |
| Finland (Suomen virallinen lista) | 8 |
| Netherlands (Single Top 100) | 50 |
| Russia Airplay (TopHit) | 8 |
| Spain (PROMUSICAE) | 15 |
| US Dance Club Songs (Billboard) | 1 |
| US Dance/Mix Show Airplay (Billboard) | 18 |

=== Year-end charts ===
| Chart (2006) | Position |
|---|---|
| CIS (TopHit) | 148 |
| Russia Airplay (TopHit) | 170 |
| US Dance Club Songs (Billboard) | 46 |
| Chart (2007) | Position |
| CIS (TopHit) | 28 |
| Russia Airplay (TopHit) | 16 |

=== Decade-end charts ===
Decade-end chart performance for "Relax, Take It Easy"
| Chart (2000–2009) | Position |
|---|---|
| Russia Airplay (TopHit) | 47 |

== See also ==
- House music
