= Ruff Driverz =

British DJ / production duo Brad Carter and Chris Brown

- Also known as: 2000BC; Transit
- Origin: United Kingdom
- Genres: House
- Years active: 1998-2019
- Past members: Brad Carter; Chris Brown

Ruff Driverz were a British DJ/remixing/production duo consisting of Brad Carter and Chris Brown. The duo also recorded under the names 2000BC and Transit.

In the late 1990s, the duo scored six dance hits in the UK. Two of these were also major successes on the Billboard Hot Dance Club Play chart in the United States, where they were released on Tommy Boy Records. The flamenco-inspired "Dreaming" (featuring Katherine "Arrola" Ellis and credited as "Ruff Driverz Presents Arrola"), a top ten hit on the UK Singles Chart, peaked at No. 20 in the U.S., and "Waiting for the Sun", which was their highest charting record, peaked at No. 2.

Carter continues as a solo producer and remixer. Brown continues to organise, promote and book events and festivals in the UK and Europe. The act reunited in 2019 for a brief show with Ellis.

== Discography ==
=== Albums ===
- In-Fidelity (1999), Inferno

=== Singles ===
Year	Single	Peak chart positions		Album
Year	Single	UK	US	Album
1998	"Don't Stop"	30	—	In-Fidelity
1998	"Deeper Love"	19	—	In-Fidelity
1998	"Shame"	51	—	In-Fidelity
1998	"Dreaming"	10	20	In-Fidelity
1999	"La Musica"	14	—	In-Fidelity
1999	"Waiting for the Sun"	37	2	In-Fidelity

== "Don't Stop" single ==
"Don't Stop"

Single by Ruff Driverz

from the album In-Fidelity
- Released: 1997
- Genre: House
- Length: 3:29
- Label: Inferno
- Songwriters: Chris Brown; Bradley Carter
- Producers: Chris Brown; Bradley Carter

Ruff Driverz singles chronology
"Don't Stop" (1997)	"Deeper Love" (1998)

=== Track listing ===
- CD single, UK (1997)
1. "Don't Stop" (Eat Me Radio Edit) – 3:29
2. "Don't Stop" (Ballistic Bass Mix) – 7:01
3. "Don't Stop" (Scott Garcia Remix) – 8:27

=== Critical reception ===
Chris Finan from Record Mirror Dance Update gave "Don't Stop" five out of five, writing, "Pulse 8's new offshoot Inferno beats off hefty competition for one of the best house tracks around at the moment. Chris Brown & Bradley Carter produce a real cracker of a record that's been buzzing about in small numbers since November '97 and now boasts a Scott Garcia mix. It is still the original Deepah Mix that does the trick, with effortlessly good percussion, annoyingly infectious bass and a touch of vocal with an end result that is far stronger than many of its contemporaries."
