= Kabir Mulchandani =

Businessman, entrepreneur and philanthropist

- Born: 6 October 1972 (age 54); Mumbai, India
- Education: Stanford University, Phillips Exeter Academy
- Occupations: Real estate and hospitality businessman, philanthropist
- Spouse: Nadia Zaal

Kabir Mulchandani is an Indian-born real estate and hospitality businessman and philanthropist. He is the Chairman and Chief Executive of FIVE Holdings, which owns and operates luxury hotels along with The Pacha Group.

== Career ==
Mulchandani served at Baron International and Baron Electronics, two Mumbai-based, family-owned firms that specialised in the distribution and sale of consumer electronics.

In 2011, he founded SKAI Holdings, a Dubai-based real estate investment firm.

In 2017, Mulchandani changed his company's name from SKAI to FIVE.

In November 2021, Mulchandani and FIVE Holdings purchased the first ACJ TwoTwenty from Airbus and Comlux Group in Switzerland. The 16-seat jet consists of a dining table for eight passengers, a master suite, and a kitchen, with a full crew on board. The aircraft registered 9H-FIVE, to be pronounced "Nine-Hotel-FIVE" entered the market in May 2023. Combining a bizjet with FIVE hospitality and entertainment. In June 2023, The Guardian named the jet as a private "party jet".

== Personal life ==
In 2012, he married his second wife Nadia Zaal, one of the most influential Emirati women in the GCC, the couple have three sons and one daughter.

== Controversies ==
In 2009, during Dubai's financial crisis, investors alleged that Mulchandani had committed fraud as chairman of Dynasty Zarooni. Mulchandani was initially arrested and held for 140 days before he was permitted to post bail. At trial he was cleared of all criminal charges, and the court dismissed a civil case by Dynasty Zarooni's investors. Mulchandani later said that he believed some investors had knowingly filed false claims in order to get out of debts that would soon come due. In a 2011 interview he said that he was considering filing his own claims both against those investors and against news outlets that printed statements that he called "defamatory".

His legal battle with Viceroy over operator rights of the Palm Jumeirah hotel was highly publicized. Viceroy's termination took place on the same day Viceroy's UAE shareholders announced their plans to wholly own the company.
