= You Can't Change Me =

Single by Roger Sanchez featuring Armand Van Helden and N'Dea Davenport

from the album First Contact
- Released: 2001
- Length: 3:13
- Label: Defected
- Songwriters: Roger Sanchez; Armand Van Helden; N'Dea Davenport
- Producers: Roger Sanchez; Armand Van Helden

Roger Sanchez singles chronology
"Another Chance" (2001)	"You Can't Change Me" (2001)	"Nothing 2 Prove" (2002)

Armand Van Helden singles chronology
"Why Can't You Free Some Time" (2001)	"You Can't Change Me" (2001)	"Hear My Name" (2004)

N'Dea Davenport singles chronology
"Whatever You Want" (1999)	"You Can't Change Me" (2001)	"One Day My Love" (2006)

"You Can't Change Me" is the second single from Roger Sanchez's album First Contact (2001). The song features Armand Van Helden and N'Dea Davenport.

== Music video ==
The video, directed by Philippe André, shows a man chased in the street by the internet arrow. Clicking on him, it changes his environment and controls his life, changing time and space around him. It was shot over two days in Budapest, Hungary, and the 3D pixel effect was created by Framestore in London.

== Personnel ==
- Roger Sanchez – producer
- Armand Van Helden – producer
- N'Dea Davenport – vocals

== Charts ==
Chart (2001–2002)	Peak position
Australia (ARIA)	45
Belgium (Ultratip Bubbling Under Flanders)	10
Belgium (Ultratip Bubbling Under Wallonia)	3
Netherlands (Single Top 100)	78
Spain (Promusicae)	16
Switzerland (Schweizer Hitparade)	86
UK Singles (Official Charts Company)	25
