= Stealth Records =

Record label

- Founded: 2002
- Founder: Roger Sanchez
- Genre: Electronic dance music
- Official website: www.stealth-records.com

Stealth Records is an independent record label that specializes in electronic dance music, specifically house. DJ/producer Roger Sanchez founded Stealth in 2002.

In 2005, Stealth expanded into running its own events with a series called Stealth Live!. The events have grown into a recurring series of club parties in major electronic music markets such as the Netherlands, Germany, England, Spain and the U.S.

== Releases ==
Stealth has released music by the following artists:

- Add2Basket
- Agent Greg
- Alex Gomez
- Applescal
- Audiopunch
- Austin Leeds
- Avicii
- Axwell
- Baggi Begovic
- Belocca
- Benny Royal
- Blacktron
- Buset
- Carl Kennedy
- Carlos Silva
- Charles H. Brown
- Chris Moody
- Chus & Ceballos
- D. Ramirez
- D.O.N.S.
- Da Hool
- Daley Padley
- Danila
- Dario Nunez
- David Vendetta
- David Vio
- David West
- Dean Coleman
- DJ Colorblind
- DJ Dove
- DJ Kieth
- DJ Madskillz
- DJ Nick Corline
- Eddie Amador
- Eddie Thoneick
- Elio Riso
- Eric Kupper
- Filthy Rich
- Funkerman
- Gabi Newman
- Gabriel & Castellon
- Gregor Salto
- Greg Stainer
- Hardwell
- Interplay
- James Fitch
- Jason Chance
- Jeremy Sylvester
- Jerry Ropero
- Jesse Garcia
- Joeski
- Juice String
- Kid Massive
- Laidback Luke
- Le Knight Club
- Lex Da Funk
- Ludaphunk
- Marcoradi
- Mark Knight
- Martijn Ten Velden
- Martin Accorsi
- Medina
- Mephisto
- Michael Simon
- Michelle Weeks
- Midnite Sleaze
- Miguel Picasso
- Mitiska
- MLA
- Marcelo Oleas
- Muzikjunki
- Muzzaik
- Myu Myu
- Nari & Milani
- Nick Terranova
- Nicola Fasano
- Noir
- Pan-Pot
- Per QX
- Peter Gelderblom
- Phunk Investigation
- Pier Bucci
- Pillbox
- Pornocult
- Prok & Fitch
- Raffunk
- Rene Amesz
- Roger Sanchez / S-Man
- Sebastian Ingrosso
- SMOKINGROOVE
- Soneec
- Stefano Noferini
- Steve Angello
- Sueno Soul
- The Cube Guys
- The Nightcrawlers
- The Transatlatins
- Tiko’s Groove
- Tim Berg
- Tom de Neef
- Tom Stephan
- Tuccillo
- TV Rock
- Vibe Residents

== See also ==
- List of record labels
