= First Contact (Roger Sanchez album) =

Studio album by Roger Sanchez
- Released: July 30, 2001
- Recorded: 1997–2001
- Genre: House; disco house
- Length: 58:10
- Label: Defected; Dance Pool
- Producer: Roger Sanchez

Roger Sanchez chronology
Sessions Eleven (2000)	First Contact (2001)	Come with Me (2006)

Singles from First Contact
- 1. "I Never Knew" Released: August 27, 1999; 2. "Another Chance" Released: July 2, 2001; 3. "You Can't Change Me" Released: December 3, 2001; 4. "Nothin' 2 Prove" Released: March 4, 2002

First Contact is the debut studio album by American house producer Roger Sanchez, released in July 2001 by Defected Records. After establishing himself as a popular DJ and remixer throughout the 1990s, Sanchez decided he wanted to create more of his own music and record a studio album, feeling he had "a bit of a story to tell with [his life]." Conceiving the album to be a very personal "reflection of his life", Sanchez recorded First Contact over a four-year period. Music critics have described the record as a disco house album which displays a disparate array of influences and styles, including garage, Latin and electro. Numerous guest vocalists, including Cooly's Hot Box, N'Dea Davenport and Sharleen Spiteri, contribute vocals to the record.

Midway through the album's production, Sanchez released "I Never Knew" as its first single, a moderate hit. Upon the record's completion, he released the second single "Another Chance", which became a number 1 hit in the United Kingdom and a Pan-European club success. "You Can't Change Me" and "Nothin' 2 Prove" were also released as singles. First Contact was a moderate commercial success in the UK, reaching number 34. The album received general acclaim from most music critics, who felt that it merged different influences successfully.

== Background and production ==
Throughout the 1990s, disc jockey Roger Sanchez had been brought to a worldwide audience via his career as a remixer, but according to Dave Simpson of The Guardian, "[he] wasn't satisfied. Like many DJs, he wanted to be an artist. And he wanted to be the best. [...] If remixing had taught him one thing, it was how to make records." Sanchez conceived the idea of making an album when he found himself producing enough of his own material. He said of making First Contact: "I think for me what happened was that rather than initially saying 'Oh, I want to do an album', it got to the point that after years of just doing one off singles and remixes, I started producing a couple of my own tracks and I just felt I had a bit of a story to tell with my life." Although Sanchez had released several DJ mix albums and compilation albums in the 1990s and 2000s, including his then-recent Ministry of Sound mix Sessions Eleven: The R-Senal Sessions (2000), First Contact was the DJ's first studio album.

"He set himself the task of making an album as good as, if not better than Basement Jaxx's Remedy and Massive Attack's Blue Lines."

— Dave Simpson of The Guardian

With First Contact, Sanchez said he wanted to create a "very personal" album that gave listeners "a little bit of background about where I'm from and where my mind is at, plus some of my own experiences so people could relate to it and vibe with it." When Sanchez was asked by the NME why he had not made albums before, he replied: "I don't think the world was exactly waiting for a Roger Sanchez album." He started work on the album in 1997, despite having not written any songs since those he released as underground singles in his earlier days as a DJ. Upon its completion in 2001, the album had drastically changed from its previous form a year and a half earlier: "I just thinned it out, focused it and concentrated it more. I'm very happy with the outcome." The DJ felt the final album "reflects and expands on the sounds that have shaped his life."

Sanchez constructed the album's tracks "like a house." He explained: "Everything has a foundation and the track is a construction. The skeleton frames, the beams are the bassline, and you build it up around that. I often start with the drums, although recently I've started to subvert that, to challenge myself more, and start with, say, a melody. I treat every track as a problem that I have to solve." Production of the song "Another Chance" was initially an issue as Sanchez felt it needed vocals, so he sampled the 1982 song "I Won't Hold You Back" by rock band Toto after he found the Toto IV album lying in the studio. Despite never taking 'blatant' samples, he made an exception for the Toto track as "lyrically it just made the track and hit something I'd gone through." Tom Ewing of Freaky Trigger described the production of "Another Chance" as Sanchez "hearing something in the winsome intro of an old Toto hit, cutting it loose, and then letting this tiny scrap of song spin through seven minutes of house music." Upon completion, First Contact was mastered by John Davies at Whitfield Street Studios, London.

== Composition ==
First Contact, described by Sanchez as "a reflection of my life", is a lush and soulful house and disco house album, mixing smooth garage styles into a harder sound influenced by "fresh new beats" emerging from the United Kingdom and Europe. The album explores different styles and influences, including garage, electro and Latin music. Finding the album to be "conceptual in spirit" in a similar fashion to Erick Morillo's Subliminal Sessions (2000) and Romanthony's R.Hide in Plain Site (2000), Christian Ward of the NME described the album as a celebration of "the filter-disco 4/4 funk that stretches back though Static Revenger, Spiller, Braxe’n’Bangalter and Paul Johnson, to [Sanchez collaborator] DJ Sneak." However, the album does divert from the "4/4 furrow", notably on "Computabank" and "The Partee". Numerous guest vocalists provide warm vocals to Sanchez's music throughout the album.

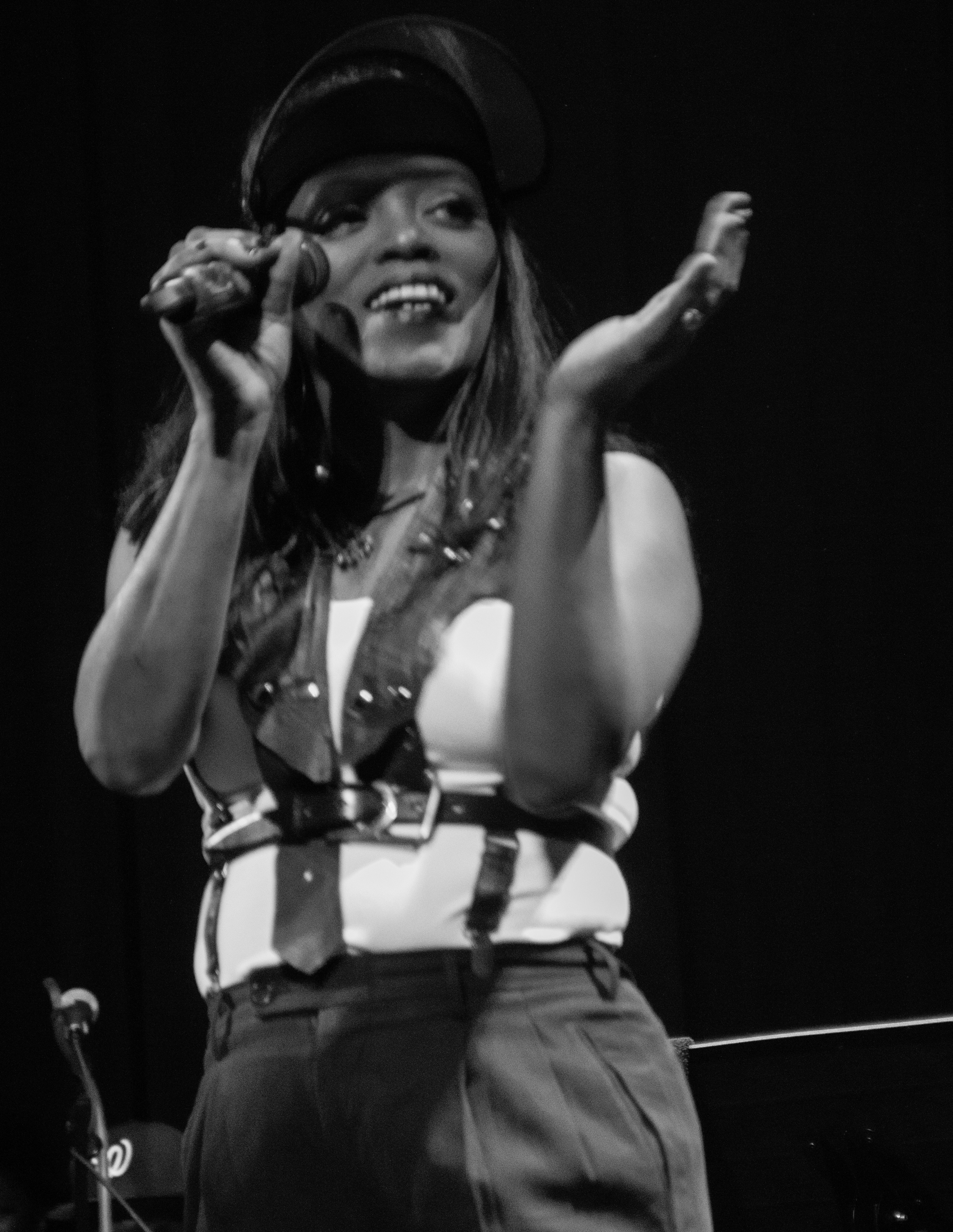
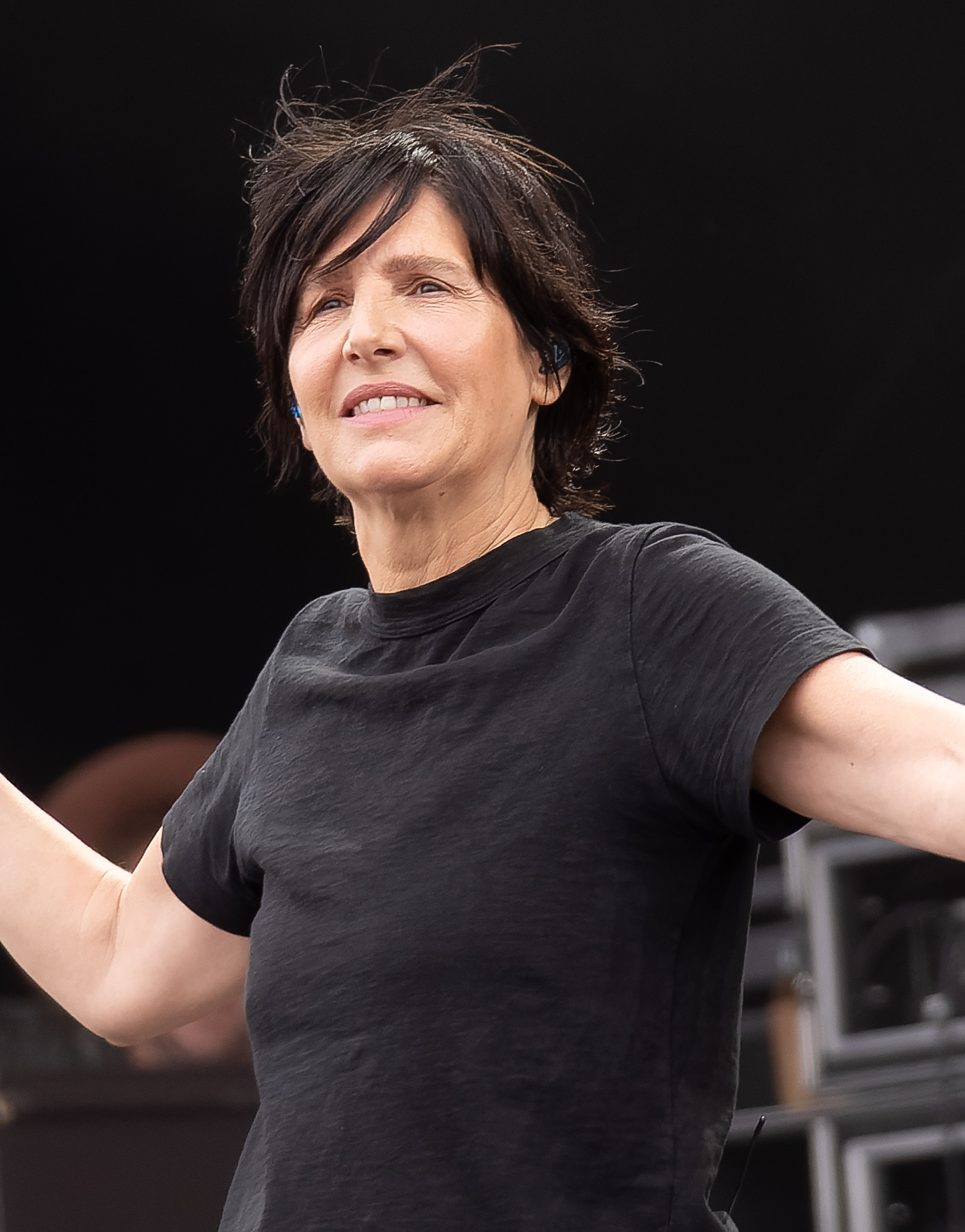
Guest vocalists N'Dea Davenport and Sharleen Spiteri.

A brief skit opens the album, in which Sanchez is heard logging on to his computer, which invites him "to select a track". This is followed by "Computabank", influenced by 1980s electronica acts like Depeche Mode and Kraftwerk, and incorporating styles of electro and industrial music. Julie C of Resident Advisor said the song gives listeners a taste of the style of electronica music "now filtering through their air waves" that had been adopted by Daft Punk. The emotional second track "Another Chance" features two hooks, namely the repeating vocal, sampled from Toto's "I Won't Hold You Back", and the double drum-hit "that kicks the track up a notch each time it comes." Ewing said of the song:

"'Another Chance' has an elliptical relationship with ‘song’, considers it an ingredient at best. There’s no progress here, just a series of gleaming, melancholy settings for the sample. But that’s the point – free of the unctuous baggage of the Toto song, the lyrics become a distillation of regret. “If I had another chance tonight / I’d try and tell you that the things we had were right” – over and over and over, a bubble of longing and missed opportunity, reaching for a resolution that can never now come."

"Contact" is a deep house track fusing throbbing bass sounds and flanged sampling work. The disco-styled diva house song "You Can't Change Me" is a collaboration with Armand van Helden and vocalist N'Dea Davenport, The lyrics were based on an argument Sanchez had with his ex-girlfriend: "She became my manager and it broke up pretty badly. My career, my music comes first, and I travel all over the world. This is how it is, so if you walk into my life you have to expect it. Don't try to change me." With lyrics like "You say I love my music more than you", The Guardian felt it "provides the greatest insight into the S-Man." "The Partee" is a big beat and house track driven by a brassy Latin music groove that highlights Sanchez's Dominican roots. "Ventura" is a 'formless' track based upon a chunky groove, followed by the disco-styled "I Never Knew", which features strings and "lite-funk" vocals from the group Cooly's Hot Box. "Nothing 2 Prove" is a laid-back song featuring vocals from Sharleen Spiteri of the group Texas. The genesis for the song came after Sanchez remixed Texas' hit "In Our Lifetime". Angela Johnson sings on the "electro soul" closing song "Leavin'", which features a classical-style overture introduction.

== Release and promotion ==
"I Never Knew" was released as a single by INCredible Records on August 27, 1999, midway through the album's production, reaching number 24 on the UK Singles Chart. After the album's completion, but prior to its release, "Another Chance" was released by Defected Records as the second single on July 2, 2001. It became a European hit, reaching number 1 on the UK Singles Chart and also reaching the top 20 across the rest of Europe. The song was also a club hit throughout Europe, featuring prominently in nightclubs, and, according to the BBC, it became "the tune of the summer". It was certified Silver by the British Phonographic Industry (BPI), indicating sales of over 200,000 in the United Kingdom. Two more singles followed, namely "You Can't Change Me" on December 3, 2001, which reached number 25 in the UK, and the vinyl-only "Nothin' 2 Prove" on March 4, 2002.

Michael Paoletta of Billboard magazine described First Contact as "hotly anticipated". The album was released by Defected Records in the United Kingdom on July 30, 2001. It reached number 34 on the UK Albums Chart, staying on the chart for three weeks. Sanchez found difficulty finding a licensing partner to help him release First Contact in the United States, due to potential partners being discouraged by the Toto sample in "Another Chance". The album was eventually licensed for release in the US by Musicrama, a Long Island City-based distributor that focuses on distributing imports into the American marketplace. Nanou Lambling, director of marketing/A&R for dance music for Sony Music Entertainment Europe, signed Sanchez in order to release First Contact for the rest of the world outside the UK, US and Ireland. First Contact reached number 23 on the New Zealand album chart, spending six weeks on the chart.

== Critical reception ==
Professional ratings
Review scores
Source	Rating
AllMusic	mixed
BBC	favorable
Billboard	favorable
Hot Press	mixed
NME	8/10
Resident Advisor	5/5 stars

First Contact was released to general acclaim from music critics. Julie C of Resident Advisor rated the album five stars out of five, hailing the album as Sanchez's return "to the dance/club scene" and describing it as "undoubtedly one of the best albums released this year." Michael Paoletta of Billboard magazine also hailed the record, writing that it effortlessly merges "sun-kissed beats" with "warm vocal stylings." The BBC commented on the eventual release of a Roger Sanchez album: "You can almost hear the collective sigh of relief going up from dancefloors across the land." They cited First Contact as the album in which house music finally had found a new direction, after the genre had been "going round in circles uncertain of which direction to take." The BBC's reviewer said the album was an "excellent hour's work, because when this hits the streets it will send shivers down the spines of inferior wannabes who have been polluting the airwaves with second-rate dance music."

Dave Simpson of The Guardian called First Contact "an extraordinarily absorbing record" that sounds "at once eerily uplifting and emotional, statuesque and clinical." In a positive review, Christian Ward of the NME described the album as "a brace of awesome disco-house soon-to-be classics," and commented that, while not innovative, the album proves Sanchez could repeatedly "hit a particular Ibiza-kissed clubfloor G-spot." More mixed in their assessments were Stephen Robinson of Hot Press, who felt the album "suffers somewhat in the 'long gestation period' department, and comes across as a hodge-podge of ideas and styles," and Tim DiGravina of AllMusic, who felt the first four tracks are strong, but wrote that the remainder are too repetitive and rely to heavily on guest vocalists. He commented that First Contact is "halfway to being an amazing album, but it's also halfway to being run of the mill."

Sanchez moved away from the style of First Contact on later works, reflecting in 2004 upon the completion of his second album Come with Me that his debut album was "a reflection of my life up to that point," whereas Come with Me "focuses on where I'm currently at and where I'm headed." "Another Chance" has continued to be popular in later times, with Freaky Trigger reviewer Tom Ewing later describing the album version of the song as "a clockwork miniature of momentum and regret."

== Track listing ==
All tracks written by Roger Sanchez, except where indicated

0. "Try" – 2:42 (hidden track in the pregap of the CD edition)
1. "Computabank" – 6:08
2. "Another Chance" (written by Roger Sanchez & Steve Lukather) – 7:32
3. "Contact" – 5:43
4. "You Can't Change Me" – 5:49 (featuring Armand van Helden and N'Dea Davenport)
5. "The Partee" – 6:03
6. "Ventura" – 5:53
7. "I Never Knew" – 6:52 (featuring Cooly's Hot Box)
8. "Nothing 2 Prove" – 5:15 (featuring Sharleen Spiteri)
9. "Leavin'" – 6:13
10. "Static" – 5:04 (Japanese edition bonus track)

== Personnel ==
- Roger Sanchez – writing
- John Davies – mastering
- Lost in Space – digital images
- Eva Mueller – Sanchez photography
- Gerald Elms – unspecified

== Charts ==
Chart performance for First Contact
Chart (2001)	Peak position
Australian Albums (ARIA)	59
Belgian Albums (Ultratop Flanders)	26
Dutch Albums (Album Top 100)	94
French Albums (SNEP)	114
New Zealand Albums (RMNZ)	23
Swiss Albums (Schweizer Hitparade)	62
UK Albums (OCC)	34
