= Another Chance (Roger Sanchez song) =

2001 single by Roger Sanchez

Single by Roger Sanchez

from the album First Contact
- Released: July 2, 2001
- Length: 7:33 (album version); 3:23 (radio edit)
- Label: Defected
- Songwriters: Roger Sanchez; Steve Lukather
- Producer: Roger Sanchez

Roger Sanchez singles chronology
| "I Never Knew" (2000) | "Another Chance" (2001) | "You Can't Change Me" (2001) |

Music video
- "Another Chance" on YouTube

"Another Chance" is a song by American house producer and DJ Roger Sanchez. The song is based on a sample of "I Won't Hold You Back" by Toto. Released in July 2001 as the second single from Sanchez's debut studio album, First Contact (2001), "Another Chance" became a worldwide hit, peaking at number one in Romania and the United Kingdom and reaching the top 10 in Denmark, Ireland, the Netherlands, Norway, Portugal, and Spain. Its accompanying music video was directed by Philippe Andre and depicts a young woman looking for love in the streets of New York City, carrying a huge red plastic heart.

== Background ==
In an interview with DJ Mag, Sanchez indicated that it was one of the last tracks he created for his album, thinking that the album needed a "good underground track." Sanchez had purchased several vinyl records at a store in Montreal, and one of the records was American rock band Toto's 1982 album Toto IV. When exploring sampling ideas for the album, Sanchez came across the hook "If I had another chance tonight" from "I Won't Hold You Back", which he sampled for "Another Chance".

== Critical reception ==
Michael Jørgensen of Radio Silkeborg in Denmark said of the song, "It's a great track, maybe not the most intelligent words, but the sound is very catchy. Once you've heard it, you can't get it out of your head!" In 2025, Classic Pop magazine ranked "Another Chance" number five in their list of "Top 20 No.1s That Owed a Debt to the 80s".

== Music video ==
The music video for "Another Chance", written and directed by Philippe Andre, is a short film with constant background noise and live dialogue playing over the track. Set at night in New York City, the short film tracks the story of a young woman (Kelly Hutchinson) looking for love. She struggles around the streets, carrying a huge red plastic heart. She attempts to make conversation with a number of passing strangers. Her big heart is met with odd glares by those that pass her by. Then, the accumulation of all the rejection makes her heart shrink down to a small size. A handsome man (Joshua Dov) then approaches her to ask her out for coffee, and in the following shot her heart is shown to have grown back to its original size. However, the next morning, the man sees the woman with her plastic heart restored to its original big size and walks away. The woman then continues her search for love. Andre ended up with a video that was longer than the radio edit, due to the inclusion of a long dialogue-only scene in the middle. The film was shot over two nights in New York City. The original footage was shot on 16 mm film.

The music video received a 20-year anniversary remastered re-release in association with Ministry of Sound in July 2021, coinciding with Sanchez's "Another Chance to Dance" tour. A special edition, collector's vinyl picture-disc was also released for the anniversary.

== Track listings ==
- UK CD single
1. "Another Chance" (original edit)
2. "Another Chance" (Afterlife mix)
3. "Another Chance" (S-Man's Dark Nite mix)
4. "Another Chance" (video)
- UK 12-inch single

A1. "Another Chance" (original mix)
B1. "Another Chance" (S-Man's Dark Nite mix)
B2. "Another Chance" (Afterlife mix)

- UK 2×12-inch single

A1. "Another Chance" (original mix)
A2. "Another Chance" (Miguel Migs Naked Time rework)
B1. "Another Chance" (Tom De Neef vocal)
B2. "Another Chance" (Tom De Neef dub)
C1. "Another Chance" (Mr G's Last Chance mix)
C2. "Another Chance" (Mr G's Last Chance dub)
D1. "Another Chance" (Dark Nite mix)
D2. "Another Chance" (Miguel Migs Mood Pusher dub)

- UK cassette single
1. "Another Chance" (original edit)
2. "Another Chance" (Afterlife mix)
- European CD single
1. "Another Chance" (radio edit)
2. "Another Chance" (Tom De Neef vocal mix)
- European maxi-CD single
1. "Another Chance" (radio edit)
2. "Another Chance" (Mr G's Last Chance mix edit)
3. "Another Chance" (Miguel Migs Naked Time rework)
4. "Another Chance" (video directors cut)
- European 12-inch single

A1. "Another Chance" (original mix)
A2. "Another Chance" (Tom De Neef vocal mix)
B1. "Another Chance" (S-Man's Dark Nite mix)
B2. "Another Chance" (Afterlife mix)
B3. "Another Chance" (radio edit)

- Australian CD single
1. "Another Chance" (radio edit)
2. "Another Chance" (Tom De Neef vocal mix)
3. "Another Chance" (Darknite mix)
4. "Another Chance" (Afterlife mix)

== Charts ==
=== Weekly charts ===
| Chart (2001) | Peak position |
|---|---|
| Australia (ARIA) | 20 |
| Australian Club Chart (ARIA) | 1 |
| Australian Dance (ARIA) | 2 |
| Austria (Ö3 Austria Top 40) | 30 |
| Belgium (Ultratop 50 Flanders) | 25 |
| Belgium (Ultratop 50 Wallonia) | 23 |
| Canada (Nielsen SoundScan) | 38 |
| Denmark (Tracklisten) | 10 |
| Europe (Eurochart Hot 100) | 5 |
| Finland (Suomen virallinen lista) | 12 |
| France (SNEP) | 33 |
| Germany (GfK) | 18 |
| Ireland (IRMA) | 9 |
| Ireland Dance (IRMA) | 2 |
| Italy (FIMI) | 16 |
| Netherlands (Dutch Top 40) | 6 |
| Netherlands (Single Top 100) | 20 |
| New Zealand (Recorded Music NZ) | 14 |
| Norway (VG-lista) | 8 |
| Portugal (AFP) | 5 |
| Romania (Romanian Top 100) | 1 |
| Scotland Singles (OCC) | 2 |
| Spain (PROMUSICAE) | 10 |
| Sweden (Sverigetopplistan) | 23 |
| Switzerland (Schweizer Hitparade) | 15 |
| UK Singles (OCC) | 1 |
| UK Dance (OCC) | 1 |

=== Year-end charts ===
| Chart (2001) | Position |
|---|---|
| Australian Club Chart (ARIA) | 6 |
| Europe (Eurochart Hot 100) | 74 |
| Ireland (IRMA) | 58 |
| Netherlands (Dutch Top 40) | 53 |
| Romania (Romanian Top 100) | 18 |
| Switzerland (Schweizer Hitparade) | 72 |
| UK Singles (OCC) | 40 |

== Certifications ==
| Region | Certification | Certified units/sales |
|---|---|---|
| New Zealand (RMNZ) | Gold | 15,000^{‡} |
| United Kingdom (BPI) | Platinum | 600,000^{‡} |
^{‡} Sales+streaming figures based on certification alone.

== Release history ==
| Region | Date | Format(s) | Label(s) | Ref(s). |
|---|---|---|---|---|
| United Kingdom | July 2, 2001 | 12-inch vinyl; CD; cassette | Defected | |
| United Kingdom | July 16, 2001 | 2×12-inch vinyl | Defected | |
| Australia | July 23, 2001 | CD | Sony Dance; Dance Pool | |

== See also ==
- List of Romanian Top 100 number ones of the 2000s
