= Soul Avengerz =

British electronic music group

Soul Avengerz is a British House music group. The group charted two hits on the UK Singles Chart and had a string of charting singles on the UK Dance singles chart. The group is made up of Paul Gardner & Wayne O'Connell.

== Biography ==
The group's "Sing" EP, featuring vocalist Angie Brown, reached #89 on the UK singles chart and #2 on the UK dance chart in 2006, their highest placement on the dance charts. They worked with Javine Hilton to produce the 2006 single "Don't Let the Morning Come", showing Javine's new music style, before she went from R&B to perform dance music. "Don't Let the Morning Come" peaked at #49 on the singles chart and #13 on the dance chart, making it their highest-charting pop hit.

== Discography ==
Year	Title	Chart positions		
Year	Title	UK	UK Dance	UK Indie
2002	"Comin' At Ya" (feat. Shena)	—	—	—
2004	"Love You Feel"	—	28	—
2004	"Enjoy Yourself"	—	—	49
2005	"Vintage Grooves Vol. 5"	—	39	—
2006	"Sing EP" (feat. Angie Brown)	89	2	—
2006	"Sounds Electric"	—	31	—
2006	"Don't Let the Morning Come" (feat. Javine Hilton)	49	13	—
2009	"The Trumpets Shall Sound" (feat. Butcherd Beats)	—	—	—
