= Mihalis Safras =

Mihalis Safras (Μιχάλης Σαφράς)
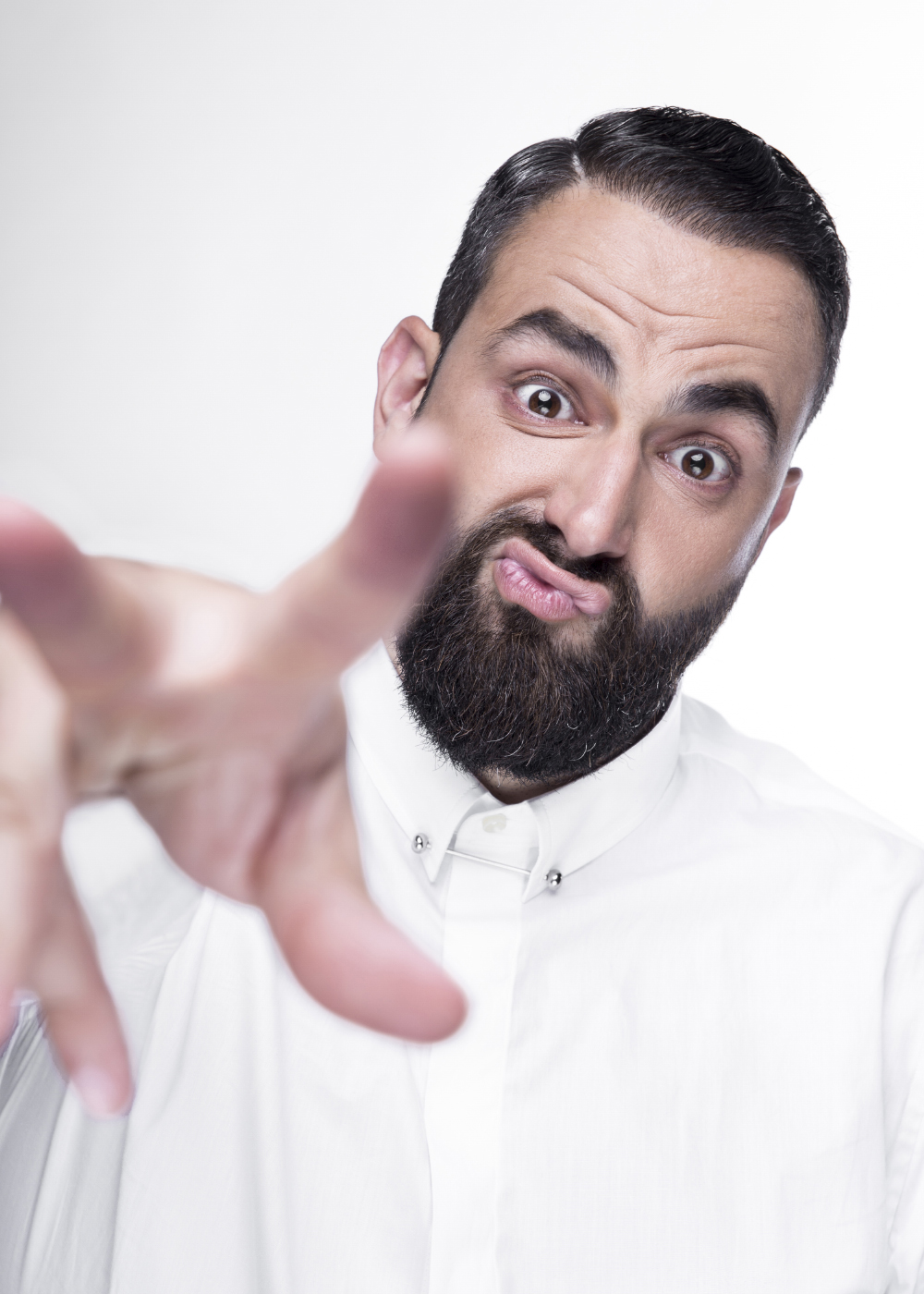
- Mihalis Safras

Background information
- Born: 5 October 1980 (age 44)
- Origin: Athens, Greece
- Genres: Tech House, Techno, House.
- Years active: 1996–present
- Labels: Universal Music Greece (2005-present), and Relief.
- Website: http://www.mihalissafras.com/

Mihalis Safras (Greek: Μιχάλης Σαφράς, Michális Safrás), is a DJ Award winner (2016), producer and club DJ from Athens. His style has been described as Tech-House and Techno with prog influences. He co-founded the Material Series record label with Mark Broom in 2006. Safras was nominated at IDMA Awards and at DJ Awards in 2016. Notably, Mihalis Safras' single 'La Samba' was used by Apple Inc. for an iPhone marketing campaign.

Online music retailer, Traxsource named him as Best Techhouse Artist of the Year 2015 and on 2016 he was on the same list on number #3. Nominations also at DJAWARDS and IDMA Awards in 2016.
