= DJ Awards =

Spanish electronic music awards

- Current: 22nd Edition DJ Awards
- Awarded for: Achievements awarded in the Electronic dance music industry
- Country: Ibiza, Spain
- First award: 25 September 1998; 28 years ago (as DJ Awards)
- Website: djawards.com

DJ Awards is a celebration of electronic music, and aims to recognise and honour DJs and individuals who have influenced electronic dance music worldwide.

Held annually in Ibiza at the end of the summer season, DJ Awards has retained the same ethos since its conception. The fundamental philosophy is not that of a competition, as we are dealing with an art form whose merits are purely subjective; therefore, no one can say which is the best. Rather, DJ Awards seeks to shine a light on key talents in the industry.

DJ Awards was formed in 1998 by José Pascual and Lenny Ibizarre. The ceremony is held once a year at a well known venue in Ibiza. Since 2018 the event has been held at Heart Ibiza. Previous editions were held at the Pacha club in Ibiza, Spain. The awards ceremony takes place towards the end of the Ibiza season. The awards are known internationally in the electronic dance music community as the Oscars of the DJ industry. The event attracts a broad selection of international industry professionals and the awards reflect the wide range of creative talent of the DJs. The ethos behind the annual ceremony is for it "to be seen not as a competition, but instead, a celebration of the electronic dance music scene, that conveys the artistic ability of DJs to a global music audience". A different theme is chosen each year that is important to the organisers, which is then translated into an individual graphical and visual representation of that theme for each ceremony. The awards have managed to retain their status as one of the most important accolades that an artist can win or be honoured.

Past winners have included Armin van Buuren, Carl Cox, Richie Hawtin, Roger Sanchez, Danny Tenaglia, Black Coffee, Solomun, Jamie Jones, Hernan Cattaneo, DjkMrpink, Stephan Bodzin, DJ Koze, Frankie Knuckles, Tiësto, Sasha, Tony De Vit, Deadmau5, and many more.

== History ==
In the inaugural edition in 1998, the chosen theme was “Alien Arrival”; this was due to the nature of the prize (a piece of kryptonite) and its extraterrestrial mascot "Snuffy". In this first year the winners were Erick Morillo for the "house" category, Daft Punk for the Best DJ Band category and Fernandisco for the "Radio DJ" category; an honorific special award was given to the late Tony De Vit.

The second edition in 1999 explored the theme of ¨African Tribal Rhythms¨, as a source of inspiration for music producers. It emphasised the expansion of categories such as "Ambient /Experimental" or "International DJ" and winners such as Pete Tong, Roger Sanchez, Basement Jaxx all picked up awards. Frankie Knuckles and Joe T. Vanelli were the first winners in the categories of "Outstanding Dedication" and "Outstanding Contribution" respectively.

The year 2000 hosted its third ceremony. This time, the ceremony's theme was ¨Mythological Inspiration of the Muses¨. There were also new categories; further, the category formerly known as "Ambient/Experimental" was renamed to "Chill Out" due to the increasing flow of productions in this style. Other categories and winners featured that same year were Paul Oakenfold for "Trance", Sven Väth for "Techno" and the song "Lady" by Modjo for the category "Track of the season" amongst others.

For the fourth ceremony in 2001 technological advances happening in the industry did not go unnoticed in the direction of the awards, establishing the theme "Man and Machine" as a starting point. For the second time Erick Morillo won "House DJ" alongside other winners: Mixmaster Morris for "Eclectic" and Carl Cox for "Techno", and Superchumbo the winner in the category for best production. The category of Drum and Bass was won by Peshay.

In 2002, the fifth edition of the awards, the theme was "Vinyl". It was created as a romantic example of the DJs' beginnings, at a time when the CD format was becoming the standard. Amongst winners that year were prominent names such as Pete Tong for "Outstanding Contribution", Mambo Cafe for "Best Ibiza Bar", "It Just Won't Do" by Tim Deluxe for "Track of the Season" or Wally Lopez as "Best Newcomer".

In 2003, the theme chosen for the sixth edition was "The Essence of the Universe"; winners included Steve Lawler for "Techhouse/Progressive", Junior Jack and Kid Crème for "Best Newcomer" (also winners for the "Track of the Season" with "E-Samba") and the crowning of Manumission as the best promoter, which gave a joyful note to this gala.

In 2004, the seventh edition was "The Sense of Man"; awarded DJs were Trevor Nelson for "Urban DJ", Tania Vulcano as "Best Ibiza Resident" and Shapeshifters with their track "Lola's Theme" as "Track of the Season". The gala had started with the opening video of "Made in Dixland: Searching Krypto" realised by the Spanish DJ and producer Nando Dixkontrol; this video turned out to be one of the most memorable images of the ceremony.

The ceremony of 2005 (eighth edition) celebrated the centenary of the "Vacuum Tube" creation, one of the first aspects of primary electronics circuits. Ferry Corsten for "Trance", Steve Angello as "Best Newcomer" and Cut Killer for "Hip Hop" were some of the winners featured, with a new Honorary Award being presented to Argentine DJ Alfredo Fiorito for his historic career in the industry, one of the most special moments of that year.

¨Nature¨ was the theme for the ninth edition of the ceremony, which was held in 2006. During the ceremony, Bob Sinclar was awarded twice, Once as Best House DJ, and another award for Best Song of the Year for "World Hold On"; he shared the latter with vocalist Steve Edwards. Other special moments of that year would be, after three attempts, the "Best Ibiza Resident" to the Australian Sarah Main with the highest votes in history for this category, and also the "Outstanding Contribution" given to Brasilio de Oliveira creator, among other things, of the party "La Troya".

The awards celebrated its tenth anniversary in 2007; its theme was "Time". Using the graphic reference belonging to the Salvador Dalís painting "The Persistence of Memory", the prizes were handed to the DJs Cristian Varela for "Techno", Mucho Muchacho for "Urban DJ", and David Guetta for "International DJ", amongst others.

The eleventh edition in 2008 celebrated the awards under the slogan "Do not change the climate, change yourself". David Guetta won for Best House DJ, Valentin Huedo won best Ibiza resident, and Mark Knight & Funkagenda won the "Track of the Season" for "Man with The Red Face".

The awards celebrated its twelfth edition in 2009; its the theme was ¨Dreams¨ as its subject. Once again the French king of DJ David Guetta won the "House" category, and Sven Väth for "Techno", Sasha for "Progressive House" and Michel Cleis for his tune "La Mezcla" as "Track of the Season" were some of the winners in a year that has included even more new categories.

For the thirteenth edition in 2010, the chosen theme was ¨Water¨, which urged everyone to join the onedrop organisation. Winners this year included the Swedish House Mafia boys – Axwell, Sebastian Ingrosso and Steve Angello – for the House category, Deadmau5 picked up best International DJ, International Festival was given to Kazantip amongst many others.

In 2011, the fourteenth edition of this ceremony, "fire" was the chosen theme, which represented the "discovery that changed the world". Among the winners were, Axwell for "house", for Tech house, Luciano took the award, Deadmau5 for Electro house and Carl Cox for Techno.

The 2012, and the fifteenth edition, saw light as chosen as the theme. Winners included Armin Van Buuren (Trance & International), Chase & Status (Dubstep/Bass), Maceo Plex (Deep House), Arty (Newcomer), plus in the Special awards collecting for (Ibiza DJ) Andy Baxter, Tomorrowland won (International Festival) and for Live Performance a new category Lenny Kravitz for his performance at the 2012 Ibiza 123 Festival.

In 2013, the theme for the sixteenth edition was the element of Earth. Winners presented with the Kryptonite award included Luciano for Tech House; Deep House went to Solomun. And Hot Natured for Electronic Live Performance. Cristian Varela for Techno, and Newcomer went to Uner. Armin Van Buuren who again won two awards scooping Trance and International DJ and Electro House went to Hardwell. The Lifetime Achievement went to Jerry Greenberg, and Outstanding Contribution went to Kathy Sledge (Sister Sledge).

For the seventeenth edition in 2014 the chosen theme was Love. Some of the winners included Carl Cox (who picked up two awards, one for Best International DJ and another Best Techno DJ), Skrillex (who won the award for Best Drum & Bass/Dubstep DJ), and Disclosure (whowon Best Live Electronic Performance). Some of the Special Awards given on the night went to DJ Harvey for his Outstanding Contribution to EDM, Best Ibiza DJ to Iban Mendoza and Track of the Season went to Patrick Topping.

In 2015, the eighteenth edition was held; the theme for the year was “Meet on the Beat”. Spanish DJ, Cuartero took the best Newcomer award, Hardwell picked up two awards in the electro/progressive house, and international categories. South Africa was voted best dance nation and South African DJ Black Coffee won the best breakthrough award.

The 2016 ceremony was the 19th edition of DJ Awards held on 3 October at Pacha Club. The theme for the year was “Let's Dance”, in tribute to David Bowie. Among others the new winners this year were DJ Anna from Brazil, Carl Cox, Black Coffee, Claptone, The Martinez Brothers, Matador and Mihalis Safras.

For the twenty-first edition held in 2018, the best Deep House DJ was the South African Black Coffee, the best Techno DJ was Joseph Capriati, the best Tech House DJ was Patrick Topping, House Master was Roger Sanchez (United States), Best Trance DJ was Paul van Dyk (Germany), best Newcomer DJ was Alex Kennon, best Bass DJ was Andy C., best International DJ was Carl Cox (England), Best House Artist was the English CamelPhat, Best Progressive House DJ was the Argentine Hernan Cattaneo. Argentina was also elected Best Dance Nation of 2018.

In 2019, the 22nd edition, the theme chosen was "Plastic No More". The best Deep House DJ was Maya Jane Coles (England), the best House DJ was Kerri Chandler (United States), the best International DJ was Carl Cox (England), best Progressive House was Hernan Cattaneo (Argentina), best Tech House DJ was Michael Bibi, best Newcomer artist was ONYVAA, best Melodic House & Techno was Maceo Plex (United States), best Electronic Live Performer was Stephan Bodzin (Germany), best Afro House artist was Da Capo, best Deep Tech was Butch, and best Trance artist was Aly & Fila (Egypt).

== Awards categories (competitive) ==
DJ Awards release every year online (via www.djawards.com) a list of categories and nominees which reflect the current electronic music industry. All nominees are recommended by a panel of 100 music industry professionals who are broadly representative of the International Dance Music sectors: music media specialists, DJs' managers, agents, promoters, technology manufacturers and DJs themselves. The panel changes annually, and it selects the nominees for each category within the DJ Awards. These are then announced publicly, and the public are then invited to vote through the organisation's website or via Social Media Networks to help decide the final winners at a gala event held in the world-famous club Pacha in Ibiza.

Current Best DJ categories

- Big room house
- House
- Electro house
- Techno
- Trance
- Tech house
- Deep house
- Bass
- Electronica
- Newcomer
- Breakthrough
- International

Live performance category

- Electronic

== Award categories (non-competitive) ==
The Special Awards is in a non-competitive category where nominees and winners are selected by a specialist panel of judges it is not open to a public vote and they operate much in the same way as the BAFTA non-competitive accolades these awards alternate and are not always given every year.

Current special awards

- Ibiza DJ
- Ibiza Club Night
- Ibiza Live Performance
- Track of the Season
- Producer
- Electronic Music Pioneer
- Record label of the Year
- International Festival
- Dance Nation of the Year
- Media
- Cutting Edge Technology

Highest Special Awards

- Honorific
- Outstanding Dedication
- Outstanding Contribution
- Outstanding Achievement
- Lifetime Achievement

== Previous award categories ==
Previous Best DJ/Best of categories

- Eclectic House
- Progressive
- Urban
- Minimal
- Innovator
- Radio DJ
- Band of the Year
- Ambient experimental
- Drum 'n' bass trip hop
- Remix of the Year
- Leader of the New Breed
- Chillout
- Drum 'N' Bass & Beats
- Psychedelic Trance
- Drum 'n' bass& Dub Step

== Category naming process ==
The organizers have renamed a number of awards that cover generally the same umbrella electronic music genre for example between 1998 and 1999 they introduced a category for Ambient Experimental DJ in 2000 the previous nominees from the former category then appeared in a new category for Chillout DJ, this category was dropped and a new one introduced for Best Eclectic/Experimental DJ until 2002 again some of the previous DJ's appeared in this category this then ceased and a similar new category begins called Best Downtempo and Eclectic in 2008. The confusion in the naming process selected by the organizers also appeared to happen for the musics genres bass, break beat, drum & bass and trip hop.

== Venue ==
Since its creation in 1998, up until 2017, the DJ Awards have been held every year at Pacha Ibiza. For the awards 20th anniversary, the ceremony was held at the newly opened Hï Ibiza nightclub. Since 2019, the awards have moved to Heart Ibiza.

== Trophy ==
The DJ Awards trophy is a piece of green Kryptonite. The word Kryptonite descends from the Greek Kryptos (secret or hidden element), as the force hidden behind the complex language of the turntables which generate vibration and feeling, and which the DJ guides the crowd into a state of consciousness high.

In an interview in the September 2007 with Spanish music magazine "Deejay", José Pascual co-founder of the awards, was asked why he chose kryptonite as the model for the trophy, and he replied, "I would say that she chose us. We wanted the trophy to be something else, something with meaning. We liked the idea that it would be of natural crystal and after a survey of people around us, we chose this for its energetic component, for transparency, for ease of transport ... Somebody thought it was like Superman’s kryptonite, the alien element that removed his power to give it to the DJ. Furthermore, the etymology of the word tells us that 'Kryptos' comes from hidden message and "Nite" from night, a message closely related to DJ, so organically everything came together"

== Mascot ==
The DJ Awards had a mascot named Snuffy, which is a cross between the famous symbol associated with acid house (the "bloodied" smiley) and an alien ("little green man"). Snuffy was retired in 2012 and the events have not had a mascot since then.

== See also ==
- DJ Magazine
- International Dance Music Awards
- Winter Music Conference
