= Roger Sanchez =

American DJ and producer (born 1967)

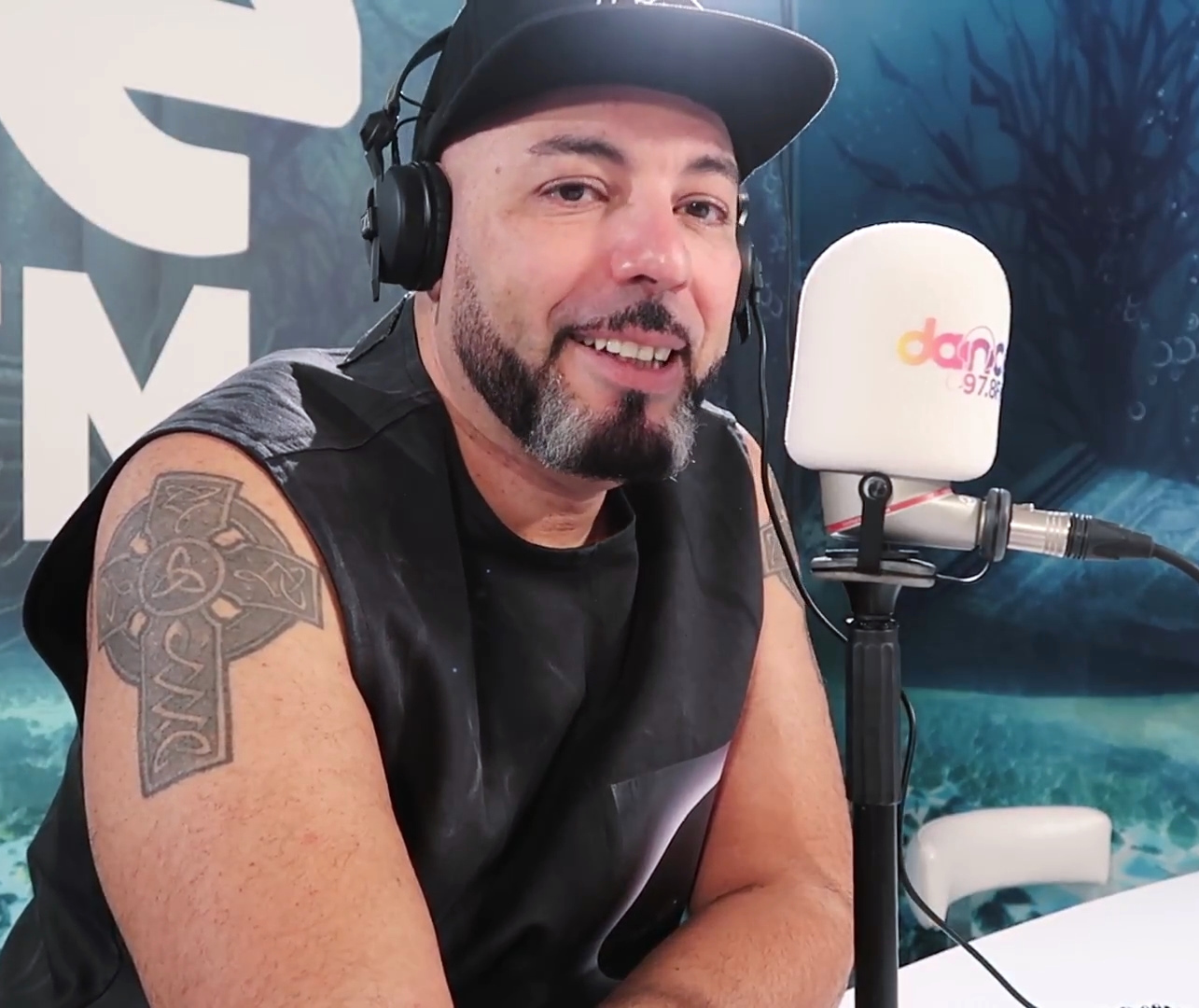
- Roger Sanchez at Tomorrowland 2018

Background information
- Also known as: Roger S., S-Man, Natural Born Lovers
- Born: June 1, 1967 (age 59); New York City, U.S.
- Genres: House, tribal house
- Occupations: DJ, music producer
- Years active: 1990–present
- Labels: Stealth Records, UNDR the RADR, Ministry of Sound
- Spouse: Kristen Knight
- Website: RogerSanchez.com

Roger Sanchez (born June 1, 1967) is an American house DJ, remixer and producer. He won a Grammy Award for his remix of "Hella Good" by No Doubt in 2003, and is best known for his song "Another Chance", which was an international hit in 2001. He is a four time DJ Awards winner for "Best House DJ" in 1999, 2002, 2004, and 2007 and has received twelve nominations in total. He won the first International Dance Music Award for Best Podcast in 2007 and has received 8 IDMA nominations for Best American DJ (2003–2010).

== Musical career ==
Sanchez began to play nightclubs in New York City, and later around the world. Along with fellow New York house DJs Erick Morillo, David Morales and Danny Tenaglia, Sanchez has become well known in the European club circuit, especially on the Spanish island of Ibiza. He has maintained residency on there every summer since 2000.

Sanchez has scored numerous hits in the European and World Charts with both his own music and the remixes he has created for an array of superstars including Diana Ross, Kylie Minogue, Daft Punk, Madonna, The Police, No Doubt and Maroon 5. In 2003, he won his first Grammy Award for Best Remixed Recording for his remix of No Doubt's "Hella Good". He hosts a weekly terrestrial and online radio show called Release Yourself, with 15 million listeners worldwide. Along with the radio show, Sanchez hosts a bi-weekly podcast, distributed internationally. In 2007 the podcast was awarded the first-ever Best Podcast Award at the International Dance Music Awards (IDMA). On December 21, 2020, the podcast aired its 1000th episode.

On October 28, 2009, DJ Magazine announced the results of their annual Top 100 DJ Poll, with Ultra Records Sanchez placed at number 60.

He is also the founder of his own label in 2002, Stealth Records. Yearly, Sanchez curates a series of compilation albums called Release Yourself, which are known for their blend of deep house, Latin, tribal and tech sounds.

In 2018, Sanchez created an educational masterclass to teach aspiring DJs.

== Discography ==
=== Studio albums ===
List of studio albums, with selected chart positions
Title	Album details	Peak chart positions						
Title	Album details	AUS	BEL (FL)	FRA	NL	NZ	SWI	UK
First Contact	Released: July 2001; Label: Dance Pool, Defected, Sony Music; Format: CD, 3xLP, CS	59	26	114	94	23	62	34
Come with Me	Released: September 2006; Label: Stealth, Warner; Format: CD, CS	—	—	—	77	—	—	—
Spectrum	Released: 5 June 2026; Label: Stealth; Format: Vinyl, CD, CS, digital download, streaming	—	—	—	—	—	—	—

=== Singles ===
Year	Title	Peak chart positions							Certifications (sales thresholds)	Album
Year	Title	AUS	BEL	FIN	NLD	SWI	UK	US Dance	Certifications (sales thresholds)	Album
1990	"Luv' Dancin'" (as Underground Solution)	—	—	—	—	—	—	—		Singles only
1995	"Strictly 4 the Underground"	—	—	—	—	—	—	—		Singles only
1996	"Release Yo Self"	—	—	—	—	—	—	—		Singles only
1997	"Deep"	—	—	—	—	—	—	—		Singles only
1998	"Funky and Fresh" (featuring Gerald Elms presents The International Posse)	—	—	—	—	—	—	—		Singles only
1999	"1999"	—	—	—	—	—	—	—		Singles only
1999	"I Want Your Love (remixes)" (Roger S. presents Twilight)	—	—	—	—	—	31	5		Singles only
2000	"I Never Knew"	—	—	—	—	—	24	—		First Contact
2001	"Another Chance"	20	23	12	20	15	1	—	BPI: Platinum	First Contact
2001	"You Can't Change Me" (featuring Armand van Helden and N'Dea Davenport)	45	60	—	78	86	25	—		First Contact
2002	"Nothing 2 Prove" (featuring Sharleen Spiteri)	—	—	—	—	—	—	—		First Contact
2005	"Turn on the Music"	44	31	5	29	—	197	48		Come with Me
2006	"Lost"	60	31	8	50	—	—	1		Come with Me
2007	"Not Enough"	—	—	—	—	—	—	—		Come with Me
2007	"Again"	—	—	—	—	—	—	—		Come with Me
2008	"Bang That Box!" (featuring Terri B!)	—	—	—	—	—	—	—		Single only
2011	"2gether" (featuring Far East Movement)	—	56	—	86	—	92	—		Release Yourself – 10th Anniversary Edition
2011	"Worldwide" (featuring Mobin Master and DJ Flipside)	—	—	—	—	—	—	9		Single only
2012	"Wrek tha Discotek" (featuring Soulson)	—	—	—	—	—	—	—		Blade soundtrack
2020	"Dream on Me" (with Ella Henderson)	—	—	—	—	—	—	—		Single only
2023	"Keep It Moving" (with Katy Alex)	—	—	—	—	—	—	—		Single only
2023	"Raining Again ('Black Rain' Remix)" (with Betoko)	—	—	—	—	—	—	—		Single only

=== Other releases ===
- Secret Weapons Volume 1 (1994)
- Secret Weapons Volume 2 (1995)
- Best of The Times (2007) w/ Todd Terry
- Release Yourself – 10th Anniversary Edition (2010)

=== Selected remixes ===
- Michael Jackson – "Don't Stop 'Til You Get Enough" (1992)
- Michael Jackson – "Jam"
- Tom Tom Club – "Sunshine & Ecstasy" (1992)
- Kenny "Dope" González Presents Axxis – "All I'm Askin'" (1992)
- Lisa Stansfield – "So Natural" (1993)
- M People – "Renaissance" (1994)
- Janet Jackson and Luther Vandross – "The Best Things in Life Are Free" (1995)
- Definition of Sound – "Pass the Vibes" (1995)
- Janet Jackson – "Love Will Never Do (Without You)" (1996)
- Jamiroquai – "High Times" (1997)
- Michael Jackson – "Dangerous" (1997)
- Jamiroquai – "Deeper Underground" (1998)
- Daft Punk – "Revolution 909" (1998)
- Lenny Kravitz – "Black Velveteen" (1999)
- Wamdue Project – "King of My Castle" (1999)
- Mylène Farmer – "Optimistique-moi" (2000)
- Garbage – "Cherry Lips" (2001)
- Alicia Keys – "Butterflyz" (2002)
- Anastacia – "Paid My Dues" (2002)
- Kylie Minogue – "In Your Eyes" (2002)
- No Doubt – "Hella Good" (2002)
- Texas – "I'll See It Through" (2003)
- Cirque Du Soleil — "Kumbalawé" (2005)
- Madonna – "Get Together" (2006)
- Robyn – "Be Mine!" (2007)
- Depeche Mode – "Perfect" (2009)
- Sérgio Mendes – "Pais Tropical" (2010)
- OneRepublic – "Secrets" (2010)
- Maroon 5 – "Give a Little More" (2010)
- Brandon Flowers – "Only The Young" (2010)
- Miguel Bosé – "Cardio" (2010)
- Robbie Williams – "Last Days of Disco" (2010)
- Seether – "Dragon in Me (Desire for Need)" (2014)
- Madonna – "Ghosttown" (2015)
- Nicky Romero and Nile Rodgers – "Future Funk" (as S-Man) (2016)
- Fiorious - "Follow Me" (2020)

== Credentials ==
- Featured in Hang the DJ by Marco & Mauro La Villa
  - Cannes Film Festival, France

== DJ rankings ==
The DJ List ranking

The DJ List has approximately 1 million members who rate DJs in different EDM genres, these are the statistics for The DJ List as of November 6, 2015.

Year	DJ	Country	Genre	Ranking source	Rank
2015	Roger Sanchez	(United States)	Top DJ USA	The DJ List	12th
2015	Roger Sanchez	(United States)	Top Global House	The DJ List	24th

Top Deejays ranking

Topdeejays is a global DJ database founded and operated by FM Agencija it uses an algorithm that measures general social media influence of a DJ by combining their Facebook, Twitter, Google Plus, SoundCloud, MySpace, Last.fm and YouTube fans, subscribers and followers TDJ calculates and applies TDJ points to in order rank artists global, national and by genre influence. These are the statistics for topdeejays as of November 6, 2015.

Year	DJ	Country	Genre	Ranking Source	Rank
2015	Roger Sanchez	(United States)	Top DJ USA	Topdeejays List	30th
2015	Roger Sanchez	(United States)	Top Global House	Topdeejays List	37th

DJ Rankings

The Official Global DJ Rankings is calculated according to an advanced algorithm compiled to give an accurate, independent and fair ranking of all DJs in consideration of the criteria of DJ earnings, media presence, chart data from music releases and remixes, airplay data from radio stations, public data about royalties collected from copyright associations, followers on major social networks such as Facebook and Twitter, and polling and rating data from various polling agencies and rating sites such as dj-rating.com and djmag.com.

Year	DJ	Country	Genre	Ranking Source	Rank
2015	Roger Sanchez	(United States)	Top Global House	The DJ Rankings List	1st
