= The Pacha Group =

Spanish holding company

- Type: Sociedad Anónima
- Industry: Entertainment
- Founded: 1967; 59 years ago Spain
- Founder: Ricardo Urgell
- Headquarters: Ibiza, Spain
- Owner: FIVE Holdings
- Website: pacha.com

The Pacha Group is a Spanish group of companies specializing in entertainment and hospitality, under holding company FIVE Holdings. It was founded in 1967 by Ricardo Urgell.

It is best known for its ownership of Ibiza nightclub Pacha Ibiza. Also among its portfolio of assets are Destino Five Ibiza Hotel and Pacha Hotel. The Pacha Group also owns merchandise brand The Pacha Collection and nonprofit The Pacha Foundation.

== 2023 FIVE Holdings Acquisition ==
In October 2023, Dubai-based FIVE Holdings acquired The Pacha Group for €302.5 million through a Green Bond and Revolving Credit Facility. The acquisition included various assets such as the Pacha Ibiza Nightclub, Destino Five Hotel, Pacha Hotel, The Pacha Collection, Toy Room, WooMoon and Storytellers. Additionally, the acquisition encompassed registered trademarks, including the global rights to the brand name "Pacha" and its logo design featuring two cherries.

Chairman and Chief Executive of FIVE Holdings, Kabir Mulchandani, assumed the role of Chairman of The Pacha Group. Aloki Batra, CEO of FIVE Hospitality, took on the additional role of CEO of The Pacha Group.

In March 2024, FIVE Hotels and Resorts launched Playa Pacha, at its beachfront resort, FIVE LUXE, located in Jumeirah Beach Residence (JBR), Dubai.

== Logo ==
The Pacha Group's first logo was inspired by Carmen Sevilla’s eye makeup. In the early 80s, Yvette Montsalvatge designed a logo for Guinda S.L. (Spanish for cherry), a company in The Pacha Group. The logo featured twin cherries and was printed on a large number of posters to announce events for Pacha Ibiza. The logo features on the majority of Pacha’s branding, from the Ibiza club’s facade, to the Pacha Collection - a range of merchandise.

== Pacha Ibiza ==
Pacha Ibiza opened on the island of Ibiza in 1973, six years after Ricardo Urgell opened the first Pacha club in Sitges, near Barcelona in 1967. Built in Ses Feixes and facing Ibiza Town, Pacha Ibiza was designed to resemble a Ibicencan farmhouse. In the 1970s, Ibiza was already gaining popularity as a destination for hippies and free spirits seeking a bohemian lifestyle. Pacha was included in The Telegraph’s round up of the "Best 11 Clubs in Ibiza", in June 2024, in which it was said the club “changed the clubbing landscape when it opened in 1973, not only on the island, but across the world”. In 2022 BBC News featured Pacha Ibiza in a broadcast for their Witness History series, called "The nightclub that changed Ibiza", in which it says "In June 1973, the nightclub Pacha opened in Ibiza, and it turned the island into a destination for music and party lovers from around the world".

Between the 2017 winter season and summer 2018, Pacha Ibiza underwent a major renovation, designed with the help of architect Juli Capella. British electronic music magazine Mixmag noted, “The booth is now located in the middle of the dancefloor, in the aim of making the club more in tune with the 21st century and placing an emphasis on the experience between the clubber and DJ”. This was followed by a further two refurbishments in 2019 and 2021.

Artists who have performed at the club include Pete Tong, Carl Cox, David Guetta, Claptone, Calvin Harris, Tiësto, Swedish House Mafia, Solomun, David Morales, Paul Oakenfold, Peggy Gou and Diplo among others.

Pacha Ibiza is also known for its residencies, where electronic music artists host their signature events once a week for the duration of the season. Past residents include David Guetta, whose F*** Me I’m Famous night ran from 2001 to 2018, and Swedish House Mafia. Summer 2024 included Marco Carola with his Music On night, Solomun’s +1 event, along with CamelPhat on Tuesdays, Robin Schulz at Pure Pacha on Thursdays and Blond:ish, who became the club's first ever female resident headliner in 2025.

Pacha Ibiza’s summer season also includes its Flower Power night, which began in 1981 and takes place every Saturday. In a 2023 article, The Guardian referred to Flower Power as the club's "earliest themed night". The event features guest DJs alongside resident Bora Uzer. A 2016 article in the Financial Times, also refers to "psychedelic lighting and go-go dancers on podiums". The event hosts special guest performances, with Grace Jones, Róisín Murphy and Boy George among those who appeared during the 2024 season.

== Pacha Hotel ==
In 2003, The Pacha Group acquired the hotel opposite Pacha Ibiza, El Hotel Pacha, now named Pacha Hotel.

== Destino Five Ibiza ==
Destino Five Ibiza underwent comprehensive refurbishment in 2025, which upgraded its rating from four-star to five-star.

== The Pacha Collection ==
The Pacha Collection is a line of fashion and lifestyle products featuring the twin cherries logo. The collection includes items such as clothing, accessories, fragrances and home decor.

== The Pacha Foundation ==
The Pacha Foundation was established as a private nonprofit organisation in late 2018 with the goal of consolidating and formalising the social welfare efforts initiated by the Pacha Group.

Following the acquisition of the Pacha Group by FIVE Holdings in 2023, Kabir Mulchandani, Chairman and Chief Executive of FIVE Holdings, took on the role of President of the Pacha Foundation, guiding its initiatives and impact.

== Awards & Recognition ==
Pacha Ibiza appears regularly on the DJ Mag Top Clubs 100 list, a poll which has been voted for by readers of the magazine since 2006. The club’s highest placement is #3 in the world. In 2025, it was #13 with DJ Mag calling it "an iconic nightlife institution".
