= Opus Dei (album) =

Studio album by Laibach
- Released: 23 April 1987
- Genres: Martial industrial; neoclassical dark wave
- Length: 37:17 (LP version); 58:60 (CD version)
- Label: Mute
- Producer: Rico Conning

Laibach chronology
Nova Akropola (1986)	Opus Dei (1987)	Let It Be (1988)

Professional ratings
Review scores
Source	Rating
AllMusic	4/5 stars
Encyclopedia of Popular Music	3/5 stars

Opus Dei is the third studio album by the Slovenian and Yugoslav avant-garde music group Laibach, released on 23 March 1987 by Mute Records. It features "Geburt einer Nation" ("birth of a nation"), a German language cover version of Queen's "One Vision", and two reworkings of "Live Is Life" by the Austrian pop rock band Opus'. The Opus song became the German language "Leben heißt Leben" and the English language "Opus Dei". "The Great Seal" is the national anthem of the NSK State, the lyrics taken from Winston Churchill's 1940 "We shall fight on the beaches" speech. A new arrangement of the song appears on Laibach's seventh studio album Volk (2006), with the title "NSK". On Volk, the song is credited to Laibach and Slavko Avsenik Jr.

There are two further connections with Queen's A Kind of Magic studio album. Although the drum loop in "Trans-National" is nearly identical to that in Queen's "Don't Lose Your Head", it is composed in fact from samples from the introduction musical theme from the Yugoslavian epic partisan film Battle of Neretva (1969), composed by Bernard Herrmann. The elements of "How the West Was Won" (specifically the rhythm and harmonised guitars) are inspired by Queen's "Gimme the Prize (Kurgan's Theme)".

The album was included in the musical reference book 1001 Albums You Must Hear Before You Die (2006). In 2023, Consequence ranked it at number 6 in its list of the "50 Best Industrial Albums of All Time". Al Jourgensen of the American industrial metal band Ministry named it one of the ten essential industrial records.

In December 2024, Laibach released Opus Dei Revisited, a "collection of new versions which radically interrogate the source material". The release consists of two complete versions, the first reworked by the band themselves and the second by Rico Conning, who produced and mixed the original album.

The cover picture is a reworked version of the Werner Peiner painting A Demon of the Hour (Terror) from 1944.

== Track listing ==
1. "Leben heißt Leben" (Live Is Life) (Opus) – 5:28
2. "Geburt einer Nation" (Birth of a Nation) (Queen) – 4:22
3. "Leben – Tod" (Life – Death) (Laibach) – 3:58
4. "F.I.A.T." (Laibach) – 5:13
5. "Opus Dei" (Opus) – 5:04
6. "Trans-National" (Laibach) – 4:28
7. "How the West Was Won" (Laibach) – 4:26
8. "The Great Seal" (Laibach) – 4:16

+ On CD editions, 4 tracks from Baptism:

1. "Herz-Felde" (Heartfield) (Laibach) – 4:46
2. "Jägerspiel" (Hunters' Game) (Laibach) – 7:23
3. "Koža" (Skin) (Laibach) – 3:51
4. "Krst" (Baptism) (Laibach) – 5:39
