= Also Sprach Zarathustra (album) =

2017 album by Laibach

Studio album by Laibach
- Released: 14 July 2017
- Genre: Electronic
- Label: Mute Records

Laibach chronology
Spectre (2014)	Also Sprach Zarathustra (2017)	The Sound of Music (2018)

Also Sprach Zarathustra is an album by NSK industrial group Laibach released on 14 July 2017. It was originally produced for a theatrical production of Thus Spoke Zarathustra, based on Friedrich Nietzsche’s philosophical novel of the same name, by director Matjaž Berger, which premiered in March 2016. The single "Vor Sonnen-Aufgang" was released from the album.

== Track listing ==
1. Vor Sonnen-Untergang
2. Ein Untergang
3. Die Unschuld I
4. Ein Verkündiger
5. Von Gipfel Zu Gipfel
6. Das Glück
7. Das Nachtlied I
8. Das Nachtlied II
9. Die Unschuld II
10. Als Geist
11. Vor Sonnen-Aufgang
12. Von Den Drei Verwandlungen

== Critical reception ==
Professional ratings
Aggregate scores
Source	Rating
Metacritic	80/100
Review scores
Source	Rating
AllMusic	4/5 stars
Mladina	5/5 stars
Sputnikmusic	4/5 stars
PopMatters	7/10 stars

The album was well received by critics. On the website of the collected reviews, Metacritic has an 81/100 rating based on 9 reviews, which means "general recognition". For Mladino, Veljko Njegovan rated the album with 5 stars, writing: "Laibach undoubtedly proves that on the symbolic level" has broken "many iron curtains, which lasts since the beginning of the eighties."

On Radio Študent, the album was ranked 8th, while on 24ur.com, it was ranked 2nd in the best Slovenian albums of the year.
