= Laibachkunstderfuge =

Studio album by Laibach
- Released: 5 May 2008
- Genre: Electronic
- Length: 79:19
- Label: Mute Records (Digital download); Dallas Records (CD)

Laibach chronology
Volk Tour London; CC Club 16 April 2007 (2007)	Laibachkunstderfuge (2008)	Gesamtkunstwerk: Dokument 81-86; (2011)

Laibachkunstderfuge (written as a whole word but sometimes dividing it with colors as Lai-Bach-Kunst-der-Fuge) is a concept album by NSK industrial group Laibach. The album is a reinterpretation of Johann Sebastian Bach's The Art of Fugue (Die Kunst der Fuge in German).

== Track listing ==
1. "Contrapunctus 1" - (3:07)
2. "Contrapunctus 2" - (20:52)
3. "Contrapunctus 3" - (2:54)
4. "Contrapunctus 4" - (5:17)
5. "Contrapunctus 5" - (2:46)
6. "Contrapunctus 6, a 4 im Stile francese" - (4:11)
7. "Contrapunctus 7, a 4 per Augment et Diminut" - (1:21)
8. "Contrapunctus 8, a 3" - (7:31)
9. "Contrapunctus 9, a 4 alla Duodecima" - (8:26)
10. "Contrapunctus 10 a 4 alla Decima" - (6:15)
11. "Contrapunctus 11, a 4" - (2:02)
12. "Contrapunctus 12, Canon alla Ottava" - (4:22)
13. "Contrapunctus 13, Canon alla Duodecima in Contrapuncto alla Quinta" - (4:46)
14. "Contrapunctus 15, canon per Augmentationem in Contrario Motu" - (5:22)
