= Laibach =

Slovenian music group

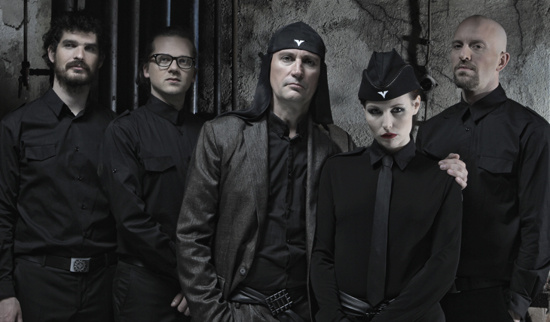
- Laibach in 2011

Background information
- Origin: Trbovlje, Slovenia
- Genres: Industrial; avant-garde; experimental; martial industrial; neoclassical dark wave; electronic; electro-industrial
- Years active: 1980–present
- Labels: Staalplaat; V2_Archief; Walter Ulbricht Schallfolien; Side Effects; Cherry Red; Mute; The Grey Area; Dallas; Abbey Road Live Here Now
- Members: See the members section
- Website: laibach.org

Laibach (German pronunciation: [ˈlaɪbax]) is a Slovenian avant-garde music group associated with the industrial, martial, and neoclassical genres. Formed in 1980 in the mining town of Trbovlje, Slovenia (at the time the SR Slovenia within Yugoslavia), Laibach represents the musical wing of the Neue Slowenische Kunst (NSK) artist collective, a group which Laibach co-founded in 1984.

From the early days, the band was subject to controversies and bans due to their use of iconography with parodies and pastiches of elements from totalitarianism, nationalism and militarism, a concept they have preserved throughout their career. Censored in Yugoslavia, receiving a dissident status and a cult following in their home country, the band embarked on international tours and gradually acquired international fame, which led to wider acceptance by Yugoslav public and to attention of the country's mainstream media. After Slovenia became independent in 1991, Laibach's status in the country has turned from rejection by a part of the public to promotion into a national cultural icon.

Early Laibach albums were industrial-oriented, marked by heavy rhythms and roaring vocals. Later in the mid-1980s, their sound became more richly layered, featuring samples from pop and classical music. The band's lyrics, variously written in Slovene, German and English, are usually delivered by the deep bass vocals of lead vocalist Milan Fras. Initially the lyrics handled war and military themes; later, the focus turned to any highly charged political issue of the moment, sending intentionally ambiguous messages. They recorded a number of cover versions of popular songs, often turning light melodies into sinister-sounding gothic tunes.

The band has seen numerous line-up changes, with Milan Fras (lead vocals), Dejan Knez (bass guitar, keyboards, drums), Ervin Markošek (drums, keyboards, electronics) and Ivan "Jani" Novak (stage effects) forming the best-known line-up. They have worked with a number of collaborators and guest musicians. During their career, Laibach have also recorded film and theatre music and produced works of visual arts, while the band members have embarked on a number of side projects.

== History ==
=== The beginnings: Laibach with Tomaž Hostnik (1980–1982) ===
Laibach evolved from the band Salto Mortale, formed by Dejan Knez in 1978 in the mining industry town of Trbovlje. Laibach was officially formed on 1 June 1980. The members chose 1 June as the official date of the band's formation as it was Trbovlje's official holiday, marking the 1924 violent clashes between Trbovlje workers and the Organization of Yugoslav Nationalists. The name Laibach, adopted after a suggestion from Knez's father, well-known painter Janez Knez, is the Austrian German name of the Slovenian capital Ljubljana, a name used during the period when Slovenia was a part of the Austrian Empire, as well as during the World War II occupation of Yugoslavia. Initially, the members of the band did not reveal their names, but during its initial phases, the band consisted of Dejan Knez (bass guitar, keyboards, drums, megaphone), Tomaž Hostnik (vocals), Ivan "Jani" Novak (stage effects, credited as "engineer of the human soul"), Andrej Lupinc (bass guitar), Srećko Bajda (synthesizer), Marko Košnik (synthesizer) and Marjan Benčina (synthesizer). In later interviews, the members stated that the band formation was sparked off by the suicide of Joy Division vocalist Ian Curtis, the death of Yugoslav president Josip Broz Tito and the beginning of the dissolution of Yugoslavia.

Since its formation, Laibach had been preparing a multimedia project Rdeči revirji (Red District), a piece intended to challenge and provoke the political authorities in Trbovlje. The project was scheduled to be presented in the Workers' Hall in Trbovlje. However, the group's use of Kazimir Malevich's black crosses on their posters was determined by the authorities to be "improper and irresponsible", leading to considerable negative reaction in the media and the cancellation of the performance of Red District.

Laibach logo

The band's first live appearance and an exhibition entitled Žrtve letalske nesreče (Victims of an Air Accident) took place in January 1982 at the Ljubljana club FV. It was followed by performances in Zagreb, in Lapidarij club, and in Belgrade, in Students' Cultural Center's foyer. For their live performances they used gramophones, radio devices and electronic instruments that they had built themselves, and the group's musical style was characterized by the Yugoslav music press as industrial rock. Instead of dry ice as a source of theatrical smoke, the group used original military smoke bombs, which was as unpleasant for themselves as for the audience. At a concert in Belgrade, the smoke forced part of the audience to escape through the venue's windows. In Zagreb, the use of smoke bombs on stage caused a search of the band's equipment conducted by the Yugoslav People's Army. The band stated that they used smoke bombs because they were "dealing with military subjects", which satisfied the officers in charge of the search. At this early stage of their career, Laibach's visuals employed mining iconography; eventually, the group would add such symbols as Triglav, deer horns and the Malevich's black cross encircled with a gear to their imagery.

At the time of their concerts in Ljubljana, Belgrade and Zagreb, the name Laibach and the posters with black crosses caused controversy, with some seeing this as a direct reference to the occupation of the country in World War II. The newspaper Delo published a reader's letter which stated: "Is it possible that someone has allowed in Ljubljana, the first Yugoslav city to be awarded the Order of the People's Hero, some youth group to carry a name which forcibly tries to revoke [sic] the name Laibach?". The band used this question as the opening for their performance on the Novi rock (New Rock) festival in Ljubljana, held on 10 September 1982. For their performance at the festival, frontman Tomaž Hostnik wore a military uniform, and despite being hit in the face by a bottle, causing him serious injuries, managed to bring the performance to an end. A part of the Yugoslav music press described the concert as the "symbolic end of punk rock".

On 11 December 1982, at the YU Rock Moment festival in Zagreb, the band held the performance entitled Dotik zla (Touch of Evil). It was Hostnik's last performance with Laibach. Ten days later, he committed a ritual suicide by hanging himself from a hayrack—one of the Slovenian national symbols—near his hometown of Medvode. Laibach disapproved of his act of suicide and posthumously "expelled" Hostnik from the group. Despite this, the group would in the future often refer to him and dedicate various projects to him, including an installation entitled Apologia Laibach, created around Hostnik's self-portrait.

=== Dissident status in Yugoslavia (1983–1985) ===
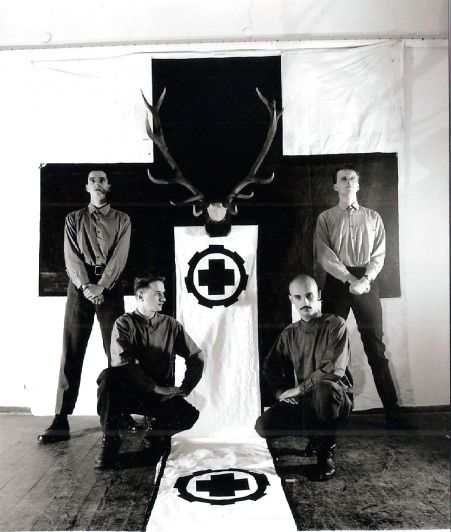
Laibach in 1983

The group resumed its activities at the beginning of 1983, when they held an exhibition in the Prošireni mediji (Expanded Media) gallery in Zagreb. After a number of complaints, the management of the gallery attempted to persuade members of Laibach to remove part of the pieces, which they refused, and only four days after the opening, the management decided to close the exhibition. The band continued their concert activities with the vocalist Milan Fras. The group held a concert in Ljubljana's Freedom Hall, featuring guest performances by the English bands Last Few Days and 23 Skidoo. The 30-minutes long recording of dogs barking and snarling were used as the concert intro. The day after the performance, the group received considerable media coverage for a concert at the Zagreb Biennale entitled Mi kujemo bodočnost (We Forge the Future), during which the group used simultaneous projections of the propaganda film Revolucija še traja (The Revolution is Still Going On) and a pornographic film. After the simultaneous appearance of late Josip Broz Tito and a penis on the screens, the performance was interrupted by the police, and the members of the band were forcibly removed from the stage.

Following the performance at the Zagreb Biennale, the band published their "manifesto", entitled "Akcija v imenu" ("Action in the Name Of"), in the Nova revija literary magazine, largely thanks to Taras Kermauner, a philosopher, literary historian and one of the magazine editors. In the "manifesto" the band quoted Stalin ("Artists are engineers of the human soul") and Hitler ("Art is sublime, leading to fanaticism"). The subsequent debut television appearance on 23 June 1983, in the informative-political program TV tednik (TV Weekly), caused major negative reactions by the public. The members of the band appeared in the program sitting motionlessly, wearing army uniforms and armbands with black crosses. The host of TV tednik Jure Pengov stated: "Maybe now someone will react and ban, exterminate this danger, these horrible ideas and beliefs". After Laibach's appearance in TV tednik, they were officially banned from using the name Laibach on their records and live appearances, the decision even being printed in the Official Gazette of SR Slovenia. The scandal even led to some of the group members hiding in Pleterje Charterhouse for a short period of time.

The group then, together with Last Few Days, started the international Occupied Europe Tour '83, which included sixteen dates in eight West European and Eastern Bloc countries. The performances provoked a lot of interest in the European media, especially with the band's totalitarian musical and visual style. The socialist background, effective live appearances and a dissident status in their home country provided the group with a swift increase of interest in the Western countries. By combining the imagery of socialist realism, Nazism—which provoked the Slovene WW2 Veteran Organization in Yugoslavia—and Italian futurism, the group created a unique aesthetic style which could not pass unnoticed by the public. In Poland, they provoked the public by declaring themselves the sympathizers of Wojciech Jaruzelski. The statement provoked someone to present them with feces rolled into newspapers during the press conference in Warsaw. At the time of the tour, the song lyrics were mostly in German, but having included cover versions of English language songs, the group would start focusing more on the latter.

In 1984, the band members moved to Great Britain, where they worked as labourers in London, worked at a pier in Belfast and appeared as extras in Stanley Kubrick's Full Metal Jacket. Through the Belgian record label L.A.Y.L.A.H. Anitrecords, the group released their debut record, a 12" single with Slovene language songs "Boji" ("Fights"), "Sila" ("Force") and "Brat moj" ("My Brother"). At the time, the band also appeared on the various artists album World National Anthems released by TRAX International, with their version of the Yugoslav national anthem "Hej, Sloveni". The band returned to Yugoslavia to prepare an exhibit at Ljubljana's Students' Cultural Center, entitled The Occupied Europe Tour Documents, which opened on 5 May 1984. Simultaneously, the band released the live audio cassette Vstajenje v Berlinu (Resurrection in Berlin).

On 7 October 1984, Laibach officially founded the informal art collective Neue Slowenische Kunst (German for New Slovene Art) with visual arts group IRWIN and Scipion Nasice Sisters and Rdeči Pilot (Red Pilot) theatre groups. They were later joined by Novi kolektivizam (New Collectivism) design studio, Graditelji (Builders) architecture bureau, Retrovizija (Retrovision) film group and the Odeljenje za čisto in praktično filozofijo (Section for Clean and Practical Philosophy) group. The band also started two musical side projects, Germania and 300.000 V.K. On 21 December 1984, Laibach held a concert dedicated to the late Hostnik at the Malči Belič Hall in Ljubljana. Due to the fact that they were still banned from using the name Laibach, they announced the concert with posters featuring only a black cross, the initials of the hall, and date and time of the concert.

The following year, the group released their debut studio album, Laibach, through the Ljubljana Students' Cultural Center's label Ropot. Due to the ban of the name Laibach, the cover featured the group's trademark black cross without any text. On one of the album tracks, the band used a sample from a speech by Josip Broz Tito, however, it was removed by the state censors. During the same year, the German label WUS released Laibach compilation album Rekapitulacija 1980–1984 (Recapitulation 1980–1984). The recording of their performance at the Neu Konservatiw festival in Hamburg on 15 June 1985 was released on the live album Neu Konservatiw. At the end of the year, the band once more held a number of performances in West Germany, this time under the title Die erste bombardierung – Laibach über dem Deutschland (The First Bombing – Laibach Over Germany). The concerts featured hunting imagery, like axes and trophy antlers, and during the concerts, the band members sawed wood on stage, surrounded by live tranquilized rabbits.

On 6 February 1986, with the Scipion Nasice Sisters Theatre, the group premiered their own play Krst pod Triglavom (Baptism Under Triglav) at the Ljubljana's Cankar Hall. The performance was followed by a round table about the ban of the name Laibach, organized in Ljubljana. The discussion featured academics, representatives of political organizations and authorities, including the president of the Assembly of the City of Ljubljana Tina Tomlje. In a TV interview, Tomlje stated that she was informed of the quality of the band's works and of the success they had achieved abroad, but that they would not be allowed to perform in Ljubljana under the name Laibach. Soon after, the group released their second studio album, Nova Akropola (The New Acropolis), via British independent record label Cherry Red Records. After the album release, the League of Socialist Youth of Slovenia on their 12th congress demanded the ban on the usage of the name Laibach to be lifted. The ban was officially lifted on 4 April 1985, and the group performed their first legal concert in Slovenia under the name Laibach already on the following day, in Hum, entitled Krvava gruda, plodna zemlja (Bloody Land, Fertile Soil). On the Yugoslav Youth Day, the League of Socialist Youth of Slovenia awarded Neue Slowenische Kunst with a plaque, and the League's official magazine Mladina awarded the collective with the Zlata ptica (The Golden Bird) award.

=== International breakthrough, acceptance and wide popularity in Yugoslavia (1986–1991) ===
Laibach's following release was the live album The Occupied Europe Tour 1985, featuring a selection of recordings from their concerts in Ljubljana, Hamburg and London. In June 1986, the band held four concerts in England, the mini-tour being entitled Laibach Over America. During their staying in London, they recorded three songs for a John Peel session, and performed with the Michael Clark dance company in London and Manchester, in the company's play No Fire Escape from Hell. On 10 October 1986, the group performed in Graz, Austria, on the festival entitled Concert for the Abolishment of Fascist Trade Unions.

Having signed for Mute Records, Laibach started recording their third studio album, Opus Dei, working with composer Slavko Avsenik Jr. The inner sleeve of the cover featured a swastika consisting of four bloodied axes designed by John Heartfield, an anti-Nazi artist. The record was sold secretly in some European countries, as the meaning of the cover was not recognized. The group achieved commercial success with the cover versions of "Live Is Life" by Opus, entitled "Life Is Life", and "One Vision" by Queen, entitled "Geburt einer Nation" ("Birth of a Nation"), which would mark the direction of their future releases. The track "How the West Was Won" was also well-received by the audience. The usage of the name Opus Dei caused the Catholic institution of the same name to sue the group, but the case was eventually decided in favor of Laibach. Following the album release, the group embarked on the United States of Europe Tour, during which they stated at a press conference in France that their influences are Tito, Toto, and Tati. On 7 April 1987, they recorded three more songs for a John Peel session. During May, they once again performed in Clark's company No Fire Escape from Hell play, in Brighton and Leicester. On 28 July, they presented the work of Neue Slowenische Kunst at the London International Festival of Theatre. With Clark's company they performed in Los Angeles, holding three performances in September 1987. In the United States they were invited to a reception hosted by the British ambassador. They appeared on the reception wearing their uniforms, and the actor Walter Gotell (known for his role of General Gogol in James Bond film series), who was also present on the reception, saw this as a provocation. In Yugoslavia, the play was performed at the Belgrade International Theatre Festival, however, performance by Laibach and Tito's speeches were omitted. In September 1987, the band also performed in Hamburg's Deutsches Schauspielhaus production of Macbeth, for which they also wrote the music. The music from the play would be released two years later on the album Macbeth.

In Yugoslavia, Opus Dei was released in November 1987 by the state-owned major label ZKP RTLJ. The release was followed by the double album Krst pod Triglavom – Baptism, featuring the music from the play of the same title. The members of the band were invited to a meeting with Jože Osterman, Secretary of the League of Socialist Working People of Ljubljana, who tried to persuade them to change their name to Ljubljana, as, despite the lifting of the ban on the name Laibach, the group's name still sparked occasional controversies in their home country. Despite them, the band held a sold-out concert in Ljubljana entitled Svoji ka svojim (To Their Own), and Yugoslav lifestyle and entertainment magazine Start pronounced members of the group the fourth on the list of Best Dressed Men in Yugoslavia. After the performance in Ljubljana, the band went on another European tour, during which they appeared at the end of every concert with horned helmets. On their performance at the Vienna Festival, they provoked the audience with the intro: "Austrians, You Are Germans", which almost forced organizers to interrupt the concert. Their performance in Amsterdam was a part of European Capital of Culture program. During the band's performance on a five-meter–high stage, the performance crew roasted an ox on a stake on the hall's balcony.

In October 1988, the group released the album Let It Be, featuring cover versions of all the songs from the Beatles album of the same name, with the exception of the title track, which they did not record owing to lack of studio time, and "Maggie Mae"; under the title "Maggie Mae", the band released their versions of German folk songs "Auf der Lüneburger Heide" and "Was Gleicht Wohl Auf Erden". Their version of "Across the Universe" featured Anja Rupel of the Ljubljana-based synth-pop band Videosex on vocals. A part of the recorded material from the album would be broadcast by Paul McCartney before his concerts.

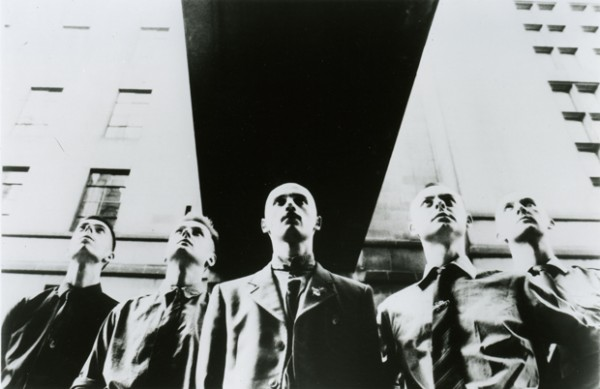
Laibach in 1989

In 1989, the band went on a North American tour. On their concert in Toronto, they were joined by Austrian artist and art theoretician Peter Weibel, who appeared on stage half-naked with a horned helmet on his head. After their return from North America, they went on a Yugoslav tour, starting with a sold-out concert in Ljubljana's Tivoli Hall. Their performance in Zagreb started with the traditional Serbian instrument gusle, and in Belgrade, the NSK philosopher Peter Mlakar held a speech which was a cynical parody of Slobodan Milošević's speeches in SAP Kosovo.

The following year, the group released Sympathy for the Devil, an album of different cover versions of the Rolling Stones song of the same name. The release was followed by European and North American tour. Upon returning to Yugoslavia, the group embarked on a tour across industrial regions of Slovenia. Their concert in Šentjurje was visited by only five people due to poor promotion, but the band nevertheless performed the whole set. The band celebrated their tenth anniversary with a concert held on 21 December 1990 in Trbovlje, at the town's thermal power station, which was their first concert in their hometown. At -15°C, the visitors of the concerts were welcomed by a brass band and majorettes. 16 years later Chris Bohn of The Wire magazine proclaimed this show as one of the 60 most powerful concerts of all time. After this concert, the group undertook a tour of Bosnia and Herzegovina.

=== Slovenian independence and beyond: new releases and new controversies (1991–present) ===
In 1992, the group released Kapital, an album dealing with materialism in contemporary society. The band released the album on vinyl record, audio cassette and compact disc, recording different versions of the same songs for each format of the album. During the same year, they proclaimed the State of NSK, promoting its flag, money, postage stamps and passports. The following year, Mute Records released the Ljubljana–Zagreb–Beograd live album, featuring recordings from the 1982 concerts in the three cities, presenting a document of politically active rock from the group's early career, especially with the songs "Tito-Tito", "Država" ("The State"), and "Rdeči molk" ("Red Silence").

In 1994, they released the album NATO, which commented on the current political events in Eastern Europe, former Yugoslavia and the actions of the NATO pact, filtered through their blend of techno and pop. The album featured cover versions of Europe's "The Final Countdown", Bolland & Bolland's "In the Army Now", Don Fardon's "Indian Reservation" (renamed to "National Reservation"), and Stanislav Binički's composition "Marš na Drinu" ("March on the Drina"). During the same year, the band also recorded the song "Zrcalo sveta (Das Spiegelglas der Welt)" ("Mirror of the World") for the Kraftwerk tribute album Trans Slovenia Express, featuring songs by Slovenian acts. The group went on the Occupied Europe NATO Tour 1994-95, provoking the audience in Zagreb and Sarajevo with their performances of "Marš na Drinu", a Serbian World War I patriotic march. The tour resulted in the box set comprising a live CD and a VHS tape, which featured a selection of recordings from the two-year tour, including the performance in Sarajevo on the date of the signing of the Dayton Agreement. In 1995, the group for a while considered splitting into several simultaneous lineups so that they could perform in different places at the same time, but the idea was abandoned.

The following year, the group released Jesus Christ Superstars, featuring their version of Andrew Lloyd Webber's rock opera Jesus Christ Superstar. The group promoted the album in the United States with an eighteen-date tour, followed by a tour across Germany. On 15 May 1997, the band performed with the Slovenian Symphony Orchestra, conducted by Marko Letonja, and the Tone Tomšič Choir, for the opening ceremony of the Ljubljana European Month of Culture, presenting orchestral versions of their earliest material, which they rarely performed live, arranged by Uroš Rojko and Aldo Kumar with the members of the group. During the same year, the live album M.B. 21 December 1984 was released, featuring recordings from the 1984 secret concert in Ljubljana's Malči Belič Hall, the February 1985 concert at the Berlin Atonal festival, and the April 1985 performance at the Zagreb club Kulušić. The performances had featured guest appearance by Jože Pegam on clarinet and trumpet, and some songs included samples of Tito's speeches. On 14 November 1997, at a concert in Belgrade, another Peter Mlakar speech received a decidedly mixed audience reaction, in which he asked the audience to "eat the pig and digest it once and for all", referring to the then-president of the Federal Republic of Yugoslavia Slobodan Milošević.

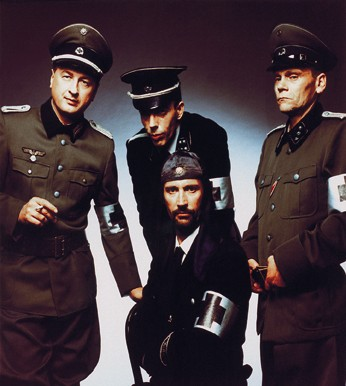
The 1983–2003 period key members of Laibach in 2003, clockwise: Dejan Knez, Ervin Markošek, Milan Fras and Ivan "Jani" Novak

In 2003, the group released the album WAT (an acronym for We Are Time), which, alongside new material, featured the song "Tanz mit Laibach" (German for "Dance with Laibach"), inspired by the song "Der Mussolini" by the German band D.A.F. Part of the album lyrics were written by Peter Mlakar, and part of the music was composed by the album producer Iztok Turk (former member of Videosex) and the DJs Umek, Bizzy and Dojaja. In 2003, one of the forming members of the group, Dejan Knez, left Laibach. In 2004, the group released the double compilation album Anthems, featuring a career-spanning selection of material, as well as the previously unreleased cover of Drafi Deutscher song "Mama Leone" and remixes of Laibach songs by Random Logic, Umek, Octex, Iztok Turk and others. The compilation also features a thorough group biography written by Alexei Monroe. In 2004, the band released two DVDs: the first, entitled Laibach, featured music videos and A Film about WAT, directed by Sašo Podgoršek, and the second, entitled 2, featured a recording from the Occupied Europe NATO Tour concert in Ljubljana held on 26 October 1995 and the documentary film A Film from Slovenia, directed by Daniel Landin and Peter Vezjak.

During 2006, the group released the album Volk (the title meaning Wolf in Slovene and People in German), featuring cover versions of national anthems, including the NSK "state anthem" "Das Lied der Deutschen", originally written in 1797 and used as German national anthem during the Weimar Republic. Each cover featured a guest vocalist singing the anthem in their own language, with the exception of the cover of the "State Anthem of the Russian Federation", which was entitled "Rossiya" and featured a choir composed mostly of the children of Russian and Ukrainian diplomats in Slovenia. During the same year, on 1 June, the group performed J. S. Bach's "The Art of Fugue" in Bach's hometown Leipzig, and their interpretation of the work was released on the album Laibachkunstderfuge in 2008. In 2007, the group released the DVD Live at the CC Club, featuring the recording of their London concert held on 16 April 2007. The 2008 DVD Volk Dead in Trbovlje featured the recording of the band's performance held in Trbovlje's Worker's Hall on 23 March 2007, as well as music videos for the songs from Volk and a documentary about the tour entitled Volk Tour Medley, all directed by Sašo Podgoršek.

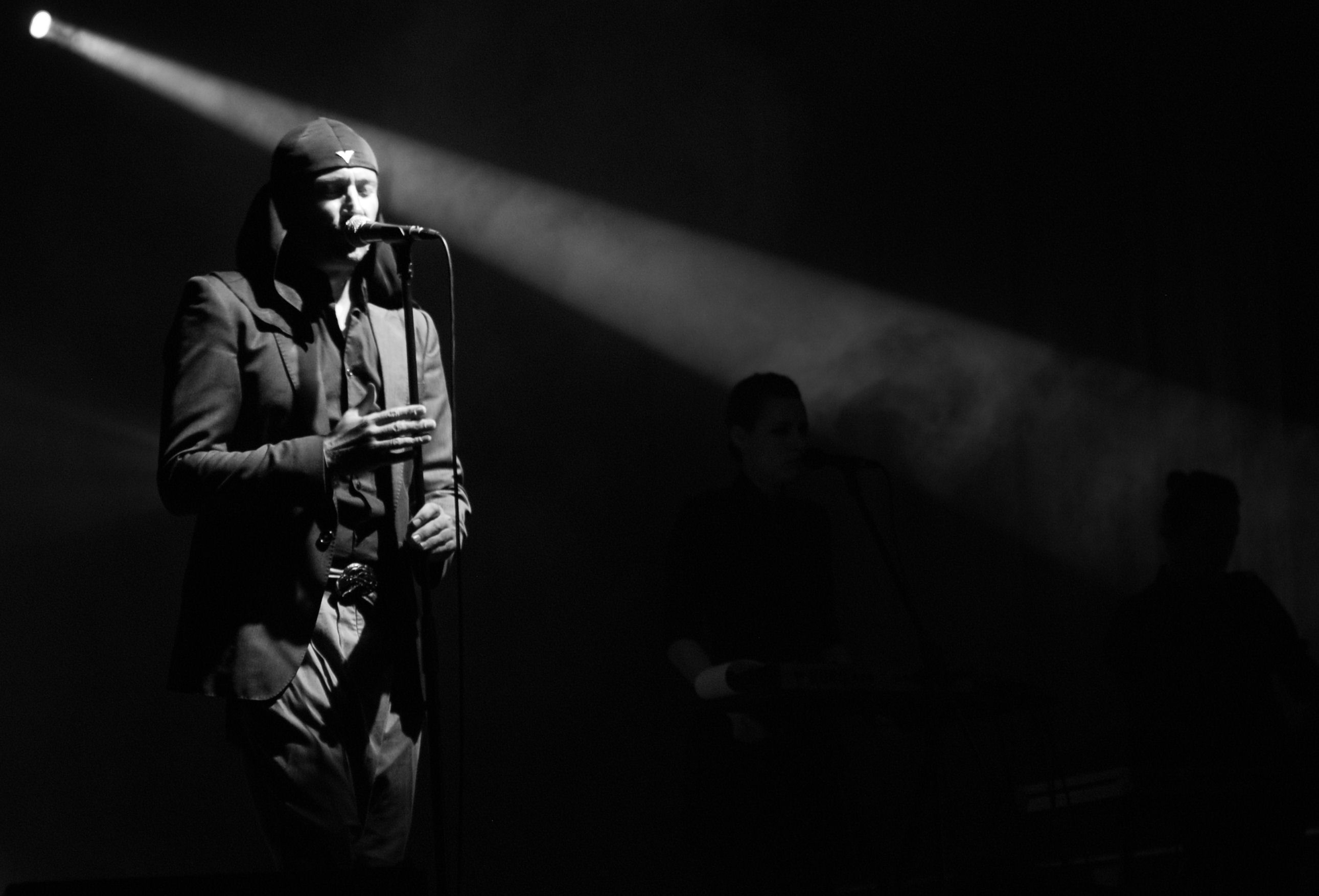
Milan Fras and Mina Špiler in concert in 2010

In 2011, the group released the box set Gesamtkunstwerk – Dokument 81–82 (Total Work of Art – Document 81–82), featuring five vinyl records and a DVD with unreleased studio recordings from the early phases of their career. The compilation was released in a limited number of 600 copies only. During the same year, the band recorded a cover of Bob Dylan's "Ballad of a Thin Man", recorded for the tribute album Projekt Bob Dylan: Postani prostovoljec! (Project Bob Dylan: Become a Volunteer!), commissioned by the American Embassy in Ljubljana in honor of Dylan's 70th birthday. The band was hired by director Timo Vuorensola to compose music for his science fiction comedy film Iron Sky, and it was released on the soundtrack album Iron Sky in 2012. The double album Iron Sky Director's Cut featured their music originally composed for Iron Sky, but eventually not used in the film. On 14 April 2012, in the Tate Modern Turbine Hall the band held a concert which was envisioned as the recreation of their 1983 concert at Zagreb Biennalle, with guest appearances by some of the group's early members. The recording of the concert was released on the double live album Monumental Retro-Avant-Garde.

In 2014, Laibach released the album Spectre, the title referring to the first line of The Communist Manifesto. The band dedicated the album songs "Eurovision", "The Whistleblowers" (musically based on "Colonel Bogey March"), "We Are Millions and Millions Are One" (featuring new member Mina Špiler on lead vocals) and "No History" to Julian Assange and Edward Snowden. The deluxe edition of the album featured four bonus tracks, including a cover of Blind Lemon Jefferson's "See That My Grave Is Kept Clean" and Serge Gainsbourg's "Love on the Beat", and a book entitled Spectre Playbook, a Laibach "manifesto" with a goal of uniting social activists from around the world. The album Spectremix, released in 2015, featured Spectre songs remixes by Marcel Dettmann, Gramatik, Iztok Turk and other artists. During 2014, the band was invited by National Cultural Centre of Poland to record music for the commemoration of the 70th anniversary of the outbreak of the Warsaw Uprising. The band released the material on the EP 1 VIII 1944 Warszawa, featuring a version of the classic song of the insurgency "Warszawskie Dzieci" ("Children of Warsaw"),

In August 2015, on the initiative of Norwegian director Morten Traavik, the band performed in Pyongyang, North Korea. The band held two concerts, on 19 and 20 August, at Kim Won Gyun Musical Conservatory in Nampo-dong, Pyongyang, to coincide with the 70th anniversary of the end of Japanese rule of Korea. The concerts saw large attention of the Western media, a part of which described Laibach's upcoming performance as the first performance of a Western rock band in North Korea, although this was later revealed to be a misinformation. The concerts were the subject of the documentary film Liberation Day by Morten Traavik and Uģis Olte, which premiered in 2016. In 2017, the band performed in South Korea, becoming the only musical band in the world to have performed in both countries.

In July 2017, Laibach released the album Also Sprach Zarathustra. The songs on the album were originally composed for a theatrical production of Thus Spoke Zarathustra, based on Friedrich Nietzsche's novel of the same name, directed by Matjaž Berger and premiering in the Anton Podbevšek Theatre in Novo Mesto. In 2018, the group released the album The Sound of Music, featuring their versions of the songs from the film of the same name. The band had previously performed these songs on their North Korea performances, choosing them because they are well-known in the country. The album included their version of the Korean folk song "Arirang", in which the band used traditional Korean instrument gayageum.

In 2020, the band released the box set Revisited, featuring a reissue of their debut album with bonus tracks, new versions of their songs from the first half of the 1980s, and two live recordings – one with the Radio-Television Slovenia Symphony Orchestra, and the other with the Lviv Philharmonic Orchestra. The box set included the release entitled Underground, with a recording of one of three performances the group held in 2017 in Velenje Mine, 200 meters under the ground. The 2021 live album We Forge the Future – Live at Reina Sofia featured the recording of the concert held at Madrid's Museo Nacional Centro de Arte Reina Sofía on 26 November 2017 and dedicated to their 1983 Zagreb Biennale performance. The release featured the book Terror of History, with texts by journalist Igor Vidmar, author Marcel Stefančić and former president of Slovenia Milan Kučan. In 2022, Laibach released the album Wir sind das Volk (ein Musical aus Deutschland) (We are the People (a Musical of Germany)) with the music from the theatre play We Are the People, based on the works of Heiner Müller, which premiered in Berlin's Hebbel am Ufer center on 8 February 2020. On their 5 and 6 September 2022 performances at the Ljubljana Summer Festival, the band presented their symphonic work Alamut, based on the 1938 novel Alamut by Vladimir Bartol. The symphony was created in cooperation with Iranian composers Nima A.Rowshan and Idin Samimi Mofakham. The band performed the symphony with the Radio-Television of Slovenia Symphony Orchestra, vocal group Gallina, Tehran choir Human Voice Ensemble and AccordiOna accordion orchestra. Following the premiere in Ljubljana, Alamut got its first European tour the following year.

Laibach was scheduled to perform in Kyiv on 31 March 2023. However, the band's description of the Russo-Ukrainian War as a proxy war angered many Ukrainians and the concert was canceled. In 2023, the band released the latest studio album Sketches from the Red District and the EP Love Is Still Alive, the latter featuring the songs written by the band for the 2019 Iron Sky sequel Iron Sky: The Coming Race. In 2024, the band released several singles: an atonal cover of Billie Holiday's "Strange Fruit", a cover of "White Christmas", recorded with Slovenian electronic duo Silence, and a Slovene language cover of Bijelo Dugme song "Top" ("Cannon"), entitled "S topom te bom ciljal moja mala" ("I Will Shoot You With a Cannon, Baby"). The latter was recorded in cooperation with Bijelo Dugme's leader Goran Bregović as a part of marking 50 years since Bijelo Dugme formation. The song featured Laibach's old collaborator Vasja Ulrih on lead vocals, with the accompanying music video, featuring excerpts from Laibach and Bijelo Dugme music videos and live recordings, compiled by Bregović and Laibach.

In January 2025, Laibach expressed their support for the Serbian students leading the Serbian anti-corruption protests with the message: "Students and Youth are always right", paraphrasing Josip Broz Tito's famous speech which led to cessation of 1968 student demonstrations in Yugoslavia. The band added that Serbian students are "saving the dignity of Serbia" and called citizens of Serbia to "make Serbia great again". On 23 October 2025, the group launched a new single, "Yom Kippur", named after the holiest day of the year in Judaism and featuring Palestinian Children's Choir.

== Musical style ==
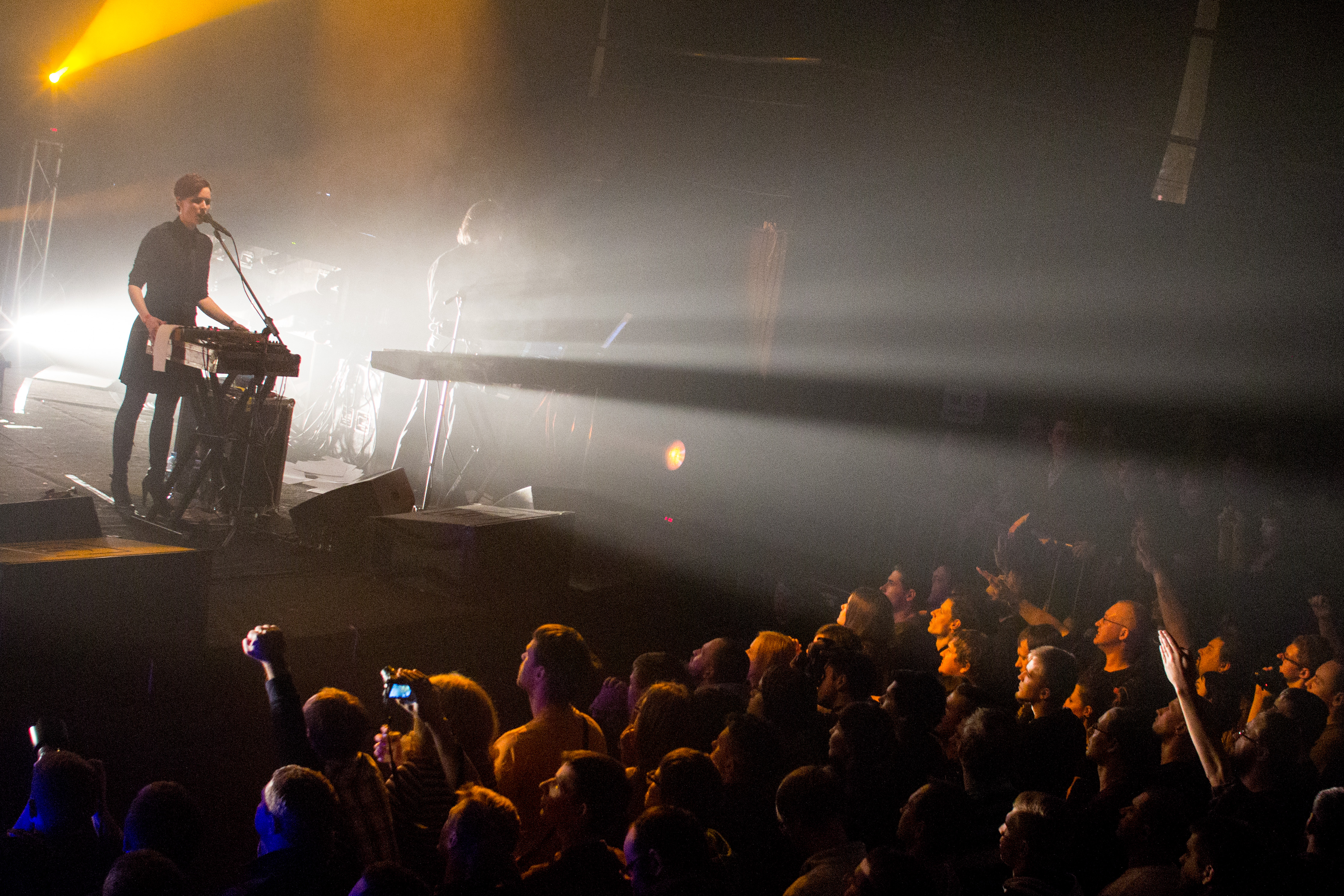
Laibach performing in Saint Petersburg, Russia in 2013

Early Laibach works were described as industrial rock by Yugoslav music press. The band's early releases were marked by heavy rhythms and roaring vocals. In the mid-1980s, with incorporating the covers of popular songs into their repertoire, the band's sound became more richly layered, featuring samples from pop and classical music.

Laibach's cover versions are often used to subvert the original message or intention of the song, a notable example being their version of the song "Live Is Life" by the Austrian pop rock band Opus. Laibach recorded two versions of the song, titled "Leben heißt Leben" and "Opus Dei". The first, the opening song on the Laibach album Opus Dei, was sung in German. The second was promoted as a single, and its promotional video (which used the title "Life Is Life") was played extensively on American cable channel MTV. "Opus Dei" retained some of the original song's English lyrics, but was delivered in a musical style that left the meaning of the lyrics open to interpretation. Whereas the original is a feel-good pop anthem, Laibach's interpretation twists the melody into a triumphant military march. With the exception of the promotional video, the refrain is at one point translated into German, giving an example of the sensitivity of lyrics to their context. The Opus Dei album also features a cover of Queen's "One Vision" with lyrics translated into German under the title '"Geburt einer Nation" ("Birth of a Nation"), revealing the ambiguity of lines like "One race one hope / One real decision".

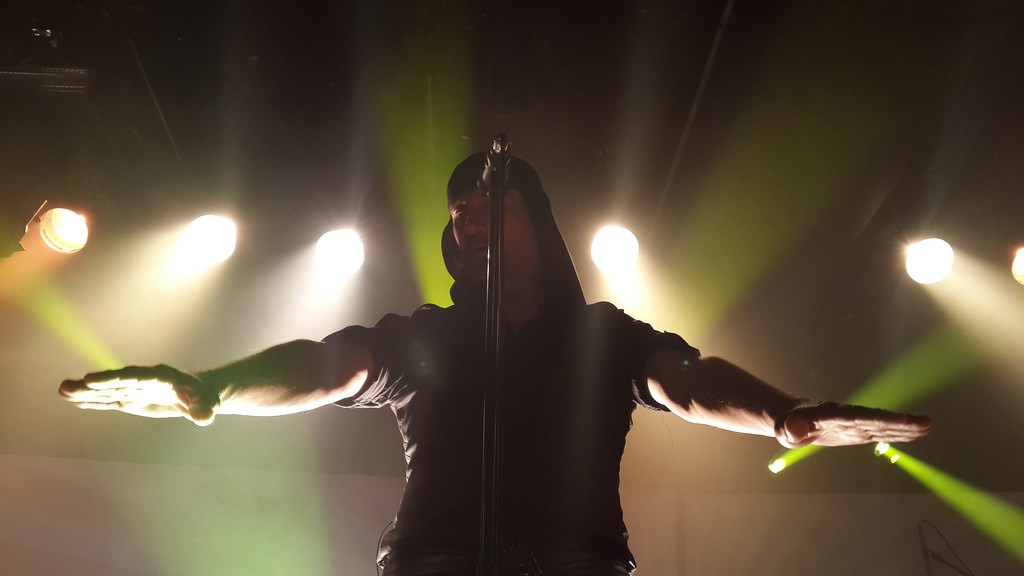
Milan Fras in concert in Budapest, Hungary in 2014

Laibach not only references modern artists through reinterpretation, but also samples or reinvents older musical pieces. For example, their song "Anglia", released on Volk, is based on the national anthem of the United Kingdom, "God Save the Queen". They have also toured with an audio-visual performance centered on Johann Sebastian Bach's Die Kunst der Fuge. Since this work has no specifications of acquired instruments and is furthermore based on mathematical principles, Laibach has argued that the music can be seen as proto-techno. Therefore, the band found Die Kunst der Fuge to be ideal for an interpretation using computers and software. In 2009, Laibach reworked Richard Wagner's Overture to Tannhäuser, Siegfried-Idyll and The Ride Of The Valkyries in collaboration with the RTV Slovenia Symphonic Orchestra, conducted by Izidor Leitinger. Laibach's version is titled "VolksWagner".

In addition to cover songs, Laibach has remixed songs by other bands. These include two songs by the Florida death metal band Morbid Angel that appear on the Morbid Angel EP Laibach Re-mixes.

== Aesthetics, image and controversy ==
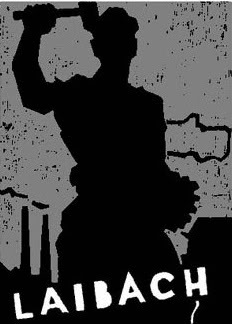
Laibach 1983 visual work The Thrower

At the early stage of their career, Laibach's visuals employed socialist realist mining iconography, and later the band incorporated, alongside influences from socialist realism, influences from Nazi art and Italian futurism to their imagery. On their early promotional posters the band used black crosses from the works of Russian avant-garde artist and art theorist Kazimir Malevich, later incorporating a black cross into their logo, consisting of a cross encircled with a gear. In the mid-1980s, when the usage of the name Laibach was banned in Yugoslavia, the group used posters with black crosses without band name to advertise their performances, and their debut album was released with the black cross and without any text on the cover. Cross imagery, and variations on the cross are apparent in many Laibach recordings and publications. Some Laibach releases feature artwork by the communist and early Dada artist John Heartfield. The usage of Heartfield's anti-Nazi work depicting swastika consisting of four bloodied axes on the inner sleeve of the album Opus Dei caused controversies in some European countries.

The visual imagery of Laibach's art has been described as "radically ambiguous". An early example of this ambiguity would be the woodcut entitled The Thrower, also known as Metalec (The Metal Worker). This work features a monochrome silhouette of a figure with a clenched fist holding a hammer aloft. The work could be seen both as promoting industrial protest or as a symbol of industrial pride. Another aspect of this woodcut is the large typefaced word LAIBACH, evoking memories of the Nazi occupation of Slovenia. This piece was featured prominently during the band's 1983 interview for TV tednik.

Laibach has frequently been accused of both far left and far right political stances due to their use of uniforms and totalitarian-style aesthetics. They were also accused of being neo-nationalists. When confronted with such accusations, Laibach is quoted as replying with the ambiguous response "We are fascists as much as Hitler was a painter". Laibach concerts have sometimes aesthetically appeared as political rallies, and the members of Laibach are notorious for rarely stepping out of character. When interviewed, they often answer in wry manifestos, showing a paradoxical lust for, and condemnation of, authority.

Finnish author and nationalist Tuomas Tähti disclosed in his 2019 book Nationalistin henkinen horisontti that Laibach member Ivan "Jani" Novak told him in March 2015 that the band is a communist group and most of their work is connected to communism.

British musician and journalist Richard Wolfson wrote of the group:

Laibach's method is extremely simple, effective and horribly open to misinterpretation. First of all, they absorb the mannerisms of the enemy, adopting all the seductive trappings and symbols of state power, and then they exaggerate everything to the edge of parody... Next they turn their focus to highly charged issues—the West's fear of immigrants from Eastern Europe, the power games of the EU, the analogies between Western democracy and totalitarianism.

Slovenian philosopher Slavoj Žižek stated about the group after their performance in North Korea:

Quite often libertarian leftists were embarrassed by Laibach. On the one hand, of course, they had to support Laibach. But they were very uneasy about how to take Laibach. Their primordial fear—which is for me the first sign that they didn't understand anything about Laibach—was to claim that Laibach is a great ironic spectacle of subtly mocking, making fun of authority and so on. But then, almost always in my experience—I experienced this with my leftist friends—they added a worry: "What if people will not get it properly, what if people would take Laibach too seriously and perceive, or rather mispercieve, what is their ironic spectacle as real celebration of totalitarianism?" No, I think things are much more complex. Laibach is not simply making fun of totalitarianism. Laibach is bringing out the authoritarian feature which is present in most societies, even in the most democratic societies. [...] I think that Laibach is deeply aware [...] of this deep ambiguity of even the most democratic power. And they are trying to bring this authoritarian streak out even with a certain open fascination. There is no distance there. They are not making fun of it. They are openly enjoying it. So that's the traumatic message of Laibach: staging the real of power. [...] Usual left liberal critics or public of Laibach, they are reading Laibach along the lines of this standard humanist gap, searching behind the strict, totalitarian mask of Laibach for warm, humane persons. They want to find behind the mask of Laibach—all this low bass industrial totalitarian music—this guarantee: "Don't be afraid, behind this mask they are just ordinary warm people like ourselves." No, the message of Laibach is just the opposite one. It's not: "Don't be afraid, beneath our totalitarian mask we are warm, normal, compassionate people like you". No, it's—even if we look at our everyday life in the West, like normal, compassionate people, all the disgusting spectacles that we are doing in the West, charity, helping others and so on—we are really what we play to be. We are monsters, there is no humanity behind it. So, you see, it's not about North Korea. You will not learn a lot from Laibach about North Korea. You will learn a lot about our own anxieties and hypocrisies.

== Legacy, influence and innovation ==
Despite emerging during the active Yugoslav rock scene, Laibach is widely considered to be the only Yugoslav band to achieve large popularity in Western Europe during the existence of SFR Yugoslavia. The band has influenced a number of acts, has been paid tribute by several projects and has been a subject of several books and documentary films.

=== Tributes ===
In 1999, a tribute album to Laibach entitled Schlecht und Ironisch – Laibach Tribut (Bad and Ironic – Laibach Tribute) was released. Canadian industrial doom metal band Zaraza released a Laibach tribute EP entitled Montrealska Akropola – A Tribute to Laibach (Montreal Acropolis – A Tribute to Laibach) in 2004.

=== Martial music ===
Some early material by Laibach and later neoclassical releases by the band, such as the album Macbeth, were influential on certain artists within the martial industrial music genre.

=== Rammstein ===
Laibach is often cited as an influence for the popular German Neue Deutsche Härte band Rammstein. The parallel is regularly made between the bands regarding their aesthetics and deep male vocals both groups share and with their respective backgrounds of originating from former socialist countries.

When asked about the topic in an interview, Rammstein guitarist Richard Kruspe claimed Rammstein to have a more emotional approach instead of the more "intellectual" style of Laibach. In the same interview the keyboard player of Rammstein Christian Lorenz drew a parallel between the deep voices of Till Lindemann and Milan Fras but considered this to be the only similarity between the two music groups. The documentary film Liberation Day ends with a notice stating that a member of a certain industrial metal band was supposed to be interviewed for the film about the influence Laibach had on their earlier work, but it had to be removed due to the prospect of arrest or a fine from the district court of Berlin towards the makers of the film. This, and the early promotional material for the film suggest that it was Paul Landers who was to appear in the film.

When members of Laibach were asked by an interviewer about Rammstein "stealing" from them, they responded: "Laibach does not believe in originality... Therefore, Rammstein could not 'steal' much from us. They simply let themselves get inspired by our work, which is absolutely a legitimate process. We are glad that they made it. In a way, they have proven once again that a good 'copy' can make more money on the market than the 'original'. Anyhow, today we share the territory: Rammstein seem to be a kind of Laibach for adolescents and Laibach are Rammstein for grown-ups." Laibach would later provide a remix for the Rammstein single "Ohne dich".

=== Rankings ===
Laibach album Sympathy for the Devil was proclaimed in 2006 the 7th on The Mail on Sunday list of Ten Greatest Tribute Albums of All Time. The album Opus Dei was included in 2008 in the book 1001 Albums You Must Hear Before You Die. The same album was polled in 2015 as the 86th on the list of 100 Greatest Yugoslav Albums published by the Croatian edition of Rolling Stone.

=== Books and documentaries ===
Laibach has been the subject of several books:

- NSK Monography (1992),
- Interrogation Machine: Laibach and NSK (2005) by Alexei Monroe,
- Celostna umetnina Laibach: fragmentarni pogled, (The Laibach Integral Artwork: A Fragmentary View, 2014) by Barbara Borčič,
- Laibach: 40 godina večnosti (Laibach: 40 Years of Eternity, 2021) by Teodor Lorenčič.

The band has also been the subject of several documentaries:

- Laibach: Victory Under the Sun (1988), directed by Goran Gajić,
- Bravo (1993), directed by Peter Vezjak and Daniel Landin,
- Laibach: A Film from Slovenia (1993), directed by Daniel Landin and Chris Bohn,
- Predictions of Fire (1996), directed by Michael Benson,
- Divided States of America – Laibach 2004 Tour (2006), directed by Sašo Podgoršek,
- Liberation Day (2016), directed by Ugis Olte and Morten Traavik,
- LP Film Laibach (2017), directed by Igor Zupe.

== Members ==
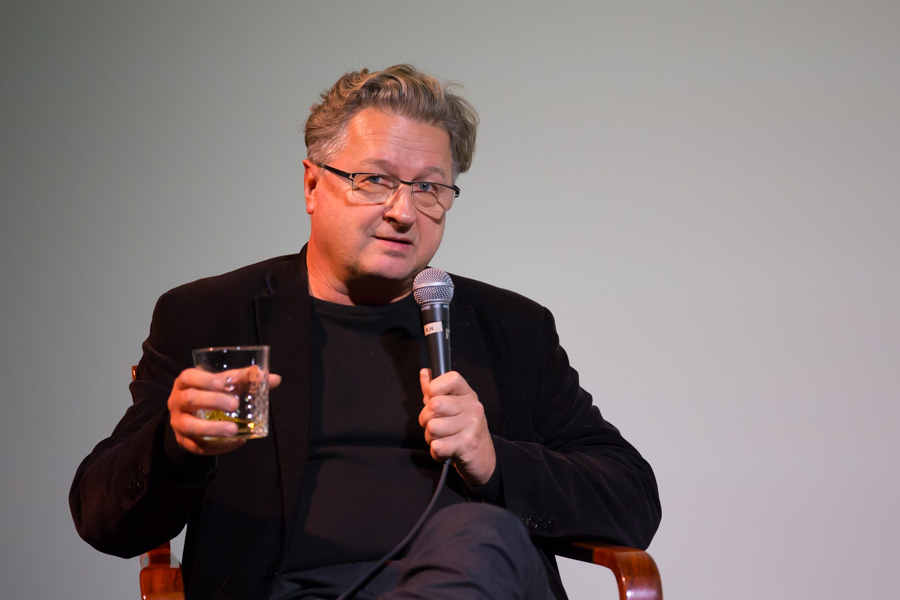
Ivan "Jani" Novak (pictured in 2017) has been a Laibach member since the beginning of the group's career and the leader of the band since the departure of the band's forming member Dejan Knez in 2003. Credited as "engineer of the human soul", Novak is the spokesperson for Laibach and does not appear on stage during live performances.

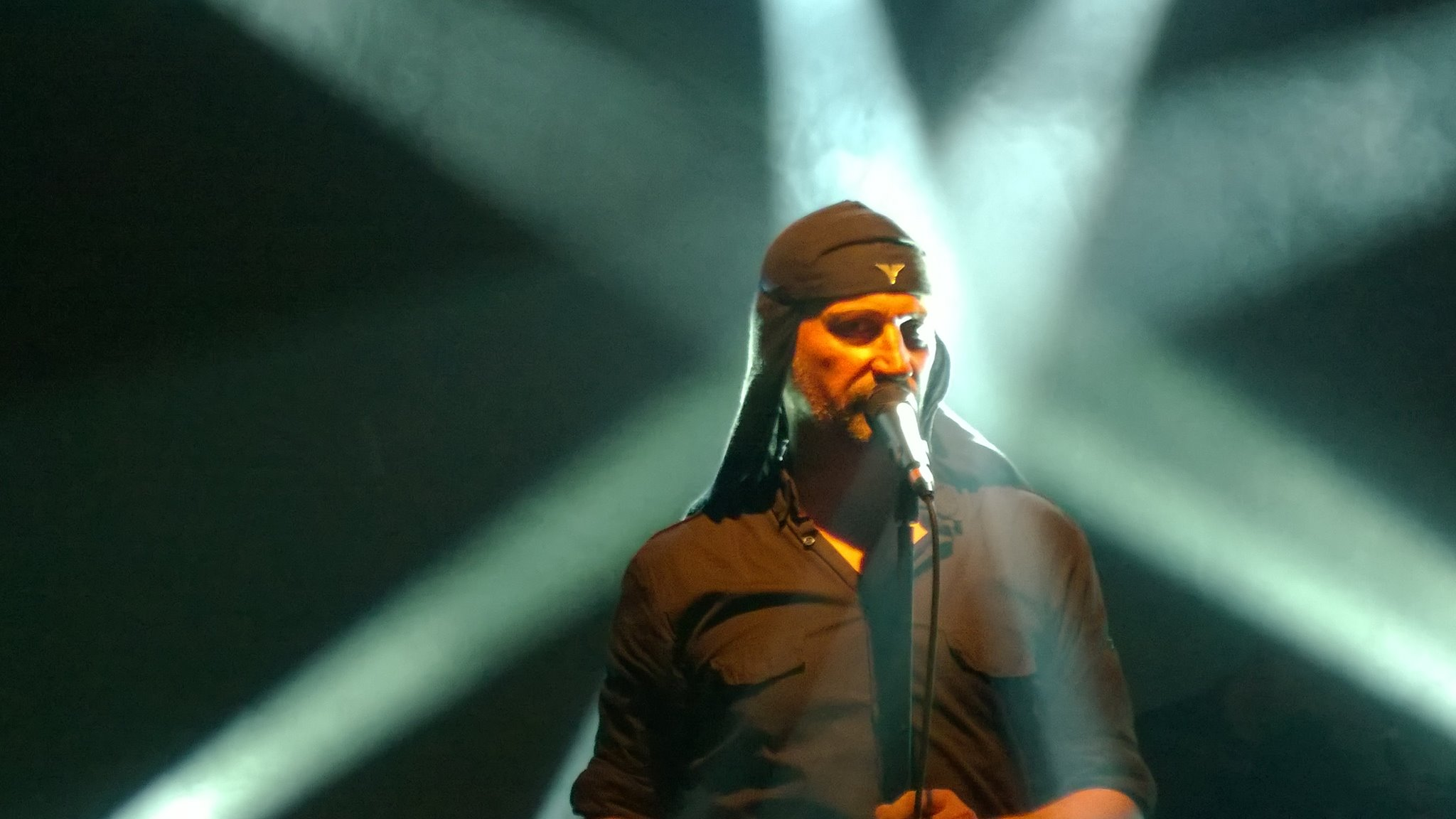
Milan Fras (pictured in 2014) has been Laibach lead vocalist since the death of the group's original frontman Tomaž Hostnik in 1982.

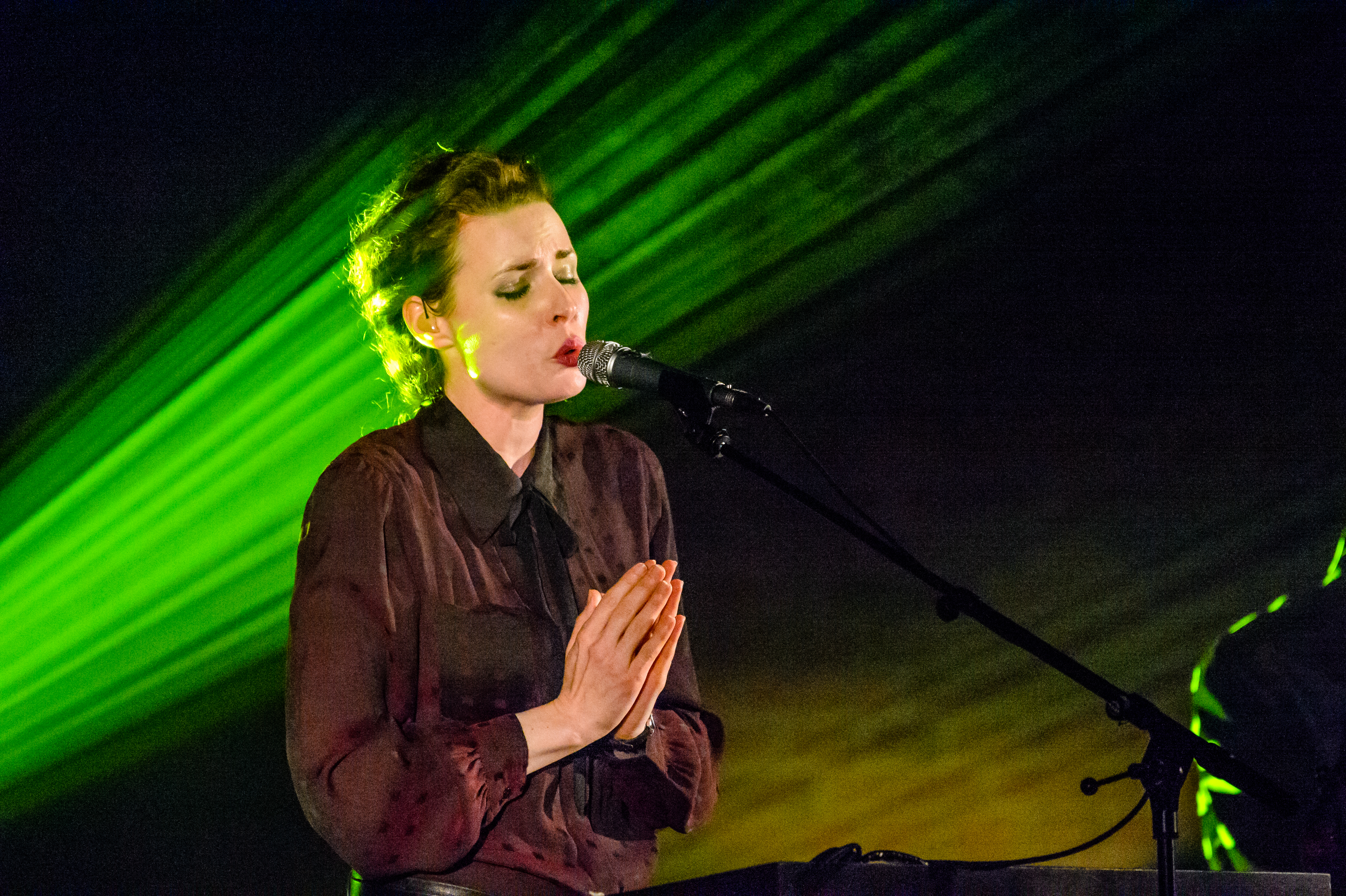
Mina Špiler (pictured in 2016) performed with Laibach as keyboardist and vocalist from 2006 to 2018.

Laibach evolved from the band Salto Mortale, formed in 1978 by Dejan Knez. The first incarnation of Laibach formed in 1980 included Dejan Knez, Tomaž Hostnik, Srečko Bajda, Andrej Lupinc, and Marko Košnik. Soon after that, Knez's relative Ivan "Jani" Novak and Milan Fras joined the band. First a quintet, Laibach quickly became a quartet and declared that the group had four members: "Vier Personen".

From mid-1980s to mid-1990s, while the core quartet included Dejan Knez, Milan Fras, Ervin Markošek and Ivan "Jani" Novak, the members frequently used the pseudonyms Dachauer, Keller, Saliger and Eber. The pseudonym Ivo Saliger was originally used by original singer Tomaž Hostnik and more recently by Ivan Novak. The pseudonym Elk Eber has been used by Dejan Knez. Former member Andrej Lupinc has continued to use the pseudonym Keller after leaving the band. Occasionally, other musicians supplemented the core group, some of whom included Oto Rimele (former guitarist for Lačni Franz), Nikola Sekulović (bass player for Demolition Group), and Anja Rupel (vocalist for Videosex and a solo artist).

On 20 June 2015, the band held a sound performance entitled Musical Nocturne with their most famous line-up of Knez, Novak, Fras and Markošek.

On 9 May 2025, Laibach held a concert in Cukrarna gallery in Ljubljana "We Forge the Future, Reconstruction of a historical concert", which was a reconstruction of their 1983 Zagreb Biennale concert. Dejan Knez, Ivan Novak, Iztok Turk, Srečko Bajda, Luka Jamnik and Vitja Balžalorsky appeared on stage.

=== Official members (pseudonyms) ===
- Eber (after Elk Eber)
- Saliger (after Ivo Saliger)
- Dachauer (after Wilhelm Dachauer)
- Keller

=== Current touring band ===
- Milan Fras – vocals
- Ivan "Jani" Novak – bandleader, spokesperson, press work, light, stage effects
- Marina Mårtensson – vocals, acoustic guitar (currently on maternity leave)
- Vitja Balžalorsky – guitar, sampling/remixing, background vocals
- Bojan Krhlanko – drums
- Luka Jamnik – electronics, synthesizers, vocals
- Rok Lopatič – keyboards, synthesizers, backing vocals (sometimes replaced by Sašo Vollmaier)

=== Former members and former/frequent collaborators ===
- Tomaž Hostnik – vocals, electronics (1980–1982)
- Dejan Knez – keyboards, drums, electronics (1980–2003)
- Srečko Bajda – electronics, voice, often humorously credited as Felix Casio
- Andrej Lupinc – electronics (1980–1982)
- Bine Zerko – electronics
- Ervin Markošek – drums, keyboards, electronics (left the band in 1989, returned for the studio album Kapital, and appears on press photos until WAT)
- Marko Košnik – electronics (1981–1983)
- Marjan Benčina – electronics, synthesizers (1982–1983)
- Mina Špiler – vocals, synthesizer
- Vasja Ulrih – voice (on some early tracks, some tracks on NATO and Kapital studio albums and on "S topom te bom ciljal, moja mala" single)
- David Jarh – trumpet and flugelhorn
- Daniel Landin – clarinet
- Lado Jakša – clarinet, saxophone and keyboards
- Janko Novak – operatic voice (on some tracks on the Let It Be studio album)
- Borut Kržišnik – guitar
- Oto Rimele – guitar
- Matej Mršnik – guitar
- Dare Hočevar – bass
- Nikola Sekulović – bass
- Tone Dimnik – drums
- Fritz Häaman – drums
- Dragoslav Radojković – drums (1982–1986)
- Roman Dečman – drums (1986–2006)
- Janez Gabrič – drums (2006–2018)
- Bojan Khrlanko – drums (2018–)
- Eva Breznikar – vocals, percussion (WAT and Volk tours)
- Nataša Regovec – vocals, percussion (WAT and Volk tours)
- Sašo Vollmaier – synthesizer, piano
- Boris Benko – vocals
- Marina Mårtensson – vocals, acoustic guitar
- Primož Hladnik
- Damjan Bizilj – synthesizer
- Iztok Turk – electronics, composer
- Anja Rupel – vocals
- Jože Pegam – various instruments
- Matjaž Pegam
- Peter Mlakar – speeches
- Sašo Podgoršek – videos
- Grant Austin – sound engineer
- Svetozar Mišić – documentation
- Anže Rozman – live orchestral arrangements
- Álvaro Domínguez Vázquez – live orchestral arrangements
- Slavko Avsenik Jr. – orchestral and choir arrangements (from Opus Dei to Spectre)

== Appearances in popular culture ==
- In 1989, on his second studio album Hoćemo gusle (We Want Gusle), Yugoslav alternative rock musician Rambo Amadeus recorded a Laibach parody song "Samit u burekdžinici Laibach" ("Summit in the Burek-Bakery Laibach"), featuring the song lyrics from the poems "Santa Maria della Salute" ("Saint Mary of Health") by Laza Kostić and "Strepnja" ("Trepidation") by Desanka Maksimović and the chorus from the turbo folk song "Čaše lomim, ruke mi krvave" ("I Break the Glasses, My Hands Are Bleeding"). A promotional video was also recorded for the track, parodying Laibach videos and aesthetics.
- Von Bach, a fictional supervillain modeled after Milan Fras, appears in the DC Comics graphic novel Kingdom Come, by Alex Ross and Mark Waid. Von Bach appears dressed in Laibach-style uniform and displays the group's cross tattooed on his chest. He is described as follows: "German-speaking superhuman and would-be dictator is the example of the Hitleresque villain that had so much symbolic importance in the Golden Age of comic books. The blocky cross on his chest is evocative of the kind of bold symbols used by fascists. Von Bach has the words 'Liebe' (love) and 'Hass' (hate) tattooed on his arms and, in fact, his entire body has been covered with one large tattoo of that dark color that most tattoos become, with his natural flesh color only coming through in the designs on his body". On the NSK State website, the band states they have "been paid with uncommon honour" by this.
- Laibach's version of the Juno Reactor song "God Is God" (which was itself inspired by Laibach's cover of Opus's song "Live Is Life") from the album Jesus Christ Superstars appears on the second soundtrack disc for the computer game Command & Conquer: Red Alert, which was released only in the German release of the Special Edition pack, and on the album The Blair Witch Project: Josh's Blair Witch Mix.

== Discography ==
=== Studio albums ===
- Laibach (1985)
- Nova Akropola (1986)
- Opus Dei (1987)
- Krst pod Triglavom – Baptism (1987)
- Let It Be (1988)
- Macbeth (1989)
- Sympathy for the Devil (1990)
- Kapital (1992)
- NATO (1994)
- Jesus Christ Superstars (1996)
- WAT (2003)
- Volk (2006)
- Laibachkunstderfuge (2008)
- Iron Sky – The Original Soundtrack (2012)
- Iron Sky Director's Cut (2013)
- Spectre (2014)
- Also Sprach Zarathustra (2017)
- The Sound of Music (2018)
- Wir sind das Volk (Ein Musical aus Deutschland) (2022)
- Sketches of the Red Districts (2023)
- Opus Dei Revisited (2024)
- Alamut (2025)
- Musick (2026)

=== EPs ===
- Party Songs (2019)
- Love Is Still Alive (2023)

=== Live albums ===
- Documents of Oppression (Live from N.L. Centrum, Amsterdam) (1984)
- Vstajenje v Berlinu (1984)
- V2 Live Nr.3 (1985)
- Neu Konservatiw (1985)
- Ein Schauspieler (1985)
- The Occupied Europe Tour 1985 (1986)
- Divergences / Divisions (Live in Bordeaux) (1986)
- Ljubljana-Zagreb-Beograd (1993)
- Occupied Europe NATO Tour 1994-95 (1996)
- M.B. December 21, 1984 (1997)
- The John Peel Sessions (2002)
- Volk Tour London CC Club (2007)
- Monumental Retro-Avant-Garde (2012)
- Bremenmarsch (Live At Schlachthof 12. 10. 1987) (2020)
- We Forge the Future – Live at Reina Sofia (2021)

=== Compilation albums ===
- Laibach / Last Few Days (With Last Few Days, 1983)
- Rekapitulacija 1980–1984 (1985)
- Slovenska Akropola (1987)
- Anthems (2004)
- An Introduction to... Laibach (2012)

=== Box sets ===
- Gesamtkunstwerk – Dokument 81–86 (2011)
- Revisited (2020)

=== Video albums ===
- Laibach (2004)
- 2 (2004)
- Divided States of America (2006)
- Volk Dead in Trbovlje (2008)

=== Singles ===
==== 7-inch singles ====
- "Life Is Life" / "Germania" (1987)
- "Across the Universe" / "Maggie Mae" (Mute, 1988, London)

==== 12-inch singles ====
- "Boji" / "Sila" / "Brat Moj" (1984)
- "Panorama" / "Decree" (1984)
- "Die Liebe" / "Grösste Kraft" (1985)
- "Geburt einer Nation" / "Leben heisst Leben (ins.)" (1987)
- "Life Is Life" / "Germania" / "Life" (1987)
- "Sympathy for the Devil 1" / "Laibach, 300.000 V.K." (1988)
- "Sympathy for the Devil 2" / "Germania, 300.000 V.K." (1988) - UK No. 137
- "Sympathy for the Devil" / "Sympathy for the Devil" (picture disc, 1988)
- "Across the Universe" / "Maggie Mae" / "Get Back" (1988) - UK No. 160
- "3. Oktober" / "Geburt einer Nation (live)" (1990)
- "Wirtschaft ist tot" / "Wirtschaft ist tot" (1992)
- "Wirtschaft ist tot" / "Sympathy for the Devil" (promotional remixes single, 1992)
- "Final Countdown" / "Final Countdown" (1994)
- "In the Army Now" / "War" (1995)
- "God Is God" (1996)
- "Tanz mit Laibach" (2004)
- "Das Spiel ist aus" (2004)
- "Anglia" (2006)

==== CD singles ====
- "Sympathy for the Devil" / "Sympathy for the Devil" / "Sympathy for the Devil" (picture CD, 1988)
- "Across the Universe" / "Maggie Mae" / "Get Back" (1988)
- "Panorama" / "Die Liebe" / "Decree" / "Grösste Kraft" (1989, London)
- "3. Oktober" / "Geburt einer Nation (live)" (1990)
- "Wirtschaft ist tot" / "Wirtschaft ist tot" (1992)
- "Final Countdown" / "Final Countdown" (1994)
- "In the Army Now" / "War" (1995)
- "Jesus Christ Superstar" / "God Is God" (1996)
- "Tanz mit Laibach" (2004)
- "Das Spiel ist aus" (2004)
- "Anglia" (2006)
- "1 VIII 1944" (2014)

== Side projects ==
- 300.000 V.K., Dejan Knez electronic music side project
- Germania, side project by Laibach, Iztok Turk, and Anja Rupel
- 600.000 V.K., responsible for the music for the Noordung theatre productions
- Kraftbach
