= Liberation Day (disambiguation) =

Liberation Day is a day marking the liberation of a place.

Liberation Day may also refer to:

== Film ==
- Liberation Day (film), a 2016 music documentary film

== Literature ==
- Liberation Day (novel), a 2002 novel in the Nick Stone Missions series
- Liberation Day: Stories, a 2022 short story collection by George Saunders

== Television ==
- "Liberation Day", 24 Hours in A&E; series 15, episode 4 (2018)
- "Liberation Day", Stormworld; episode 23 (2009)
- "Liberation Day", V: The Series; episode 1 (1984)

== Video games ==
- Liberation Day (video game), a 1998 video game

== Other uses ==
- Christopher Street Liberation Day, celebrating Gay liberation in New York City held annual since June 28 1970 as the foundation of LGBTQ Pride marches around the world

== See also ==
- Liberation Day tariffs, a set of import duties announced for the United States on April 2, 2025
