= Party Songs =

EP by Laibach
- Released: 22 November 2019
- Genre: Avant-garde
- Label: Mute Records

Laibach chronology
The Sound of Music (2018)	Party Songs (2019)

Party Songs is an EP by Neue Slowenische Kunst industrial/avant-garde group Laibach. It contains three versions of the song "Honourable, Dead or Alive, When Following the Revolutionary Road", as well as two versions of North Korean pop song "We Will Go To Mount Paektu" and a live recording of all-Korean folk song "Arirang" . The songs are a collaboration with Boris Benko from Slovenian electronic band Silence.

The song "Honourable, Dead or Alive, When Following the Revolutionary Road" is a re-interpretation of an aria from the Korean revolutionary opera Tell O' The Forest!, one of five famous revolutionary operas in North Korea, "written and produced under the guidance of the Dear Leader Kim Jong-il." It was "prepared for the 2015 Liberation Day concert in Ponghwa Theatre in Pyongyang, but deemed too 'confusing' by the North Korean hosts and struck from the concert repertoire."

== Track listing ==
1. Honourable, Dead or Alive, When Following the Revolutionary Road (Arduous March Version) – 4:06
2. Honourable, Dead or Alive, When Following the Revolutionary Road (Single Hearted Unity Version) – 3:19
3. We Will Go To Mount Paektu – 3:38
4. Arirang (Live at Kum Song Music School, Pyongyang) – 2:26
5. Honourable, Dead or Alive, When Following the Revolutionary Road (Live at Kum Song Music School, Pyongyang) – 2:24
6. We Will Go To Mount Paektu (Live at Ponghwa Theatre, Pyongyang) - 3:33
