= The Sound of Music (Laibach album) =

Studio album by Laibach
- Released: 23 November 2018
- Genre: Electronic
- Label: Mute Records

Laibach chronology
Also Sprach Zarathustra (2017)	The Sound of Music (2018)	Party Songs (2019)

The Sound of Music is an album by NSK industrial group Laibach. The album is a reinterpretation of the soundtrack of the musical of the same name. Also included are Korean folks songs such as Arirang. Lead vocals are usually duets between lead singer Milan Fras and guest collaborator Boris Benko of Silence.

== Music videos ==
Laibach has released many music videos of the songs featured on this album on their official YouTube channel.

The accompanying video of the title track "The Sound of Music" released on 5 September 2018, depicts impressions of the culture of North Korea, with in the opening shot an animation with a chamois buck on the top of a skyscraper, referring to the legendary Zlatorog in Slovene folklore.

The video for The Lonely Goatherd was released on 19 November 2018. It features Milan Fras dressed as a Christian priest guiding a flock of young girls dressed as sheep. Boris Benko appears as the goatherd.

The video for So Long, Farewell was released on 14 March 2019. It depicts a Goebbels type family eating dinner in a bunker next to the Swastika Christmas tree from John Heartfield's O Tannenbaum im deutschen Raum, wie krumm sind deine äste!. The father (played by Ivan Novak) finishes eating and then leads them one by one through the basement door. According to Laibach the symbolism of this video is that the Von Trapp family never left Nazi controlled Austria but simply went "underground" much like how North Koreans are trapped in their totalitarian country. In their own words, the Sound of Music ends in "captivity and death." This music video also includes a reference to Josef Fritzl with the father leading his children to the basement. Milan Fras makes a physical appearance at the end of the video as a nun.

== Background ==
In 2015, the band Laibach performed in North Korea making it the first Western rock band to ever perform in the Democratic People’s Republic of Korea despite the group's reputation for artistically criticizing totalitarian regimes. They were helped by Norwegian director Morten Traavik and Parisian graphic designer Valnoir. The Sound of Music is a very popular film in the country as it is one of the few American films allowed to be viewed by the public for English language practice. It was performed to celebrate the 70th anniversary of independence. They received media coverage from around the world for this - from John Oliver to the Rolling Stone magazine. At this concert in Pyongyang, Laibach presented arrangements of songs from the musical The Sound of Music, which were later recorded in the studio.

== Critical reception ==
Professional ratings
Aggregate scores
Source	Rating
Metacritic	73/100
Review scores
Source	Rating
AllMusic	3.5/5 stars
Drowned in Sound	8/10
MusicOMH	3/5 stars
PopMatters	8/10

The album was well received by critics. Ben Beaumont-Thomas in The Guardian rated it 4/5 stars, calling it "stirring, funny and thought provoking".

== Track listing ==
No.	Title	Length
1.	"The Sound of Music"	4:55
2.	"Climb Ev'ry Mountain"	4:03
3.	"Do-Re-Mi"	4:26
4.	"Edelweiss"	3:15
5.	"My Favorite Things"	3:42
6.	"The Lonely Goatherd"	3:32
7.	"Sixteen Going On Seventeen"	4:04
8.	"So Long, Farewell"	3:18
9.	"Maria/Korea"	4:19
10.	"Arirang"	2:59
11.	"The Sound of Gayageum"	2:04
12.	"Welcome Speech"	1:31

- Songs 1-9 were written by Richard Rodgers and Oscar Hammerstein II.
- Songs 10 and 11 are Korean folk songs.
- Song 12 is a critical speech deriding the group's use of sexually explicit content and Nazi style imagery in their music videos. It was given by Ryu, Chairman of the Cultural Exchange Committee with foreign countries upon Laibach's offer to perform in the Democratic People's Republic of Korea.
