= Nova Akropola =

Studio album by Laibach
- Released: 8 February 1986
- Recorded: 1985
- Genre: Industrial, martial industrial
- Label: Cherry Red (UK), Wax Trax! (US), Rebel Rec. (Europe)
- Producer: Jurij, Toni, Ken Thomas, Rico Conning, Laibach, D-Moniker

Laibach chronology
Rekapitulacija 1980–1984 (1985)	Nova Akropola (1986)	Opus Dei (1987)

Professional ratings
Review scores
Source	Rating
AllMusic	3/5 stars

Nova akropola (New Acropolis in Slovene) is the second studio album by the Slovenian and Yugoslav avant-garde music group Laibach. It was released in 1986.

== Track listing ==
Original album:

1. "Vier Personen" (Four Persons) (Jani Novak) – 5:26
2. "Nova akropola" (New Acropolis) (Jani Novak/Milan Fras/Dejan Knez) – 6:55
3. "Krvava gruda - Plodna zemlja" (Bloody Ground - Fertile Land) (Jani Novak/Milan Fras/Dejan Knez) – 4:07
4. "Vojna poema" (War Poem) (Jani Novak) – 3:12
5. "Ti, ki izzivaš" (Outro) (You, who are challenging) (Bernard Herrmann) – 1:20
6. "Die Liebe" (Love) (Milan Fras) – 4:26
7. "Država" (State) (Jani Novak) – 4:19
8. "Vade Retro" (Go Back) (Dejan Knez) – 4:33
9. "Panorama" (Jani Novak/Milan Fras/Dejan Knez, melody inspired by Gustav Holst Mars, the first movement of the Planets suite) – 4:52
10. "Decree" (Jani Novak/Milan Fras/Dejan Knez) – 6:41

2023 Expanded Edition bonus disc/tracks:

1. "Vade Retro Satanas" (Performed live with the Slovenian Philharmonic Orchestra, Cankarjev dom, European Month of Culture event, Ljubljana, 1997)
2. "Nova akropola ƎЯ" (Live at MSU-Museum of Contemporary Art, Zagreb, 2019)
3. "Vier Personen ƎЯ" (Live at Kino Šiška, Ljubljana, 2019)
4. "Krvava gruda - Plodna zemlja ƎЯ" (Live at EXIT Fest, Novi Sad, 2021)
5. "Ti, ki izzivaš ƎЯ" (Live at EXIT Fest, Novi Sad, 2021)
6. "Die Liebe ƎЯ" (Live in MKC-Cultural Center, Skopje, 2018)
7. "Država ƎЯ" (Live in Ljubljana Castle, Ljubljana, 2020)

== Credits ==
Music published by Complete Music Ltd.
Recorded and mixed at Metropolis Studio, Oasis Studio and Guerilla Studio 1985.
Produced by Jurij, Toni, Ken Thomas, Rico Conning and Laibach except "Decree" and "Panorama" produced by Laibach and D-Moniker (Duncan Macdonald).

== Release details ==
Cherry Red Records released the original LP in the UK, and it has been re-issued on various formats by Rebel Rec. (Germany, Austria and Switzerland), VAP (Japan), Wax Trax! and Cleopatra Records (U.S.), and Optic Nerve (UK). Cherry Red re-issued it in 2002 as an enhanced CD (with "Država" on video), and again in 2023 on Record Store Day as an Expanded Edition 2-LP set (one on black vinyl, one on silver), with a remaster of the original album, a second LP consisting of live performances of songs from the album, spanning 25 years, and redone artwork. Another LP pressing and a CD of this edition will be released later in the year.
