= Macbeth (album) =

1990 music album by Laibach

Soundtrack album by Laibach
- Released: 22 January 1990
- Genre: Industrial, classical
- Length: 32:00
- Label: Mute

Laibach chronology
Let It Be (1988)	Macbeth (1990)	Sympathy for the Devil (1990)

Professional ratings
Review scores
Source	Rating
Allmusic	2.5/5 stars
Novi ritam	5/5 stars

Macbeth is a 1990 album by Slovenian avant-garde music group Laibach. It consists of music composed and performed by Laibach for a 1987 production of the William Shakespeare play Macbeth by Wilfried Minks at Deutsches Schauspielhaus in Hamburg, Germany in 1987. It is the second Laibach album consisting of music written for a play, after their 1986 album Baptism.

Largely instrumental, the music is a combination of dramatic pseudo-classical themes, typically on strings and brass, and militaristic ones dominated by percussion, with musique concrete interludes. Critics have noted the album's resemblance to Laibach's earlier, more radical and experimental style, in contrast with their, at the time, increasing incorporation of popular music elements.

== Track listing ==
[NJC 11] (Side A)
No.	Title	Length
1.	"Preludium"
2.	"Agnus Dei (Acropolis)"
3.	"Wutach Schlucht"
4.	"Die Zeit"
5.	"Ohne Geld"
6.	"U.S.A."

[NJ-Oö] (Side B)
No.	Title	Length
7.	"10.5.1941"
8.	"Expectans Expectavos"
9.	"Coincidentia Oppositorum"
10.	"Wolfis"
11.	"Agnus Dei (Exil und Tod)"
Total length:		32:00

The LP editions don't list the individual track durations. The CD editions contain all music merged into a single half-hour track.
