= Sympathy for the Devil (album) =

Studio album by Laibach
- Released: 19 March 1990
- Genre: Industrial, neoclassical dark wave
- Length: 49:42
- Label: Mute

Laibach chronology
| Macbeth (1990) | Sympathy for the Devil (1990) | Kapital (1992) |

Professional ratings
Review scores
| Source | Rating |
|---|---|
| Allmusic | 3/5 stars |

Sympathy for the Devil is a compilation album by Laibach that follows their Beatles cover album Let It Be. Sympathy for the Devil features seven cover versions of the Rolling Stones song "Sympathy for the Devil" and one original Laibach track. The tracks are recorded by Laibach and by side projects featuring Laibach members: Dreihunderttausend Verschiedene Krawalle (300.000 V.K.) and Germania.

== Track listing ==
The following tracks constitute the final 1990 release, which compiles every version of the song that was previously released on two 12" singles and two CD singles in the UK in 1988. Track 1 is an edited version of Track 7.

1. Laibach: "Sympathy for the Devil (Time for a Change)" – 5:43
2. Laibach: "Sympathy for the Devil (Dem Teufel zugeneigt)" – 4:54
3. 300.000 V.K.: "Sympathy for the Devil (Anastasia)" or "Anastasia" – 5:32
4. Germania: "Sympathy for the Devil (Who Killed the Kennedys – Instrumental)" – 5:53
5. Germania: "Sympathy for the Devil (Who Killed the Kennedys)" – 7:04
6. 300.000 V.K.: "Sympathy for the Devil (Soul to Waste)" – 4:52
7. Laibach: "Sympathy for the Devil" – 7:52
8. 300.000 V.K.: "Sympathy for the Devil (Soul to Waste – Instrumental)" – 7:52

All tracks written by Jagger/Richards except Track 3, written by Laibach.

The Germania version (Track 5) includes samples from the 1968 Jean-Luc Godard film Sympathy for the Devil, a radio interview with Sonny Barger of the Hells Angels following the Altamont festival and various Mick Jagger soundbites.

== Legacy ==
In 2015, the Sympathy for the Devil album cover was ranked 37th on the 100 Greatest Album Covers of Yugoslav Rock list, published by web magazine Balkanrock.
