= NATO (album) =

Studio album by Laibach
- Released: 10 October 1994
- Genre: EBM, industrial
- Length: 41:09
- Label: Mute

Laibach chronology
Ljubljana-Zagreb-Beograd (1993)	NATO (1994)	Occupied Nato Tour (1996)

Professional ratings
Review scores
Source	Rating
AllMusic	(3/5)

NATO, released on 10 October 1994, is a studio album by Slovenian industrial group Laibach, named after the North Atlantic Treaty Organization. It is a selection of cover versions with the theme of war.

== Track listing ==
1. "Nato" – 5:45 (original Mars - the Bringer of War by Gustav Holst)
2. "War" – 4:10 (original by The Temptations)
3. "Final Countdown" – 5:40 (original by Europe)
4. "In the Army Now" – 4:31 (original by Bolland)
5. "Dogs of War" – 4:43 (original by Pink Floyd)
6. "Alle gegen alle" – 3:52 (original by Deutsch Amerikanische Freundschaft)
7. "National Reservation" – 3:46 (original "Indian Reservation" by Paul Revere & the Raiders)
8. "2525" – 3:48 (original by Zager and Evans)
9. "Mars on River Drina" – 4:48 (original March on River Drina by Stanislav Binički)
