= John Heartfield =

German visual artist (1891–1968)

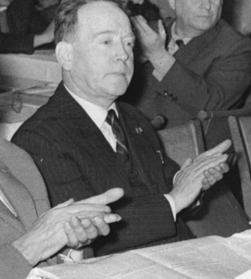
- John Heartfield in 1959
- Born: Helmut Herzfeld; 19 June 1891; Berlin-Schmargendorf, Berlin, German Empire
- Died: 26 April 1968 (aged 76); East Berlin, East Germany
- Education: Royal Bavarian Arts and Crafts School
- Known for: Photomontage
- Family: Wieland Herzfelde

John Heartfield (born Helmut Herzfeld; 19 June 1891 – 26 April 1968) was a German visual artist who pioneered the use of art as a political weapon. Some of his most famous photomontages were anti-Nazi and anti-fascist statements. Heartfield also created book jackets for book authors, such as Upton Sinclair, as well as stage sets for contemporary playwrights, such as Bertolt Brecht and Erwin Piscator. In 1916 Heartfield, his brother Wieland Herzfelde and George Grosz founded the Malik-Verlag through which they published most of their work.

== Biography ==
=== Early life, education and work ===
John Heartfield was born Hellmuth Franz Joseph Stolzenberg on 19 June 1891 in Berlin-Schmargendorf, Berlin under the German Empire. His name was legally changed upon the marriage of his parents in 1896. The parents were Franz Herzfeld, a socialist writer of Jewish background, and Alice (née Stolzenberg), a textile worker and political activist.

Franz Herzfeld was accused of blasphemy in 1895. The family had to flee to Switzerland, and later they were deported to Austria. Their parents disappeared in unclear circumstances in 1899, and died in mental hopitals a decade later, he in 1908, she in 1911. Heartfield and his siblings Wieland, Lotte and Hertha were left abandoned in a mountain hut. The four children went to live with Ignaz Varnschein, Mayor of Aigen, Salzburg, and his wife Clara, his uncle Joseph Herzfeld being the legal guardian.

He apprenticed as a bookseller in Wiesbaden in 1905, then studied art in Munich 1908-1911 at the Königliche Kunstgewerbeschule München (Royal Bavarian Arts and Crafts School) before transferring in 1912 to the Charlottenburg School of Arts and Crafts. Two commercial designers, Albert Weisgerber and Ludwig Hohlwein, were early influences.

While living in Berlin, he was drafted in 1914, but got discharged by feigning a nervous disorder. He began styling himself "John Heartfield", an anglicisation of his German name, to protest against anti-British fervour sweeping Germany during the First World War, when Berlin crowds often shouted "Gott strafe England!" ("May God punish England!") in the streets.

In 1916, he and George Grosz experimented with pasting pictures together, a form of art later named photomontage, and which would become a central characteristic of their work.

In 1917, Heartfield became a member of Berlin Club Dada. During the same year, Heartfield, his brother Wieland and George Grosz launched the Malik publishing house in Berlin. Heartfield would later become active in the Dada movement, helping to organise the Erste Internationale Dada-Messe (First International Dada Fair) in Berlin in 1920. Dadaists were provocateurs who disrupted public art gatherings and ridiculed the participants. They labeled traditional art trivial and bourgeois.

In January 1918, Heartfield joined the newly founded German Communist Party (KPD).

=== Interwar period ===
In 1919, Heartfield was dismissed from the Reichswehr film service because of his support for the strike that followed the assassination of Karl Liebknecht and Rosa Luxemburg. With George Grosz, he founded Die Pleite, a satirical magazine.

Heartfield met Bertolt Brecht in 1924, and became a member of a circle of German artists that included Brecht, Erwin Piscator, Hannah Höch, and a host of others.

Though he was a prolific producer of stage sets and book jackets, Heartfield's main form of expression was photomontage. Heartfield produced the first political photomontages. He mainly worked for two publications: the daily Die Rote Fahne ("The Red Flag") and the weekly communist magazine Arbeiter-Illustrierte-Zeitung (AIZ; "Workers' Illustrated Newspaper"), the latter of which published the works for which Heartfield is best remembered. He also built theatre sets for Erwin Piscator and Bertolt Brecht.

During the 1920s, Heartfield produced a great number of photomontages, many of which were reproduced as dust jackets for books such as his montage for Upton Sinclair's The Millennium.

It was through rotogravure, an engraving process whereby pictures, designs, and words are engraved into the printing plate or printing cylinder, that Heartfield's montages, in the form of posters, were distributed in the streets of Berlin between 1932 and 1933, when the Nazis came to power.

His political montages regularly appeared on the cover of Arbeiter-Illustrierte-Zeitung from 1930 to 1938, a popular weekly whose circulation (as many as 500,000 copies at its height) rivaled any other contemporary German magazine. Since Heartfield's photomontages appeared on this cover, his work was widely seen at newsstands.

Heartfield lived in Berlin until April 1933 when the Nazi Party took power. On Good Friday, the SS broke into his apartment, but he escaped by jumping from his balcony and hiding in a trash bin. He fled Germany by walking over the Sudeten Mountains to Czechoslovakia. He eventually rose to number five on the Gestapo's most-wanted list.

In 1934, he combined four bloody axes tied together to form a swastika to mock the "Blood and Iron" motto of the Reich (AIZ, Prague, 8 March 1934).

In 1938, given the imminent German occupation of Czechoslovakia, he was forced once again to flee from the Nazis. Relocating to England, he was interned as an enemy alien, and his health began to deteriorate. Afterward, he lived in Hampstead, London. His brother Wieland was refused a British residency permit in 1939 and instead left for the United States with his family.

=== Postwar period ===
In the aftermath of World War II, Heartfield was denied his written applications to remain in England for "his work and his health", and was convinced in 1950 to join Wieland, who had been living in East Berlin, East Germany. Heartfield moved into an apartment next to his brother's, at 129A Friedrichstrasse. However, his return to Berlin was seen with suspicion by the East German government due to his 11-year stay in England and the fact his dentist was under suspicion by the Stasi. He was interrogated (Note: The English translation of the interrogation appears in the David King book: John Heartfield, Laughter Is A Devastating Weapon.) and released having narrowly avoided a trial for treason, but was denied admission into the East German Akademie der Künste (Academy of the Arts). He was forbidden to work as an artist and was denied health benefits.

Due to the intervention of Bertolt Brecht and Stefan Heym, Heartfield was formally admitted to the Academy of the Arts in 1956. Although he subsequently produced some montages warning of the threat of nuclear war, he was never again as prolific as in his youth.

In East Berlin, Heartfield worked closely with theatre directors such as Benno Besson and Wolfgang Langhoff at Berliner Ensemble and Deutsches Theater. He created innovative stage set designs for Bertolt Brecht and David Berg. Using Heartfield's minimal props and stark stages, Brecht interrupted his plays at key junctures to have the audience be part of the action and not lose themselves in it.

In 1967, he visited Britain and began preparing a retrospective exhibition of his work, which was subsequently completed by his widow Gertrud and the Berlin Academy of Arts, and shown at the ICA in London in 1969.

== Works ==
He is best known for the 240 political art photomontages he created from 1930 to 1938, mainly criticising fascism and Nazism. His photomontages satirising Adolf Hitler and the Nazis often subverted Nazi symbols such as the swastika in order to undermine their propaganda message.

=== Selection of notable works ===
- Adolf, the Superman (published in the Arbeiter-Illustrierte-Zeitung [AIZ, "Workers' Illustrated Newspaper"], Berlin, 17 July 1932), used a montaged X-ray to expose gold coins in Adolf Hitler's esophagus leading to a pile in his stomach as he rants against the fatherland's enemies.
- In Göring: The Executioner of the Third Reich (AIZ, Prague, 14 September 1933), Hermann Göring is depicted as a butcher.
- The Meaning of Geneva, Where Capital Lives, There Can Be No Peace (AIZ, Berlin, 27 November 1932), shows the peace dove impaled on a blood-soaked bayonet in front of the League of Nations, where the cross on the Swiss flag is changed into a swastika.
- Hurrah, die Butter ist Alle! (Hurray, There's No Butter Left!) was published on the front page of the AIZ in 1935. A pastiche of the aesthetics of propaganda, the photomontage shows a German family at a dinner table eating a bicycle, with a portrait of Hitler hanging on the wall; the wallpaper is emblazoned with swastikas. A baby gnaws on an executioner's axe, also emblazoned with a swastika, and a dog licks an oversized nut and bolt. The title is written in large letters, in addition to a quote uttered by Hermann Göring during a food shortage. Translated, the quote reads: "Hooray, the butter is all gone!". Göring once said in an address delivered in Hamburg: "Iron ore has made the Reich strong. Butter and drippings have, at most, made the people fat".

== Death and legacy ==
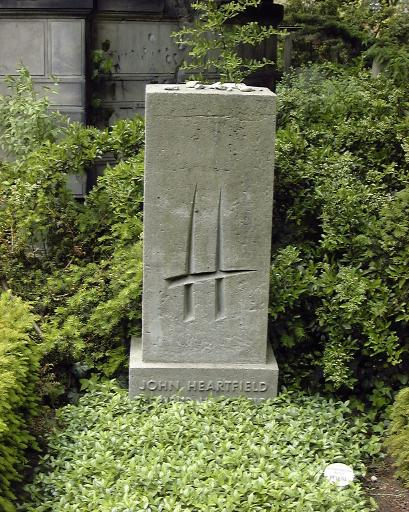
Grave of John Heartfield in Berlin

Following a lifelong history of illness, Heartfield died on 26 April 1968 in East Berlin, East Germany. He was buried in the Dorotheenstadt Cemetery, adjacent to Brecht's former home.

After his widow Gertrud Heartfield's death, the East German Academy of the Arts took possession of all of Heartfield's surviving works. When the West German Academy of Arts absorbed the East German Academy, the Heartfield Archive was transferred with it.

From November to December, 1974 the Ministry of Culture and the Academy of Arts of the Democratic Republic of Germany (East Germany) hosted an exhibition of John Heartfield photomontages at the Museum of Modern Art in Paris.

From 15 April to 6 July 1993, the New York City Museum of Modern Art hosted an exhibition of Heartfield's original montages.

In 2005, the British Tate Gallery held an exhibition of his photomontage pieces. The Museum Ludwig in Cologne held a retrospective exhibition of Marinus and Heartfield in 2008.

In 2023, Johnny & Me, an animated documentary about Heartfield directed by Katrin Rothe, was released.

== In popular culture ==
Hurray, There's No Butter Left!, was an inspiration for the song "Metal Postcard" by Siouxsie and the Banshees. This song was re-recorded in German as "Mittageisen" and released as a single in September 1979 in Germany with Heartfield's work as the cover art. A few months later the single was also released in the UK. The Swiss darkwave band Mittageisen (1981–1986) is named after this song's title.

Hurray, There's No Butter Left, was the text on the bottom of a photo of a German family, which can be found in a political comic posted into a banned communist magazine, in 1935.

Slovenian and former Yugoslav avant-garde music group Laibach has a number of references to Heartfield's works: the original band's logo, the 'black cross', references Heartfield's art Der alte Wahlspruch im "neuen" Reich: Blut und Eisen (1934), a cross made of four axes, as can be seen on the inner sleeves and labels of their 1987 album Opus Dei. The cover art of their self-titled debut album Laibach (Ropot, 1985, Ljubljana), also references Heartfield's Wie im Mittelalter… so im Dritten Reich (1934). A track called "Raus! (Herzfelde)", originally on Slovenska Akropola, but also included in Krst pod Triglavom and Opus Dei as Herzfeld (Heartfield), is about Heartfield.

British hardcore punk band Discharge used Heartfield's work "Peace and Fascism" for the cover artwork of their 7-inch EP Never Again, 1981.

English post-punk band Blurt recorded a song called "Hurray, the Butter is All Gone!" on their 1986 album Poppycock.

The Hand Has Five Fingers (5 Finger hat die Hand), a 1928 poster by Heartfield that inspired the album cover for System of a Down

Armenian-American alternative metal band System of a Down used Heartfield's poster for the Communist Party of Germany (The Hand Has Five Fingers) as cover art on their 1998 self-titled debut album.

German experimental group Einstürzende Neubauten reference Heartfield and his brother Wieland Herzfelde, as well as other Dadaist and Futurist artists such as Kurt Schwitters, Hannah Höch, George Grosz and Filippo Tommaso Marinetti in the track "Let's Do It a Dada" from their 2007 album Alles wieder offen.
