= Slavko Avsenik Jr. =

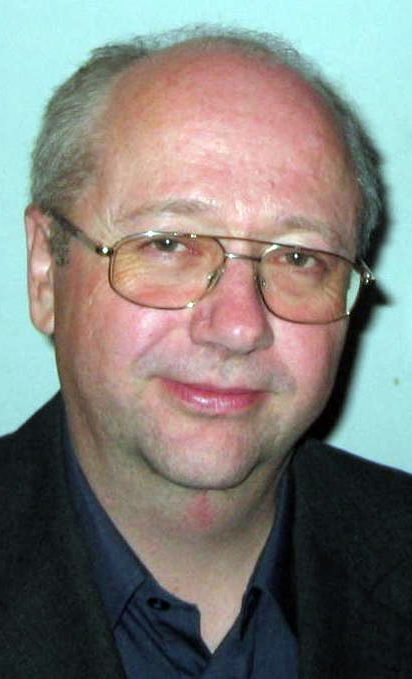

Background information
- Born: 9 April 1958; Ljubljana, SR Slovenia, SFR Yugoslavia
- Occupations: Composer; editor; arranger; songwriter; producer
- Instrument: Piano
- Years active: 1981–present

Slavko Avsenik Jr. (Slovene: Slavko Avsenik mlajši) (9 April 1958) is a Slovenian composer and pianist. He is also the author of numerous children's songs. He is the son of Slavko Avsenik.

== Biography ==
Avsenik graduated from the Academy of Music and Dramatic Arts in Graz in jazz piano, in 1981, and film music composition at Berklee College of Music in Boston, US in 1985.

During and after college he worked as a composer, arranger and producer, first in Ljubljana, then KOCH International in Austria and as a music editor at Arioli BMG in Germany.

He creates film scores and produces music for film, TV, theater, multimedia, using a wide assortment of genres of pop music, and music for children.

Avsenik collaborated with industrial music group Laibach on their album Opus dei.

== Awards ==
- 1981 Award of the Austrian Ministry of Culture
- 1993 Župančičeva Prix

== Filmography ==
- Opus Films: Remington (1988)
- The Wind in the Network (1990)
- Heart Lady (1992)
- Moran (1993)
- A Tale of Awakening (1993)
- Traveling Božidar Jakac (1994)
- Dogged (1995)
- Used Fresco (1995)
- Felix (1996)
- The Abyss (1998)
- Socialization of a Bull (1998)
- Faces of the Green River (1999)
- Hop, Skip and Jump (2000)
- In the Kingdom of Marmots (2004)

== Theater ==
- LOVRAČ, Fugitive, Bear With a Rose (A), Jeppe S Hill, Velden 200th
- LET F. Prešeren
- Lefend OF Kamniške Veronika
- STORY Soldier R. MAISTRA, Hansel and Gretel, Cuore (A)

== Discography ==
- Šmentana muha
- Spanckaj glasba za dojencke
- Izdano na medijih

== See also ==
- List of Slovenian composers
