= Zaraza =

Canadian funeral doom band

- Origin: Montreal, Quebec, Canada
- Genres: Industrial metal Death-doom; Avant-garde metal
- Years active: 1993–2006; 2015–present
- Labels: Total Zero
- Members: Jacek (The DoomHammer); Grzegorz Haus ov Doom

Zaraza (from Ukrainian, Polish, Serbian "plague") is a Canadian experimental/industrial death-doom band from Montreal, Quebec, Canada.

== Biography ==
Formed in early 1993, Zaraza was born out of a meeting between newly arrived Polish immigrant Jacek (The DoomHammer) Furmankiewicz and local Montreal industrial/noise artist Brian Meagher performing as Brian Damage (who would later adopt the Slavic name Grzegorz Haus ov Doom), with the object of fully integrating the extremes of doom/death metal with industrial. At the beginning it was intended to be a grindcore-oriented project, but they soon decided on a more doomy edge, combined with a bombastic symphonic industrial feel.

Due to the largely sampler-oriented nature of Zaraza's music, the band very rarely performed live. Its best-known live show was during a special edition of the Montreal industrial show Late Night Atrocity Exhibition. That night, in order to commemorate the 15th anniversary of the first concert of Laibach, whose early albums (from the 1980s) the band highly revered, Zaraza performed four covers: "Vier Personen," "Leben Tod," "Krvava Gruda Plodna Zemlja," and "Nova Akropola."

=== Initial period (1993–2005) ===
After releasing their first demo, Life Is Death Postponed, in 1995, received positively in the underground, Zaraza released its debut CD, Slavic Blasphemy, through the Ottawa-based Musicus Phycus label. It was released in 1997 and gathered a large number of positive reviews, and was listed as one of the Top 10 albums of 1998 by Gino Filicetti of Chronicles of Chaos webzine.

In 1999, the band recorded their second CD, No Paradise To Lose, which was supposed to include a bonus EP with three Laibach covers. However, lack of satisfaction with the final sound quality of the mixing process led to a postponement of the album. All the original recordings were discarded and the resulting self-disgust resulted in the band going on hiatus till early 2002. The same year the band performed its one and only "true" live show by opening up for Knurl and Merzbow in Ottawa, Canada.

In 2002, Zaraza restarted its activities and tackled again the task of re-recording and remixing the entire No Paradise To Lose album from scratch. In November 2003, No Paradise To Lose was finally released, containing 50 minutes of experimental industrial doom death metal, to critical acclaim. The first 50 copies of the album sold also included a four-track single of Laibach covers, "Montrealska Akropola [Tribute to Laibach]".

The band disbanded in July 2006 and released all their albums via the Internet Archive.

=== Reforming (2015–present) ===
In 2015, the band re-united and decided to work on a new album. The third album Spasms of Rebirth, was released on March 4, 2017, via the band's Bandcamp site. The album received a 9/10 rating in a doom-metal.com review.

== Members ==
- Jacek (The DoomHammer) – lead vocals, drum machine, samplers, keyboards
- Brian Damage (aka Grzegorz Haus ov Doom) – operatic vocals, samplers, keyboards

== Discography ==
- Life is Death Postponed (Demo, 1995)
- Slavic Blasphemy (CD, 1997)
- No Paradise to Lose (CD, Total Zero Records, 2003)
- Montrealska Akropola – A Tribute to Laibach (Single, Total Zero Records, 2003)
- Life Is Death Postponed (2004, CD-R reissue with bonus tracks)
- Spasms of Rebirth (Digital & CD-R, 2017)
