= Volk (album) =

Studio album by Laibach
- Released: 26 October 2006
- Recorded: Daily Girl, NSK Studio and Studio Metro (Ljubljana), The Instrument and Metropolis studios (London), Master & Servant (Hamburg)
- Genres: Industrial, neoclassical dark wave
- Length: 58:31
- Label: Mute
- Producers: Laibach and Silence

Laibach chronology
Anthems (2004)	Volk (2006)	Volk Tour London CC Club 16 April 2007 (2007)

Silence chronology
Key (2006)	Volk (2006)

Professional ratings
Review scores
Source	Rating
AllMusic	3.5/5 stars
Pitchfork	(4.8/10)
PopMatters	8/10 stars
Release Magazine	7/10 stars

Volk is the seventh studio album by Slovenian industrial group Laibach, released in 2006. The word "volk" means "people" or "nation" in German and "wolf" in Slovene. The album is a collection of thirteen songs inspired by national or pan-national anthems, plus the anthem of the Neue Slowenische Kunst (NSK) State, a fictional state invented by the band. The album is a collaboration with another Slovenian band, Silence.

The anthem of the NSK state is essentially the same arrangement as "The Great Seal", a song on their 1987 album Opus Dei. Like "The Great Seal", the words are based on Winston Churchill's "We shall fight on the beaches" speech.

== Track listing ==
1. "Germania" – based on "Das Lied der Deutschen" (Germany)
2. "America" – based on "The Star-Spangled Banner" (United States)
3. "Anglia" – based on "God Save the Queen" (United Kingdom)
4. "Rossiya" – based on the State Anthem of the Soviet Union, post-2000 "National Anthem of Russia" (Russia), and "The Internationale"
5. "Francia" – based on "La Marseillaise" (France)
6. "Italia" – based on "Il Canto degli Italiani" (Italy)
7. "España" – based on "Marcha Real" (music) and "El Himno de Riego" (lyrics) (Spain)
8. "Yisra’el" – based on "Hatikvah" (Israel) and "Fida'i" (Palestine)
9. "Türkiye" – based on "İstiklâl Marşı" (Turkey)
10. "Zhonghuá" – based on "March of the Volunteers" (People's Republic of China)
11. "Nippon" – based on "Kimi ga Yo" (Japan)
12. "Slovania" – based on "Hej Slovani" (anthem of the former Socialist Federal Republic of Yugoslavia and unofficial anthem of Pan-Slavism)
13. "Vaticanae" – based on "Inno e Marcia Pontificale" (Vatican City)
14. "NSK" – the anthem of Neue Slowenische Kunst, also known as "The Great Seal"

== Personnel ==
Album written and produced by Laibach and Silence, 2005–2006.

- Laibach are:
  - Eber
  - Saliger
  - Dachauer
  - Keller
- Silence are:
  - Boris Benko
  - Primož Hladnik
- Additional musicians:
  - Boris Benko (Silence): vocals on all tracks except 08, 09, 10 and 14
  - Yolanda Grant-Thompson: vocals on tracks 02 and 13
  - Mina Špiler (Melodrom): vocals on tracks 05 and 07
  - Maria Awa: vocals on track 07
  - Artie Fishel: vocals on track 08
  - Zed Mehmet: vocals on track 09
  - Elvira Hasanagić: vocals on track 09
  - Seaming To: vocals on track 10
  - Nagisa Moritoki: vocals on track 11
  - Brina Vogelnik Saje: vocals on track 12
  - Luka Jamnik: analogue synthesizer sounds on tracks 02, 04 and 05
  - Miha Dovžan: zither on track 06
  - Peter Dekleva: acoustic guitar on track 04
  - Anne Carruthers: cello on tracks 04 and 11
  - Alojz Zupan: conductor of brass orchestra on track 14:
    - Delavska Godba Trbovlje
  - Vitalij Osmačko: conductor of children's choir on track 04:
    - Janja Cerar
    - Dasha Khotuleva
    - Anna Vidovich
    - Nastja Yatsko
- Technical support:
  - Gregor Zemljič
  - Iztok Turk
  - Uroš Umek
- Mixing and mastering:
  - Paul PDub Walton
  - James Aparcio
  - Tom Meyer
- Project manager (Mute Records):
  - Robert Schilling
- Cover painting:
  - Laibach
- Design and layout:
  - Phant & Puntza
- Text editing:
  - Schrankmeister
- Special thanks to:
  - Daniel Miller
  - Robert Schilling
- Label: Mute Records
