= Auf der Lüneburger Heide =

German folk song

The song "Auf der Lüneburger Heide" ("On the Lüneburg Heath") was composed in 1912 by Ludwig Rahlfs based on a poem from the 1911 collection Der kleine Rosengarten (The Little Rose Garden) by Hermann Löns.

It is often played at folk festivals in this region of north Germany and is frequently part of the repertoire of local choral societies.

It gained fame outside the Lüneburg Heath as a result of the 1951 film Grün ist die Heide (The Heath Is Green) with Kurt Reimann as the singer and the 1972 film of the same name in which Roy Black sings this song. Various musicians have published their own interpretations of the song, for example the tenor Rudolf Schock on his 1985 album Stimme für Millionen (Voice for Millions). The Slovenian industrial band Laibach used the song in 1988 on their cover version of the Beatles album Let It be, replacing "Maggie Mae" with "Auf der Lüneburger Heide" (first and third verses).

== Text ==
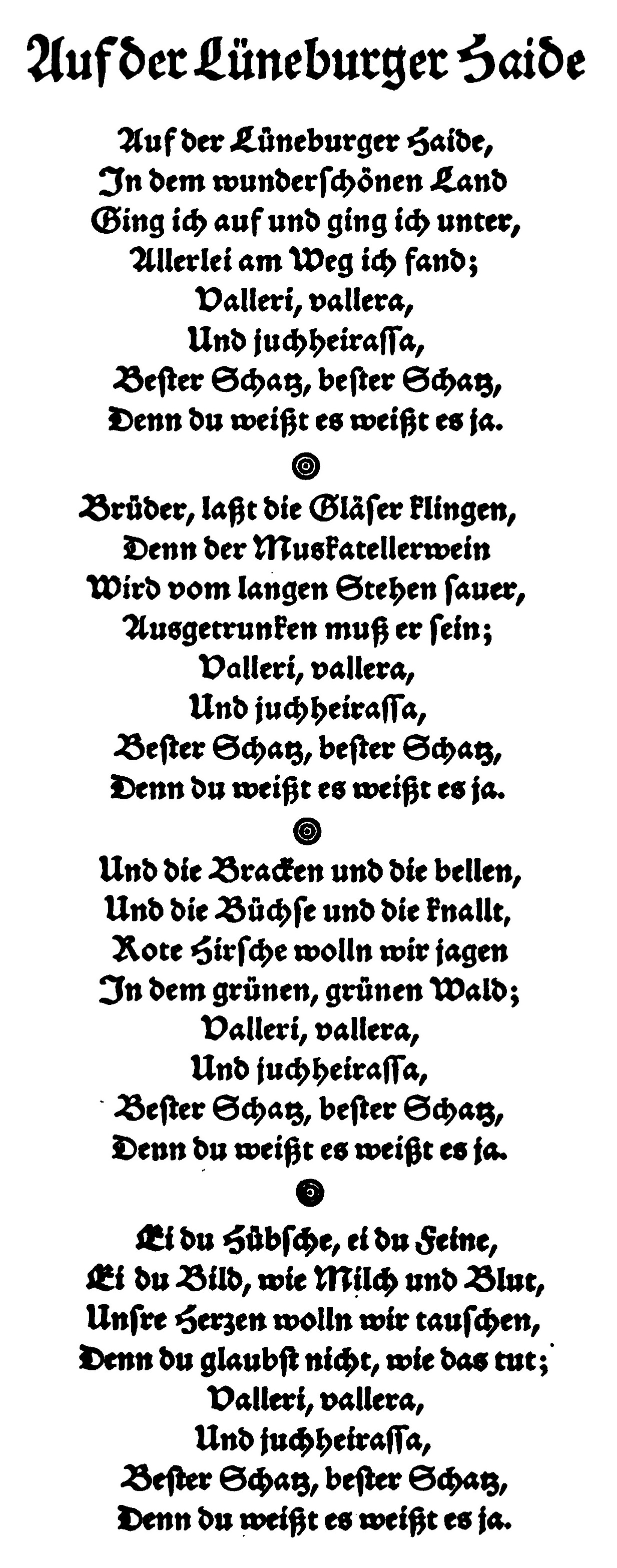
1922 edition

Auf der Lüneburger Haide,
In dem wunderschönen Land
Ging ich auf und ging ich unter,
Allerlei am Weg ich fand;
Refrain:
Valleri, vallera,
Und juchheirassa, und juchheirassa,
Bester Schatz, bester Schatz,
Denn du weißt es weißt es ja.

Brüder, laßt die Gläser klingen,
Denn der Muskatellerwein
Wird vom langen Stehen sauer,
Ausgetrunken muß er sein;
Refrain

Und die Bracken und die bellen,
Und die Büchse und die knallt,
Rote Hirsche wolln wir jagen
In dem grünen, grünen Wald;
Refrain

Ei du Hübsche, ei du Feine,
Ei du Bild, wie Milch und Blut,
Unsre Herzen wolln wir tauschen,
Denn du glaubst nicht, wie das tut;
Refrain

On the Lüneburg Heath
In that beautiful land
I walked up and I walked down,
All sorts on the way I found;
Refrain:
Valleri Vallera
And yoohirassah, and yoohirassah
Dearest love, dearest love
For you know, you know it, sure.

Brothers let our glasses clink,
For the Muscatel wine
Will become sour from standing too long,
Every drop must be drunk up;
Refrain

And the brachets (Note: 'brach' = (female) hunting hound) and they're barking,
And the rifle and it shoots,
We are off to hunt red deer
In the woods and forests green;
Refrain

Oh my beauty, oh my fair one,
With your face of lilies and roses,
We want to exchange our hearts,
For you won't believe how that feels;
Refrain

== Melody ==
MIDI rendition
