= Ljubljana–Zagreb–Beograd =

Ljubljana-Zagreb-Beograd

Live album by Laibach
- Released: 7 June 1993
- Recorded: 1982
- Genre: Industrial
- Length: 69:38
- Label: Grey Area

Laibach chronology
Kapital (1992)	Ljubljana-Zagreb-Beograd (1993)	NATO (1994)

Ljubljana–Zagreb–Beograd, released in 1993, is an album by Slovenian industrial group Laibach, recorded in 1982. It is named after three capitals of three former Yugoslav republics - Ljubljana (Slovenia), Zagreb (Croatia) and Beograd (Belgrade) (Serbia). It is predominantly a live album. The cover features Tomaž Hostnik, who committed suicide in 1982, the bleeding comes from a bottle thrown at him at that night's show.

== Track listing ==
1. "Intro" (live) – :32
2. "Unsere Geschichte" (live) (Laibach) – 1:08
3. "Rdeči molk (Red Silence)" (live) (Laibach) – 1:46
4. "Siemens" (Laibach) – 6:14
5. "Smrt za smrt (Death for Death)" (live) (Laibach) – 3:26
6. "Država (The State)" (live) (Laibach) – 6:13
7. "Zavedali so se — Poparjen je odšel I
  (They Have Been Aware — Scalded He Left I)" (live) (Laibach) – 1:52
8. "Delo in disciplina (Work and Discipline)" (live) (Laibach) – 3:51
9. "Tito-Tito" (live) (a version of Zequinha de Abreu's Tico-Tico no Fubá) – 2:12
10. "Ostati zvesti naši preteklošti — Poparjen je odšel II
  (To Stay Faithful To Our Past — Scalded He Left II)" (live) (Laibach) – 3:25
11. "Tovarna C19 (Factory C19)" (live) (Laibach) – 2:06
12. "STT (Machine Factory Trbovlje)" (live) (Laibach) – :31
13. "Sveti Urh (Saint Urch)" (live) (Laibach) – 2:01
14. "Država (The State)" (Studio Version) (Laibach) – 4:52
15. "Cari amici soldati/Jaruzelski/Država/Svoboda
  (Dear Soldier Friends/Jaruzelski/The State/Freedom)" (Laibach) – 29:29
