= WAT (album) =

Studio album by Laibach
- Released: September 8, 2003
- Genre: Post-industrial, electro-industrial, EBM
- Length: 58:23 (CD version), 62:27 (2LP version)
- Label: Mute
- Producer: Iztok Turk & Laibach

Laibach chronology
The John Peel Sessions (2002)	WAT (2003)	Anthems (2004)

Professional ratings
Review scores
Source	Rating
Allmusic	2.5/5 stars

WAT is the sixth studio album by Slovenian music group Laibach, released September 8, 2003.

The CD included a bonus video of "Tanz mit Laibach" and the vinyl LP and promo CD "Reject or Breed".

The album title is an acronym for "We Are Time" as the title track reveals.

"The point of WAT is not what Laibach is, or what it wants, but what you are and where you stand".

== CD track listing ==
1. "B Mashina" performed by Laibach / Tomi Meglič – 3:50 (83 BPM)
2. "Tanz mit Laibach" (Laibach/Meglič/Turk/Umek) – 4:19 (126 BPM)
3. "Du bist unser" (Laibach/Mlakar/Umek) – 5:38 (125 BPM)
4. "Achtung!" (Laibach/Mlakar/Turk) – 4:06 (127 BPM)
5. "Ende" (Laibach/Turk/Umek) – 3:45 (127 BPM)
6. "Now You Will Pay" (Laibach/Turk) – 6:07 (125 BPM)
7. "Hell: Symmetry" (Laibach/Turk) – 5:02 (115 BPM)
8. "Das Spiel ist aus" (Laibach/Turk) – 4:21 (130 BPM)
9. "Satanic Versus" (Laibach/Umek) – 4:52 (107 BPM)
10. "The Great Divide" (Laibach/Turk) – 5:11 (100 BPM)
11. "WAT" (Avsenik/Laibach/Turk/Umek) – 5:33 (97 BPM)
12. "Anti-Semitism" (DJ Bizzy/DJ Dojaja/Laibach/Temponauta) – 5:39 (126 BPM)

== LP track listing ==
A:

1. "B Mashina" performed by Laibach / Tomi Meglič – 3:50
2. "Tanz mit Laibach" (Laibach/Meglič/Turk/Umek) – 4:19
3. "Du bist unser" (Laibach/Mlakar/Umek) – 5:38

B:

1. "Achtung!" (Laibach/Mlakar/Turk) – 4:06
2. "Ende" (Laibach/Turk/Umek) – 3:45
3. "Reject or Breed" (Laibach/Turk) – 4:07
4. "Satanic Versus" (Laibach/Umek) – 4:52

C:

1. "Now You Will Pay" (Laibach/Turk) – 6:07
2. "Hell: Symmetry" (Laibach/Turk) – 5:02
3. "Das Spiel ist aus" (Laibach/Turk) – 4:21

D:

1. "The Great Divide" (Laibach/Turk) – 5:11
2. "WAT" (Avsenik/Laibach/Turk/Umek) – 5:33
3. "Anti-Semitism" (DJ Bizzy/DJ Dojaja/Laibach/Temponauta) – 5:39
