= Laibach (album) =

Studio album by Laibach
- Released: 27 April 1985
- Recorded: 1983
- Studio: Studio Metro (Ljubljana)
- Genres: Martial industrial; industrial
- Length: 40:59
- Label: ŠKUC (Student Cultural Centre)

Laibach chronology
Laibach (1985)	Rekapitulacija 1980–1984 (1985)

Professional ratings
Review scores
Source	Rating
AllMusic	4/5 stars

Laibach is the debut studio album by the Slovenian and Yugoslav avant-garde music group Laibach. It was first released on LP in 1985 by ŠKUC (Student Cultural Centre), and later reissued on CD in 1991 with two bonus tracks composed by Laibach's sub-group 300.000 V.K. Another CD reissue in 1999 featured further bonus material.

== Track listing ==
Side one
No.	Title	Length
1.	"Cari Amici Soldati (Dear Soldier Friends)"	1:51
2.	"Sila (Force)"	4:03
3.	"Sredi Bojev (In the Midst of Struggles)"	8:09
4.	"Država (State)"	4:20

Side two
No.	Title	Length
5.	"Dekret (Decree)"	4:26
6.	"Mi kujemo bodočnost! (We Are Forging the Future!)"	4:45
7.	"Brat moj (My Brother)"	5:59
8.	"Panorama"	4:57
Total length:		40:59

1991 CD bonus tracks
No.	Title	Length
9.	"N.Y. 1984 – Policijski hit (The Police Hit)"	3:27
10.	"Prva TV generacija (The First TV Generation)"	3:02

1999 CD bonus tracks
No.	Title	Length
11.	"Der Zivilisation (The Civilisation)"	4:50
12.	"L'Homme armé (The Armed Man)"	4:19
13.	"One Plus One"	9:05
