= Liberation Day (film) =

2016 music documentary film

- Directed by: Uģis Olte; Morten Traavik
- Written by: Morten Traavik
- Produced by: Uldis Cekulis
- Starring: Laibach
- Cinematography: Sven Erling Brusletto; Valdis Celmins
- Edited by: Gatis Belogrudovs; Uģis Olte
- Production companies: VFS Films; Traavik; Norsk Fjernsyn; Staragara
- Release date: 19 November 2016 (International Documentary Festival Amsterdam)
- Running time: 100 minutes
- Countries: Latvia; Norway; Slovenia
- Language: English

Liberation Day is a 2016 music documentary film directed by Uģis Olte and Morten Traavik. It follows the Slovenian band Laibach as it travels to North Korea in 2015 to be the first Western band to play in the country, performing songs from The Sound of Music as part of the National Liberation Day programme.

Laibach released an album with its interpretations of the songs in 2018, The Sound of Music.
