= Rekapitulacija 1980–1984 =

Compilation album by Laibach
- Released: May 9, 1985
- Recorded: 1980–1984
- Genre: Industrial
- Length: 65:21
- Language: Slovenian
- Label: Walter Ulbricht Schallfolien

Laibach chronology
Laibach (1985)	Rekapitulacija 1980–1984 (1985)	Nova Akropola (1986)

Rekapitulacija 1980–1984 is a retrospective album by the Slovenian industrial group Laibach. It was first released as a double LP boxset in 1985, and re-released on CD in 1987.

On the cover is a kozolec, an ancient iconic Slovene hayrack.

== Background ==
In January 1984 Laibach signed a contract with independent label Walter Ulbricht Schallfolien, from Hamburg, for a double LP retrospective release entitled REKAPITULACIJA 1980–1984 (RECAPITULATION 1980–1984). The album was released on 9 May 1985. This was the first of the group's records to gain an international release. The track "Ti, ki izzivaš" includes a sample from the soundtrack of the movie Psycho.

== Track listing ==
1. "Cari Amici" (English: Dear Friends) - 2:07
2. "Zmagoslavje volje" (Triumph des Willens) (English: The Triumph of Will) - 4:48
3. "Jaruzelsky" - 4:49
4. "Smrt za smrt (Tod für Tod)" (English: Death for Death) - 2:16
5. "Sila (Macht)" (English: Power) - 4:01
6. "Dokumenti (Dokumente") / "Sredi bojev (Inmitten von Kämpfen)" (English: Documents / In The Midst of Struggles) 12:16
7. "Panorama 14" / "Mi kujemo bodočnost (Wir schmieden die Zukunft)" (English: Panorama 14 \ We Are Forging The Future) - 5:38
8. "Brat moj (Bruder mein)" (English: Brother of Mine) - 6:03
9. "Slovenska žena (Slowenische Frau)" (English: The Slovene Woman) - 4:03
10. "Boji (Kämpfe)" (English: Fights) - 8:08
11. "Ti, ki izzivaš (Du, der Du herausforderst)" (English: You, who challenges) - 6:07
12. "Perspektive (Perspektiven)" (English: Perspective) - 4:43
13. "Mars" - 0:22

Total time: 65:21

NB: Reedited in 2002 with the following bonus tracks:

1. "Vade retro Satanas"
2. "Smrt za smrt"
