= Melodrom =

- Origin: Slovenia
- Genres: Electronic; Experimental music Alternative music Synthpop
- Years active: 1999–present
- Label: Nika Records
- Members: Mina Špiler; Matevž Kolenc; Matej Nolda; Miha Žargi; Polona Janežič

Melodrom are a Slovenian alternative synthpop band, founded in 1999.

== Beginnings ==
The band, originally Marquee, was founded in 1999 at the Slovenian Cinematheque, by three arts students and two students of architecture. The band's initial purpose was to create a soundtrack for a new film by Jurij Meden. The soundtrack was recorded in 2000, but the film was never actually shot. The band's created music for several theater performances and shows. They recorded music for the theatre performance Zvitorepka, directed by Aleš Korpič, and various dance performances by Bara Kolenc, including Razobraz (2001), Čečečečebula (2002), Brezdno (2004) and, most recently, Zimska pravljica (2004) by Borut Bučinel. In the autumn of 2002 the band collaborated with the designer Uroš Belantič of the Oktober fashion house to create the music for their spring/summer 2003 collection fashion show. The catalogue representing the collection was accompanied by Melodrom’s promotional first single.

Melodrom's career as a "proper and independent" band began in March 2001 with the concert in Gromka club at Metelkova mesto. They started preparing material and recorded their first demos. Some of the recordings found their way to Radio Študent station, were aired successfully and, consequently, the song "Extemporary Ending" (called "Pet petnajst" in the Slovene version) reached fourth place on the International Crossradio chart of best singles of 2001. In 2004 they reached seventh place with the song "Duet". After the first recordings and initial radio success, the band had increasingly more concerts. A few concerts in Slovenia and Croatia (Močvara) established them as a promising young band and thus they were selected for the second Club Marathon tour organized by Radio Student which enabled them to have concerts all over Slovenia. They also played in Austria, Germany and Serbia and Montenegro.

== Debut album ==
In July 2003, Melodrom recorded their first album, produced by Jaka Jarc. A first video, "Prenzlauer Allee", was aired successfully on the national and commercial TV stations. Having first planned to release the album independently in October 2003, good reviews and interest from record companies led to the release being postponed. After months of negotiating, Melodrom signed to Nika Records in February 2004. After some additional recording sessions and translation of some song lyrics, originally written in English, into Slovene, the album went through the production process again under the supervision of Iztok Turk. It was finally released in September 2004 under the title Melodrom. It has been chosen as album of the year 2004 by Polet and Vikend magazines and the Videospotnice TV music show. In 2005 an English version of the album was rereleased by Mascom Records.

== Collaboration ==
Melodrom have collaborated with DJ Umek and the band Rotor. Mina Spiler sang a beautiful song with Francky Vincent in Paris in 2014. Mina has worked with Laibach on their remix of Rammstein's song "Ohne Dich" and also joined Laibach on their Volk tour in 2006 as a replacement for Boris Benko of Silence.

She then worked steadily with Laibach until 2018 (when she left on maternity leave after giving birth), and still does projects and special concerts with them here and there.

Kolenc has composed and produced songs and theater music for Laibach.

Špiler and Kolenc (together with producer YILA and visual artist Atej Tutta), also collaborate on the project "KREDA".

== Albums ==
- Melodrom (2004)
- The Guide (2006)
- Variacije (remixes) (2008)
- Vse kar si pustila da leži na tleh (2010)

== Line-up ==
- Mina Špiler (vocals)
- Matevž Kolenc (guitar, programming)
- Miha Žargi (bass)
- Matej Nolda (drums)
- Polona Janežič (keyboards)
