= Die Pleite =

Die Pleite was a German periodical founded and edited by George Grosz, Wieland Herzfelde, and John Heartfield, which ran from 1919 to 1924.

The magazine was part of the Berlin Dada scene and was known for its ruthless critiques of the Weimar Republic in addition to its prescient awareness of the emergence of right-wing extremism throughout Europe.
