= Anthems (Laibach album) =

Laibach Anthems

Compilation album by Laibach
- Released: 4 October 2004
- Genre: Industrial, post-industrial, martial industrial
- Length: Disc 1: 78:03; Disc 2: 77:59
- Label: Mute
- Producer: ???

Laibach chronology
WAT (2003)	Laibach Anthems (2004)	Volk (2006)

Professional ratings
Review scores
Source	Rating
Release Magazine	6/10 stars

Anthems is a compilation by the Slovenian industrial music group Laibach. It was released in 2004 as a double album. The first CD contains a collection of Laibach's best tracks throughout the years, while the second disc accommodates remixes of Laibach songs by different artists. Besides the CDs, the Anthems box also contains a 44-page booklet with a history of Laibach plus several paintings and photographs by and of the band.

== Track listing ==
=== Disc one ===
1. "Das Spiel ist aus" – 3:18
2. "Tanz mit Laibach" – 4:17
3. "Final Countdown" – 5:39
4. "Alle gegen alle" – 3:52
5. "Wirtschaft ist tot" – 3:45
6. "God is God" – 3:42
7. "In the Army Now" – 4:31
8. "Get Back" – 4:22
9. "Sympathy for the Devil" – 5:34
10. "Leben heißt Leben" – 5:26
11. "Geburt einer Nation" – 4:21
12. "Opus Dei" – 5:01
13. "Die Liebe" – 3:52
14. "Panorama" – 4:52
15. "Država" – 4:19
16. "Brat moj" – 6:02
17. "Mama Leone" – 4:51

=== Disc two ===
1. "Das Spiel ist aus - Ouroborots mix" – 4:05
2. "Liewerk - 3.Oktober Kraftbach mix" – 4:21
3. "Wir tanzen Ado Hynkel - Zeta Reticula mix" – 5:39
4. "Final Countdown - Beyond the infinite Juno reactor mix" – 7:37
5. "God is God - Optikal vocal mix" – 5:44
6. "War - ultraviolence meets Hitman mix" – 6:19
7. "God is God - diabolig mix" – 3:36
8. "Final Countdown - Mark Stent alternate mix" – 5:48
9. "Wirtschaft ist tot - late night mix" – 5:22
10. "Jesus Christ Superstar - Random logic mix" – 6:22
11. "Wirtschaft - R. Hawtin hardcore noise mix" – 5:18
12. "Brat moj - Randomlogic mix" – 5:09
13. "Smrt za smrt - Octex mix" – 7:02
14. "WAT - iTurk mix" – 5:29

== Trivia ==
- "Mama Leone" was the only new song on this compilation.
