= Baptism (Laibach album) =

Soundtrack album by Laibach
- Released: 16 November 1987
- Genre: Martial industrial, industrial, classical
- Length: 71:47 (CD version)
- Label: Sub Rosa
- Producer: Laibach & J.T.

Laibach chronology
Slovenska Akropola (1987)	Baptism (1987)	Let It Be (1988)

Professional ratings
Review scores
Source	Rating
AllMusic	3/5 stars
NME	8/10

Baptism (full title Krst pod Triglavom - Baptism Below Triglav) is soundtrack album by Laibach. It is the soundtrack to the Neue Slowenische Kunst production of the same name. All music and lyrics by Laibach, except where noted.

== Track listing ==
=== LP ===
The 2LP version (released as a box with the two records, an LP-sized booklet and two posters) has the following tracks:

819-822:

1. "Hostnik"
2. "Jezero" (Lake)
3. "Valjhun"
4. "Delak"
5. "Koža" (Skin)

1095-1270:

1. "Jägerspiel" (Hunters' Game)
2. "Bogomila - Verführung" (Bogomila - Seduction)
3. "Wienerblut" (Viennese Blood)

1961-1982:

1. "Črtomir"
2. "Jelengar"
3. "Apologija Laibach" (Laibach Apology)

1983-1987:

1. "Herzfeld" (Heartfield)
2. "Krst" (Baptism)
3. "Germania"
4. "Rdeči pilot" (Red Pilot)

=== CD ===
The CD version has the same songs (except "Hostnik", which is only on the 2LP), but with slightly different - incorrect - track divisions:

1. "Jezero/Valjhun/Delak" – 11:00
2. "Koža" – 3:57
3. "Jägerspiel" – 7:25
4. "Bogomila - Verführung" – 3:54
5. "Wienerblut" – 7:00
6. "Črtomir" – 4:51
7. "Jelengar" – 2:41
8. "Apologija Laibach" – 12:24
9. "Herzfeld" – 4:48
10. "Krst/Germania" – 12:50
11. "Rdeči pilot" – 1:00
