= Engineers of the human soul =

Term applied to writers and other cultural workers by Joseph Stalin

Chinese name
- Traditional Chinese: 人類靈魂的工程師
- Simplified Chinese: 人类灵魂的工程师
Transcriptions
Standard Mandarin
- Hanyu Pinyin: rénlèi línghún de gōngchéngshī
Yue: Cantonese
- Jyutping: jan4leoi6 ling4wan4 dik1 gung1cing4si1

Russian name
- Russian: Инженеры человеческих душ
- Romanization: Inzhenery chelovecheskikh dush

"Engineers of the human soul" was a term applied to writers and other cultural workers by Joseph Stalin.

== In the Soviet Union ==
The phrase was apparently coined by Yury Olesha. Viktor Shklovsky said that Olesha used it in a meeting with Stalin at the home of Maxim Gorky, and it was subsequently used by Stalin, who said «Как метко выразился товарищ Олеша, писатели — инженеры человеческих душ» ("As comrade Olesha aptly expressed himself, writers are engineers of human souls").

During his meeting with writers in preparation for the first Congress of the Union of Soviet Writers, Stalin said: "The production of souls is more important than the production of tanks.... And therefore I raise my glass to you, writers, the engineers of the human soul" (Joseph Stalin, "Speech at home of Maxim Gorky", 26 October 1932). It was taken up by Andrei Zhdanov and developed into the idea of Socialist realism.

== China ==
Deng Xiaoping spoke approvingly of "engineers of the human soul" in the post-Mao era, while also condemning the "Gang of Four". Deng stated:

Writers and artists should conscientiously study Marxism-Leninism and Mao Zedong Thought so as to enhance their own ability to understand and analyse life and to see through appearances to the essence. We hope that more and more comrades in their ranks will become real engineers of the human soul. In order to educate the people, one must first be educated himself; in order to give nourishment to the people, one must first absorb nourishment himself. And who is to educate and nourish our writers and artists? According to Marxism, the answer can only be: the people.

In 2018, Xi Jinping, general secretary of the Chinese Communist Party, stated that “Teachers are the engineers of the human soul and the inheritors of human civilization. They carry the important task of spreading knowledge, spreading ideas, spreading truth, shaping soul, shaping life, and shaping newcomers. The fundamental task of education must be nurturing capable young people well-prepared to join the socialist cause. Better education and guidance are needed to build the noble ideal of Communism and the common ideal of socialism with Chinese characteristics among the students.”

== See also ==
- New Soviet man
- Soviet dissidents
- Helmholtz Watson
- Claude Adrien Helvétius
- Nature versus nurture

General

- Propaganda in the Soviet Union
- Propaganda in China
- Social engineering (political science)
