= Spectre (Laibach album) =

Studio album by Laibach
- Released: March 3, 2014
- Genre: Martial industrial, neoclassical dark wave, electro-industrial
- Length: 56:52
- Label: Mute

Laibach chronology
An Introduction To … Laibach / Reproduction Prohibited (2012)	Spectre (2014)	Spectremix (2015)

Singles from Laibach
- 1. "The Whistleblowers" Released: March 3, 2014

Professional ratings
Aggregate scores
Source	Rating
Metacritic	73/100
Review scores
Source	Rating
AllMusic	4/5 stars
MusicOMH	4/5 stars
Pitchfork	4.9/10
The Quietus	Favourable

Spectre is the eighth studio album by Laibach. It was released on March 3, 2014 under Mute Records.

== Track listing ==
Tracks 11-14 are bonus tracks, featured on the extended version of the album.

No.	Title	Length
1.	"The Whistleblowers"	3:31
2.	"No History"	3:16
3.	"Eat Liver!"	3:10
4.	"Americana"	4:28
5.	"We Are Millions and Millions Are One"	4:22
6.	"Eurovision"	4:38
7.	"Walk With Me"	3:55
8.	"Bossanova"	3:10
9.	"Resistance is Futile"	6:54
10.	"Koran"	5:22
11.	"The Parade"	4:04
12.	"Love On the Beat"	3:20
13.	"Just Say No!"	2:30
14.	"See That My Grave is Kept Clean"	4:05

''Love On the Beat'' is a cover of a Serge Gainsbourg song. "See That My Grave Is Kept Clean" was written and originally recorded by Blind Lemon Jefferson.
