= Dejan Knez =

Slovenian musician and artist

Dejan Knez (born 18 May 1961 in Trbovlje) is a Slovenian artist, musician, painter and founder and member of the group Laibach.

He is the son of the Slovenian painter Janez Knez. In 1978, he formed the band Salte Morale, which would later evolve into Laibach in 1980. Soon after, Knez formed the side project 300.000 V.K.

Today, Knez is working under the pseudonyms Baron Carl von Reichenbach and Der Sturm. He is also a painter, and during the promotion of the 300.000 V.K. "Titan" CD, he exhibited his paintings. Currently, he is preparing the new 300.000 V.K. album titled Dark Side of Europe.
