= Let It Be (Laibach album) =

Studio album by Laibach
- Released: 24 October 1988
- Recorded: 1988
- Genre: Martial industrial
- Length: 42:31
- Label: Mute
- Producers: Laibach, Bertrand Burgalat

Laibach chronology
Krst pod Triglavom - Baptism (1987)	Let It Be (1988)	Macbeth (1990)

Professional ratings
Review scores
Source	Rating
AllMusic	4.5/5 stars

Let It Be is a cover album by the Slovenian avant-garde group Laibach. It was released in 1988 and is a cover of the Beatles' 1970 album Let It Be. It was recorded in Laibach style with military rhythms and choirs, although a few tracks deviate from this formula, most notably "Across the Universe" featuring Anja Rupel of Videosex. The title track is omitted and "Maggie Mae" is replaced by the German folk song "Auf der Lüneburger Heide" in combination with "Was gleicht wohl auf Erden". "For You Blue" begins with Moondog's "Crescent Moon March", which is subsequently used as a counter-melody. "One After 909" includes a small portion of "Smoke on the Water", originally written and recorded by the band Deep Purple.

== Track listing ==
All songs written by Lennon-McCartney, except where noted.

1. "Get Back" – 4:25
2. "Two of Us" – 4:04
3. "Dig a Pony" – 4:40
4. "I Me Mine" (George Harrison) – 4:41
5. "Across the Universe" – 4:15
6. "Dig It" (Lennon, McCartney, Harrison, Richard Starkey) – 1:32
7. "I've Got a Feeling" – 4:34
8. "The Long and Winding Road" – 1:49
9. "One After 909" – 3:20
10. "For You Blue" (Harrison, Hardin) – 5:10
11. "Maggie Mae" ("Auf der Lüneburger Heide" & "Was gleicht wohl auf Erden") (composed by Ludwig Rahlfs with lyrics based on a poem by Hermann Löns) – 3:41

"Across the Universe" and "I Me Mine" are incorrectly listed on the CD packaging – their order is swapped.

== Production ==
Producer Bertrand Burgalat tells about the song Dig a Pony: “I composed the music for ‘Dig a Pony’ entirely from the lyrics without having listened to the original. Even today I’m not sure if I know the original. When I started listening to rock music back when I was 10, The Beatles were too obvious.”

== Legacy ==
In 2015 Let It Be album cover was ranked 16th on the list of 100 Greatest Album Covers of Yugoslav Rock published by web magazine Balkanrock.
