= Neue Slowenische Kunst =

Art collective

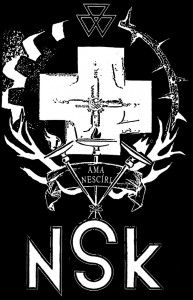
Logo of Neue Slowenische Kunst

Neue Slowenische Kunst (German: [ˈnɔʏə sloˈveːnɪʃə ˈkʊnst]; NSK; German for 'New Slovenian Art') is a political art collective that formed in Slovenia in 1984, when the Socialist Republic of Slovenia was part of the Socialist Federal Republic of Yugoslavia. NSK's name was chosen to reflect the theme in its works of the complicated relationship Slovenes have had with Germans. The name of NSK's music wing, Laibach, is also the German name of the Slovene capital Ljubljana. The name created controversy because some felt it evoked memories of the Nazi annexation of Slovenia during the Second World War. It also refers to Slovenia's previous seven centuries as part of the Habsburg monarchy.

== Composition ==
NSK was founded by the musical group Laibach. Other NSK members include groups such as IRWIN (visual art), Scipion Nasice Sisters Theatre (also known as Red Pilot and Cosmokinetic Theatre Noordung), New Collective Studio (graphics; also known as New Collectivism), Retrovision (film and video), and the Department of Pure and Applied Philosophy (theory). The founding groups of the NSK were Laibach, IRWIN, and Scipion Nasice Sisters Theater. Membership has traditionally been open to all artistic groups who show an interest in challenging the norms and taboos of Slovene national identity.

== Characteristics ==
NSK art often draws on symbols from totalitarian or extreme nationalist movements, often appropriating totalitarian kitsch in a visual style reminiscent of Dada. NSK artists often juxtapose symbols from different (and often incompatible) political ideologies. For example, a 1987 NSK-designed poster caused a scandal by winning a competition for the Yugoslavian Youth Day Celebration. The poster appropriated a painting by Nazi artist Richard Klein, replacing the flag of Nazi Germany with the Yugoslav flag and the German eagle with a dove. Intended as an ironic joke, the painting soon fell foul of the authorities, who interpreted it as equating Marshal Josip Broz Tito with Adolf Hitler. It was later reproduced on the cover of Mladina magazine, and that particular issue was subsequently banned.

The NSK was the subject of a 1996 documentary film entitled Predictions of Fire (Prerokbe Ognja), which was written and directed by Michael Benson. Among those interviewed is Slovenian intellectual Slavoj Žižek.

== NSK State ==
Since 1991, the NSK has claimed to be a sovereign state of sorts. As such, displays of its members' work are performed under the guise of an embassy, or a territory of the supposed state. Since 1994, the NSK has maintained consulates in several cities, including Umag, Croatia. It has also issued passports and postage stamps. NSK passports are considered an art project. As such, they are not valid for travel. Laibach's 2006 album Volk, which consisted of songs based on national anthems, included a national anthem of NSK, an arrangement of the Laibach song "The Great Seal". In 2010, the first NSK Citizens Congress was held in Berlin. It was followed by a "NSK Rendez-Vous" in Lyon, France, where Alexei Monroe revealed NSK's aim : to make people "aware that totalitarianism isn't a discrete historical phenomenon which went on from 1933 to 1989 and then it's over so let's have a nice triumph of liberal democracy". On 26 February 2011, another "NSK Rendez-Vous" took place in London. In 2012, yet another "NSK Rendez-Vous" was set to take place in New York City's Museum of Modern Art. 2017 saw NSK set up a pavilion at the Venice Biennale where Slavoj Žižek stated that "the uniqueness of NSK is this idea of the 'stateless state'.

== See also ==
- Noordung (NSK)
- Culture of Slovenia
- New wave music in Yugoslavia
