= DJ Umek discography =

- EPs: 215
- Compilation albums: many

The following is the discography of DJ Umek, including albums and singles. Aliases include Alba Patera, Error, Kemu, Mumps, Nuca, Polyvinyl, Ratcapa, Thorax, and Zeta Reticula.

== EPs ==
=== 1990s ===
| Year | Title | Artist(s) | Label | Notes |
|---|---|---|---|---|
| 1996 | Thorax | Thorax | ABsense | |
| 1996 | Thorax 2 | Thorax | ABsense | |
| 1996 | Escalator | UMEK | ZET | |
| 1997 | Oxetal / Aspirin | UMEK | ZET | |
| 1997 | Audio | UMEK | ZET | |
| 1997 | AB008 | UMEK | ABsense | |
| 1997 | Glutamate | UMEK | Communique Records | |
| 1997 | Lek EP | UMEK | Planet Rhythm Records | |
| 1997 | Krka EP | UMEK | Planet Rhythm Records | |
| 1997 | Sample Rate EP | UMEK | X-Sub | |
| 1997 | EX001 | UMEK | Expire | |
| 1997 | EX006 | UMEK | Expire | |
| 1998 | Catapresan EP | UMEK | Element Com | |
| 1998 | 732 | UMEK | Colours | |
| 1998 | AB016 | UMEK | ABsense | |
| 1998 | Prepidil | UMEK | X-Sub | |
| 1998 | Al Kva? | DJ Misjah vs. UMEK | X-Sub | |
| 1998 | 12SPIEL03 | Nuca | Spiel-Zeug Schallplatten | |
| 1998 | Guma EP | Ratcapa | Planet Rhythm Records | |
| 1998 | Radiogram | Tiga | Planet Rhythm Records | |
| 1998 | Urtoxen EP | Umek | Black Nation Records | |
| 1998 | Polyvinyl 2x12 | Polyvinyl | ABsense | |
| 1999 | AB018 | Polyvinyl | ABsense | |
| 1999 | AB019 | Polyvinyl | ABsense | |
| 1999 | Lanicor | UMEK | Consumer Recreation | |
| 1999 | Nodlocnost | UMEK | Spiel-Zeug Schallplatten | |
| 1999 | Difolvon EP | UMEK | CLR | |
| 1999 | Kilevox EP | UMEK | CLR | |
| 1999 | Lanicor | UMEK | Consumer Recreation | |
| 1999 | Mechanisms A - D | Mumps | Tortured Records | |
| 1999 | Made In Slovenia EP | UMEK, Inigo Kennedy | Expire | |
| 1999 | Audio 16 | UMEK, Ben Long | Fine Audio Recordings | |
| 1999 | Hear No Evil, Play No Evil, Dance No Evil | Recyclopaedia Eclectronica | Recycled Loops | |
| 1999 | Six Is Nine EP | Recycled Loops | Primevil | |

=== 2000s ===
| Year | Title | Artist(s) | Label | Notes |
|---|---|---|---|---|
| 2000 | Kial 05 | UMEK | Kial | |
| 2000 | Glurenorm | UMEK | Spiel-Zeug Schallplatten | |
| 2000 | Contra EP | UMEK | Phont Music | |
| 2000 | The Right Time EP | UMEK | Jericho | |
| 2000 | Voices Of Africa Volume 1 | UMEK | Primate Recordings | |
| 2000 | Downtown EP | Chris Liebing, UMEK | Primate Recordings | |
| 2000 | EP 1 | Zeta Reticula | Electrix Records | |
| 2000 | EP 2 | Zeta Reticula | Electrix Records | |
| 2000 | Body Re:Fuel | Recycled Loops | Recycled Loops | |
| 2000 | Earresistible | Recyclopaedia Eclectronica | Recycled Loops | |
| 2000 | Mechanisms E - L | Mumps | Tortured Records | |
| 2000 | Tog EP | Alba Patera | Monoïd | |
| 2001 | Oranazol | UMEK | Jericho | |
| 2001 | The X EP | UMEK | Potential | |
| 2001 | Consumer Recreation EP | UMEK | Green Force | |
| 2001 | Consumer Recreation EP | UMEK | Primate Recordings | |
| 2001 | Ex Machina Ad Astra | UMEK | Recycled Loops | |
| 2001 | Težka Mašinerija | UMEK | Consumer Recreation | |
| 2001 | Fantom | Kemu | Earresistible Musick | |
| 2001 | Assymmetric | Kemu | Earresistible Musick | |
| 2001 | Telstar | Kemu | Earresistible Musick | |
| 2001 | Imperial Leather / Mechanisms E | Ben Long, UMEK | Painkillers | |
| 2001 | EP 3 | Zeta Reticula | Electrix Records | |
| 2001 | Mechanisms M - P | Mumps | Tortured Records | |
| 2001 | Exerciser | Recyclopaedia Eclectronica | Recycled Loops | |
| 2002 | Voices Of Africa Volume 2 | UMEK | Primate Recordings | |
| 2002 | Libido | UMEK | Tehnika | |
| 2002 | Neuro | UMEK | Tehnika | |
| 2002 | Fenaton / Jakaton | UMEK | Bugged Out | |
| 2002 | Gatex (Disc 1) | UMEK | Magic Muzik | |
| 2002 | Gatex (Disc 2) | UMEK | Magic Muzik | |
| 2002 | Gatex (Remixes) | UMEK | Magic Muzik | |
| 2002 | Oranazol Part 2 | UMEK | Jericho | |
| 2002 | Tikonal | UMEK | NovaMute Records | |
| 2002 | Los Tuljios Part 2 | Los Tujilios | Wetmusik | |
| 2002 | Suna Talat EP | Los Tujilios | Wetmusik | |
| 2002 | Voodoo 3 | UMEK, Ignition Technician | Voodoo Records | |
| 2002 | Afrotek | Kemu, Shark | Earresistible Musick | |
| 2003 | Voices Of Africa Volume 3 | UMEK | Primate Recordings | |
| 2003 | Gatex | UMEK | Insolent Music | |
| 2003 | Telontol | UMEK | NovaMute Records | |
| 2003 | Conexan EP | UMEK | Tial Records | |
| 2003 | Bodycounter EP | UMEK | Consumer Recreation | |
| 2003 | Pharmacid EP | UMEK | Consumer Recreation | |
| 2003 | Tonatol EP | UMEK | Consumer Recreation | |
| 2003 | The Exorciser | UMEK | Recycled Loops | |
| 2003 | Filmofil EP | Recycled Loops | Recycled Loops | |
| 2003 | EP 4 | Zeta Reticula | Electrix Records | |
| 2004 | Uxen EP | UMEK | Jericho | |
| 2004 | Trust No One EP | UMEK | Consumer Recreation | |
| 2004 | Hivid EP | UMEK | Consumer Recreation | |
| 2004 | Zulu Samurai | UMEK | Recon Warriors | |
| 2004 | The Ruler Allows Mischief | Polyvinyl | Phont Music | |
| 2004 | Tomorrow World | Polyvinyl | Genetic Recordings | |
| 2004 | Mechanisms Q - S | Mumps | Tortured Records | |
| 2006 | I Am Ready EP | UMEK | Astrodisco | |
| 2006 | Another Matter Entirely | UMEK | Jesus Loved You | |
| 2006 | Posing As Me EP | UMEK | Earresistible Musick | |
| 2006 | Overtake And Command | UMEK | Code X | |
| 2007 | Carbon Occasions | UMEK | Earresistible Musick | |
| 2007 | Akul EP | UMEK | Audiomatique Records | |
| 2007 | Print This Story | UMEK | Manual Music | |
| 2007 | Anxious On Demand | UMEK, I Turk | Confused Records | |
| 2008 | Generation After EP | UMEK | Italo Business | |
| 2008 | Gatex EP | UMEK | 1605 | |
| 2008 | Vice Grip | UMEK | Circle Music | |
| 2008 | Complex Puzzle | UMEK | Proton Music | |
| 2008 | Utopia EP | UMEK | Renaissance Recordings | |
| 2008 | One Option & The Santien Race | UMEK, Matthew Hoag | Little Mountain Records | |
| 2008 | Carbon Occasions | UMEK, Andja | Ultra Records | |
| 2008 | Army Of Two | UMEK, Beltek | Pilot6 Recordings | |
| 2009 | Is It / Longer Trail | UMEK, Beltek | Pilot6 Recordings | |
| 2009 | Slap | UMEK | 1605 | |
| 2009 | Curved Trajectory EP | UMEK | 1605 | |
| 2009 | Work This Data | UMEK | Dataworx Digital | |
| 2009 | You Might Hear Nothing | UMEK | Dataworx Digital | |
| 2009 | You Might Hear Nothing The Remixes | UMEK | Dataworx Digital | |
| 2009 | Carbon Occasions | UMEK | Pacha Records | |
| 2009 | Twisted Route EP | UMEK | Soundz | |
| 2009 | Heat Mode EP | UMEK | Jericho | |
| 2009 | 16th Century Japan EP | UMEK | Astrodisco | |
| 2009 | Designed Persona | UMEK | Tronic | |
| 2009 | Destructible Environment | UMEK | 1605 | |
| 2009 | Dementia EP | UMEK | Hell Yeah Recordings | |
| 2009 | S Cream | UMEK | Hell Yeah Recordings | |
| 2009 | Hablando | UMEK, Ramirez | 1605 | |
| 2009 | Blinking Indicator EP | UMEK, Siniša Lukić | 1605 | |
| 2009 | Reason Revealed | UMEK, Tomy DeClerque | Terminal M | |
| 2009 | Mindflexes / Pravim Haos | UMEK, Mugwump | Cocoon Recordings | |

=== 2010s ===
| Year | Title | Artist(s) | Label | Notes |
|---|---|---|---|---|
| 2010 | Freaks On The Floor | UMEK, PHNTM | 1605 | |
| 2010 | Popgirls | UMEK, Jay Lumen | 1605 | |
| 2010 | Sinful Ladies | UMEK, Jay Lumen | Great Stuff Recordings | |
| 2010 | Back In The Race | UMEK, Beltek | Cr2 Records | |
| 2010 | "We Are Not Done Yet" | UMEK, Beltek | 303Lovers | |
| 2010 | Novi Sad | UMEK | Great Stuff Recordings | |
| 2010 | Fire Fight / Ljubljana | UMEK | Intec Digital | |
| 2010 | Card Gamble | UMEK | hotfingers | |
| 2010 | Chase The Moroder | UMEK | Toolroom Records | |
| 2010 | Enhance The Tension | UMEK | 1605 | |
| 2010 | OMGWTF | UMEK | 1605 | |
| 2010 | Circles Of Hell | UMEK | 1605 | |
| 2010 | Responding To Dynamic | UMEK | 1605 | |
| 2010 | Individual Breath | UMEK | 1605 | |
| 2010 | Gatex 2010 | UMEK | 1605 | |
| 2011 | Split EP | UMEK | 1605 | |
| 2011 | Falling Up The Stairs | UMEK | 1605 | |
| 2011 | Beograd | UMEK | 1605 | |
| 2011 | Slap (Competition Remixes 2011) | UMEK | 1605 | |
| 2011 | Get Sucked | UMEK | 1605 | |
| 2011 | Fenaton 2011 | UMEK | 1605 | |
| 2011 | System Of Rules | UMEK | 1605 | |
| 2011 | Zagreb EP | UMEK | 1605 | |
| 2011 | Next Turn | UMEK | Cr2 Records | |
| 2011 | Sarajevo | UMEK | Toolroom Records | |
| 2011 | Heroes Of The Night | UMEK, Christian Cambas | 1605 | |
| 2011 | On The Edge | UMEK, Christian Cambas | 1605 | |
| 2011 | Out Of Play | UMEK, Beltek | Toolroom Records | |
| 2011 | Let The Bass Kick | UMEK, Beltek | Toolroom Records | |
| 2011 | Complementary Access | UMEK, Stefano Noferini | Great Stuff Recordings | |
| 2011 | Dead Space | UMEK, PHNTM | Toolroom Records | |
| 2011 | Extreme Beauty Records | UMEK, Martina Zymek | 1605 | |
| 2011 | Original Challenge EP | UMEK, Tomy DeClerque | CR2 Records | |
| 2011 | She Neve Wants To Come Down | UMEK, Traumer | 1605 | |
| 2012 | Kuzla Prevarantska | UMEK | 1605 | |
| 2012 | It Is Simple But It Works Like Fcuk | UMEK | 1605 | |
| 2012 | Slicing And Dicing EP | UMEK | 1605 | |
| 2012 | 100% Sure | UMEK | Deeperfect Records | |
| 2012 | Let's Go | UMEK | Deeperfect Records | |
| 2012 | Corridor To Jungle | UMEK | Agile Recordings | |
| 2012 | One More Sound | UMEK | Toolroom Records | |
| 2012 | Unclear Mechanics | UMEK | Toolroom Records | |
| 2012 | Jack The Groove | UMEK | Toolroom Records | |
| 2012 | Profile Lost (Djuma Soundsystem Remixes) | UMEK | SOUNDZ | |
| 2012 | Freak It Out | UMEK | Spinnin' Records | |
| 2012 | My House | UMEK, Mike Vale | Great Stuff Recordings | |
| 2012 | Chosen EP | UMEK, Mike Vale | Great Stuff Recordings | |
| 2012 | Point To Consider | UMEK, Mike Vale | 1605 | |
| 2012 | This Sound | Umek, Olivier Giacomotto | 1605 | |
| 2012 | Wombing EP | Umek, Olivier Giacomotto | Definitive Recordings | |
| 2012 | You Get Used To All The Madness | UMEK, Siwell | 1605 | |
| 2012 | Crossing The Lines | UMEK, Uto Karem | 1605 | |
| 2012 | Goes On | UMEK, Stefano Noferini | Deeperfect Records | |
| 2013 | Carbon Occasions (Dee Marcus 2k13 Remix) | UMEK | Pacha Recordings | |
| 2013 | Cvile Mi Jaja | UMEK | Deeperfect Records | |
| 2013 | Move Around | UMEK | Great Stuff Recordings | |
| 2013 | Utopia EP | UMEK | Renaissance Recordings Back Catalog | |
| 2013 | Love To Dance | UMEK | Toolroom Records | |
| 2013 | I Need You | UMEK | 1605 | |
| 2013 | Spank! | UMEK | Spinnin' Records | |
| 2013 | Rock It Out | UMEK, Groovebox | 1605 | |
| 2013 | Cause And Effect | UMEK, Groovebox | Toolroom Records | |
| 2013 | Mighty Wind | UMEK, DJ Dan | Toolroom Records | |
| 2013 | Fluid Feel | UMEK, Mike Vale | Toolroom Records | |
| 2013 | Unlock My Synth Vein | UMEK, Heartik | 1605 | |
| 2013 | Klaxon | UMEK, Spektre | 1605 | |
| 2013 | Korea | UMEK, Pleasurekraft | 1605 | |
| 2013 | Get Funk | UMEK, Siwell | Sphera Records | |
| 2013 | Eternity | UMEK, Uto Karem | Agile Recordings | |
| 2014 | All I Want | UMEK, Mike Vale | 1605 | |
| 2014 | Burnfire | UMEK, Jay Colin | Spinnin' Records | |
| 2014 | Sweet Harmony | UMEK, Groovebox | Spinnin' Records | |
| 2014 | Cheezin' | UMEK, Waka Flocka | Spinnin' Records | |

== Remixes ==
| Year | Title | Original artist(s) | Label | Notes |
|---|---|---|---|---|
| 1999 | "AK-47" | Space DJz | Potential | |
| 1999 | "Potential 002" | Ben Long | Potential | |
| 2000 | "Base" | DJ La Monde, Levantine | Monoïd | |
| 2000 | "Immortal" | Ade Fenton | Advanced | On the album The Remixes (Part 1) |
| 2000 | Sacred Ground | Jamie Bissmire | Ground | Album remixes |
| 2000 | Light and Shadow EP | Various | Access 58 | Album remixes |
| 2000 | "Grounded" | Cold Dust | Red Seal Records | |
| 2000 | "Meter" | Per Mikael P | G-Force Records | On album Lux |
| 2000 | "Camels" | Santos | ZYX Music, Mercury Records, House No., Ultra Records | |
| 2000 | "Wriggle" | Hitoshi Ohishi | Primevil | On album New Deal EP |
| 2000 | "Hablando" | Sueno Latino | House No. | |
| 2000 | "Sueño Latino" | Sueno Latino | Mantra Vibes | Recycled Loops Remix |
| 2000 | "House Fucker" | DJ One Finger | Missile Records | |
| 2001 | "House Fucker" | DJ One Finger | Insolent Tracks | |
| 2001 | "House Fucker" | DJ One Finger | Blq Records | Remixes |
| 2001 | "Pains" | Cristian Varela | Primate Recordings | Remixes |
| 2001 | "Havin' A good time" | Souvernace | Positiva | |
| 2001 | "Holz Remix" | Endlich Fünfzig | Holzplatten | |
| 2001 | "Dolphins" | S.O.L.I.S. | Additive Records | "Umek's Earresistable Remix" |
| 2001 | "Agent Wood" | UK Gold | Primevil | |
| 2001 | "Twilight" | Co-Fusion | Reel Musiq | On Material To Degital To Analog EP |
| 2001 | "I Feel Loved" | Depeche Mode | PIAS Recordings, Mute Records Ltd | |
| 2001 | "Base" | DJ La Monde, Levantine | Technosis | On Technosis 2 |
| 2001 | "Nighttime Activitiez" | Simon Digby & Will E Tell | Wetmusik | |
| 2001 | Conception | Asem Shama | Ghostline Electronics | |
| 2002 | "Red Fever" | Steve D | Recycled Loops | |
| 2002 | "Love Express" | Mateo Murphy | Turbo | |
| 2002 | "Hunger" | Ian Void | Geushky | |
| 2002 | "Sweet Back" | Various | Access 58 | On Collaborations & Remixes Vol. 2 |
| 2002 | "Get On Up" | DJ Rush | Pro-Jex | |
| 2002 | "Havin' A good time" | Souvernace | Hi-Bias Records | |
| 2002 | "Capture" | Marco Bailey | MB Elektronics | |
| 2002 | "Krikc" | Speedy J | NovaMute Records | On Bugmod |
| 2002 | "Musik" | Kisum | Mantra Vibes | "kemU Earresistible Rmx" |
| 2002 | "Recreate10" | The Advent | Kombination Research | On Recreations Part 2 |
| 2002 | "Third Wave" | DJ Futureshock | End Recordings | |
| 2002 | "Theme From Concept" | DJ Montana | Maelstrom Records, Black Hole Recordings | |
| 2003 | "Tanz mit Laibach" | Laibach | Mute Records | |
| 2003 | "Fade to Grey" | Transparent Sound | Electrix Records | |
| 2003 | "Patricia Never Leaves The House" | Wally López, Dr. Kucho! | Bugged Out | |
| 2003 | "Sweet Back" | Various | Access 58 | On International Underground EP Vol. 2 |
| 2004 | "Phunkeee" | Stanny Franssenn | Zenit | |
| 2004 | "Murder Was The Bass" | DK8 | ELP Medien & Verlags GmbH | On The Remixes Part II |
| 2004 | "Mirage" | Lucca | Acapulco Records | On Freedom |
| 2005 | "Swarm" | String Theory | Intec Records | "UMEK's Polyvinyl Remix" |
| 2005 | "Mirage" | Lucca, Chris Cowie | F1 Recordings | |
| 2005 | "Skin" | Silence | Matrix Musik | |
| 2006 | "The Exit" | Sylvain, DJ Shark, Neuropolitan | Jesus Loved You | |
| 2006 | "Outhouse" | Nathan Fake | Recycled Loops | |
| 2006 | "Rewiver" | Lucca | Acapulco Records | |
| 2006 | "Grounded" | Player | Infamous Player | On Infamous Player Remixes Vol. 8 |
| 2007 | "Air Conditionne" | Julian Jeweil | Skryptom Records | |
| 2008 | "Dialogue" | Deep Flexion | Coldharbour Recordings Red (Armada) | |
| 2008 | "Surface of the Moon" | Jeremiah | Ambig Records | |
| 2008 | "Las Aventuras" | David Granha | Acid Milk Recordings | |
| 2008 | "The Dig" | Ralph Falcon | Renaissance Recordings | |
| 2009 | "Exit People" | Fergie | 1605 | |
| 2009 | "Senderoff" | Fergie | Excentric Muzik | |
| 2009 | "Wiplash" | Jack de Molay, Libex | Hollister Records | |
| 2009 | "Technida" | David Scaloni | Weave Music | |
| 2009 | "Karmient" | Dyno | Hell Yeah Recordings | |
| 2009 | "Yes We Can" | Oliver Koletzki, Roland Clark | Hell Yeah Recordings | |
| 2009 | "C'est La Vie" | Joseph Capriati | Analytictrail | |
| 2009 | "Underground" | Rafael Noronha, Re Dupre, Eric Entrena | Dirty Players | |
| 2009 | "Divide" | Filth & Splendour, Kalva | Twisted Frequency Rec. | |
| 2009 | "Mirage" | Lucca | Sound of Acapulco | On Acapulco Classics (Part 1) |
| 2009 | "My Eyes" | Jimmy Van M | Proton Music | |
| 2009 | "Sonus Populi" | DiDark, Julien Hox | Dihox Records | |
| 2010 | "Mixtape" | Sébastien Léger | Mistakes Music | |
| 2010 | "Motion" | Mauro Picotto | Alchemy | On 2010 - The Remixes Part 1 |
| 2010 | "Clouds Across the Moon" | RAH Band | Great Stuff Recordings | |
| 2010 | "Casting Shadows Without Light" | Spektre | Respekt Recordings | |
| 2010 | "Break It Down" | Christian Smith | Tronic | |
| 2010 | "Fly By Wire" | Koen Groeneveld | Abzolut | |
| 2010 | "Home" | Duca | Tribal Vision Records | |
| 2010 | "The Button" | Thomas Gold | Toolroom Records | "Umek's Button To Push Remix" |
| 2011 | "Satyr Song" | Pleasurekraft | 1605 | |
| 2011 | "Shockz" | Hertz, Subway Baby | 1605 | On Remixed At 16:05 Volume 2 |
| 2011 | "Purple Pills" | D-Unity | Beat Therapy Rec | |
| 2011 | "Alright" | Tocadisco, L. A. Salomon | Superstar Rec | |
| 2011 | "Amphetamine" | Drax LTD II | AFU Limited | |
| 2012 | "Sunshine" | Tomaz, Filterheadz | 1605 | On Remixes 2012 |
| 2013 | "Metrum" | Fedde Le Grand | Toolroom Records | |
| 2013 | "The Dig" | Ralph Falcon | Renaissance Recordings Back Catalog | |
| 2013 | "All Night" | Parov Stelar | 1605 | |
| 2013 | "The Revolution" | Bontan | Kraftek | |
| 2014 | "Helium" | Chris Lake, Jareth | Ultra | "UMEK & Mike Vale Remix" |

== Compilations ==
=== 1990s ===
| Year | Title | Performer(s) | Album | Label | Notes |
|---|---|---|---|---|---|
| 1996 | "In Hale" | Thorax | Mayday - Life On Mars – The Mayday Compilation Album | Low Spirit | Mixed by Westbam |
| 1996 | "Inhale" | Thorax | Immortality - Volume 2 | Mercury Records | Compiled by Mr. Oz and DJ Yaco; mixed by DJ Yaco |
| 1997 | "Flux" | Umek | Docklands - A State Of Mind Vol. 1 | Lyrical Robot Records | |
| 1997 | "37" | Umek | Picture Disc | X-Trax | |
| 1998 | "Mechanisms B" | Mumps | In The Mix III | Noom Records | Mixed by Commander Tom |
| 1998 | "Ventilcheck" | Ratcapa | Covert Operations | Planet Rhythm Records | |
| 1998 | "Oshovina" | Ratcapa | Covert Operations | Planet Rhythm Records | |
| 1998 | "K'pr Norcih" | DJ Misjah, Umek | X-Trax Extreme | DMC Records | Mixed by DJ Misjah |
| 1998 | "K'pr Norcih" | DJ Misjah, Umek | The Best Of X-Trax The 2nd Compilation | X-Trax | |
| 1998 | "48000" | Umek | The Best Of X-Trax The 2nd Compilation | X-Trax | |
| 1998 | "Bulcoxal Loop" | Umek | Embryo Compilation | Embryo Records | |
| 1998 | "Kragital Loop" | Umek | Embryo Compilation | Embryo Records | |
| 1998 | "Illusion" | Nuca | Tunnel Red Light 5 | Red Light | Compiled by DJ Taurus |
| 1999 | "K'pr Norcih" | Umek, DJ Misjah | Acid Drops Vol. 1 | Nova Tekk, Cameleon | |
| 1999 | "Nodlocnost (AI)" | Umek | Techno Attack Volume Two | Warner Special Marketing | Mixed by Warmduscher |
| 1999 | "CLR04 B1" | Umek | DJ's Homebase II | Federation Of Drums | Mixed by Toni Rios |
| 1999 | "Six Is Nine" | Recycled Loops | DJ's Homebase II | Federation Of Drums | Mixed by Toni Rios |
| 1999 | "Six Is Nine" | Recycled Loops | Hardware DJ Series 001 | Hardware | Mixed by Eric Powell & Will E Tell |
| 1999 | "Six Is Nine" | Recycled Loops | Super Girls | TBA | Mixed by DJ Manon |
| 1999 | "Six Is Nine" | Recycled Loops | UMEK On Monoïd | Monoïd | Mixed by Umek |
| 1999 | "PVC13" | Polyvinyl | UMEK On Monoïd | Monoïd | Mixed by Umek |
| 1999 | "Lanicor" | Umek | UMEK On Monoïd | Monoïd | Mixed by Umek |
| 1999 | "Lanicor" | Umek | Illegal Techno 6 | Cyber Production | |
| 1999 | "Lanicor" | Umek | Fuse presents Dave Clarke | Music Man Records | Mixed by Dave Clarke |
| 1999 | "Radiogram" | Tiga | Delta 9 vs. Delta 9 Volume 2 | Pure Acid Mixtapes | Mixed by Delta 9 |
| 1999 | "Radiator" | Tiga | Delta 9 vs. Delta 9 Volume 2 | Pure Acid Mixtapes | Mixed by Delta 9 |
| 1999 | "PVC 14" | Polyvinyl | The Techno Life 1 | Play It Loud | Mixed by Jay Vidies |
| 1999 | "Tog" | Alba Patera | Audiophonic Volume 2 | Fine Audio Recordings | Compiled/mixed by Christian Weber |
| 1999 | "B1" | UMEK, Ben Long | Bio Molecular Rhythms Vol. 1 | Molecular Recordings | |
| 1999 | "Audio 16 A1" | UMEK, Ben Long | Audio Compilation Vol. 2 | Fine Audio Recordings | Mixed by Chris Liebing |
| 1999 | "EP 1" | Zeta Reticula | U60311 Compilation Techno Division Vol.1 | V2 Records | Compiled/mixed by Chris Liebing |
| 1999 | "Gatex" | Umek | U60311 Compilation Techno Division Vol.1 | V2 Records | Compiled/mixed by Chris Liebing |
| 1999 | "Nodlocnost" | Umek | Perlen 1 | Spiel-Zeug Schallplatten | Mixed by Thomas Schumacher |
| 1999 | "PVC 12" | Polyvinyl | This Is For You | Neuton | Compiled/mixed by Leandro Gamez |
| 1999 | "PVC 9" | Polyvinyl | This Is For You | Neuton | Compiled/mixed by Leandro Gamez |
| 1999 | "Ssest = Devet" | Logarrhythms 69, Valentino Kanzyani | Compilation For Medical Aid In Kosovo | Kobayashi Recordings | |

=== 2000-2004 ===
| Year | Title | Performer(s) | Album | Label | Notes |
|---|---|---|---|---|---|
| 2000 | "Mechanisms K" | Mumps | Illegal Techno 2000 | Cyber Production | |
| 2000 | "Mechanisms I" | Mumps | Illegal Techno 2000 | Cyber Production | |
| 2000 | "Track B2" | Mumps | Illegal Techno 2000 | Cyber Production | |
| 2000 | "Reloop 1" | Umek, Valentino Kanzyani | Aktive Matrix | Matrix Musik | |
| 2000 | "Kial 5" | Umek | Aktive Matrix | Matrix Musik | |
| 2000 | "The Right Time" | Umek | OXA House Vol. 5 | OXA | Mixed by Mas Ricardo |
| 2000 | "Audio 16" | Umek, Ben Long | Wetmusik Mix - Up - Live @ Storey Hall | Wetmusik | Mixed by Simon Digby & Will E Tell |
| 2000 | "Difolvon A2" | Umek | Wetmusik Mix - Up - Live @ Storey Hall | Wetmusik | Mixed by Simon Digby & Will E Tell |
| 2000 | "Mamomit" | Umek | Wetmusik Mix - Up - Live @ Storey Hall | Wetmusik | Mixed by Simon Digby & Will E Tell |
| 2000 | "Lanicor" | Umek | Wetmusik Mix - Up - Live @ Storey Hall | Wetmusik | Mixed by Simon Digby & Will E Tell |
| 2000 | "Lanicor" | Umek | At The Wheels Of Steel | Galvanic | Mixed by Massimo |
| 2000 | "Retoxol" | Umek | Consumer Recreation | Consumer Recreation | |
| 2000 | "Untitled From Kial 05 EP" | Umek | DJ's Homebase III | Federation Of Drums | Mixed by WJ Henze |
| 2000 | "Urtoxen" | Umek | DJ's Homebase III | Federation Of Drums | Mixed by WJ Henze |
| 2000 | "Urtoxen" | Umek | In Case Of... Plank | Harthouse | Mixed by Plank |
| 2000 | "Rock The Discotheque" | Recycled Loops | Bugged Out | Virgin Records | Mixed by Justin Robertson & Felix Da Housecat |
| 2000 | "Mechanisms H" | Mumps | Techno-Logic Vol. 1 | Universal Records | Compiled/mixed by DJ Budai |
| 2000 | "Mechanisms H" | Mumps | Geushky: This Is The Colour We Are | Geushky | Mixed by Ian Void |
| 2000 | "Mechanisms H" | Mumps | DJ Traxx 01 - Peter Pan | Klangwerk | Mixed by Peter Pan |
| 2000 | "Kilevox EP - Track A2" | Umek | DJ Traxx 01 - Peter Pan | Klangwerk | Mixed by Peter Pan |
| 2000 | "Ding" | Chris Liebing, Umek | DJ Traxx 01 - Peter Pan | Klangwerk | Mixed by Peter Pan |
| 2000 | "Ding" | Chris Liebing, Umek | Schranz + Schredder – Techno Underground | Warner Special Marketing | |
| 2000 | "Hear No Evil, Play No Evil, Dance No Evil A2" | Recyclopaedia Eclectronica | Phuture Tech Trance Volume 1 | Phoolish Records | Mixed by Oliver Lieb |
| 2000 | "A1" | Recycled Loops | Biosphere Vol. 2 | Event Records | Mixed by Brenda Russell |
| 2000 | "Six Is Nine EP" | Recycled Loops | Biosphere Vol. 2 | Event Records | Mixed by Brenda Russell |
| 2000 | "Six Is Nine EP" | Recycled Loops | Hardware #05 | Hardware | Mixed by Richard McNeill |
| 2000 | "Recyclopedia Electronica" | Recycled Loops | Hardware #05 | Hardware | Mixed by Richard McNeill |
| 2000 | "Recycled Loops 2" | Recycled Loops | Hardware #06 | Hardware | Compiled/mixed by Richard McNeill |
| 2000 | "Voltaren" | Umek | Hardware #06 | Hardware | Compiled/mixed by Richard McNeill |
| 2000 | "Mechanisms E" | Umek | Hardware #06 | Hardware | Compiled/mixed by Richard McNeill |
| 2000 | "Mechanisms E" | Mumps | Mixed Live: Crobar Nightclub, Chicago | Moonshine Music | Live mix by Carl Cox |
| 2000 | "Mechanisms E-H" | Mumps | Global Underground 018: Amsterdam | Boxed | Mixed by Nick Warren |
| 2000 | "Mechanisms E-H" | Mumps | Voice And Beats - MC Spot | XXX Records | Mixed by Elex Red; vocals by MC Spot |
| 2000 | "Cmeda" | Umek | Sammlung 1 | Spiel-Zeug Schallplatten | |
| 2000 | "Voices of Africa" | Umek | Past Lessons / Future Theories | Distinct'ive Breaks Records | Mixed by Slam |
| 2000 | "Kilevox E. P." | Umek | Bio Molecular Rhythms Vol. 2 | Molecular Recordings | |
| 2000 | "Bronildera" | Umek | A 100% Techno Therapy | Model Records | Mixed by DJ Tonio |
| 2000 | "Bronildera" | Umek | Plastic Meltdown Two | Luxus | Compiled by Olaf Pozsgay; mixed by F.L.X. |
| 2000 | "Recycled Loops 002 A1" | Recyclopedia Eclectronica | Montreal Mix Sessions Vol. 5 - Mixed Emotions | Turbo | Mixed by Tiga |
| 2000 | "Ep 1 B2" | Zeta Reticula | Montreal Mix Sessions Vol. 5 - Mixed Emotions | Turbo | Mixed by Tiga |
| 2000 | "A1" | Zeta Reticula | Elektrotehnika Slavenika | The Wire | |
| 2000 | "Voice 1" | Umek | X-Club - 5th Anniversary | Zona Musica | |
| 2000 | "Recyclopaedia" | Recycled Loops | X-Club - 5th Anniversary | Zona Musica | |
| 2000 | "Mechanisms E" | Mumps | In the Mix Volume 6 | Experience Grooves | Mixed by Steve Mason |
| 2000 | "Mechanisms E" | Mumps | The Torture Chamber | Tortured Records | Mixed by Billy Nasty |
| 2000 | "Mechanisms H" | Mumps | The Torture Chamber | Tortured Records | Mixed by Billy Nasty |
| 2000 | "Audio 016 B1" | Umek, Ben Long | Sound of Eukatech 3 | Eukatech | Mixed by Richard Summerhayes |
| 2001 | "Soludeks" | Umek | DJ Marta | Legend Records | Mixed by DJ Marta |
| 2001 | "Soludeks" | Umek | Trance Techno T.R.A.X. 3 | Tempo Music | Mixed by Frank T.R.A.X. |
| 2001 | "Nodlocnost" | Umek | Sammlung 2 | Spiel-Zeug Schallplatten | |
| 2001 | "Glurenorm" | Umek | Sammlung 2 | Spiel-Zeug Schallplatten | |
| 2001 | "Untitled" | Umek | Kial 06 | Kial | |
| 2001 | "Cartex" | Umek | Imprint | Distinct'ive Records | |
| 2001 | "Recycled Loops" | Umek | Imprint | Distinct'ive Records | |
| 2001 | "Dotax" | Umek | Imprint | Distinct'ive Records | |
| 2001 | "EP 1" | Zeta Reticula | Electrocuted Presents Sexmachinemusic | Groovetech Records | |
| 2001 | "B2" | Recycled Loops | 4 Elements - An Essential Dance Gathering | Influx | Mixed by Kelly D |
| 2001 | "B2" | Recycled Loops | World Service | React Music | Mixed by Dave Clarke |
| 2001 | "Ceroxol" | Umek | World Service | React Music | Mixed by Dave Clarke |
| 2001 | "EP 2" | Zeta Reticula | World Service | React Music | Mixed by Dave Clarke |
| 2001 | "EP 2" | Zeta Reticula | Tronic Treatment | Tronic, Hardware, Moonshine Music | Compiled/mixed by Christian Smith |
| 2001 | "Ratexo" | Umek | The Second Porn Cut | Pornographic Records | |
| 2001 | "Ratexo" | Umek | Essential Underground Vol. 03: Berlin / Detroit | DJ-sets.com | Mixed by Claude Young & DJ Rok |
| 2001 | "Gatex" | Umek | Essential Underground Vol. 03: Berlin / Detroit | DJ-sets.com | Mixed by Claude Young & DJ Rok |
| 2001 | "Gatex" | Umek | Cocoon 2001 | Ministry Magazine | Mixed by Sven Vath |
| 2001 | "Gatex" | Umek | Sound Design | Jive Electro | Mixed by Kazu Kimura and Simon Coyle |
| 2001 | "Gatex" | Umek | Monster Mix CD | Proton Music | Mixed by Dr Motte |
| 2001 | "Gatex" | Umek | Terra Firma | Geushky | Compiled/mixed by Ian Void |
| 2001 | "Gatex" | Umek | ID&T Techno | ID&T | Mixed by Arjan Rietvink Productions |
| 2001 | "Ding" | Chris Liebing, Umek | Techno Culture Primate Recordings | Tempo Music | Mixed by Melrob |
| 2001 | "Voice 2" | Umek | Techno Culture Primate Recordings | Tempo Music | Mixed by Melrob |
| 2001 | "Mamomit" | Umek | Caught In The Act | Logistic Records | Mixed by John Thomas |
| 2001 | "Voice Of Africa (Voice 2)" | Umek | On the Road | Terminal M | Mixed by Miss Kittin |
| 2001 | "Lanicor" | Umek | The Last DJ'z On Earth | Primal Rhythms | Mixed by Ben Long and Jamie Bissmire |
| 2001 | "Voice of Africa" | Umek | The Last DJ'z On Earth | Primal Rhythms | Mixed by Ben Long and Jamie Bissmire |
| 2001 | "Voltaren" | Umek | Time Warp Presents Compilation 2 | Time Warp | Mixed by Gayle San |
| 2001 | "Voltaren" | Umek | Relentless Beats Vol. 1 | Moonshine Music | Mixed by Misstress Barbara |
| 2001 | "Cavist" | Umek | Essential Underground Vol. 02: Berlin / Chicago | DJ-sets.com | Mixed by DJ Rush & Marco Remus |
| 2001 | "Voice #4" | Umek | Techno Energy 12 | Nextera | Mixed by Traxster |
| 2001 | "Mechanisms E" | Umek | PLUS: Technasia: Charles Siegling | Plus | Mixed by Charles Siegling |
| 2001 | "Voice of Africa Vol. 1" | Umek | Fine Audio DJ Mix Series Vol. 5: Michael Burkat | Fine Audio Recordings | Mixed by Michael Burkat |
| 2001 | "Tetrakain" | Umek | Music Lunch | Record Express | Compiled & mixed by Dān Von Schulz |
| 2001 | "Tetrakain" | Umek | Rock the Discothèque | Matrix Musik | Mixed by Valentino Kanzyani |
| 2001 | "Cartex" | Umek | Rock the Discothèque | Matrix Musik | Mixed by Valentino Kanzyani |
| 2001 | "Felinon" | Umek | Rock the Discothèque | Matrix Musik | Mixed by Valentino Kanzyani |
| 2001 | "Voice 1" | Umek | Rock the Discothèque | Matrix Musik | Mixed by Valentino Kanzyani |
| 2001 | "Rock The Discotechque" | UMEK, Valentino Kanzyani | Rock the Discothèque | Matrix Musik | Mixed by Valentino Kanzyani |
| 2001 | "Mechanisms E" | Mumps | Rock the Discothèque | Matrix Musik | Mixed by Valentino Kanzyani |
| 2001 | "Mechanisms G" | Mumps | Rock the Discothèque | Matrix Musik | Mixed by Valentino Kanzyani |
| 2001 | "Ker" | Alba Patera | Bïonom - Monoïd 2nd Label Compilation | Monoïd | Mixed by DJ La Monde |
| 2001 | "Cag" | Alba Patera | Bïonom - Monoïd 2nd Label Compilation | Monoïd | Mixed by DJ La Monde |
| 2001 | "Brotax" | Umek | Maximal.FM Compilation Vol. 2 | Media Records, BXR Benelux | Mixed by Mauro Picotto |
| 2001 | "Gatex" | Umek | Maximal.FM Compilation Vol. 2 | Media Records, BXR Benelux | Mixed by Mauro Picotto |
| 2001 | "Voice of Africa (Voice 1)" | Umek | Nu Teqdenz | Black Hole Recordings | Compiled/mixed by DJ Eric Denz Da Denz |
| 2001 | "Potential 11 B2" | Umek | The Sound Of Eukatech 5 | Eukatech | Mixed by Nils Hess |
| 2001 | "Earresistible" | Recyclopedia Eclectronica | Promiss - II: Wake Up Call | Basic Beat Recordings | Compiled/mixed by DJ Promiss |
| 2001 | "Earresistible Once" | Recycled Loops | Wetmusik Presents Prime Time | Wetmusik | |
| 2001 | Body Re:Fuel" | Recycled Loops | DA01 | Trust The DJ | Mixed by Dave Angel |
| 2001 | Body Re:Fuel" | Recycled Loops | Concept Techno 2.0 | Hardware | |
| 2001 | Body Re:Fuel" | UMEK | En Linje - Calle Dernulf Samlar Techno | EMI Records | Compiled by DJ Calle Dernulf |
| 2001 | "Sset = Devet" | Logarhythms 69 | Kobayashi 010 Limited | Kobayashi Recordings | |
| 2001 | "Mechanisms E-H (A1)" | Mumps | Vital Sessions | Human | Mixed by Oxia |
| 2001 | "Akcija" | Kemu | Cream CD3 | Yul Records | Mixed by DJ Maüs |
| 2001 | "Park Shiner" | Kemu | Cafe D'Anvers Presents Free Vibes & Saturdays | Discomatic | Mixed by Baby Bee, DJ Prinz & Smos |
| 2001 | "Ding" | Chris Liebing, Umek | Hard Techno | SPV Poland/Big Blue | Mixed by Melrob |
| 2001 | "Voice 2" | Umek | Hard Techno | SPV Poland/Big Blue | Mixed by Melrob |
| 2001 | "Protax" | Umek | Selected & Connected Tracks by W. Jörg Henze | Spiel-Zeug Schallplatten | Mixed by W. Jörg Henze |
| 2001 | "Deri" | UMEK, DJ Misjah | DJ's En Directo Vol. 2 | Contrasena Records | Mixed by David Cabeza, Miguel Serna & Nacho Division |
| 2001 | "Voice 3" | Umek | Advance | Max Music & Entertainment Inc. | Mixed by Stryke |
| 2001 | "Urtoxen" | Umek | Vinyl Surgery - Frequenz Berater | d.Drum | Compiled by Carson Plug |
| 2001 | "A1" | Zeta Reticula | Tehnika 1 | Tehnika | |
| 2001 | "EP 2 Track B2" | Zeta Reticula | Darkhouz & Popotronic | Satellite K | Mixed by Sidereal |
| 2001 | "Untitled" | Zeta Reticula | Club Bunker | Sygno Music | Mixed by DJ Ricardinho NS |
| 2002 | "Gatex" | Umek | CreamCollect Techno | Virgin Records | |
| 2002 | "Gatex" | Umek | Food Main Course | Antler-Subway Records | Mixed by Raoul Belmans and Trish van Eynde |
| 2002 | "Katol" | Umek | Food Main Course | Antler-Subway Records | Mixed by Raoul Belmans and Trish van Eynde |
| 2002 | "Suna Talat Vol 1 Klopa" | Umek | Wetmusik Mix-Up Volume 5 - Live @ Pureflow | Wetmusik | Mixed by Simon Coyle |
| 2002 | "Untitled" | Umek | Volume One On One | Torta | |
| 2002 | "Benozal" | Umek | Vitamina H - Zona X | S.A.I.F.A.M. | Mixed by Lady Helena & Tony |
| 2002 | "Benozal" | Umek | Electronic Essence #01 | Tronic Soundz | Mixed by Christian Weber |
| 2002 | "Benozal" | Umek | First Take | Legend Records | Mixed by Karol Berkley |
| 2002 | "Ceroxol" | Umek | Technodrome Volume 12 | Polystar Records | Mixed by DJ Mellow D |
| 2002 | "Gatex (Oliver Lieb Remix)" | Umek | Solid Sounds Anno 2002 Vol. 04 | 541 | |
| 2002 | "Gatex (Oliver Lieb Remix)" | Umek | Club System 26 | EVA Belgium | Mixed by Sven Lanvin |
| 2002 | "Chuckercheck" | Umek | Subliminal Sessions Two | Subliminal Records | Mixed by Harry "Choo Choo" Romero |
| 2002 | "Chuckercheck" | Umek | Sekaaa! | Menart Records | |
| 2002 | "Oranzol" | Umek | Sekaaa! | Menart Records | |
| 2002 | "Consumer Recreation E. P." | Umek | Sekaaa! | Menart Records | |
| 2002 | "Beroxan" | Umek | Sekaaa! | Menart Records | |
| 2002 | "Manaxan" | Umek | Sekaaa! | Menart Records | |
| 2002 | "Manaxan" | Umek | Hyperspace 05 | Underground Records Hungary | Mixed by Hot X & Igor Do'urden |
| 2002 | "Gatex (DJ Montana Remix)" | Umek | Impulz - A Different World – The Compilation | UDC | Compiled & mixed by Don Diablo |
| 2002 | "Exutol" | Umek | Schranzwerk 5 | ZYX Music | |
| 2002 | "Exutol" | Umek | Clubbed 2002 | Universal Music | Mixed by Judge Jules |
| 2002 | "Jakatron A1" | Umek | Gazometertraxxx Vol. 17 - Earth | XXX Records | Mixed by Marco Bailey |
| 2002 | "Earrisitible Once" | Recycled Loops | Rare Species | Logistic Records | Mixed by Robert Hood |
| 2002 | "Six Is Nine" | Recycled Loops | Endangered Mixes Volume 2 | Primate Endangered Species | Mixed by Extek |
| 2002 | "Suna Talat Vol. 2" | Los Tujlios | Space Ibiza 2002 Dance | Neo Records Ltd. | Mixed by DJ Reche & Jonathan Ulysses |
| 2002 | "Solomilio" | Los Tujlios | In America | DMC Publishing | Mixed by Slam |
| 2002 | "Eurotronic" | Kemu | Selección Básica | Tanga Records | Mixed by Angel Moraes & David Gausa |
| 2002 | "Voice 2" | Umek | Street Move 2002 | Liquid Space | Mixed by Alibee, Dr. Mohrle & Vinzenz |
| 2002 | "Taxil" | Umek | More Favorite Tools | XXX Records | Mixed by Tom Wax |
| 2002 | "Voice 4" | Umek | Endangered Mixes Volume One | UCMG Germany | Mixed by Traxster |
| 2002 | "Audio 16" | UMEK, Ben Long | Five Years Of Fine Audio | Fine Audio Recordings | Mixed by Christian Weber |
| 2002 | "Mechanisms M" | Mumps | BN01 | Trust The DJ | Mixed by Billy Nasty |
| 2002 | "Kenox" | Umek | BN01 | Trust The DJ | Mixed by Billy Nasty |
| 2002 | "Gatex (DJ Le Blanc Remix)" | Umek | Outstanding | Black Hole Recordings | Compiled/mixed by DJ Cor Fijneman |
| 2002 | "Cotax" | Umek | 2002 (CD One) | Underground Records Hungary | Compiled/mixed by DJ Budai |
| 2002 | "Tetrakain" | Umek | 2002 (CD One) | Underground Records Hungary | Compiled/mixed by DJ Budai |
| 2002 | "Earisisable" | Recycled Loops | 2002 (CD One) | Underground Records Hungary | Compiled/mixed by DJ Budai |
| 2002 | "Fenaton" | Umek | Roundtrip | Kinetic Records | Mixed by DJ Dan |
| 2002 | "Mechanism M-P" | Mumps | Roundtrip | Kinetic Records | Mixed by DJ Dan |
| 2002 | "Exercizer" | Recycled Loops | Roundtrip | Kinetic Records | Mixed by DJ Dan |
| 2002 | "Gatex (Umek Remix)" | Umek | I Love Techno 2002 | 541 | Mixed by Tomaz |
| 2002 | "Namilax" | Umek | Technodrome Volume 13 | Polystar Records | Mixed by DJ Mellow D |
| 2002 | "Vanilla Flavour" | Kemu | Essential Underground Vol. 4: Berlin/Bruxelles | DJ-sets.com | Mixed by Marco Bailey and Miss Yetti |
| 2002 | "Voices of Africa" | Umek | Essential Underground Vol. 4: Berlin/Bruxelles | DJ-sets.com | Mixed by Marco Bailey and Miss Yetti |
| 2002 | "Voices of Africa" | Umek | Techno | Zона Отрыва | Mixed by DJ Arsenly |
| 2002 | "Voltaren" | Umek | Salon De Mezclas | Serial Killer Vinyl | Mixed by Cristian Varela & Tony Verdi |
| 2003 | "Jakaton" | UMEK | U60311 Compilation Techno Division Vol. 3 | V2 Records | Mixed by Carl Cox |
| 2003 | "Tikonal" | UMEK | 2 CDs & MP3s | NovaMute Records | |
| 2003 | "Zalonex" | UMEK | 2 CDs & MP3s | NovaMute Records | |
| 2003 | "Voices Of Africa Volume 2 (Voice 4)" | UMEK | Destination - Australia 02 | EQ Recordings | Mixed by Meat Katie |
| 2003 | "Tool 1" | Zeta Reticula | Balance 005 | EQ Recordings | Mixed by James Holden |
| 2003 | "Tool 3" | Zeta Reticula | Balance 005 | EQ Recordings | Mixed by James Holden |
| 2003 | "Audio 16 A1" | Ben Long, Umek | Labelcompilation 1 & 2 | Fine Audio Recordings | Mixed by Chris Liebing |
| 2003 | "Audio 16 B1" | Ben Long, Umek | Labelcompilation 1 & 2 | Fine Audio Recordings | Mixed by Chris Liebing |
| 2003 | "Gatex (Tiësto Remix)" | UMEK | Transcendence | Indepandence Records | |
| 2003 | "Gatex (Tiësto Remix)" | UMEK | Cherry Moon 12 Years Anniversary | Byte Progressive | Compiled by DJ Ghost & Youri |
| 2003 | "Gatex (Tiësto Remix)" | UMEK | Music For A Harder Generation | Tidy Trax | Mixed by Anne Savage |
| 2003 | "Gatex (Umek Remix)" | UMEK | Rave Olympia | DJ Beat Records | Mixed by Angy Dee |
| 2003 | "Voltaren" | UMEK | Rhythm1 | Zouk Music | Mixed by Aldrin & Jeremy Boon |
| 2003 | "Gatex" | UMEK | Godskitchen Direct | GK Recordings | |
| 2003 | "Gatex" | UMEK | From Saturday To Sunday Vol. 4 | Clubstar | Mixed by John Acquaviva |
| 2003 | "Gatex" | UMEK | Electronic Hits 2003 | Independence Records | |
| 2003 | "Voices Of Africa (Voice 1) | UMEK | Electronic Hits 2003 | Independence Records | |
| 2003 | "Gatex (DJ Montana Remix)" | UMEK | Vitamina H - Fuga Da Accatrax | S.A.I.F.A.M. | Mixed by Lady Helena & Tony H |
| 2003 | "Gatex (DJ Montana Remix)" | UMEK | Trance Energy 2003 - The 10th Anniversary Edition | ID&T | Mixed by Johan Gielen |
| 2003 | "Ranzal" | UMEK | Mix 03: ID&T Presents DJ Promo | ID&T | Mixed by DJ Promo |
| 2003 | "Lancior" | UMEK | Schranz Fusion | Edel Records | Mixed by DJ Sulo |
| 2003 | "Chuckercheck" | UMEK | Technoise | Record Express | Compiled/mixed by DJ Newl |
| 2003 | "Matrix" | Recycled Loops | I Love Techno 2003 | PIAS Recordings, 541 | Mixed by Stanny Franssen |
| 2003 | "Memento" | Recycled Loops | Sound Of Hradhouse Mix | XMAG | Mixed by DJ Lucca |
| 2003 | "Memento Remake" | Recycled Loops | Summer Of Love Mix | XMAG | Mixed by DJ Ladida |
| 2004 | "Jakaton" | UMEK | Live - Funky Techno Roadmovie | Universal Music (Hungary) | Compiled/mixed by DJ Budai |
| 2004 | "Kanzlerlat" | UMEK | Ghost in the Shell Tribute Album | Miya Records, JVC Victor | |
| 2004 | "Mamomit" | UMEK | More Favorite Tools | XXX Records | Mixed by Cristian Varela |
| 2004 | "Prozax (Trust No One EP)" | UMEK | Lagoa 15 | 541 | Mixed by Manu Kenton |
| 2004 | "Gatex" | UMEK | Sensation - The Megamixes | Universal TV | |
| 2004 | "Holz Rmx" | UMEK | Holzplatten Zehn | ZYX Music | Compiled/mixed by Brixton |
| 2004 | "Cantonol" | UMEK | Jump 2004 Part 3 | Jumper Records | Mixed by DJ Massiv & Steve Dexter |
| 2004 | "Soludeks" | UMEK | United DJs Vol. 2 | Matrix Musik | Mixed by Ivan Komlinovic and Veztax |
| 2004 | "Tonatol" | UMEK | United DJs Vol. 2 | Matrix Musik | Mixed by Ivan Komlinovic and Veztax |
| 2004 | "Voice 7" | UMEK | United DJs Vol. 2 | Matrix Musik | Mixed by Ivan Komlinovic and Veztax |
| 2004 | "Voice 7" | UMEK | Endangered Mixes Volume 3 - A Continuous Primate Experience | Primate Endangered Species | Mixed by Traxster |
| 2004 | "Voice 1" | UMEK | Endangered Mixes Volume 3 - A Continuous Primate Experience | Primate Endangered Species | Mixed by Traxster |
| 2004 | "Entan" | UMEK | Palazzo Volume Two | T:Classixx | Mixed by Gayle San |
| 2004 | "Cavist" | UMEK | Sammlung 03 | Spiel-Zeug Schallplatten | |
| 2004 | "Bronildera" | UMEK | Sammlung 03 | Spiel-Zeug Schallplatten | |
| 2004 | "Clear Message" | Kemu & Shark | Subliminal Sessions 6 | Universal TV | Mixed by Benny Benassi |
| 2004 | "Gatex" | UMEK | Technoclash Of Civilisation? | XMAG | Mixed by Ales Bleha |
| 2004 | "Brotax" | UMEK | Technoclash Of Civilisation? | XMAG | Mixed by Ales Bleha |
| 2004 | "Lanicor" | UMEK | DJ Worx Manu Kenton | 541 | Mixed by Manu Kenton |
| 2004 | "Mechanisms E-H (A1)" | Mumps | An Electro Mix - Box | UWe | Mixed by The Hacker & Oxia |
| 2004 | "Mechanism Q" | Mumps | Ekspozicija Dve: Sindustry | Explicit Musick | Mixed by Marco Bailey |
| 2004 | "Mechanism Q" | Mumps | Essential Underground vol. 09: Stockholm | DJ-sets.com | Mixed by Adam Beyer |

=== 2005-2009 ===
| Year | Title | Performer(s) | Album | Label | Notes |
|---|---|---|---|---|---|
| 2005 | "Ludko Nastic" | Umek | U60311 Compilation Techno Division Vol. 5 | V2 Records | Mixed by Gayle San |
| 2005 | "Gatex (Tiësto Remix)" | Umek | Sensation 2005 - The Megamixes | Universal TV | |
| 2005 | "Cantonol" | Umek | Audio Community 1 | Fine Audio Recordings | Mixed by MP-Nuts, Patrik Skoog |
| 2005 | "Version 1" | Umek | Carl Cox @ Space | Intec Records | Mixed by Carl Cox |
| 2005 | "Gatex (Original)" | Umek | 10 years I Love Techno The Classics | 541, PIAS Recordings | |
| 2005 | "Overtake & Command" | Umek | Judgement Euphoria | Ministry Of Sound | Mixed by Eddie Halliwell, Judge Jules, Trophy Twins |
| 2005 | "The Ruler Allows Mischief" | Polyvinyl | Again On Monoïd | Monoïd | Mixed by Samuel L. Session |
| 2005 | "Stereophase" | Polyvinyl | United DJs Vol. 3 | Matrix Musik | Mixed by Joel Mull and DJ Lucca |
| 2005 | "Tomorrow World" | Polyvinyl | United DJs Vol. 3 | Matrix Musik | Mixed by Joel Mull and DJ Lucca |
| 2005 | "Tomorrow World" | Polyvinyl | Relic Mix Compilation | Relic Music | Mixed by DJ Preach |
| 2006 | "Mechanism-E" | Mumps | Monegros Desert Festival 12 | Florida Records | Mixed by AndresAndreas |
| 2006 | "Mechanisms Q" | Mumps | Pah | Carizma | Mixed by Kagami |
| 2006 | "Another Matter Entirely" | Umek | I Love Techno 2006 | 541, PIAS Recordings | Mixed by Ortin Cam |
| 2006 | "Scathead" | Umek | Hradhouse 06 | Report Media S.R.O. | Mixed by Lucca and Michel De Hey |
| 2006 | "Scathead" | Umek | Global | Resist Music | Mixed by Carl Cox |
| 2006 | "Posing As Me" | Umek | Judgement Sundays - The True Sound Of Ibiza | Ministry Of Sound | Mixed by Judge Jules |
| 2006 | "Posing As Me" | Umek | Acquaholic: The True Electro Experience | Great Stuff Recordings | Mixed by John Acquaviva |
| 2007 | "Complikator" | UMEK | La Terrrazza - Atmospherical Fun Club | Circle Music | |
| 2007 | "Vandal Derivate" | UMEK | Various Punks Volume A | Datapunk | |
| 2007 | "Vandal Derivate" | UMEK | We Are Punks 2 | Datapunk | |
| 2007 | "Carbon Occasions" | UMEK | Balance 10.1. | EQ Recordings | Mixed by Jimmy Van M |
| 2007 | "Carbon Occasions" | UMEK | This Is Sander Kleinenberg | Ultra Records, Diamond Records, Renaissance Recordings | Mixed by Sander Kleinenberg |
| 2007 | "Carbon Occasions" | UMEK | London '07 (Live From The Gallery) | Avex Taiwan, Armada Music | Mixed by M.I.K.E. |
| 2007 | "Carbon Occasions" | UMEK | Sound of Acapulco Spring 2007 | Acapulco Records | Mixed by DJ Luca |
| 2007 | "Anxious On Demand" | Umek, iTurk | Private Fiction 6 | Universal Music | Compiled/mixed by PF-Allstars |
| 2007 | "Faithful Nights" | UMEK | Cream Ibiza 2007 | New State Recordings | Mixed by Eddie Halliwell |
| 2007 | "Ricochet Effect" | UMEK | Transitions Vol. 3 | Thrive Records, High Note Records, Renaissance Recordings | Mixed by John Digweed |
| 2008 | "Army Of Two" | UMEK, Beltek | Armada Progressive Trance Tunes Volume 9 | Armada Music | |
| 2008 | "Army Of Two" | UMEK, Beltek | Trance 2008 – The Best Tunes In The Mix (Trance Yearmix Part 1) | Armada Music | |
| 2008 | "Army Of Two" | UMEK, Beltek | Armada At Ibiza 2008 | Armada Music | |
| 2008 | "Army Of Two" | UMEK, Beltek | Armada's Amsterdam Dance Event Tunes (2008) | Armada Music | |
| 2008 | "Army Of Two" | UMEK, Beltek | Tranceposition Vol. 1 | Armada Music | Mixed by Arnej |
| 2008 | "Army Of Two (Jay Lumen Main Stage Remix)" | UMEK, Beltek | Pilot6 Recordings The Best Of 2008 | Armada Music | |
| 2008 | "Army Of Two (Jay Lumen Main Stage Remix)" | UMEK, Beltek | Club Elite Sessions Vol. 1 | Armada Music | |
| 2008 | "Army Of Two (Jay Lumen Main Stage Remix)" | UMEK, Beltek | 20 Underground Music Tunes Volume 5 | Armada Music | |
| 2008 | "Army Of Two (Jay Lumen Main Stage Remix)" | UMEK, Beltek | Mile High Sessions Volume 1 | Armada Music | Mixed by Shawn Mitiska |
| 2008 | "Army Of Two (Jay Lumen Main Stage Remix)" | UMEK, Beltek | Armada Trance Vol. 4 | Armada Music | |
| 2008 | "The Santien Race" | UMEK, Matthew Hoag | Nu Visions | Armada Music | Mixed by Nick K |
| 2008 | "Twisted Route" | UMEK | Soundz Vol. 1 | Soundz | |
| 2008 | "Ceramic Or Human" | UMEK | Mechanic Side Of Nature | Circle/Daredo Music | Mixed by Alex Flatner |
| 2008 | "Gatex" | UMEK | A State Of Trance Classics Vol. 3 | Cloud 9 Music BV | |
| 2008 | "Gatex" | UMEK | Black Hole Recordings 10 Year Anniversary CD | Black Hole Recordings | Mixed by DJ Mark Green |
| 2008 | "Carbon Occasions (John Jacobsen Remix)" | UMEK | NYC Underground Party Vol. 8 | Ultra Records | Mixed by Louie DeVito |
| 2008 | "Posing Like Me" | UMEK | Slices Music Video Collection | Electronic Beats | |
| 2008 | "Faithful Nights" | UMEK | Renaissance: The Masters Series Part 10 | Renaissance Recordings | Mixed by Dave Seaman |
| 2008 | "Carbon Occasions" | Umek, Andja | Live At Pacha Club Egypt Sharm El Sheikh | DKD D-Noy Muzik | Mixed by Dan Desnoyers |
| 2009 | "Destructible Environment (Loco & Jam Remix)" | UMEK | Remixed At 16:05 | 1605 | |
| 2009 | "Gatex (Fergie Remix)" | UMEK | Remixed At 16:05 | 1605 | |
| 2009 | "Pravim Haos" | UMEK | Cr2 Presents Live & Direct Space Ibiza - Around The World | Cr2 Records | On the Beatport Exclusive Version as well |
| 2009 | "Pravim Haos" | UMEK | Hafentunnel 2009 | BigCityBeats | |
| 2009 | "You Might Hear Nothing" | UMEK | Umek? Hell Yeah (Disc 1) | Hell Yeah Recordings | Compiled/mixed by Umek |
| 2009 | "16th Century Japan" | UMEK | Umek? Hell Yeah (Disc 1) | Hell Yeah Recordings | Compiled/mixed by Umek |
| 2009 | "S Cream (Taster Peter Raves The Planet Remix)" | UMEK | Fat Of Excellence | Hell Yeah Recordings | |
| 2009 | "Spare - Good For Me (Dyno Remix)" | UMEK | And All Milano Says... | Hell Yeah Recordings | |
| 2009 | "Is It? (Wippenberg Mix)" | UMEK, Beltek | Armada Best Of House 2009 | Armada Music | |
| 2009 | "Is It? (Wippenberg Mix)" | UMEK, Beltek | Best Of Progressive 2009 | Armada Music | |
| 2009 | "Is It? (Wippenberg Mix)" | UMEK, Beltek | A State Of Trance 400 | Armada Music | |
| 2009 | "Is It? (Wippenberg Mix)" | UMEK, Beltek | Toronto 09 | Armada Music | |
| 2009 | "Is It?" | UMEK, Beltek | Best Of Pilot 6 2009 | Armada Music | |
| 2009 | "Is It?" | UMEK, Beltek | The Armada DJ Extended Versions Collection 2009 | Armada Music | |
| 2009 | "Is It?" | UMEK, Beltek | Maximum House Vol. 7 | Armada Music | |
| 2009 | "Is It?" | UMEK, Beltek | 20 Progressive House Tunes Vol. 2 | Armada Music | |
| 2009 | "Is It?" | UMEK, Beltek | House Beats Volume 2 | Armada Music | |
| 2009 | "Is It?" | UMEK, Beltek | Armada - The Miami Essentials 2009 | Armada Music | |
| 2009 | "Option To Stimulate" | UMEK, Beltek | I Love Progressive Volume 5 | Armada Music | |
| 2009 | "Profile Lost" | UMEK | Soundzystem Vol. 1 | Soundz | Mixed by Håkan Lidbo |
| 2009 | "Twisted Route" | UMEK | Soundzsystem Vol. 2 | Soundz | Mixed by Tony Senghore |
| 2009 | "Spare (good for Me)" | UMEK | From Disco To Techno | Mantra Vibes | |
| 2009 | "S-cream (Taster Peter Remix)" | UMEK | From Disco To Techno | Mantra Vibes | |
| 2009 | "Utopia (Tigerskin Remix)" | UMEK | Focus On | Renaissance Recordings | Mixed by Neil Quigley |
| 2009 | "Army Of Two (Radio Edit)" | UMEK, Beltek | Summer Of Dance 2009 | Cloud 9 Dance | |
| 2009 | "Carbon Occasions (Extended Vocal)" | UMEK, Andja | Pacha Ibiza Vip Vol. 3 | Pacha Recordings | |
| 2009 | "Combine Fragments (Dachshund Remix)" | UMEK | Best Of Circle | Circle Music | |
| 2009 | "Sourcewaves 1605" | UMEK | United DJs For Abruzzo | Footloversmusic | |
| 2009 | "Take A Look" | UMEK | Highway Chapter 3 | World Club Music | |

=== 2010-2014 ===
| Year | Title | Performer(s) | Album | Label | Notes |
|---|---|---|---|---|---|
| 2010 | "Chase The Moroder" | Umek | Toolroom Records Vs. Leaders Of The New School – Best Of 2010 | Toolroom Records | |
| 2010 | "Chase The Moroder" | Umek | Toolroom Records Ibiza 2010 – Vol. 2 | Toolroom Records | |
| 2010 | "Combine Fragments (Dachshund Remix)" | UMEK | Screaming Electro House Vol. 1 | Tronic Soundz | |
| 2010 | "Card Gamble (F. Sonic & Andrew Technique Remix)" | UMEK | Hotfingers Must-Haves | hotfingers | |
| 2010 | "Back In The Race" | UMEK, Beltek | Winter Mix 2010 | Cr2 Records | |
| 2010 | "Back In The Race" | UMEK, Beltek | Best Of 2010 | Cr2 Records | |
| 2010 | "Madame Web" | UMEK, Beltek | Best Of 2010 | Cr2 Records | |
| 2010 | "Madame Web" | UMEK, Beltek | Dirty Dutch Fallout | Dirty Dutch | Mixed by Chuckie |
| 2010 | "Madame Web" | UMEK, Beltek | Basslines Vol. 2 – Deluxe Edition | Cr2 Records | |
| 2010 | "We Are Not Done Yet" | UMEK, Beltek | Love Is In The Air | 303Lovers | |
| 2010 | "Slap" | UMEK | 1605 Prvo Poglavje | 1605 | |
| 2010 | "Control Points" | UMEK | 1605 Prvo Poglavje | 1605 | |
| 2010 | "Blinking Indicator" | UMEK, Sinisa Lukic | 1605 Prvo Poglavje | 1605 | |
| 2010 | "Destructible Environment" | UMEK | 1605 Prvo Poglavje | 1605 | |
| 2010 | "Destructible Environment" | UMEK | Alex D'Elia & Nihil Young Present: Ready 2 Rock Vol. 1 | Ready 2 Rock | |
| 2010 | "2nd to None (Mr Henry Von Remix)" | UMEK | Alex D'Elia & Nihil Young Present: Ready 2 Rock Vol. 1 | Ready 2 Rock | |
| 2010 | "Dementia (Dyno & Alex Di Stefano Remix)" | UMEK | From Techno To Paradise | Mantra Vibes | |
| 2010 | "Dementia" | UMEK | From Techno To Paradise | Mantra Vibes | |
| 2010 | "Carbon Occasions" | UMEK, Andja | Pacha Ibiza VIP Vol. 4 | Pacha Recordings | |
| 2010 | "Carbon Occasions (Al Velilla Remix)" | UMEK, Andja | The Ibiza Years – Al Velilla | Pacha Recordings | |
| 2010 | "Enhance The Tension" | UMEK | Wake Me Up At 16:05 | 1605 | |
| 2010 | "Work This Data" | UMEK | Dataworx Code Series 02 | Dataworx Digital | |
| 2010 | "Ricochet Effect" | UMEK | 5 Years Of Manual Music Part 3/3 - Unmixed | Manual Music | |
| 2010 | "Akul" | UMEK | Audiomatique History Part 1 | Audiomatique Recordings | |
| 2010 | "Complikator" | UMEK | Audiomatique History Part 1 | Audiomatique Recordings | |
| 2010 | "Longer Trail" | UMEK, Beltek | Armada 15 House Extended Versions | Armada Music | |
| 2010 | "Longer Trail" | UMEK, Beltek | House Beats Volume 4 | Armada Music | |
| 2010 | "Army Of Two (Jay Lumen Main Stage Remix)" | UMEK, Beltek | Ibiza Progressive Tunes 2010 | Armada Music | |
| 2010 | "Option to Stiumlate" | UMEK, Beltek | 20 Progressive Tunes Volume 5 | Armada Music | |
| 2010 | "Army of Two" | UMEK, Beltek | Progressive Deluxe 2010 Volume 1 - 30 Tunes Exclusively Selected | Armada Music | |
| 2010 | "You Might Hear Nothing" | UMEK | Dataworx Code Series 01 | Dataworx Digital | |
| 2010 | "Sinful Ladies" | UMEK, Jay Lumen | Organic Techhouse Volume 3 | Great Stuff Recordings | |
| 2010 | "Sinful Ladies" | UMEK, Jay Lumen | Monsters Of Techno Volume 4 | Craft Music | |
| 2010 | "Sinful Ladies" | UMEK, Jay Lumen | Munich Disco Tech Volume 6 | Great Stuff Recordings | |
| 2010 | "Print This Story" | UMEK | 5 Years Of Manual Music Part 2/3 - Unmixed | Manual Music | |
| 2010 | "Print This Story" | UMEK | Progressive House Fever Volume 1 | Fever Records | |
| 2010 | "Dementia (Blatta & Inesha Barbarians Touch Remix)" | UMEK | Loopdiggaz – Straight Outta Looplandia Vol 2 | Hell Yeah Recordings | |
| 2010 | "Dementia (Enzo Elia Red Brick Remix)" | UMEK | And All Milani Says... Volume 2 | Hell Yeah Recordings | |
| 2010 | "Designed Persona (Andy Chatterley Remix)" | UMEK | Tronic Treatment 2010 | Tronic | |
| 2010 | "Before Violence" | UMEK | GU38 Black Rock Desert | Global Underground | Mixed by Carl Cox |
| 2011 | "Back In The Race" | UMEK, Beltek | Techno Prisoners | iCompilations | |
| 2011 | "Knight Rider" | Filth & Splendour | Techno Prisoners | iCompilations | |
| 2011 | "Can U Handle It?" | UMEK, Tomy DeClerque | Techno Prisoners | iCompilations | |
| 2011 | "Next Turn" | UMEK | New Years Clubbing Anthems | iCompilations | |
| 2011 | "Next Turn" | UMEK | Space Ibiza Unmixed | Cr2 Live & Direct Unmixed | |
| 2011 | "Next Turn" | UMEK | Cr2 Live & Direct Radio Show - Best Of The Year 2011 | Cr2 Records | |
| 2011 | "Next Turn" | UMEK | Tech House Sessions 2011 | Cr2 Records | Mixed by Paul Strive |
| 2011 | "Next Turn" | UMEK | Cr2 Live & Direct Radio Show – July 2011 | Cr2 Records | |
| 2011 | "Next Turn" | UMEK | Cr2 Presents Live & Direct Space Ibiza | Cr2 Records | Compiled By MYNC |
| 2011 | "Next Turn" | UMEK | Tech House Sessions - Volume 02 | Cr2 Records | |
| 2011 | "Back In The Race (Paul Strive Remix)" | UMEK, Beltek | Tech House Sessions - Volume 02 | Cr2 Records | |
| 2011 | "Back In The Race (Paul Strive Remix)" | UMEK, Beltek | Cr2 Introducing - Paul Strive | Cr2 Records | |
| 2011 | "Back In The Race (Paul Strive Remix)" | UMEK, Beltek | Live & Direct MYNC | Cr2 Records | |
| 2011 | "Back In The Race (Paul Strive Remix)" | UMEK, Beltek | Ibiza 2011 Unmixed: Beatport Special Edition | Cr2 Live & Direct Unmixed | |
| 2011 | "Madame Web" | UMEK, Beltek | Ibiza 2011 Unmixed: Beatport Special Edition | Cr2 Live & Direct Unmixed | |
| 2011 | "Madame Web" | UMEK, Beltek | Dirty Dutch Fallout – Unmixed DJ Version | Dirty Dutch Records | |
| 2011 | "Sinful Ladies" | UMEK, Jay Lumen | Munich Disco Tech - Final Chapter - The Gold Edition | Great Stuff Recordings | |
| 2011 | "Slap" | UMEK | Mixed For Feet Vol. 1 | Armada Music | Mixed by Gabriel & Dresden |
| 2011 | "Army Of Two (Jay Lumen Main Stage Remix)" | UMEK, Beltek | Techno 2011 Vol. 3 | Armada Music | |
| 2011 | "Is It?" | UMEK, Beltek | Progressive Power, Vol. 1 | Armada Music | |
| 2011 | "Is It?" | UMEK, Beltek | Techno 2011 Volume 1 | Armada Music | |
| 2011 | "Army of Two" | UMEK, Beltek | Progressive Tunes Volume 9 | Armada Music | |
| 2011 | "Army of Two" | UMEK, Beltek | Pilot 6 Collected Vol. 1 | Armada Music | |
| 2011 | "Complementary Access" | Umek, Stefano Noferini | Great Stuff Present Driving Beats Vol. 1 | KNM | |
| 2011 | "Sinful Ladies" | UMEK, Jay Lumen | Great Stuff Present Driving Beats Vol. 1 | KNM | |
| 2011 | "Sinful Ladies" | UMEK, Jay Lumen | Munich Disco Tech Volume 10 | Great Stuff Recordings | |
| 2011 | "Home (Umek Remix)" | Duca, Umek | Enjoy Techno, Volume 4 | Galore Music | |
| 2011 | "Home" | Duca, Umek | Plusquam Deluxe III | Plusquam Records | Compiled By Don Vitalo |
| 2011 | "Robot audience (Dataminions Remix)" | UMEK | Haute Couture 2011 | Haute Couture | Mixed by Claudia Cazacu |
| 2011 | "Ljubljana" | UMEK | Azuli Presents: Miami '11 | Azuli Records | |
| 2011 | "Ljubljana" | UMEK | BPM Japan Charity Album Vol. 3 | BPM JAPAN | |
| 2011 | "On The Edge" | UMEK, Christian Cambas | BPM Japan Charity Album Vol. 3 | BPM JAPAN | |
| 2011 | "Utopia (Tigerskin Remix)" | UMEK | Progrez EP – Volume 3 | Progrez | |
| 2011 | "Novi Sad" | UMEK | Organic Tech House Vol. 5 | Great Stuff Recordings | |
| 2011 | "Let The Bass Kick" | Umek, Beltek | Toolroom Records Ibiza 2011 Vol.1 | Toolroom Records | |
| 2011 | "System Of Rules" | UMEK | Toolroom Records Ibiza 2011 Vol.2 | Toolroom Records | |
| 2011 | "System Of Rules" | UMEK | Take Me To Ibiza (Day Edition) | Avenue Recordings | |
| 2011 | "System Of Rules" | UMEK | Spring Schlagers | 1605 | |
| 2011 | "On The Edge (Stefano Noferini Remix)" | UMEK, Christian Cambas | Remixed At 16:05 Volume 2 | 1605 | |
| 2011 | "On The Edge (Stefano Noferini Remix)" | UMEK, Christian Cambas | 1605 Ways To Deal With Christian Cambas | 1605 | Mixed by Christian Cambas |
| 2011 | "Carbon Occasions (Jordan Evane & Jim Zerga Remix)" | UMEK, Andja | Perceptions Of Pacha VII (Disc 2) | Pacha Recordings | |
| 2011 | "Carbon Occasions (Vocal)" | UMEK, Andja | Adult Entertainment With James Vevers: The Black Mixes Pt. 2 | Pacha Recordings | |
| 2011 | "Vice Grip" | UMEK | Ibiza Clubsounds Vol. 1 | Tronic Soundz | |
| 2011 | "We Are Not Done Yet" | UMEK, Beltek | Techno | 303Lovers | |
| 2011 | "Back In The Race" | UMEK, Beltek | 50 Techno Hits | Cr2 Records | |
| 2011 | "Madame Web" | UMEK, Beltek | 50 Techno Hits | Cr2 Records | |
| 2011 | "Original Challenge" | UMEK, Tomy DeClerque | 50 Techno Hits | Cr2 Records | |
| 2011 | "Can U Handle It?" | UMEK, Tomy DeClerque | 50 Techno Hits | Cr2 Records | |
| 2011 | "Knight Rider" | Filth & Splendour | 50 Techno Hits | Cr2 Records | |
| 2011 | "Dead Space" | UMEK | Via Notte - Corsican Summer Sessions Vol 1 | Elektik Media | |
| 2011 | "Dead Space" | UMEK, PHNTM | Toolroom Knights | Toolroom Records | Mixed by UMEK |
| 2011 | "Sarajevo" | UMEK | Toolroom Knights | Toolroom Records | Mixed by UMEK |
| 2011 | "Novi Sad (Uto Karem Remix)" | UMEK | Toolroom Knights | Toolroom Records | Mixed by UMEK |
| 2011 | "Novi Sad (Uto Karem Remix)" | UMEK | Monsters Of Techno Vol. 5 | Craft Music | |
| 2011 | "Freaks On The Floor" | UMEK, PHNTM | Toolroom Records Miami 2011 | Toolroom Records | |
| 2011 | "She Never Wants To Come Down" | UMEK, Traumer | Toolroom Records Miami 2011 | Toolroom Records | |
| 2011 | "Sundrenched Land" | UMEK, i Turk | 15 Years Confused Rec. - Happy Birthday Mix | Confused Records | |
| 2012 | "Freak It Out" | UMEK | Ibiza Weapons 2012 | Tiger Records | |
| 2012 | "Goes On" | UMEK, Stefano Noferini | Ibiza Weapons 2012 | Tiger Records | |
| 2012 | "Goes On" | UMEK, Stefano Noferini | Domplatte 7 (Die M8 Am Rhein) | Tiger Records | |
| 2012 | "Goes On" | UMEK, Stefano Noferini | Masterbeats (Vol. 2) | Tiger Records | |
| 2012 | "Goes On" | UMEK, Stefano Noferini | 3 Years Of Amazing Records Part 1 | Amazing Records | |
| 2012 | "Goes On" | UMEK, Stefano Noferini | United Colors Of House Vol. 17 | Recovery House | |
| 2012 | "Goes On" | UMEK, Stefano Noferini | United Colors Of House Volume 18 | Recovery House | |
| 2012 | "Goes On" | UMEK, Stefano Noferini | Night & Day | Yoshitoshi Recordings | Mixed by Sharam |
| 2012 | "Goes On" | UMEK, Stefano Noferini | INDAHOUSE Vol 1 | Ego | |
| 2012 | "Goes On" | UMEK, Stefano Noferini | Deeperfect Best Of 2012 | Deeperfect Records | |
| 2012 | "100% Sure" | UMEK | Deeperfect Best Of 2012 | Deeperfect Records | |
| 2012 | "100% Sure" | UMEK | Datatech Volume 4 | Recovery Tech | |
| 2012 | "Wombing" | UMEK, Olivier Giacomotto | Best of Definitive 2012 | Definitive Recordings | |
| 2012 | "Wombing (DJ Tonio Remix)" | UMEK, Olivier Giacomotto | Best of Definitive Remixes 2012 | Definitive Recordings | |
| 2012 | "Utopia (Tigerskin Remix)" | UMEK | Focus On: Renaissance | PMI Dance | |
| 2012 | "Utopia (Tigerskin Remix)" | UMEK | suSu Refreshed - Sexy Electronic House Beats & Dub | PMI Dance | |
| 2012 | "It's Simple But It Works Like Fcuk" | UMEK | Yaiza Records Winter Compilation 2012 | Yaiza Records | |
| 2012 | "Ricochet Effect" | UMEK | Transitions - Vol. 3 | PMI Dance, Renaissance Recordings | Mixed by John Digweed |
| 2012 | "Unclear Mechanics" | UMEK | Best Of Toolroom Records | Toolroom Records | |
| 2012 | "Unclear Mechanics" | UMEK | Toolroom Ibiza Essentials 2012 | Toolroom Records | |
| 2012 | "One More Sound" | UMEK | Toolroom NYE Essentials 2012 | Toolroom Records | |
| 2012 | "One More Sound" | UMEK | Toolroom Records Ibiza 2012 Vol.1 | Toolroom Records | |
| 2012 | "We Are Not Done Yet (Marshall Remix)" | UMEK, Beltek | Club Session Presented By Boogie Pimps | Club Session | Mixed by Boogie Pimps |
| 2012 | "We Are Not Done Yet (Marshall Remix)" | UMEK, Beltek | Technorama 5.0 | Recovery Tech | |
| 2012 | "We Are Not Done Yet (Marshall Remix)" | UMEK, Beltek | Is This Techno? Volume 4 | Recovery Tech | |
| 2012 | "Let's Go (Tube & Berger Mix)" | UMEK | Tech Language Volume 5 | Recovery Tech | |
| 2012 | "Let's Go" | UMEK | Re:Select | Voltaire Music | |
| 2012 | "Let's Go" | UMEK | Deeperfect ADE 2012 | Deeperfect Records | Mixed by Mladen Tomic |
| 2012 | "Simple But It Works Like Fcuk (Sinisa Tamamovic Remix)" | UMEK | Bootleg Social: Prohibition Series 01 | Bootleg Social Records | |
| 2012 | "It's Simple But It Works Like Fcuk" | UMEK | Headliners | Ministry Of Sound | Mixed by Sander van Doorn |
| 2012 | "Out Of Play" | UMEK | Ministry Of Sound Live: Brazil | Ministry Of Sound | |
| 2012 | "Jack the Groove" | UMEK | Saturday Sessions | Ministry Of Sound | |
| 2012 | "Ljubljana" | UMEK | Trade Deluxe Mixed By Pagano, Nick Tcherniak & Nick Denton | Toolbox House | Mixed By Pagano, Nick Tcherniak & Nick Denton |
| 2012 | "OMGWTF" | UMEK | Trade Deluxe Mixed By Pagano, Nick Tcherniak & Nick Denton | Toolbox House | Mixed By Pagano, Nick Tcherniak & Nick Denton |
| 2012 | "Divide (Umek Remix)" | Filth & Splendour, Kalva | Pure Tech 4 | Bonzai Basiks | |
| 2012 | "Divide (Umek Remix)" | Filth & Splendour, Kalva | Progrez EP – Volume 8 | Progrez | |
| 2012 | "Chosen" | UMEK, Mike Vale | I Rave You! - Filthy House & Sexy Electro | KNM | |
| 2012 | "Chosen" | UMEK, Mike Vale | Madre Natura Volume 9 | Natura Viva | |
| 2012 | "Chosen" | UMEK, Mike Vale | Ministry Of Sound Live Amsterdam | Ministry Of Sound | |
| 2012 | "Slicing & Dicing" | UMEK | Ministry Of Sound Live Amsterdam | Ministry Of Sound | |
| 2012 | "How's Your Body" | UMEK, Mike Vale | Ministry Of Sound Live Amsterdam | Ministry Of Sound | |
| 2012 | "How's Your Body" | UMEK, Mike Vale | Sensation - Source of Light - Exclusive Edition | Be Yourself Music | |
| 2012 | "How's Your Body" | UMEK, Mike Vale | La Troya (Amnesia Ibiza 2012) | DJ Center Records | |
| 2012 | "How's Your Body" | UMEK, Mike Vale | Mike Vale Presents Selezione Naturale Volume 1 | Natura Viva | Mixed by Mike Vale |
| 2012 | "We Are Not Done Yet (Alex Kenji & Manuel de la Mare Remix)" | UMEK, Beltek | Urban Vibez – The Underground Sound of House Music Vol. 12 | Recovery House | |
| 2012 | "We Are Not Done Yet (Alex Kenji & Manuel de la Mare Remix)" | UMEK, Beltek | Stereonized – Tech House Selection Vol. 7 | Recovery House | |
| 2012 | "We Are Not Done Yet (Alex Kenji & Manuel de la Mare Remix)" | UMEK, Beltek | Faces Of House – House Music Collection Vol 13 | Recovery House | |
| 2012 | "We Are Not Done Yet" | UMEK, Beltek | Tech Language Volume 4 | Recovery House | |
| 2012 | "Ljubljana (Album Edit)" | UMEK | Global Techno Sessions Vol. 1 | LW Recordings | |
| 2012 | "Carbon Occasions (John Jacobsen Remix)" | Umek, Andja | Heavenly Night 2 | Heavenly Bodies | |
| 2012 | "Circles of Hell (Sébastien Léger Remix)" | UMEK | Plusquam Deluxe Vol. 6 | Plusquam Records | Compiled By Don Vitalo |
| 2012 | "Slap (Spektre Remix)" | UMEK | Compiled By Don Vitalo | Plusquam Records | |
| 2012 | "Slicing & Dicing" | UMEK | Toolroom Knights mixed by Stefano Noferini | Toolroom Records | Mixed By Stefano Noferini |
| 2012 | "Slicing & Dicing" | UMEK | Toolroom Records Ibiza 2012 Vol.2 | Toolroom Records | |
| 2012 | "Slicing & Dicing" | UMEK | Amnesia Ibiza Summer 2012 | DJ Center Records | |
| 2012 | "Sunday at El Row" | UMEK | Amnesia Ibiza Summer 2012 | DJ Center Records | |
| 2012 | "Army of Two" | UMEK, Beltek | 40 Best Ibiza Anthems Ever - Part 2 | ARVA | |
| 2012 | "Twisted Route" | UMEK | Techness Shot Vol. 5 | Xelon Entertainment | |
| 2012 | "Next Turn" | UMEK | Miami 2012 | Cr2 Records | Mixed by MYNC & Nicky Romero |
| 2012 | "Next Turn" | UMEK | Best Of Cr2 2012 | Cr2 Records | Mixed by MYNC |
| 2012 | "Next Turn" | UMEK | Cr2 ADE Anthems 2012 | Cr2 Records | |
| 2012 | "Next Turn" | UMEK | Superstar DJ's Vol. 2 | Cr2 Records | |
| 2012 | "Back In The Race" | UMEK, Beltek | Superstar DJ's Vol. 2 | Cr2 Records | |
| 2012 | "Knight Rider" | Filth & Splendour | Superstar DJ's Vol. 2 | Cr2 Records | |
| 2012 | "Madame Web" | UMEK, Beltek | Superstar DJ's Vol. 2 | Cr2 Records | |
| 2012 | "Madame Web" | UMEK, Beltek | Ibiza Opening Party | iCompilations | |
| 2012 | "Scrambled" | Filth & Splendour | Ibiza Opening Party | iCompilations | |
| 2012 | "Get Sucked" | UMEK | Music With Love - Charity For Emilia Romagna | Natura Viva | |
| 2012 | "Get Sucked" | UMEK | Bora - Bora Ibiza 2012 | King Of Ibiza Records | Mixed By Alex Miles and Toby Holguin & DJ Moffour |
| 2012 | "Let The Bass Kick" | UMEK, Beltek | Bora - Bora Ibiza 2012 | King Of Ibiza Records | Mixed By Alex Miles and Toby Holguin & DJ Moffour |
| 2012 | "Profile Lost (Djuma Soundsystem Beatless Version)" | UMEK | Beatless - A Soundtrack | SOUNDZ | |
| 2012 | "Complementary Access" | UMEK, Stefano Noferini | House Top 40 (Best of Progressive Tech - & Electro House) | KNM | |
| 2012 | "Complementary Access" | UMEK, Stefano Noferini | Dirty Electro House X - Summer Edition | KNM | |
| 2012 | "Complementary Access" | UMEK, Stefano Noferini | Dirty Electro House XI - Fall Equinox Edition | KNM | |
| 2012 | "Complementary Access" | UMEK, Stefano Noferini | Berlin Afterhour 3 - From Minimal To Techno - From Electro To House | KNM | |
| 2012 | "Complementary Access" | UMEK, Stefano Noferini | Total Minimal, Vol. 6 | KNM | |
| 2012 | "Back In The Race (Paul Strive Remix)" | UMEK, Beltek | Ibiza Terrace Tech House | iCompilations | |
| 2012 | "Original Challenge" | UMEK, Tomy DeClerque | Winter Club Hits | iCompilations | |
| 2012 | "Original Challenge" | UMEK, Tomy DeClerque | Big Room House - Vol. 2 | Cr2 Records | |
| 2012 | "Hot Pick" | Filth & Splendour | Big Room House - Vol. 2 | Cr2 Records | |
| 2012 | "Dementia (Enzo Elia Brick Road Remix)" | UMEK | Enzo Elia? Hell Yeah | Hell Yeah Recordings | Mixed by Enzo Elia |
| 2012 | "Profile Lost" | UMEK | MIX:REMIX | SOUNDZ | |
| 2012 | "Twisted Route (Jeff Bennett Remix)" | UMEK | MIX:REMIX | SOUNDZ | |
| 2012 | "Profile Lost (Djuma Soundsystem Remix)" | UMEK | MIX:REMIX | SOUNDZ | |
| 2012 | "Profile Lost (Djuma Soundsystem Remix)" | UMEK | SOUNDZ VOL.4 | SOUNDZ | Compiled by The Soundz |
| 2012 | "Profile Lost (Djuma Soundsystem Remix)" | UMEK | Djuma Soundsystem Presents The 3rd Dimension of Soundz | SOUNDZ | |
| 2012 | "Twisted Route (Jeff Bennett Remix)" | UMEK | Djuma Soundsystem Presents The 3rd Dimension of Soundz | SOUNDZ | |
| 2012 | "Split" | UMEK | Toolroom Knights (Mixed By Eddie Halliwell) | Toolroom Records | Mixed By Eddie Halliwell |
| 2012 | "Touch After (Original Club Mix)" | UMEK, Beltek | Rhythm Distrikt 01 | Toolroom Records | |
| 2012 | "Jack The Groove (Original Club Mix)" | UMEK | Toolroom Records Miami 2012 | Toolroom Records | |
| 2012 | "Home" | Duca, UMEK | Comp, Vol. 3 | Minimalminuts | |
| 2012 | | | Six Years | Twisted Frequency Recordings | |
| 2013 | "Wombing (DJ Tonio Remix)" | UMEK, Olivier Giacomotto | Midnight Heroes, Vol. 3 (Special Edition! 4 DJ Mixes & 58 Unmixed Tracks for Underground People) | Tech You Very Much! | Mixed By A.C.K. |
| 2013 | "Wombing (DJ Tonio Remix)" | UMEK, Olivier Giacomotto | We Are ADSR | ADSR Records | |
| 2013 | "Wombing (DJ Tonio Remix)" | UMEK, Olivier Giacomotto | Tech Cubes, Vol. 5 - Selection of Finest Tech - House Tunes! | Tretmuehle | |
| 2013 | "Wombing (DJ Tonio Remix)" | UMEK, Olivier Giacomotto | Monodisco Volume 6 | Recovery Tech | |
| 2013 | "Wombing (DJ Tonio Remix)" | UMEK, Olivier Giacomotto | Global House Sounds Volume 16 | Recovery House | |
| 2013 | "Wombing (DJ Tonio Remix)" | UMEK, Olivier Giacomotto | Stereonized Tech House Selection Vol.10 | Recovery House | |
| 2013 | "Cause and Effect" | UMEK, Groovebox | Best Of Toolroom Records 2013 | Toolroom Records | |
| 2013 | "Move Around" | UMEK | Mike Newman Presents Groove Your Body Vol 2 | WTF! Music | |
| 2013 | "Move Around" | UMEK | Music With Love - Charity For Sardegna | Natura Viva | |
| 2013 | "Move Around" | UMEK | Electrolicious, Vol. 3 | BNM | Compiled/mixed by Dennis Bohn |
| 2013 | "Move Around" | UMEK | Balearic Bangers from Ibiza (A Fine Selection of Deep & Tech House Grooves) | KNM | |
| 2013 | "Army of Two" | UMEK, Beltek | 10 Years Armada | Armada Music | |
| 2013 | "Army of Two" | UMEK, Beltek | Heroes Of Trance 2013 | ARVA | |
| 2013 | "Wombing" | UMEK, Olivier Giacomotto | Techno Science Fiction Vol. 1 (Massive Techno & Minimal Tracks) | Tech You Very Much! | Compiled by A.C.K. |
| 2013 | "Wombing" | UMEK, Olivier Giacomotto | The Art Of Sound, Vol. 3 | Play My Track Recordings | |
| 2013 | "Wombing" | UMEK, Olivier Giacomotto | House Generation presented by Chris Montana & Chris Bekker | Recovery House | |
| 2013 | "Let's Go" | UMEK | Rocking Down The House - Electrified House Tunes Vol.17 | Recovery House | |
| 2013 | "Gatex (Tiesto Remix)" | UMEK | 30 Trance Classics | Essential Dance | |
| 2013 | "Get Funk" | Siwell, UMEK | The Journey (Hell & Heaven) Part1 | Sphera Records | |
| 2013 | "You Get Used To All The Madness" | Siwell, UMEK | Toolroom Records Miami 2013 | Toolroom Records | |
| 2013 | "Card Gamble (F. Sonic & Andrew Technique Remix)" | UMEK | Hotfingers Talks Selected And Mixed By DJ PP | hotfingers | Compiled/mixed by DJ PP |
| 2013 | "Mighty Wind (Original Club Mix)" | UMEK, DJ Dan | Rhythm Distrikt 05 | Toolroom Records | |
| 2013 | "Original Challenge" | UMEK, Tomy DeClerque | Ibiza 2013 Part 2 | Cr2 Records | |
| 2013 | "Original Challenge" | UMEK, Tomy DeClerque | EDM House | iCompilations | |
| 2013 | "Scrambled" | Filth & Splendour | This Is Progressive House | iCompilations | |
| 2013 | "Chosen" | UMEK, Mike Vale | NYC To Miami Mixed By Electrobios & B.O.N.G. | Cherry Drop Records | Mixed by Electrobios & B.O.N.G. |
| 2013 | "Chosen" | UMEK, Mike Vale | Total Dance - Club House Essentials Pt.1 | KNM | |
| 2013 | "Fluid Feel" | UMEK, Mike Vale | Toolroom Ten | Toolroom Records | |
| 2013 | "Out Of Play" | UMEK, Beltek | Toolroom Records Ibiza 2013 Vol.1 | Toolroom Records | |
| 2013 | "I Need You" | UMEK | DreamBeach Villaricos Compilation 2013 | Alma Soul Music | |
| 2013 | "Let's Go (Tube & Berger Remix)" | UMEK | Deep City Grooves Paris | Recovery Tech | |
| 2013 | "We Are Not Done Yet (Alex Kenji and Manuel de la Mare Remix)" | UMEK, Beltek | 10 Essential Sureplayer | Club Session | |
| 2013 | "We Are Not Done Yet (Alex Kenji and Manuel de la Mare Remix)" | UMEK, Beltek | Get Smashed! Vol. 2 | Smash Music | |
| 2013 | "Back In The Race" | UMEK, Beltek | Tech House – Volume 01 | Cr2 Records | |
| 2013 | "Next Turn" | UMEK | Tech House – Volume 01 | Cr2 Records | |
| 2013 | "Next Turn" | UMEK | The Yacht Week Volume 3 | Cr2 Records | |
| 2013 | "Next Turn" | UMEK | Tech House Sessions – Volume 03 | Cr2 Records | |
| 2013 | "Next Turn" | UMEK | EDM Tech House | iCompilations | |
| 2013 | "Back In The Race (Paul Strive Remix)" | UMEK, Beltek | EDM Tech House | iCompilations | |
| 2013 | "Back In The Race (Paul Strive Remix)" | UMEK, Beltek | EDM Tech House Essentials | iCompilations | |
| 2013 | "Back In The Race (Paul Strive Remix)" | UMEK, Beltek | New York Underground | Cr2 Records | |
| 2013 | "Madame Web" | UMEK, Beltek | New York Underground | Cr2 Records | |
| 2013 | "Carbon Occasions (Denis Naidanow Minimal Vocal Remix)" | UMEK, Andja | Pure Pacha Summer 2013 | Pacha Recordings | |
| 2013 | "Carbon Occasions (Denis Naidanow Minimal Vocal Remix)" | UMEK, Andja | Pacha Recordings Miami | Pacha Recordings | |
| 2013 | "Eternity (No Time Mix)" | UMEK, Uto Karem | 5 Years Of Agile Recordings | Agile Recordings | |
| 2013 | "Deep Inside (Format:B Remix)" | UMEK | 5 Years Of Agile Recordings | Agile Recordings | |
| 2013 | "Klaxon" | UMEK, Spektre | 1605*5 | 1605 | |
| 2013 | "Korea" | UMEK, Pleasurekraft | WTF! Tunes Volume 12 | WTF! Music | |
| 2013 | "Goes On" | UMEK, Stefano Noferini | Electrify! Presented By Danniel Selfmade | Recovery Tech | |
| 2013 | "Goes On" | UMEK, Stefano Noferini | Festival Classics (Vol. 2) | Tiger Records | |
| 2013 | "Goes On" | UMEK, Stefano Noferini | Miami 2013 Tech House Hot Tracks | Madzonegeneration Records | Compiled by Paolo Madzone Zampetti |
| 2013 | "Goes On" | UMEK, Stefano Noferini | Club Session Presented By Tune Brothers | Club Session | |
| 2013 | "Goes On" | UMEK, Stefano Noferini | Markus Binapfl - 10 Years Miami | Tiger Records | |
| 2013 | "Goes On" | UMEK, Stefano Noferini | Kraftworkxs Tekkno | Tiger Records | |
| 2013 | "Wombing (Dub Mix)" | UMEK, Olivier Giacomotto | Monotone Vol. 17 – Tech House Selection | Recovery House | |
| 2013 | "Wombing (Dub Mix)" | UMEK, Olivier Giacomotto | Faces Of House - House Music Collection Vol. 17 | Recovery House | |
| 2013 | "Wombing (Dub Mix)" | UMEK, Olivier Giacomotto | Dub Session Volume 10 | Recovery House | |
| 2013 | "My House" | UMEK, Mike Vale | WTF! Tunes Volume 11 | WTF! Music | |
| 2013 | "Fluid Feel (Original Club Mix)" | UMEK, Mike Vale | Toolroom Knights Mixed by UMEK 2.0 | Toolroom Records | |
| 2013 | "Love To Dance (Original Club Mix)" | UMEK | Toolroom Knights Mixed by UMEK 2.0 | Toolroom Records | |
| 2013 | "Kuzla Prevarantska (Original Club Mix)" | UMEK | Toolroom Knights Mixed by UMEK 2.0 | Toolroom Records | |
| 2013 | "100% Sure" | UMEK | Confronted Part 4 | Recovery Tech | |
| 2013 | "100% Sure" | UMEK | Principles Of Techno 4.0 | Doppelgänger | |
| 2013 | "100% Sure" | UMEK | Techno With Balls, Vol. 4 | Sound Supreme | |
| 2013 | "100% Sure" | UMEK | Club Session Presented By Don Rossi | Club Session | |
| 2013 | "100% Sure" | UMEK | Groove Circus Vol. 4 | Wasabi Recordings | |
| 2013 | "Spank!" | UMEK | Elektro Presents Spinnin_Records - Part 2 | Spinnin' Records | |
| 2013 | "Spank!" | UMEK | Miami House Volume 5 | Spinnin' Records | |
| 2013 | "Kuzla Prevarantski" | UMEK | Miami Sessions 2013 | Ministry Of Sound | |
| 2013 | "Unclear Mechanics" | UMEK | House Bless You By Quentin Mosimann | DJ Center Records | |
| 2014 | "Goes On" | UMEK, Stefano Noferini | Monotone Vol. 28 - Tech House Selection | Recovery House | |
| 2014 | "Goes On" | UMEK, Stefano Noferini | Nothing but House Music Vol. 1 | Re:vibe Music | |
| 2014 | "Goes On" | UMEK, Stefano Noferini | HTFT VOL. 5 (HARD TO FIND TRACKS) | Tiger Records | |
| 2014 | "Goes On" | UMEK, Stefano Noferini | Kraftworxs - TEKKNO | Tiger Records | |
| 2014 | "Goes On (Oscar Aguilera, Guille Placencia & George Privatti Remix)" | UMEK, Stefano Noferini | Deeperfect Ibiza 2014 Mixed By Oscar Aguilera | Deeperfect Records | |
| 2014 | "Cvile Mi Jaja" | UMEK | Full House Volume 26 | Recovery House | |
| 2014 | "Cvile Mi Jaja" | UMEK | House Generation Presented By Slideback | Recovery House | |
| 2014 | "Cvile Mi Jaja" | UMEK | Advance! Vol. 10 | Recovery House | |
| 2014 | "Cvile Mi Jaja" | UMEK | House Generation Presented By ESQUIRE | Recovery House | |
| 2014 | "Cvile Mi Jaja" | UMEK | House Nation Clubbing 2014 | Recovery House | |
| 2014 | "Cvile Mi Jaja" | UMEK | New York House Odyssey, Vol. 8 | Restore Music | |
| 2014 | "Cvile Mi Jaja" | UMEK | Deeperfect Annual 2013 | Deeperfect Records | |
| 2014 | "Cvile Mi Jaja" | UMEK | Tech House for the VIP Room, Vol. 3 (Extraordinary Unmixed Tracks) | Tech You Very Much! | |
| 2014 | "Cvile Mi Jaja" | UMEK | The Best of Tech You Very Much (Top 24 All Time Tech House Hits) | Tech You Very Much! | |
| 2014 | "Cvile Mi Jaja (Groovebox Remix)" | UMEK | Tech House Masterpieces | Tech You Very Much! | |
| 2014 | "Cvile Mi Jaja (Groovebox Remix)" | UMEK | Deep and Twisted, Vol. 4 | ADSR Records | |
| 2014 | "Cvile Mi Jaja (Groovebox Remix)" | UMEK | Ibiza Glamour House | On Air | |
| 2014 | "Cvile Mi Jaja (Groovebox Remix)" | UMEK | House, House And More F..king House Vol. 6 | Recovery House | |
| 2014 | "Cvile Mi Jaja (Groovebox Remix)" | UMEK | Advance! Vol. 8 | Recovery House | |
| 2014 | "Cvile Mi Jaja (Groovebox Remix)" | UMEK | Underground Series Tokyo | Club Session | |
| 2014 | "Cvile Mi Jaja (Groovebox Remix)" | UMEK | Club Session Pres. Club Weapons No. 51 | Club Session | |
| 2014 | "Cvile Mi Jaja (Groovebox Remix)" | UMEK | Rocking Down The House In Miami 2014 | Club Session | |
| 2014 | "100% Sure" | UMEK | Rocking Down The House In Ibiza 2014 | Club Session | |
| 2014 | "Carbon Occasions" | UMEK, Andja | Kick-Off Brazil - The World Cup House Party | Music Is The Answer | |
| 2014 | "Carbon Occasions" | UMEK, Andja | 12 Bombs To Rock - The House Edition 7 | House Of House | |
| 2014 | "Carbon Occasions (Dee Marcus 2K13 Remix)" | UMEK, Andja | Takeover IBIZA 2014 - The House Edition | House Of House | |
| 2014 | "Carbon Occasions (Dee Marcus 2K13 Remix)" | UMEK, Andja | House Is A Feeling Vol. 12 | House Of House | |
| 2014 | "Carbon Occasions (Dee Marcus 2K13 Remix)" | UMEK, Andja | Ibiza Opening Party 2014 (Edition 1) | Club Control | |
| 2014 | "Next Turn" | UMEK | New York Deep & Tech House Volume 2 | iCompilations | |
| 2014 | "Next Turn" | UMEK | Tech House Terrace Party | iCompilations | |
| 2014 | "Next Turn" | UMEK | Underground Deep & Tech House | iCompilations | |
| 2014 | "Next Turn" | UMEK | Tech House - Volume 3 | Cr2 Records | |
| 2014 | "Mighty Wind (Album Edit) | UMEK, DJ Dan | Nothing But A Party | InStereo Recordings | |
| 2014 | "Wombing" | UMEK, Olivier Giacomotto | From The Speakers Vol. 13 | Recovery House | |
| 2014 | "Let's Go" | UMEK | From The Speakers Vol. 12 | Recovery House | |
| 2014 | "Cause and Effect" | UMEK, Groovebox | Elektika Miami, Vol.1 | Elektika | |
| 2014 | "Cause and Effect" | UMEK, Groovebox | Toolroom Records Selector Series: 15 Federico Scavo | Toolroom Records | |
| 2014 | "Unclear Mechanics" | UMEK | Toolroom Records Selector Series: 16 The Cube Guys | Toolroom Records | |
| 2014 | "All I Want" | UMEK, Mike Vale | Toolroom Ibiza 2014 | Toolroom Records | |
| 2014 | "Wombing (Dub Mix)" | UMEK, Olivier Giacomotto | Artificial Moves, Vol. 4: Inspirations in Techhouse | Complex Textures | |
| 2014 | "Get Funk" | UMEK, Siwell | The Best Of Sphera Volume 9 | Sphera Records | |
| 2014 | "Move Around" | UMEK | Global Underground 2014 | Global Underground | |
| 2014 | "Move Around" | UMEK | Running Electronica 2 (For a Cool Rush of Blood to the Head) | KNM | |
| 2014 | "Unlock My Synth Vein" | UMEK, Heartik | Tech in da House 3 (A Fine Tech House Selection) | KNM | |
