= Finest Moments (disambiguation) =

Finest Moments is a 2002 album by Louise.

Finest Moments may also refer to:

- The Finest Moments, a 1989 album by Sandi Patty
- Finest Moments Volume 1, a 2013 compilation album by Umek
