= Manuel De La Mare =

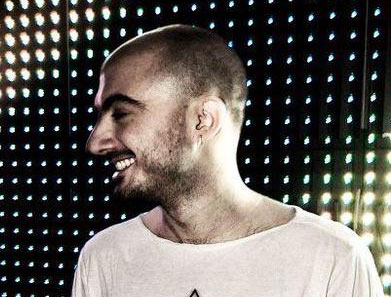

Background information
- Also known as: Sara Galli, After Tea, Combo
- Born: 28 November 1979 (age 46); Barga, Italy
- Genres: Techno, Tech house, deep house, progressive house, chill out
- Occupations: Producer, DJ
- Labels: Hotfingers, 303lovers
- Website: www.manueldelamare.com

Manuel De La Mare (born 28 November 1979 in Barga, Italy) is an Italian music producer and recording artist.

== Biography ==
Manuel De La Mare is also known as Sara Galli, After Tea, and Combo. His music combines elements of Italo dance, filtered and deep house, techno beats, and minimal melodies. Manuel launched his own labels - 303lovers and hotfingers - in 2007 alongside Alex Kenji and Luigi Rocca. He has collaborated with artists including Mark Knight, John Acquaviva, and Feddle Le Grand and has worked with multiple music labels, including Universal, Toolroom, Ministry of Sound, Tiger Records, Spinnin, Definitive, and Stealth. Beatport awarded him as the best remixer in 2011, following his nomination for Best Deep House and Techno Artist in 2010.

Manuel says that his remix of Ian Round’s track ‘Dancin’ was the turning point of his career as the track went on to the reach the Top 10 Beatport chart and pick up support from acclaimed stars like Roger Sanchez. Manuel’s production skills grabbed the attention of DJs worldwide and he soon found himself remixing for names such as Robbie Rivera.

In 2011 Manuel did a collaboration with the UK producer and owner of Toolroom Records Mark Knight called ‘Snapshot’, followed by other originals "La Musica Me Hace Mas Feliz","Shaken Not Slurred" together with John Acquaviva and Luigi Rocca,"Ameno" released on Spinnin' Records. On the remix front he had a number of exciting projects throughout the 2012 summer. First up is a remix for Fedde Le Grand’s new track ‘Metrum’.Other remixes duties included Wally Lopez, Paolo Mojo and one for Sander Van Doorn's new single ‘Love is Darkness’.

In 2012 started his dj residency at Hard Rock, Las Vegas, followed gigs at Ultra Music Festival In Miami, Space Ibiza, Ministry Of Sound London, Amnesia Miami and many others.

In 2012 Manuel remixed the well known house anthem together with Alex Kenji - called I Love The Music by Cevin Fisher, Seamus Haji released on Strictly Rhythm which was one of the top 10 house tracks for a month. He also remixed the electronic music composer Bostich - Yello released in 2012 on Tiger Records. In November 2012 was released his mixed compilation together with Alex Kenji and Luigi Rocca for Toolroom Records.
