= Oliver Koletzki =

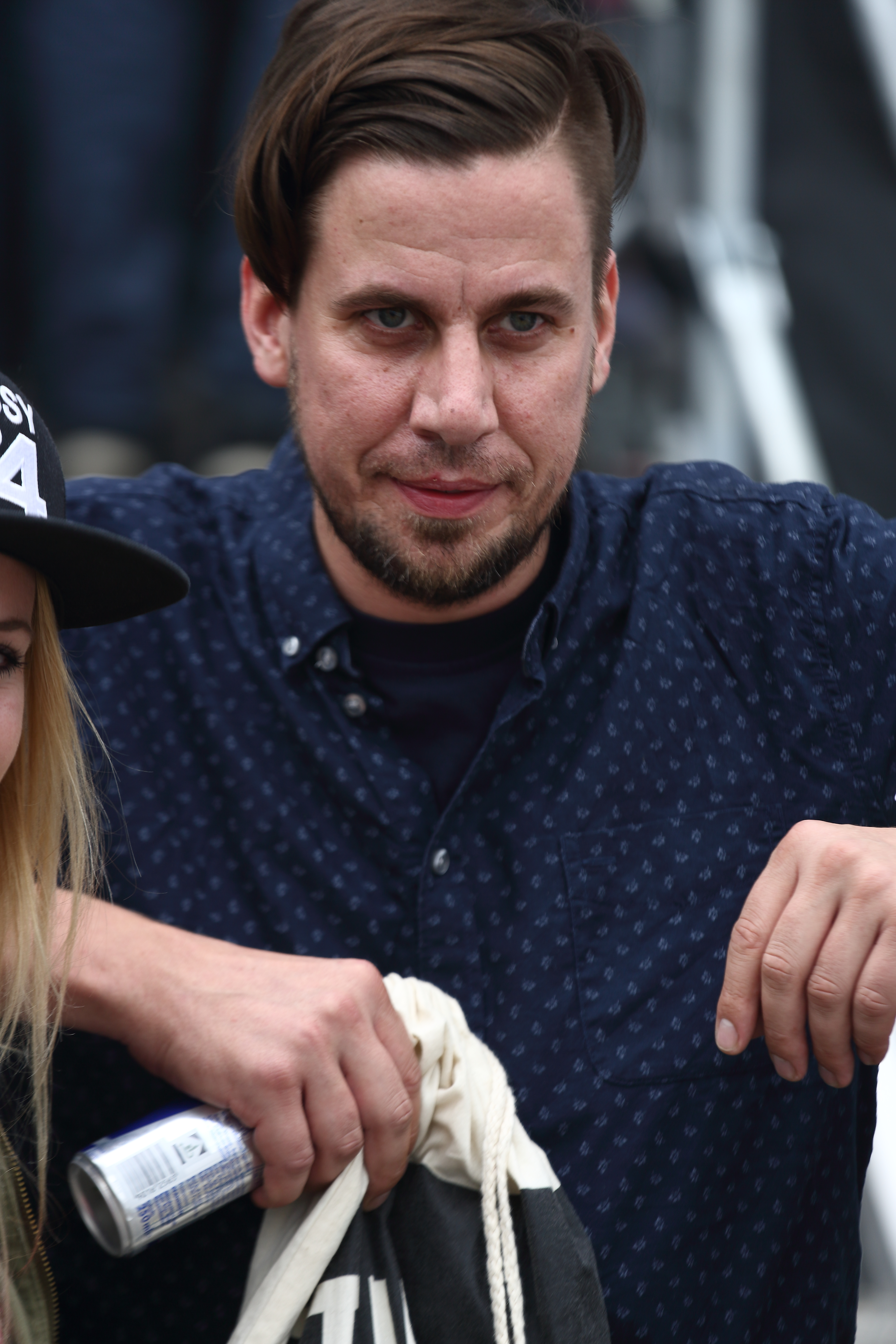
- Koletzki in 2014

Background information
- Born: 5 October 1974 (age 51)
- Origin: Braunschweig, Germany
- Occupations: DJ, music producer
- Website: www.oliver-koletzki.de

Oliver Koletzki (born 5 October 1974 in Braunschweig) is a German dance and house music DJ and producer based in Berlin. He gained wider recognition in 2005 with "Der Mückenschwarm" track and later co-founded the record label Stil vor Talent.

== Career ==
Koletzki grew up in Braunschweig, where he took piano lessons and played in a cover band as a teenager. He later became interested in hip hop, house and techno. Around 2000, he moved to Berlin, where he studied musicology at Humboldt University of Berlin for two semesters and became involved in the city's electronic music scene.

In 2005, his track "Der Mückenschwarm" came to the attention of Sven Väth, who released it through Cocoon Recordings. Later in the same year Koletzki co-founded the Berlin record label Stil vor Talent with Slawjana Ulrich.

Koletzki released his debut studio album, Get Wasted, in 2007 and continued to release albums through Stil vor Talent.

== Awards ==
In 2005, readers of Groove named Koletzki Best Newcomer. "Der Mückenschwarm" was also voted Track of the Year in the magazine's 2005 readers' poll.

== Discography ==
=== Albums ===
Year	Title	Peak chart positions	
Year	Title	GER	SWI
2007	Get Wasted	—	—
2009	Großstadtmärchen	—	—
2010	Lovestoned with Fran	87	—
2012	Großstadtmärchen 2	19	82
2014	I Am OK	25	25
2017	The Arc of Tension	86	94
2018	Noordhoek with Niko Schwind	—	—
2019	Fire in the Jungle	—	—
2021	Made of Wood	—	—
2023	Trip to Sanity	—	—
2026	12	—	—

=== Selected singles and EPs ===
- "Blackout" (2005)
- "Der Mückenschwarm" (2005)
- "Da bleibt er ganz cool" (2006)
- "Eferding Berlin" (2006), with Florian Meindl
- "Follow Up" (2006)
- "Granulum / Nimbus" (2006), with Martin Eyerer
- "Yes I Can Fly" (2006)
- "Don't Forget to Go Home" (2007)
- "Kolibri" (2007), with Florian Meindl
- "Music from the Heart" (2007)
- "Pulse Your Hands" (2007), with Martin Eyerer
- "Hypnotized" (2009), with Fran
- "Zuckerwatte" (2009), with Juli Holz
- "Arrow and Bow" (2010), with Fran
- "Echoes" (2010), with Fran
- "Iyéwayé / Ipuza" (2015)
- "Black Walls / My Vision" (2016), with Niko Schwind

=== DJ mixes ===
- The Process (2006), Resopal Schallware
- Clubload (2006), Polystar Records
- Cocorico Session 01 (2007), Mantra Vibes

=== Selected remixes ===
- Mick Rubin – "Als es passierte" (2005)
- Oliver Huntemann – "Radio" (2005)
- Cassius – "Toop Toop" (2006)
- John Acquaviva – "Feedback" (2006)
- Kai Kurve – "Mir ist schlecht" (2008)
- Tobias Lützenkirchen – "Drei Tage wach" (2008)
- Wir sind Helden – "Die Wespe" (2010)
- Hurts – "Stay" (2010)

== See also ==
- German electronic music
- Music of Berlin
