= Christian Cambas =

DJ and music producer

Christian Cambas (born 28 November 1980) is a DJ and producer based in Athens, Greece. He is mostly known for his releases on DJ Umek’s 1605 label, and his entry at number 88 of the DJ Mag Top 100 poll in 2005.

== Early life and education ==
Cambas was born in the United States, and grew up in Athens. Christian studied and graduated from the Berklee College of Music in 2000 with a degree in Music Production and Sound Engineering.

== Career ==
While living in Boston he started as a drum and bass DJ while also working at Boston Beat, a local record store. During that time he also set up his own vinyl label called First Commandment Records.

After returning to Athens, Christian got involved in production and remixing for Planetworks, a seminal Greek dance label. He also briefly worked for a DJ booking agency in Athens.

In 2001, he warmed up for artists including Carl Cox, John Digweed and Sasha. This led to a two-year residency at the +SODA in Athens.

His debut track “It Scares Me” was released on John Digweed's Bedrock imprint in November 2003. His early remix schedule included Anarcrusan's “In My Mind” for Yoshitoshi/Shinichi.

In addition to his production career he also started teaching a college-level Sound Engineering and Music Technology course in 2003, which he is still involved in today.

=== Devilock Records ===
On June 6th, 2006 (or 06/06/06), Cambas formed Devilock Records, featuring high-profile artists such as Jerome Isma-Ae, The Horrorist, Thomas Penton and early 2000s artists. The label is no longer active.

=== Sabotage Records ===
Sabotage Records is a partnership between Press & Play and Christian Cambas, specializing in techno and tech house.
