= Jay Lumen =

Hungarian techno producer and DJ (born 1981)

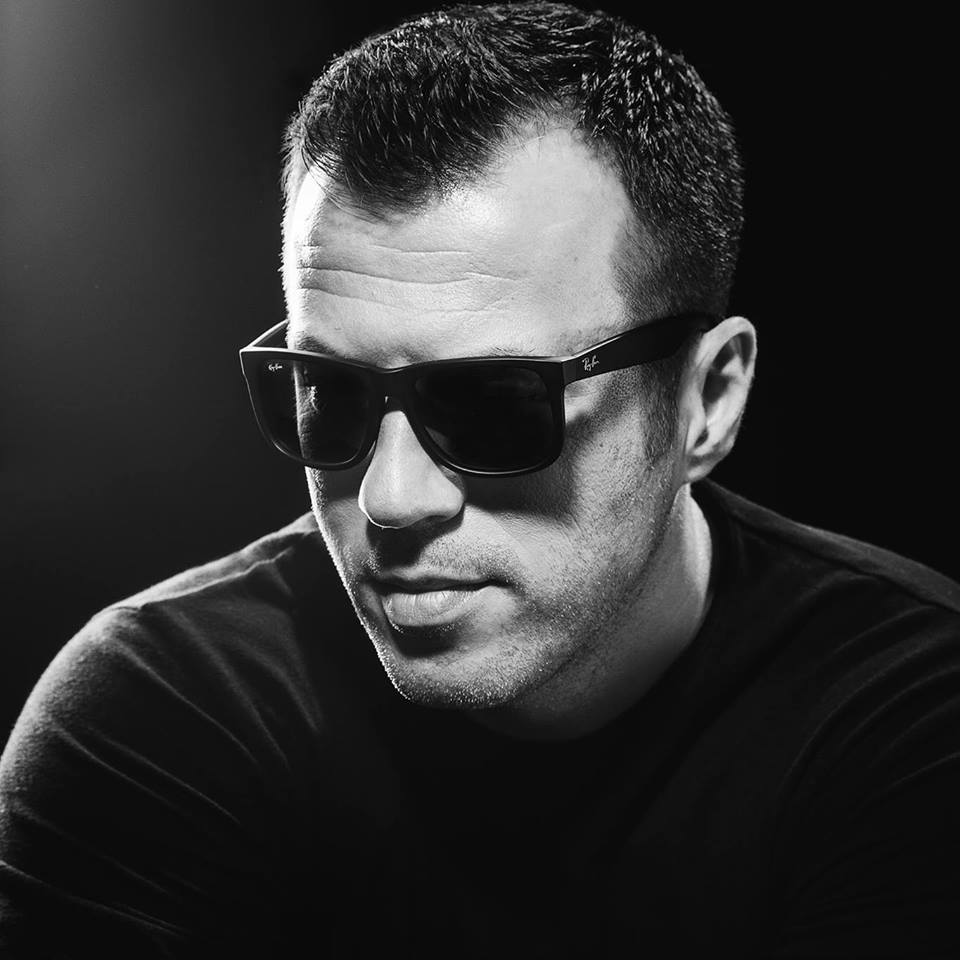

Background information
- Born: Budapest
- Origin: Hungary
- Genres: Techno
- Occupation(s): DJ, producer
- Years active: 2005-present
- Labels: Footwork
- Website: www.facebook.com/JayLumenMusic at Facebook

Jay Lumen (born March 1, 1981, in Budapest, Hungary) is the stage name of a Hungarian techno producer and DJ.

== Musical Career ==
He is the founder of Footwork Records, and has appeared on Drumcode, Second State, Saved, 100% Pure, Cadenza and Octopus Records. Lumen has collaborated with Green Velvet, Harvey Mckay, Gary beck, Popof, Wade, Sasha Carassi and Roberto Capuano. Lumen's music has been played on radio stations and podcasts in several countries including BBC Radio 1, Annie Mac, and Pete Tong's radio show.

For three consecutive years, from 2013 to 2015, Lumen won the award for Underground DJ Of The Year at the Ballantine's Music Awards. In 2014, he was ranked number 3 for most sales on Beatport in the tech-house category, and number 10 in techno. In 2015 he was number 3 on Beatport in the Techno category for the most sales. Lumen was listed on Beatport as number 2 highest sales in the techno category. In 2015, Lumen was polled at number 26 in Resident Advisor’s "DJ Charted" artist. In 2019 and 2020, Jay Lumen was polled at number 37 and 43 in DJ MAG’s Alternative Top 100 artist. In 2022, Lumen was polled at number 2 in beat port’s "10 Best-Selling Techno Artists". Number 4 in beat port’s "10 Most-Streamed Techno Artists".

Jay Lumen has performed at clubs and festivals including Space (Ibiza nightclub), BPM Festival, Club Space- Miami, Digital Dreams Music Festival, EL Row - Barcelona, Tresor, Sónar, Ministry of Sound, Amsterdam Dance Event, Detroit Electronic Music Festival Afterparty, Balaton Sound, and Mystic Garden in Amsterdam.

== Discography ==
Singles & EPs

- Orion (2022)
- "Voyager" (2021)
- "From Outer Space" (2021)
- "Dust" (2020)
- "Galactic Rainbow" (2020)
- "The Last Raver" (2020)
- "Raincarnation" (2020)
- "Robots" (2020)
- "Contact" (2020)
- "Generation" (2020)
- "Planet III" (2019)
- "Razor" (2019)
- "Hymn" (2019)
- "Rave Me" (2019)
- "Ozone" (2019)
- "Aurora" (2019)
- "Meteo" (2019)
- "Connected" (2018)
- "Stella Luce" (2018)
- "Trust" (2018)
- "The One" (2018)
- "Asteroid" (2018)
- "Balance" (2018)
- "Solar" (2018)
- "Inside" (2017)
- "Consciousness" (2017)
- "Rebirth" (2017)
- "Opus" (2017)
- "Lost Tales / Remix album (LP)" (2017)
- "Search" (2017)
- "Lost Tales (LP" (2016)
- Fusion (2016)
- Dirty Groove (with Wade) (2016)
- Octaves (with Roberto Capuano) (2016)
- Elysium (2015)
- Power Chords(with Harvey McKay) (2015)
- Enigma (2015)
- LondON (2015)
- Our Freedom (2015)
- Dusty Memories (2015)
- It's All About Me (with Green Velvet) (2014)

== Awards ==
- 'Underground DJ of The Year I Ballantine's Music Awards' (2015)
- 'Underground DJ of The Year I Ballantine's Music Awards' (2014)
