= Olivier Giacomotto =

French musician

Olivier Giacomotto (born 2 February 1976 in Bordeaux, France) is a French electronic music producer, composer, and disc jockey (DJ), also known as Superskank, Ohmme, or OG.

== Biography ==
=== Early career (1999–2003) ===
Giacomotto started his career in 1999, entering the world of production by working in recording studios, where he learned the use of samplers, mixing desks, effects, computers and music software. From Blues Café studio in Paris to Townhouse Studios in London, he worked with Robert Suhas, Magnus Fiennes, Guy Pratt, Yohad Nevo, Pete Lewis, John Themis, and various other bands, producers, studio musicians and sound engineers.

After moving back to Bordeaux, he programmed break-beat, drum'n'bass, trip-hop, hip-hop, lounge, and ambient music in electronic projects such as Shagshag, Dubweisers and Uprock Massive. In 2002, with Shagshag, he won a remix contest organized by News magazine and had his first vinyl release: Plastyc Buddha – Rhodes Royce (Shagshag Remix).

=== International breakthrough (2004–2008) ===
His career took off in April 2004 with the release of his first EP Playground on the Belgian label Lupp, which was quickly picked up by DJs including Carl Cox and Chris Liebing. In 2006, he began his international touring career and joined Definitive Recordings, which he co-directed with John Acquaviva until 2016, serving as its main artist and A&R director.

Four of his tracks were licensed by Rockstar Games for the video game Midnight Club: Los Angeles: "Wasabi On Top", "Good", "Sofa King", and "Too Cool For Skool".

He also produced for reggae artist Terry Lynn, whose track Stone was licensed for the soundtrack of the Hollywood film Date Night (2010), starring Steve Carell, Tina Fey, and Mark Wahlberg. His co-production with Tom Frager, Give Me That Love, released on Universal, charted for two weeks in the French Top 50.

=== Beatport success (2009–2016) ===
Since 2006, tracks such as "Volta", "Gail In The O", "Guacamoli", and "I'll Be OK" regularly appeared in the Beatport Top 10 charts. Nominated at the Beatport Music Awards in the early 2010s, he became the best-selling Tech-House producer of the year on Beatport in 2015.

In 2016, he composed the full original soundtrack to the multi award-winning horror film The Red Man.

=== Post-Definitive era (2017–present) ===
Following the end of his tenure at Definitive Recordings, Giacomotto continued releasing on leading underground labels including Suara, Toolroom Trax, Einmusika Recordings, Yoshitoshi Recordings, Diynamic, Watergate Records, Truesoul, and Simulate Recordings.

In 2024, he co-produced Home with Kiko and David Guetta, released on Spinnin' Records, praised by specialist media for its refined melodic techno aesthetic. The collaboration continued in 2025 with After You (feat. FAANGS), with music composed by Olivier Giacomotto, David Guetta and Kiko, and lyrics written by Nathan Ferraro. The track earned Ferraro a nomination at the 2026 Juno Awards in the Songwriter of the Year category. In February 2026, the trio released Prayer, also on Spinnin' Records.

== Discography ==
=== Selected notable releases ===
Year	Title	Artist(s)	Label
2004	Playground	Olivier Giacomotto	Lupp
2007	Gail In The O	Olivier Giacomotto	Definitive Recordings
2008	Sofa King...Good	Acquaviva & Giacomotto	Definitive Recordings
2009	Guacamoli	Olivier Giacomotto	Definitive Recordings
2015	Postgalactic	Olivier Giacomotto	Noir Music
2024	Home	David Guetta, Kiko & Giacomotto	Spinnin' Records
2025	After You (feat. FAANGS)	David Guetta, Kiko & Giacomotto	Spinnin' Records
2026	Prayer	David Guetta, Kiko & Giacomotto	Spinnin' Records

=== Film soundtracks ===
- The Red Man (2016) — full original soundtrack

=== Video game soundtracks ===
- Midnight Club: Los Angeles (2008, Rockstar Games) — "Wasabi On Top", "Good", "Sofa King", "Too Cool For Skool"
