= Digital Dreams Music Festival =

Electronic music festival held in Toronto, Ontario, Canada

Digital Dreams Music Festival is a two-day electronic music festival held in Toronto, Ontario, Canada, at RBC Echo Beach at Ontario Place. The festival has four stages and has around 25,000 attenders over two days. It has been rebranded to Bud Light Dreams Festival.

== History ==
The festival began in 2012 on June 30 – July 1. It is held annually in July, about the time of the Canada Day long weekend. It was the first outdoor electronic music festival in downtown Toronto and had much success. The festival quickly gained prominence in the EDM community, attracting music enthusiasts from across the globe. In 2012, the festival began with four stages: the Digital Stage, the Dream Stage, the Bass Stage and the Canada Stage. The 2013 festival followed this same set-up.

The festival operates with the support of corporate sponsorship.
