= DJ Misjah =

- Also known as: AMbassador, Dyewitness
- Born: Mischa van der Heiden; 1 September 1971 (age 54); Rotterdam, Netherlands
- Occupations: DJ, music producer, composer, record label and booking agency owner, mastering engineer
- Years active: 1989–present

Mischa van der Heiden (born 1 September 1971, Rotterdam), commonly known by his stage name DJ Misjah, is a Dutch DJ.

== Career ==
In 1995, he produced "Access" which would be featured along with the Warp Brothers, MDM, and several others on the album, Radikal Techno 6. The track reached No. 16 in the UK Singles Chart in March 1996, and reappeared in a remix version in May 2000, when it peaked at No. 45.

He also made remixes for Josh Wink, Jam & Spoon, Reflect, Format One, Finitribe, Next Door But One, George le Nagelaux and Denki Groove.

== Other sources ==
- Leave It to Misjah @ Proquest.com
- Misjah packs in techno muscle @ Proquest.com
- Blast From the Past: Ten ‘90s Club Bangers for Throwback Thursday @ Billboard.com
