= Basic Beat Recordings =

Dutch independent dance record label

Basic Beat Recordings is an independent dance record label from Rotterdam in the Netherlands.

The label was founded by Ron Hofland and his then business partner Ronald Molendijk and started releasing records in the early 1990s. Artists such as DJ Tiësto and Ferry Corsten released a number of early records on labels associated with this company before finding international fame, whilst Hugo Zentveld and Aldwin Oomen of Nightbreed and Angel City, have released a number of records by their production projects on sublabels such as Guardian Angel. The label operated a physical record store in the Netherlands until 2007.

== Affiliated labels ==
- 303F Records
- B-House Records
- Basic Energy
- Buckle Up Records
- Denz Da Denz Recordings
- Guardian Angel
- Manual Music
- Search Records
- Straddle Up Music
- Technique Records
- Trashcan Records

== See also ==
- List of record labels
