= Commander Tom =

German DJ and record producer (1962–2022)

Tom Weyer (29 August 1962 – 9 June 2022), better known by his stage name Commander Tom, was a German DJ and record producer.

== Career ==
He began working as a DJ at the "Drops SuperDisco" in Kehl, Baden-Württemberg, in the 1980s, and also worked as a DJ at the "Rheinpark" discothèque in Germersheim, Rhineland-Palatinate, in the 1990s.

In 2004, his single "Attention!", sampled from the Tom Novy vs. Eniac 1997 song "Superstar", hit #1 on the German dance music charts. It peaked at #23 in the UK Singles Chart in February 2005. A further single, "I Can't Sleep!", was released in 2006.

Commander Tom died on 9 June 2022, at the age of 59.
