= Bandulu =

British electronic and reggae music group

- Origin: London, England
- Genres: Electronic, techno, reggae, dub
- Labels: Infonet Records, Blanco y Negro, Foundation Sound Works, Music Man Records
- Members: Jamie Bissmire; John O'Connell; Lucien Thompson

Bandulu are a British electronic and reggae music group consisting of Jamie Bissmire, John O'Connell and Lucien Thompson. The music often relies heavily on techno and dub elements. Releasing their first two albums on Creation Records sublabel Infonet, the group has also released albums on Blanco y Negro, Foundation Sound Works and Music Man Records. The group recorded three sessions for John Peel's BBC Radio 1 show.

The trio have also recorded under the names Thunderground, New Adult, Sons of the Subway, and Space DJz.

In his book Energy Flash, Simon Reynolds credited Bandulu as part of the "Texturology" subgenre, stating that "the best tracks on Bandulu's Guidance sounded like jazz-techno, as if Zawinul had somehow ended up band-leader of Tangerine Dream instead of Weather Report".

== Album discography ==
Album	Format	Label	Year
Guidance	2×LP, CD	Infonet	1993
Antimatters	2×LP, CD	Infonet	1994
Black Mass	2×12"	Foundation Sound Works	1996
Cornerstone	2×LP, CD	Blanco y Negro	1996
Repercussions	2×12"	Foundation Sound Works	1996
Bisness	2×12"	Foundation Sound Works	1997
New Foundation	CD	Foundation Sound Works	1997
Redemption	2×LP, CD	Music Man	2002

The CD and vinyl versions of Redemption contained mostly different tracks.
