= Christian Smith (DJ) =

Swedish disc jockey

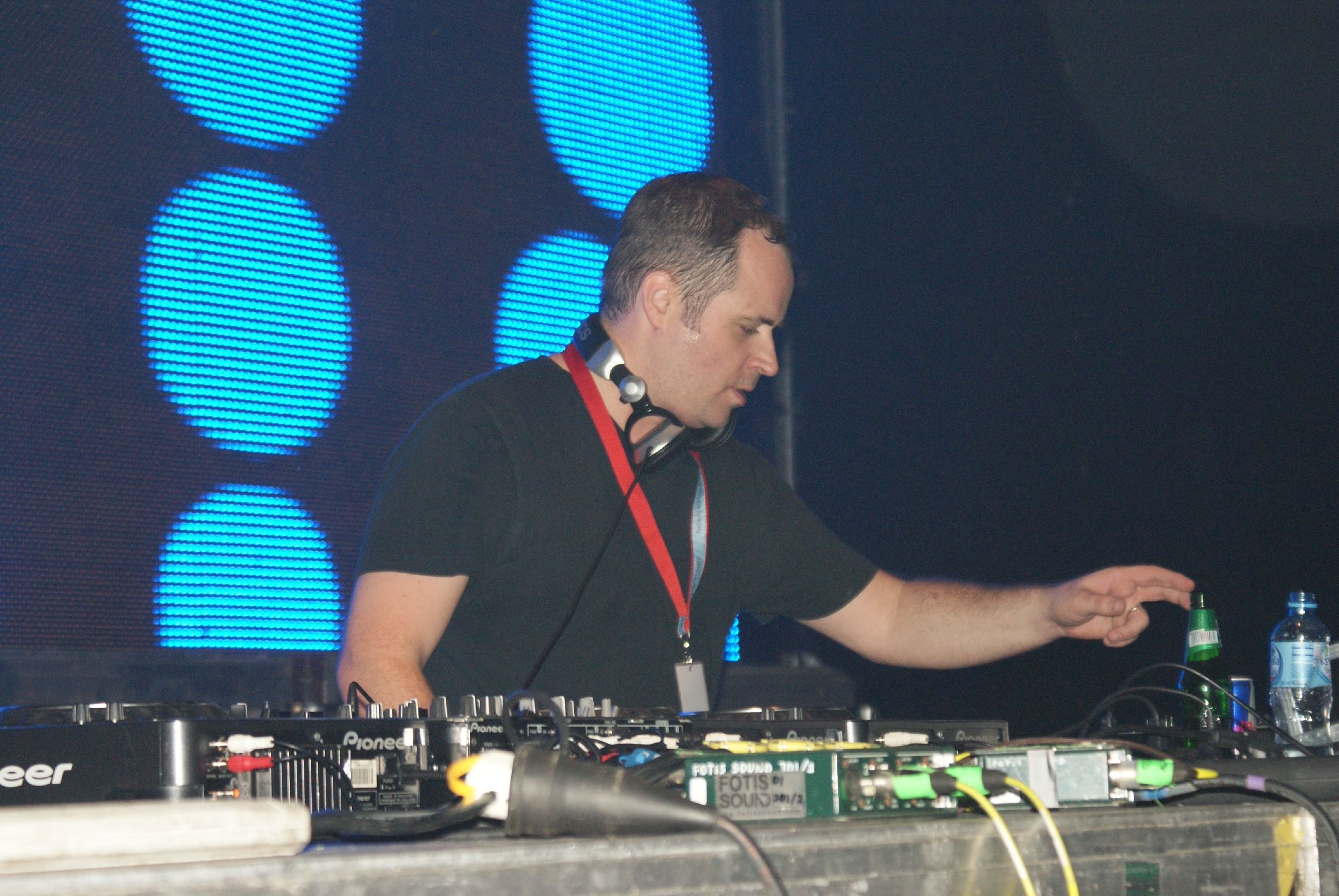
- Christian Smith (2010)
- Born: Christian Smith–Solbakken; Stockholm, Sweden
- Occupations: Disc jockey (DJ), record producer, record label founder

Christian Smith–Solbakken is a Swedish disc jockey (DJ), record producer and remixer. He has lived in Mallorca, and London.

== Life and career ==
Although he was born in Stockholm, Christian spent much of his youth in Frankfurt, Germany. His father worked as a pilot. In 1989 he moved to New York City and, 3 years later, to Washington D.C. where he started DJing in his spare time while studying at the local university.

In 1994, he founded the record label Tronic. He is also the founder of Tronic Radio, a weekly podcast now syndicated to over 100 stations around the globe with their 200th show was celebrated with special guest Adam Beyer.

In 2001, Smith released the album Tronic Treatment, which became the same name of a series of hosted DJ sessions in the early 2000s.

== Discography ==
- 2001, Tronic Treatment, Moonshine Music
- 2016, Input Output, Tronic Label
