= Stefano Noferini =

Italian DJ and producer

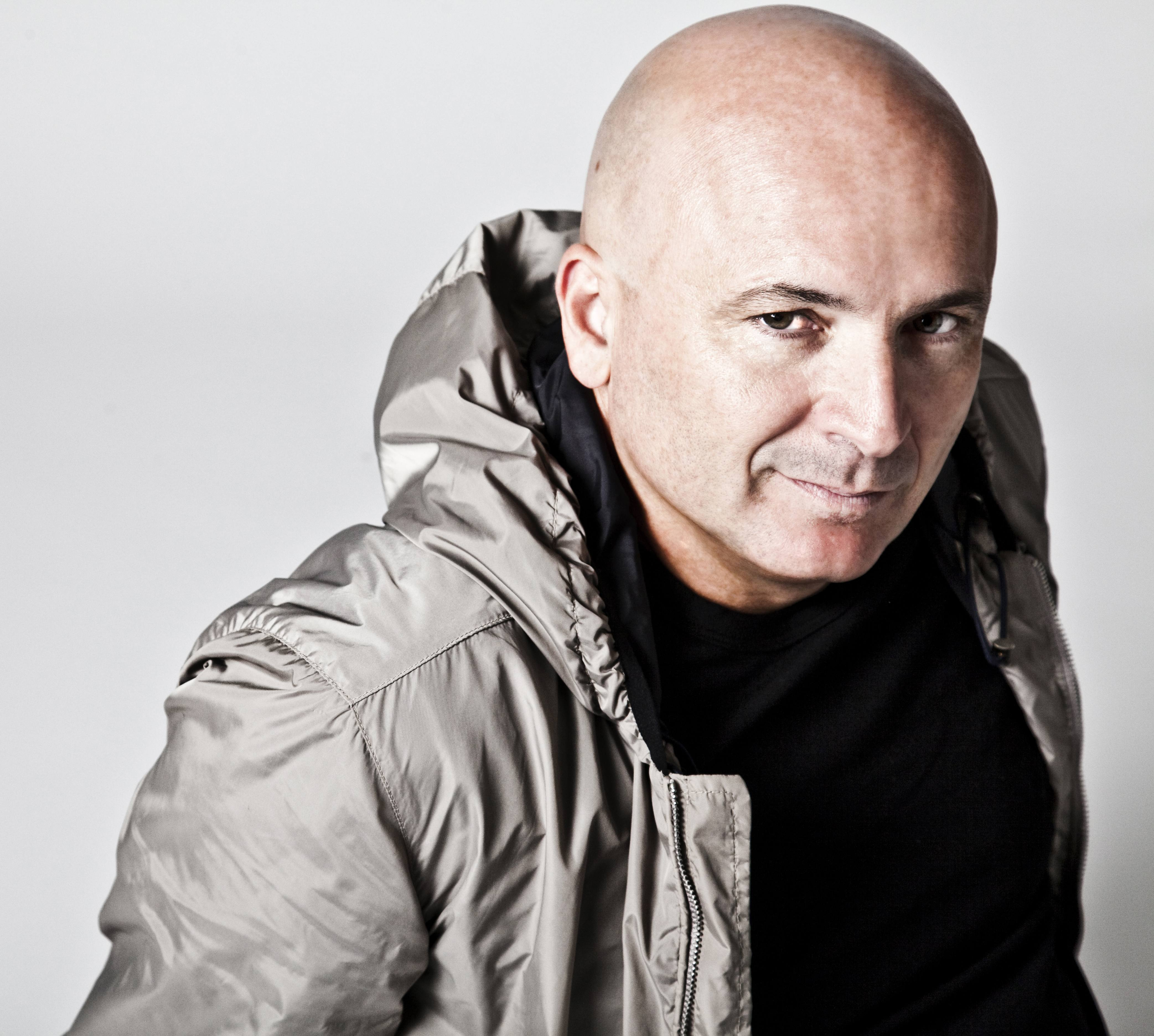
- Italian tech - tech house dj producer

Background information
- Origin: Florence, Italy
- Genres: Tech, Tech House
- Labels: Deeperfect, Toolroom Records, Spinnin' Records
- Website: http://www.stefanonoferini.it

Stefano Noferini (born 24 May 1961 in Florence, Italy) is an Italian tech and tech house DJ and producer.

== Biography ==
He began his career in the late 1970s in the clubs of his hometown, Florence. Then during the 1980s and the 1990s, he became resident dj at "Titilla", the prive of Cocoricò (Riccione) and Fitzcarraldo (Arezzo) and began playing all around Italy. In 1998 he took an Italian truck to the Love Parade in Berlin. Since the late 1990s his sound and his tracks become more and more popular and took him to release on perform all around the world in clubs as Ministry of Sound London, Space Miami, Space Ibiza, Pacha London, Cocoon Frankfurt, Row 14 and in festival as Ultra Music Festival and Mystic Garden in Amsterdam.

In 2010 Sylvia Tosun vs Noferini & Marini – "Push N Pull" reached #1 in Billboard Dance Club Songs. Later he received two prizes at Beatport Awards: in 2010 he was awarded; In 2011 “Artist of the Year”. In March 2013 at IDMA in Miami he received the “Best Minimal Techno Track” Award with Umek for their track “Goes On”, released on Deeperfect, Noferini's record Label.

Noferini founded Deeperfect in 2003. Deeperfect released more than 500 tracks by artists as Stefano Noferin himself, UMEK, Stephan Bodzin, Nicole Moudaber, Dj Chus, Mihalis Safras, Mr. Bizz, Hollen, Wally Lopez, Matte Blakk, Zoo Brazil Mladen Tomic, Raul Mezcolanza, Groovebox and many others. Club Edition, his radio show, is broadcast by 110 radio stations in 15 countries and has had more than million plays on SoundCloud. In May 2014 Dj Mag and Noferini organized a competition dedicated to young DJs.

== Selected discography ==
Singles

- Sylvia Tosun vs. Noferini & Marini – “Push N Pull (Sound4Group) 2009
- Umek & Stefano Noferini – Goes On (Deeperfect) 2012
- Mark Knight & Stefano Noferini – That Sound (Toolroom Records) 2013
- Stefano Noferini, The End (Spinnin’ Records) 2013

Remixes

- Masters At Work feat. India "To be in love"
- Kaya -“ My Good Is Real"
- Robbie Rivera “Fallin”
- Isaac Hayes "Theme from the Shaft"
- Mutiny UK feat. D-Empress "New Horizons"
- Love Inc. – "C'mon C'mon"
- Bigfellas – "Beautiful"

Compilations

- Toolroom Knights Mixed By Stefano Noferini 2012
- Stefano Noferini / Adrian Morrison / Marco Dionigi – Alter Ego (CD, Mixed) 1995
- Stefano Noferini – Club Edition Winter Session 2013

Albums

- Stefano Noferini – From Here To Moon 1995
- Stefano Noferini – Van 1997
