= Chris Liebing =

German DJ, music producer, and radio host

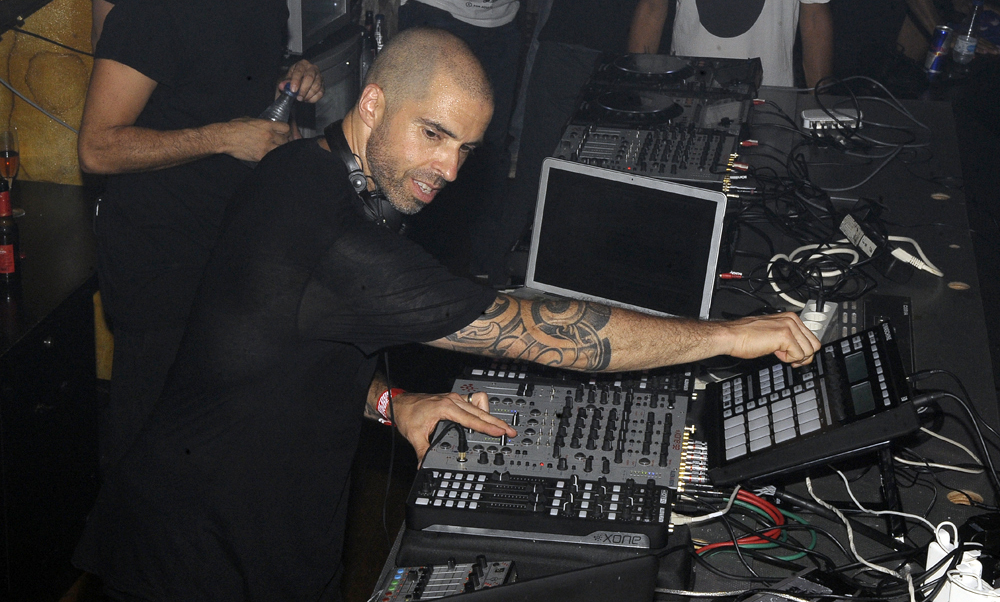
- Chris Liebing at Amnesia, 2012

Background information
- Born: Christopher Liebing; 11 December 1968 (age 57); Gießen, Hesse, West Germany
- Origin: Gießen, Hesse, Germany
- Genres: Techno, tech-house, minimal techno
- Years active: Early 1990s–present
- Labels: CLR, Fine Audio, Primate Recordings, WetYourself, Novamute
- Website: chrisliebing.com

Chris Liebing (born Christopher Liebing; 11 December 1968) is a German techno DJ, music producer and radio host and the founder of the record label CLR.

== Biography ==
Liebing was born in Gießen, Hesse. In the early 1990, he became active on the Frankfurt dance music scene. He opened the Spinclub techno club in 1994, and worked at Eye Q Records in Frankfurt. He formed his first label, 'Audio' in 1996, which was followed in 1999 by CLR.

In 2004, he released the philosophy-themed Evolution, which took two years to make. The album was described by CMJ New Music Report as "a techno album to go to war with".

In 2005, he worked with Speedy J on the Collabs 3000: Metalism album, released by Novamute. The album was described by Billboard as "one of the year's best collections of original electronic music".

In 2009, he launched the CLR Podcast, which was made available every Monday via iTunes and CLR's own website. The podcast was voiced by Liebing and featured guest mixes from a wide variety of techno DJs. Amongst the more notable guests was Depeche Mode's Martin Gore. The podcast ran weekly until 2015 when the 315th and final episode was broadcast. It was replaced by a new weekly podcast entitled am/fm, which features only mixes and live recordings by Chris Liebing himself.

Liebing has played at Space and Amnesia in Ibiza, Fabric in London, Berghain in Berlin, Cocoricò in Riccione and large festivals such as Time Warp. In 2018, Liebing launched his first album in eight years: Burn Slow on Mute Records. The album included vocal contributions from artists such as Gary Numan and Polly Scattergood. The album art was derived from a painting by Jan Brueghel the Younger.

Liebing became a vegan in 2011.

He created a new show called AM/FM in 2015.

In May 2023, Liebing did a remix for Depeche Mode's Ghosts Again.

In March 2025, he released his second original album "Burn Slow," which includes vocals by Gary Numan, Cold Cave, Polly Scattergood, Miles Cooper Seaton and Aleen.

== Discography ==
=== Albums / EP's ===
Year	Title	Label	Ref.
1999	Audio Compilation, Vol. 2	Fine Audio Recordings	
2003	Audio Labelcompilation, Vol. 1-2	Fine Audio Recordings	
2003	Evolution	CLR	
2004	U60311 Compilation: Techno Division, Vol...	U60311	
2005	Live in Beograd	CLR	
2005	Collabs 3000: Metalism	NovaMute	
2006	Live @ Womb Tokyo	CLR	
2007	Live in Zurich: Rohstofflager	CLR	
2008	Spinclub Ibiza, Season 2: The Complete C...	CLR	
2008	Live at Nature One 2008	CLR	
2010	10 Years CLR	Cloud 9 Holland / CLR	
2018	Burn Slow	Mute	
2021	Another Day	Mute	
2022	Another Night	Mute	
2023	I Will Be A Devil Until I Am An Angel (with Nicole Moudaber)	CLR	
2025	Burn SLow	Mute	
