= 1605 (record label) =

Slovenian record label

- Founded: 2007
- Founder: Umek
- Genre: Techno
- Country of origin: Slovenia
- Location: Ljubljana
- Official website: https://1605music.com/

1605 (pronounced as sixteen-o-five) is a techno and tech-house record label, founded in 2007 by Slovenian DJ and producer Umek. With 140 releases by more than 250 artists 1605 is the biggest label Umek has founded since Recycled Loops and Consumer Recreation. Umek started the label to promote tracks from talented artists, regardless of their fame and the strength of previous releases.

== Creative concept ==
The label's creative concept is based on its sound as well as on its visual appearance.

The 1605 sound relies on Umek's creative feeling as he acts as A&R manager and decides personally which tracks are signed by the label. Tracks are usually released digitally and sold online in various outlets such as Beatport, iTunes, Trackitdown, Juno and others. The only project, which was released also on a CD, was Umek's 2010 album Responding to Dynamic.

1605's music can also be heard on the label's podcast and on websites such as SoundCloud and Mixcloud.

The label is also building its recognition by using a distinctive graphic design for artwork (release covers, promo material). Using only artwork in grayscale with occasional yellow tones, all release covers feature parts of vintage pictures from the 1930s Great Depression in the US and personal drawings by the label's graphic designer Visual Brain Gravity.
