= John Acquaviva =

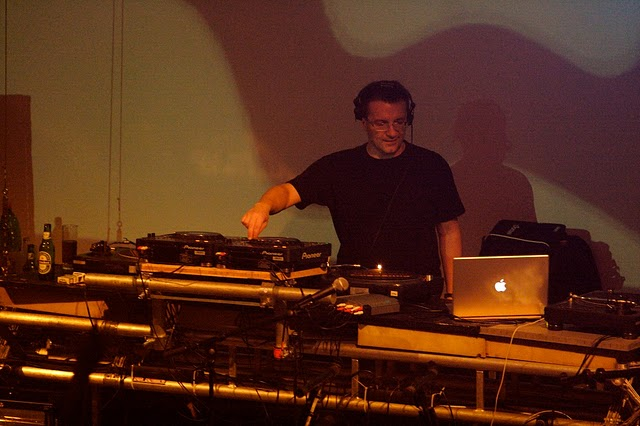
- Acquaviva in 2011

Background information
- Born: 19 November 1963 (age 62); Orsara di Puglia, Italy
- Genres: Techno, tech house, disco, house
- Occupations: Musician, disc jockey, musical entrepreneur
- Labels: Plus 8, Definitive Recordings
- Website: www.john-acquaviva.com

John Acquaviva (born 19 November 1963) is an Italian-Canadian DJ, producer, and musical entrepreneur.

== Music career ==
Acquaviva began his career in Detroit where he performed under the name of J'acquaviva+8. He met fellow DJ Richie Hawtin at The Shelter, (where Hawtin was mentored by Scott "Go-Go" Gordon) and the two tried unsuccessfully to catch the attention of labels like Transmat. In 1989, Acquaviva and Hawtin founded what would become one of the world's best known and influential techno labels, Plus 8 Records. The founding of Plus 8 Records put John Acquaviva and Richie Hawtin at the vanguard of the emerging international electronic music movement and DJ culture. In May 1990, they released the new label's first records, "Elements of Tone" and "We Shall Overcome".

In 1993, Acquaviva and Hawtin also founded Definitive Recordings. Acquaviva was one of the first people to take notice and embrace electronic music's digital future at the dawn of 2000 by championing Final Scratch. And following that success, Acquaviva took another step to help found and launch Beatport.com, the largest dance-music download site in the world.

Acquaviva currently runs Definitive Recordings, a label that he began in 1993 with Richie Hawtin and Karl Kowalski. After the label's hiatus in the late 1990s, Acquaviva relaunched Definitive Recordings in 2005 with an entertainment attorney, Mark Quail. Since then, the label has carved out a name with its distinctive tech house sound and six number one tunes on Beatport.com.

Not satisfied with just his own work, Acquaviva started fostering new artists for his Definitive label, DJ and producers such as Olivier Giacomotto, Simon Doty, Damon Jee, DJ Tonio, Jan Van Lier and Dan Diamon.

Having been on the international DJ circuit since the founding of Plus 8 in 1990 and on a perpetual world tour ever since, Acquaviva achieved his commercial pinnacle in 2006 when he reached number 22 on the DJ Mag 2006 list.

His international career has spanned well over two decades, throughout thousands of parties with millions of people having heard him play, keeping him in high demand. Acquaviva has had, both personally and with his label, six number ones and narrowly missed a seventh when his track "Sofa King", made together with Olivier Giacomotto, peaked at number two on the overall Beatport chart.

In December 2012, John Acquaviva released an official music video for the underground track "Good Music" made together with Alex D'elia, Nihil Young and the US based singer Dan Diamond.

== Number one Beatport entries ==
- John Acquaviva & Lutzenkirchen - "Zombie (Original Mix)" Blufin (2005)
- Olivier Giacomotto - "Gail In The O (Damon Jee & John Acquaviva Remix)" Definitive (2007)
- John Acquaviva presents Sven Webber - "First Stroke (Original Mix)" Great Stuff (2007)
- Robot Needs Oil - "Volta (Olivier Giacomotto remix)" Definitive (2008)
- Mantra - "Feedback With Madox (Original Mix)" Definitive (2009)
- Olivier Giacomotto - "Guacamoli (Original Mix)" Definitive (2009)
- Bass Kleph - "I'll Be Ok (Superskank Remix)" Definitive (2011)
- Robot Needs Oil - "Volta (Olivier Giacomotto remix)" Definitive (2008)
