= Unlike a Virgin =

Unlike a Virgin may refer to:

- Unlike a Virgin (album), a 1999 album by Silence
- Unlike a Virgin (Entourage), an episode of the TV series Entourage

== See also ==
- Like a Virgin (disambiguation)
