= Ambasada Gavioli =

Coordinates: 45°32′5.85″N 13°40′6.08″E

- Company type: Private
- Industry: Music
- Founded: 1995 -
- Headquarters: Izola, Slovenia
- Key people: Gianni Gavioli (architect)
- Website: www.ambasadagavioli.si

Ambasada Gavioli was a nightclub in Izola, Slovenia named after its architect Gianni Gavioli. It had a floor space of 1,600 m2 and a capacity of 2,500 guests. The club closed in 2021 after being sold to the Koper-based company Ensol 360 for 1,950,000 euros

== Appearance ==
The project is inspired from literature, theatre, cinema and fashion. Some themes include Italian baroque with Juliet's balcony and Charles Baudelaire's The Flowers of Evil. The architecture of the club is divided in two floors: wider main room and smaller, more intimate privee', which are connected with a glass wall, that allow visual and programming contact of rooms. The Ambasada Gavioli uses materials like wood, white stone and copper, combined in a Mediterranean style.

== Music ==
The music of Ambasada Gavioli is based on a combination of several modern directions in club music such as clubbing techno and modern house. The music is played by international DJs residents and other artists including Supa DJ Dmitry (from Deee-Lite), Tiësto (Netherlands), Sven Väth (Frankfurt), Laurent Garnier (Paris), Richie Hawtin (Canada), Takkyū Ishino (Tokyo), Westbam (Berlin), Boris Dlugosch (Germany), David Morales (USA), and DJ Umek.

== History ==
In the early 1990s a group of young Slovenian businessmen, operating under the name of Evolution Inc., decided to sell all their business assets, get international loans, and invest in what was anticipated to become a trans-national chain of dance entertainment complexes of the future. As opposed to other similar projects in the world at the time, this one was approached heavily from a cultural point of view rather than purely commercial. A well-known Italian architect — maestro Gianni Gavioli — was invited to collaborate on the development. Before the first sketches were laid down, the architect spent over a month in Slovene Istria, learning about its culture, architecture and legends while meeting with locals from many generations.

In 1994 works began on what developed to be the maestro's life masterpiece, combining the feel of local cultures with stories of Charles Baudelaire, Lewis Carroll's Alice's Adventures in Wonderland and William Shakespeare's Romeo and Juliet. Due to its significance, the IRWIN artist group, part of Neue Slowenische Kunst movement, suggested the name of the new venue to be Ambasada Gavioli (Embassy of Gavioli). It opened in December 1995.

Despite the initial optimism, based on rapid development of independent Slovenia as an emerging cultural and economic power in the region, as well as on the overall faith in positive future emerging from the global Rave movement, the venue did not attract as large an audience as expected from the start. 1996 was a year of initial struggle for Ambasada Gavioli.

Hard work and structural reorganization eventually started to attract the attention of cultural circles, national and international media, and ever-wider audiences, resulting in Ambasada Gavioli being recognised as one of the world's top 10 most prestigious and trendy electronic music venues in 1997 and one of the top clubbing destinations in Southern Europe.

== Ideological structure ==
Ambasada Gavioli has been operating according to the neuropolitan teachings of part-time prophet and revolutionary Chiron Morpheus. He proclaimed AG as the cathedral of avant-pop and a portal to elusive territory of the revolutionary haven of a pirate utopia or a temporary autonomous zone. He practised neuromancy, divination in the form of graphic koans. The AG management used to receive weekly ideological feeds from Chiron Morpheus, which were used as flyers and repurposed in the club's programming by Valentino Kanzyani’s AG Music Direction department, MC Flasher’s AG Performance & Outreach division, Denis Papic's AG Ministry of Information.

In 1998, the IRWIN group introduced the official flag of Ambasada Gavioli as a visual manifestation of its temporary state ideology. The flag consisted of a golden and black field with five stars in a circle — two black stars on golden background, two golden stars on black background and a star of opposite colours connecting both fields.

From the second half of 1999, the ideological aspect of Ambasada Gavioli has mostly been maintained by MC Flasher, which after his Canadian relocation in 2000 evolved into the Final Flash series and the division morphed into the Final Flash Association.

Through the years, the territory and/or the venue of Ambasada Gavioli has been regarded as Embassy of 3rd Europe, The Cathedral of Luxurious Colours (also “Ambassada dei mille colori” in Italian).

Since 2005, the ideological aspect of Ambasada Gavioli has mostly been abandoned, bringing it closer to a concept of a more commercial discotheque.

== Cult following ==
Since 1995 when it opened, Ambasada Gavioli has become the focal point of the electronic music community in Slovenia, Northern Italy, southern Austria and northwest Croatia, achieving almost a cult following appeal in the scene.

In the cultural context many people see the venue and the movement it created as a display of new cultural strength of the independent Slovenia. The club was intensely famed by the media due to its edgy provocative image, which has been carefully maintained by its Public Relations department, further reinforcing its futuristic cult-like appeal.

== Ownership and management ==
Originally owned and managed by a share-holders corporation, Evolution Inc., the management of the club was later occasionally shifted to the Final Flash Association for the Final Flash festival and to Ultimed Music business partnership on a full-time lease since 2005. Evolution Inc. remained the sole legal owner of the property. In August 2008 a part of the club's premises was sold to Slovenian biggest merchandising company Mercator. The club continued to host events until December 31, 2008. After that the destiny of Ambasada Gavioli remained unknown.

In 2010 Fetch The Vibe organisation re-opened Ambasada Gavioli in a glorious manner with an oldies-goldies party, featuring two of Ambasada's first and most famous ambassadors: DJ Umek and Valentino Kanzyani. Maybe the future for Ambasada is looking brighter with the new management and the cult will evolve and continue.

On December 17, 2011, the day of the Ambasada Gavioli anniversary, the newspaper Delo and the management Fetch The Vibe stated that the New Year's Eve event on December 31, 2011 will be the second-last event followed by one in January or February 2012. Fetch The Vibe will not renew the contract and the club will be given to the organization Pink TV for the recording of some TV shows.

However, the Pink TV organisation did not sign the contract in the beginning of March as stated. The reason was probably of a financial nature and the initial protest of club's audience which couldn't accept the fact that after 16 years of electronic events the club's scene, for which it became known, will come to an end. Fetch The Vibe is now continuing with organisation of events in the club and the brand "Ambasada Gavioli" remains in their hands. However, the quantity of events remains low for a club. They still continuously guest leading artists from international electronic scene. For now, Ambasada Gavioli continues the trend from last two years.

== Controversy ==
Although the venue has attracted thousands of people weekly and hosted main events of festivals (such as Golden Drum European Advertising Festival and Final Flash International Art festival), it sparked a fair amount of controversy in the local community due to over-population problems caused by a high number of visitors, sometimes calling for the closing of the venue or imposing limitations to the free movement of visitors after the events.
