= Lower Carniola =

Traditional region of Slovenia

Coordinates: 45°52′00″N 14°59′00″E

- Traditional region
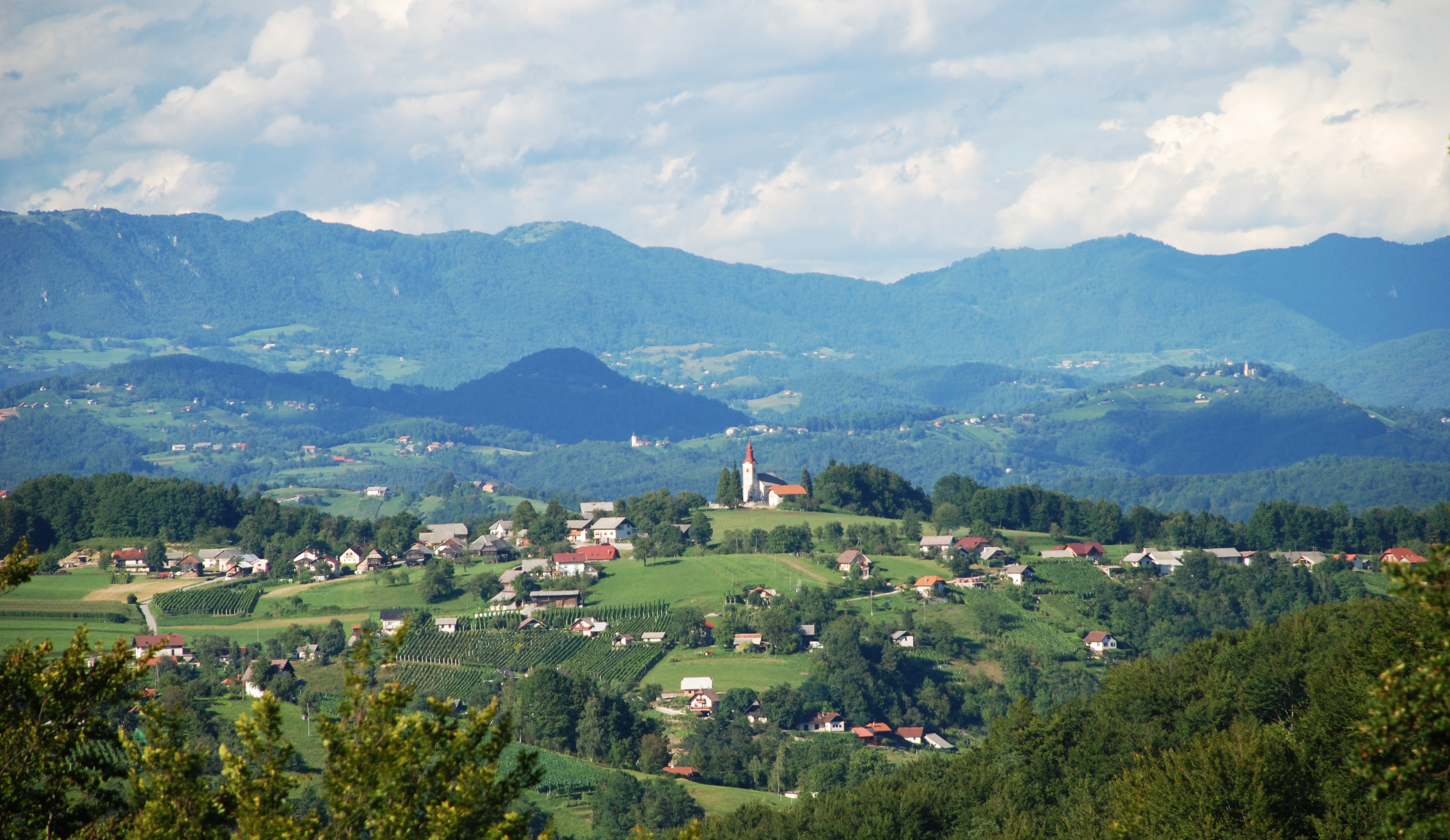
- Typical Lower Carniolan landscape in Sveti Vrh

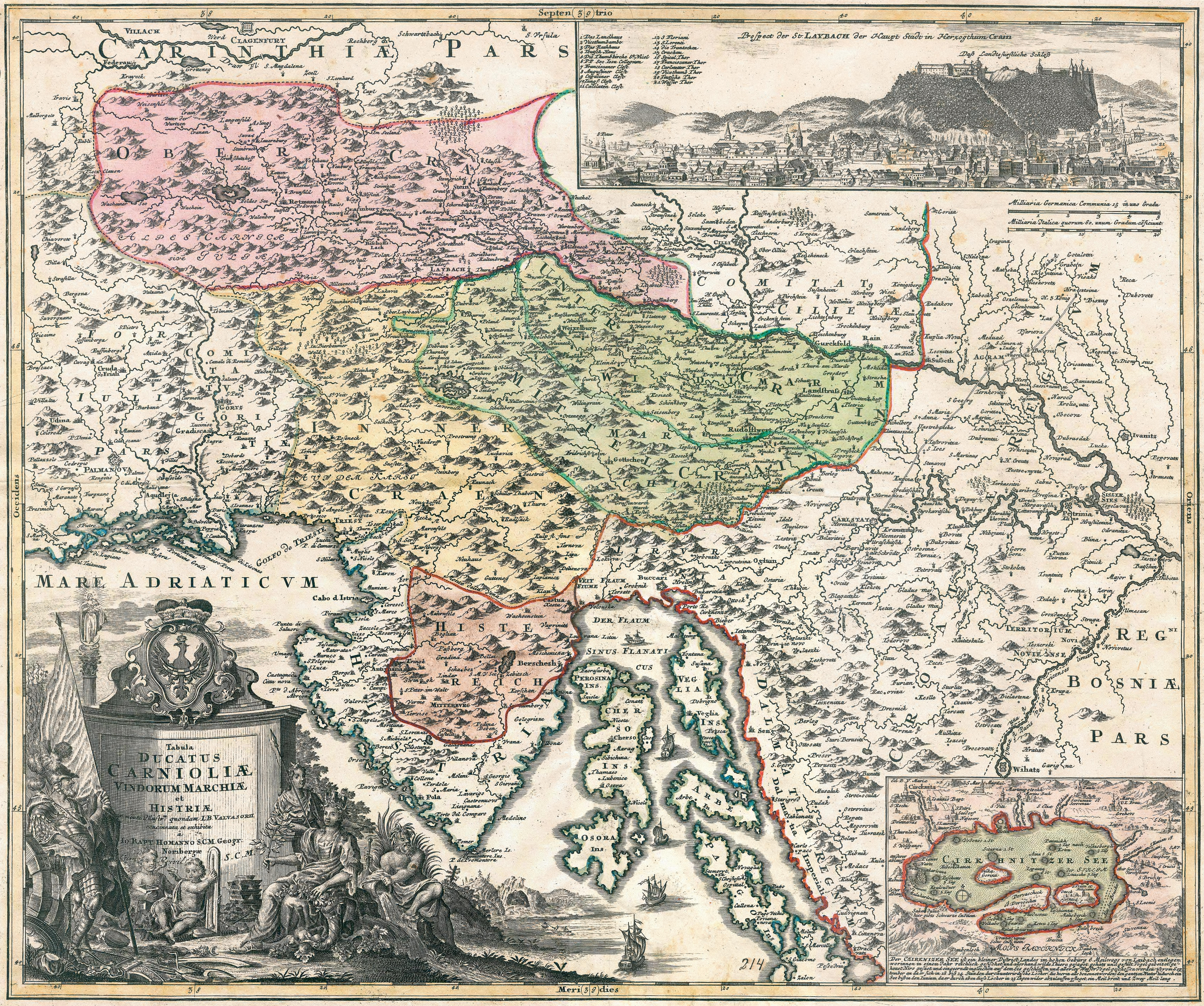
- 1714 map of Carniola by Johann Homann, Lower Carniola in green
- Country: Slovenia
- Elevation: 400 m (1,300 ft)
- Demonym: Lower Carniolan

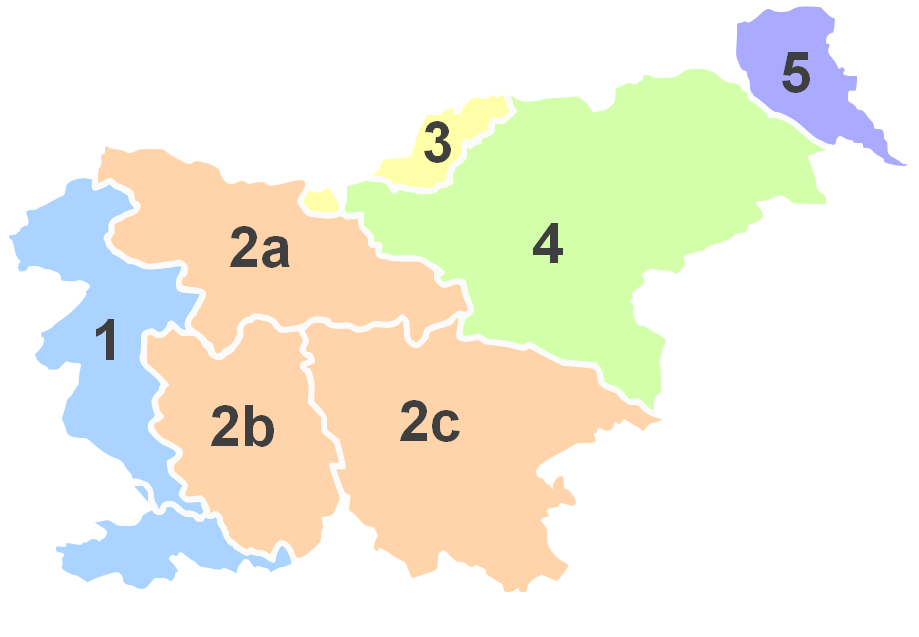
Traditional regions of Slovenia.: 1. Littoral; 2. Carniola: 2a Upper, 2b Inner, 2c Lower; 3. Carinthia; 4. Styria; 5. Prekmurje

Lower Carniola (Slovene: Dolenjska pronounced [dɔˈlèːnska]; German: Unterkrain) is a traditional region in Slovenia, the southeastern part of the historical Carniola region. Its largest town and urban center is Novo Mesto, with other urban centers including Kočevje, Grosuplje, Krško, Trebnje, and Ribnica.

== Geography ==
Lower Carniola is delineated by the Ljubljana Basin with the city of Ljubljana to the northwest, by the Kolpa River and the border with Croatia with the Gorjanci Mountains to the south and southeast, by the Sava River to the north and northeast, and by Mount Krim, the Bloke Plateau, and the Potok Plateau (Slovene: Potočanska planota) to the west. The southernmost region down to the border with Croatia on the Kolpa River is called White Carniola and usually considered part of Lower Carniola.

Within the Kočevje Rog karst plateau, the mountains reach an elevation of up to 1,099 m (3,606 ft). The historic centre of Lower Carniola is Novo Mesto, and other towns include Kočevje, Grosuplje, Krško, Trebnje, Mirna, Črnomelj, Semič, and Metlika.

== History ==
In the 17th century, the Habsburg duchy of Carniola was internally divided into three administrative districts. This division was thoroughly described by the scholar Johann Weikhard von Valvasor in his 1689 work The Glory of the Duchy of Carniola. The districts were known in German as Kreise (kresija in old Slovene). They were: Upper Carniola with its centre in Ljubljana (formerly Kranj), comprising the northern areas of the duchy; Inner Carniola comprising the southwest, with its centre in Postojna, and Lower Carniola in the southeast, roughly corresponding to the medieval Windic March of the Holy Roman Empire. While the bulk of the population spoke Slovene, the German-speaking exclave of the Gottschee Germans existed around Kočevje in the south.

This division remained, in various arrangements, up to the 1860s, when the old administrative districts were abolished and Lower Carniola was subdivided into the smaller Bezirke of Novo Mesto (Rudolfswert), Kočevje (Gottschee), and Krško (Gurkfeld). Nevertheless, the regional identity remained strong also thereafter. Upon the dissolution of Austria-Hungary after World War I, Carniola was incorporated first into the State of Slovenes, Croats and Serbs and then into the Kingdom of Serbs, Croats and Slovenes and it ceased to exist as a separate political and geographical unit. The Carniolan regional identity soon faded away, but the regional identification with its sub-units (Upper Carniola, Lower Carniola, and, to a lesser extent, Inner Carniola) remain strong.

Since the 1890s, Lower Carniola has become significantly more connected with the surrounding regions through the construction of the Ljubljana–Novo Mesto Railway (1894), Sevnica–Trebnje Railway (1908, 1938), and the Brotherhood and Unity Highway (1958) linking Ljubljana and Zagreb. In the early 21st century the Brotherhood and Unity Highway was replaced with the modern A2 motorway (completed in 2011).

== Culture ==
=== Language ===
The inhabitants of Lower Carniola speak several dialects that share common features and are classified within the Lower Carniolan dialect group.

In the 16th century, the Lower Carniolan Protestant reformer Primož Trubar, author of the first book printed in Slovene, helped establish the basis of what later developed into standard Slovene. His written language combined features of his native Lower Carniolan dialect with elements of the dialect spoken in Ljubljana.

=== Music ===
==== Folklore ====
Lower Carniola has had an important impact on Slovene folk music, with many great local musicians, the most notable being Lojze Slak.

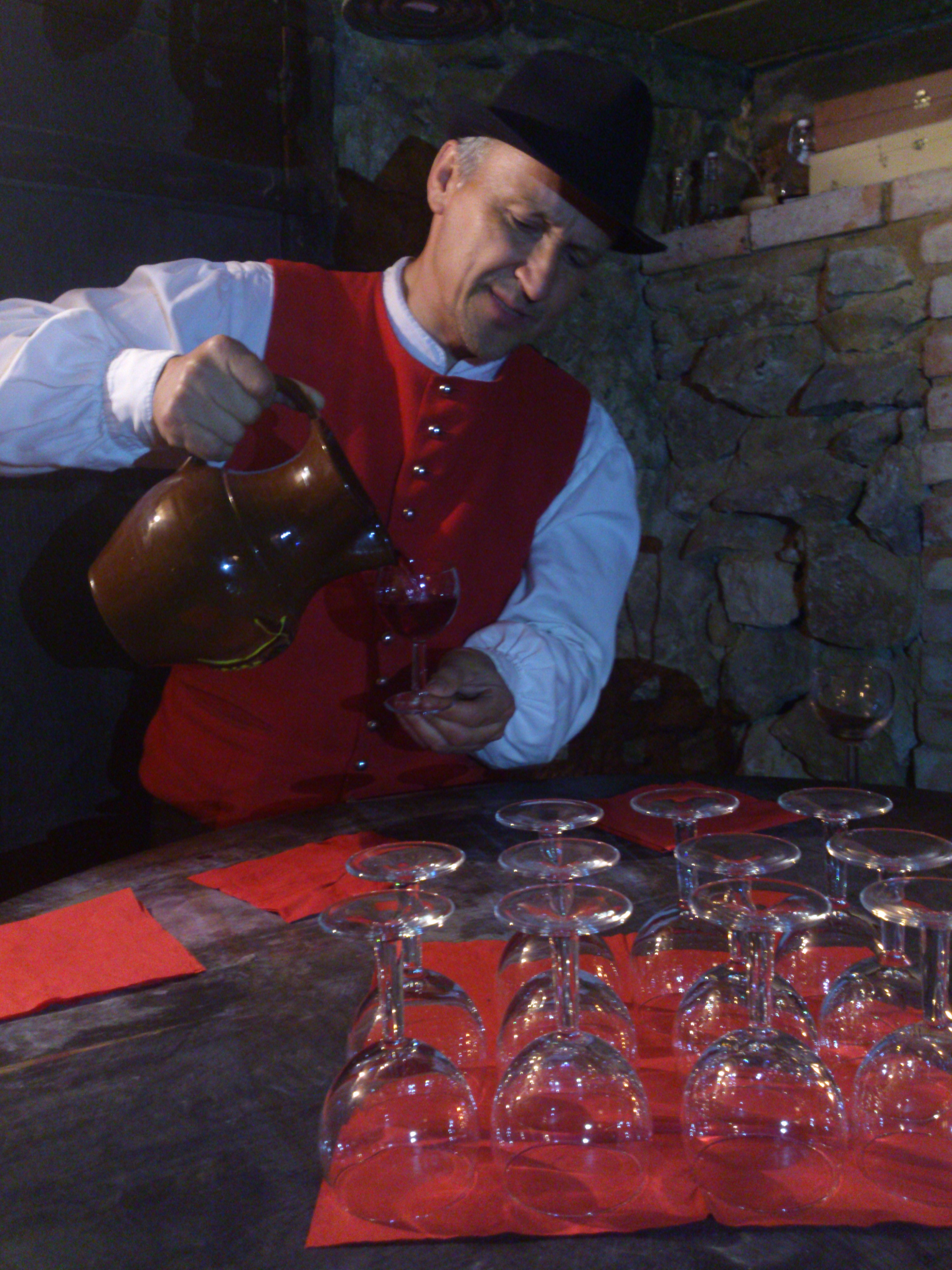
Lower Carniolan in folk costume pouring Cviček

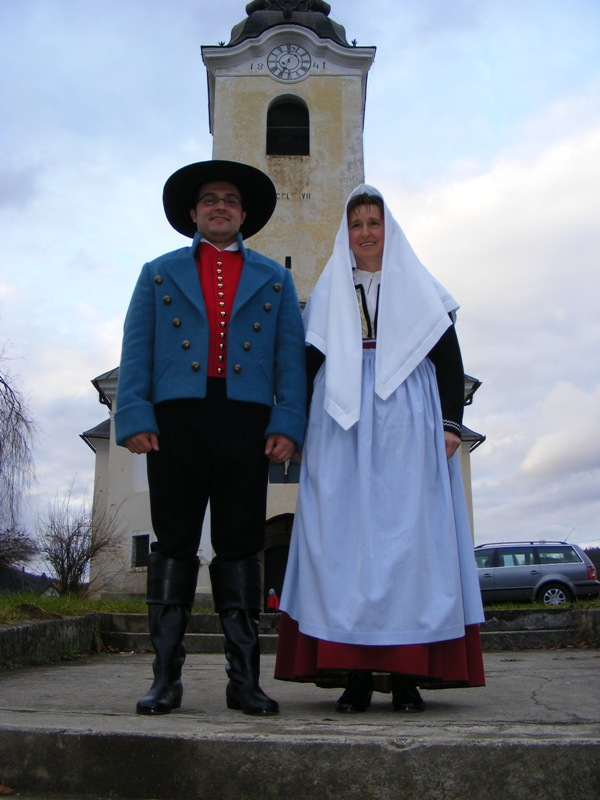
A variety of Lower Carniolan folk costume

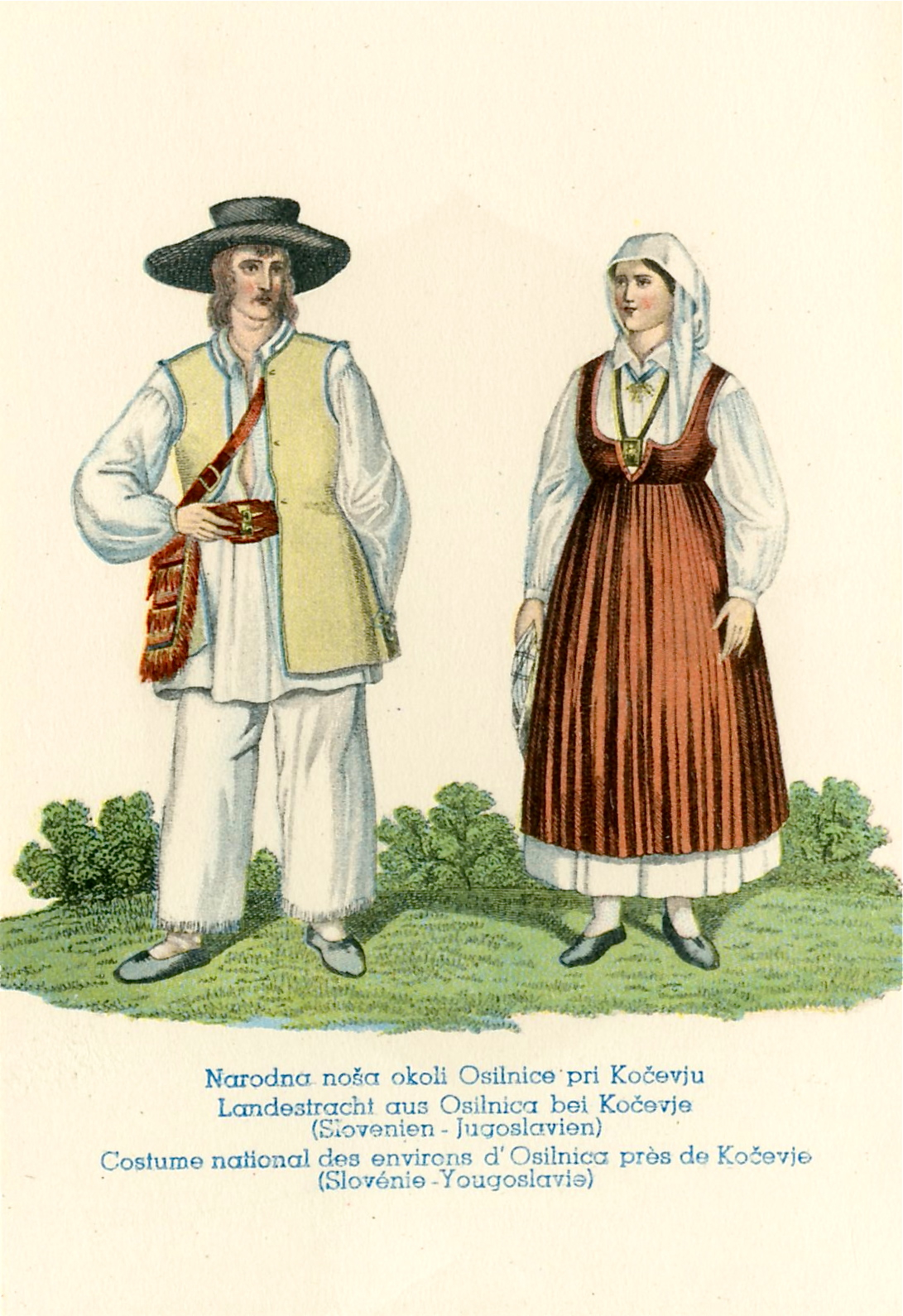
Folk costumes from Osilnica by Kočevje

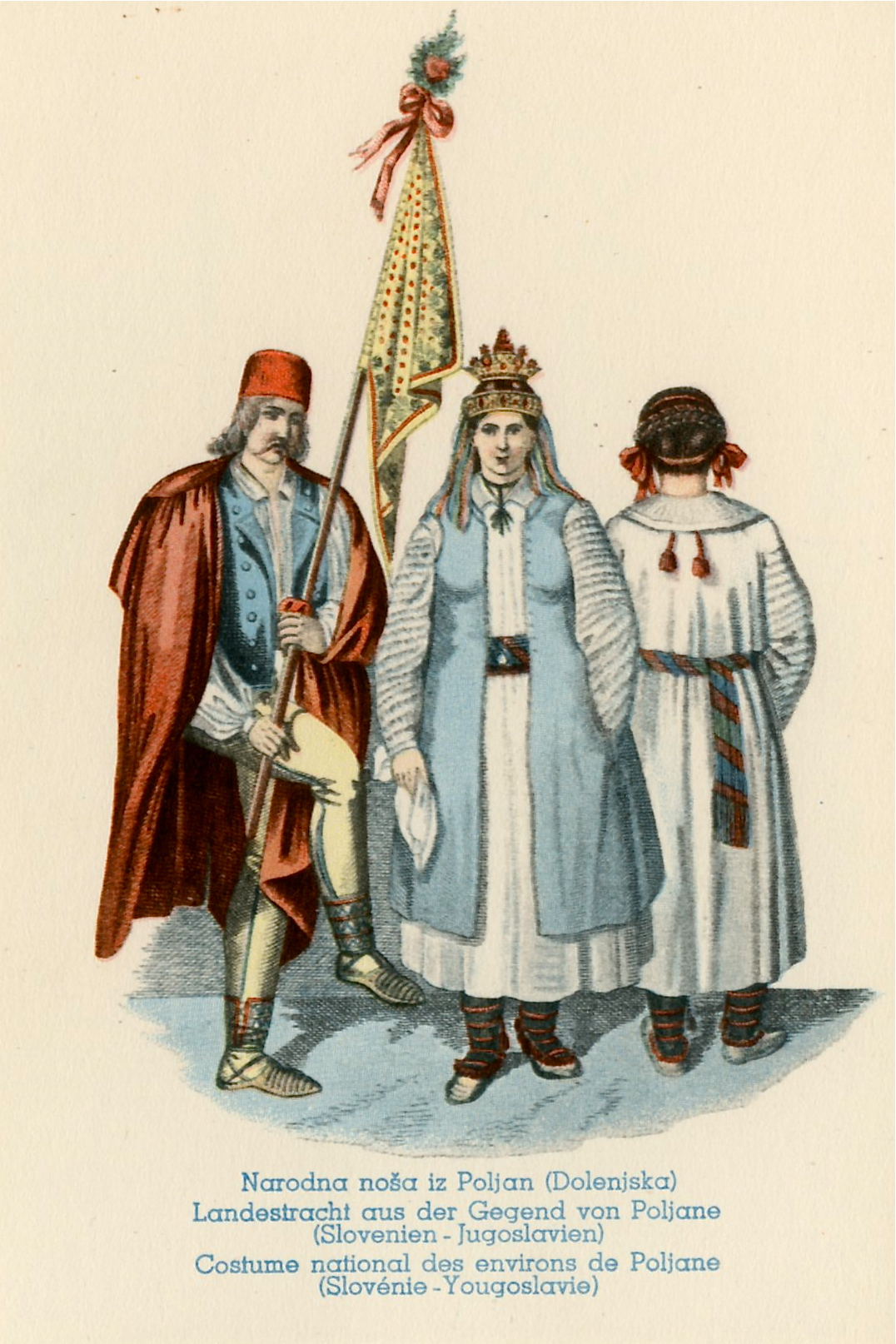
Folk costumes from Poljane

==== Musical events ====
Since 2013, Woodland Pristava, an annual electronic dance music festival, has been held in Pristava nad Stično.

=== Cuisine ===
Lower Carniola shares most of the common Slovene cuisine, with emphasis on grilled meat and local wine, such as Cviček. Some other regional dishes include matevž, mlinci, and belokranjska povitica.

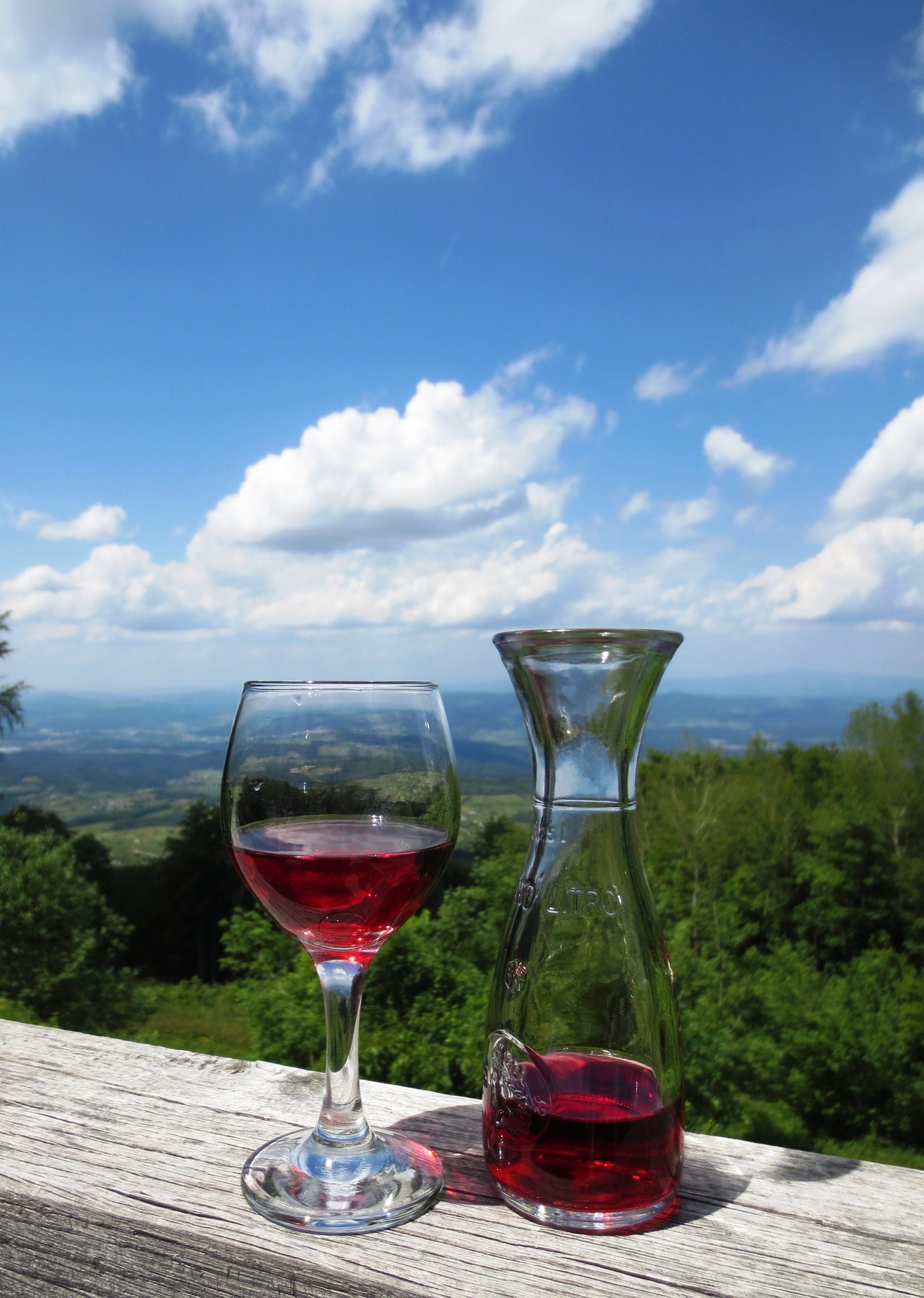
Cviček wine

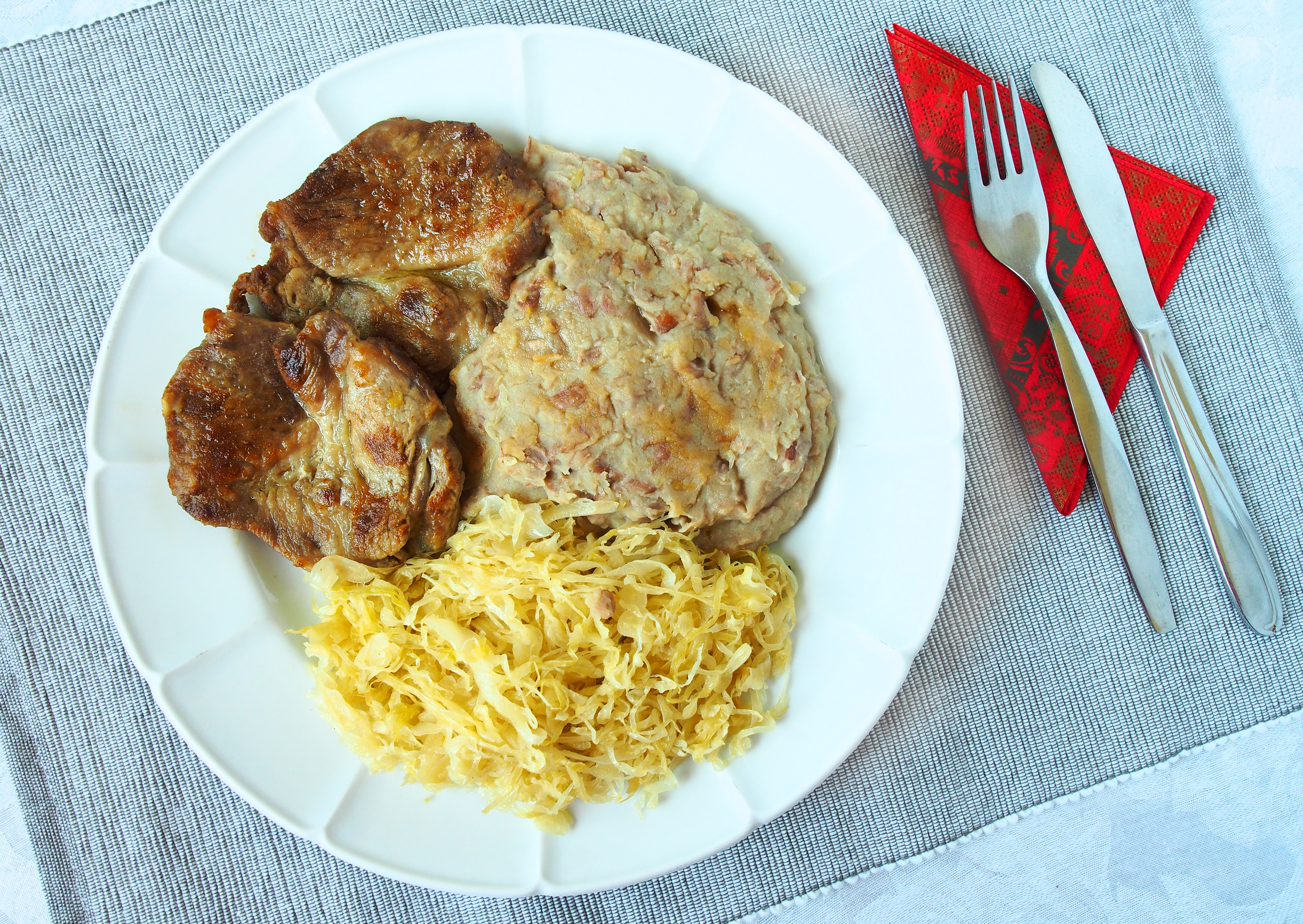
Plate with matevž as a side

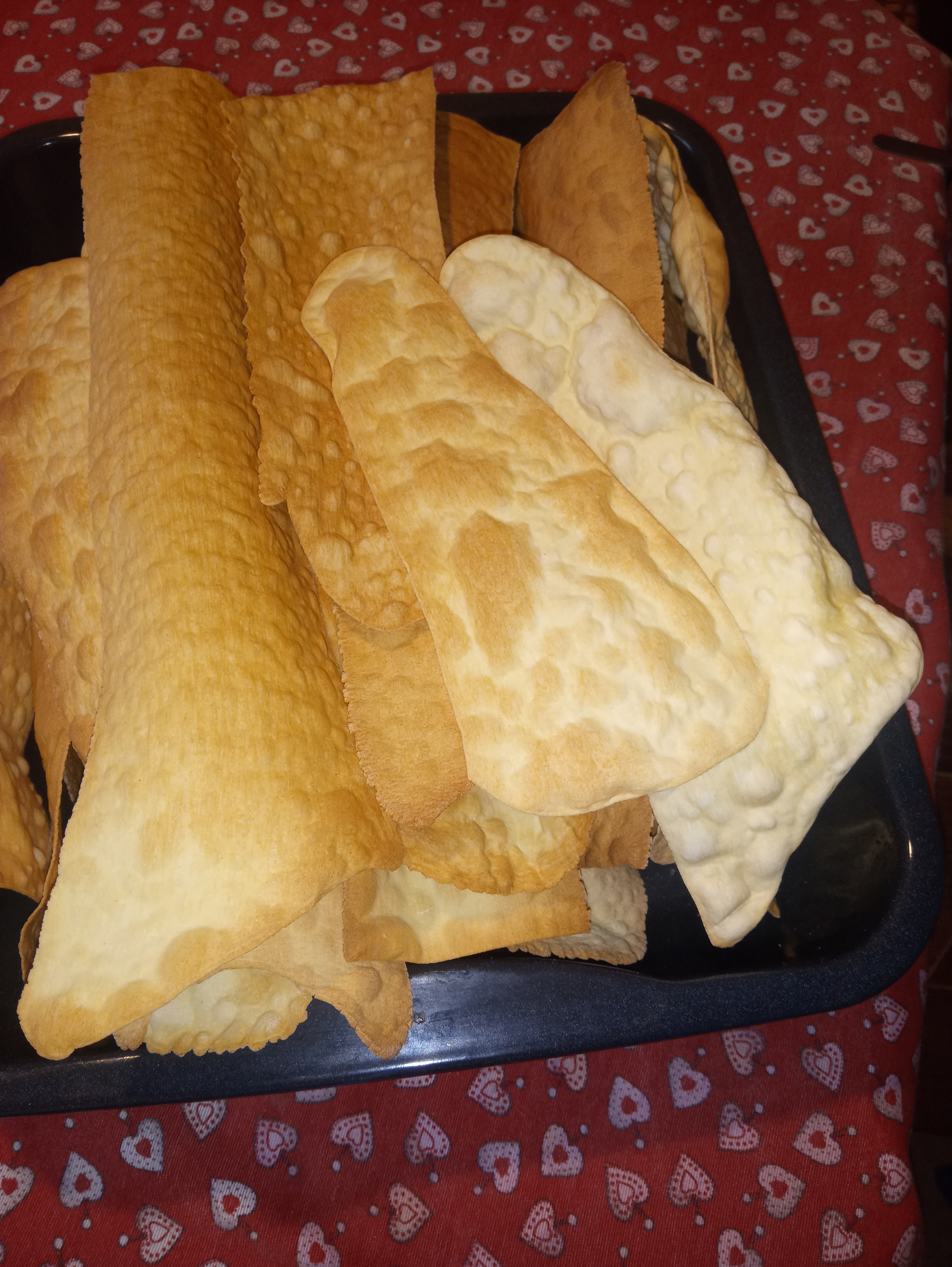
Dry mlinci

== Notable people ==
- Primož Trubar (1508–1586), writer of the first book in Slovene
- Jurij Dalmatin (1547–1589), writer and translator
- Jacobus Gallus (1550–1591), late-Renaissance composer
- Joannes Adamus Gaiger (1667–1722), philologist and lexicographer
- Peter Kosler (1824–1879), lawyer and cartographer
- Fran Levstik (1831–1887), writer
- Josip Stritar (1836–1923), writer
- Josip Jurčič (1844–1881), writer
- Minca Krkovič (1858–1933), Slovenian field laborer and folk singer
- Oton Župančič (1878–1949), poet
- Louis Adamic (1898–1951), writer
- Anton Podbevšek (1898–1981), poet
- Božidar Jakac (1899–1989), painter
- Leon Štukelj (1898–1999), athlete
- Tone Kralj (1900–1975), sculptor and painter
- Edvard Ravnikar (1907–1993), architect
- Bojan Adamič (1912–1995), composer
- Tone Pavček (1928–2011), poet
- Lojze Slak (1932–2011), pioneer of ensemble music
- Lojze Peterle (born 1948), politician
- Janez Janša (born 1958), former prime minister of Slovenia
- Nina Pušlar (born 1988), musician

== Image gallery ==
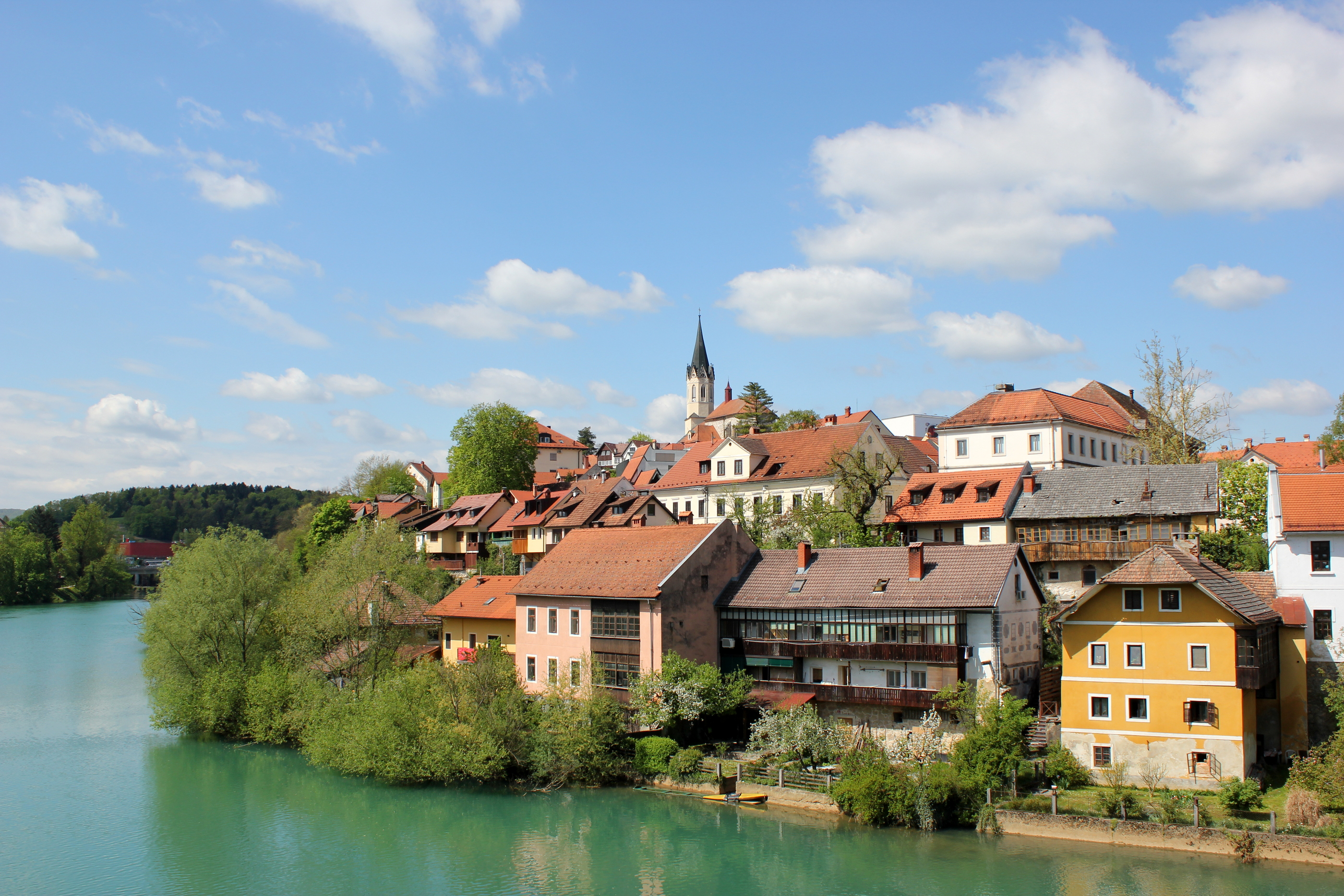
Novo Mesto

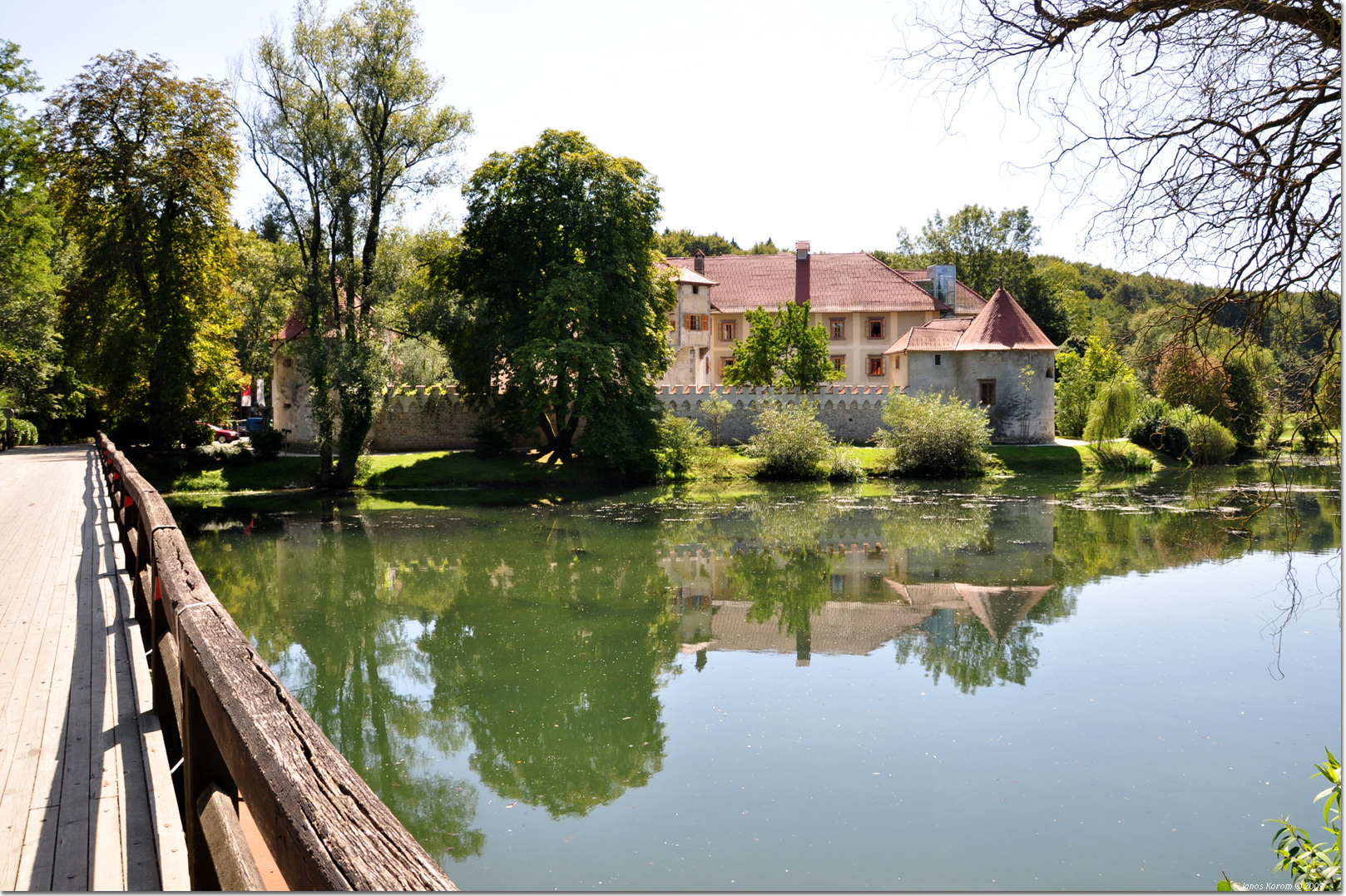
Otočec Castle

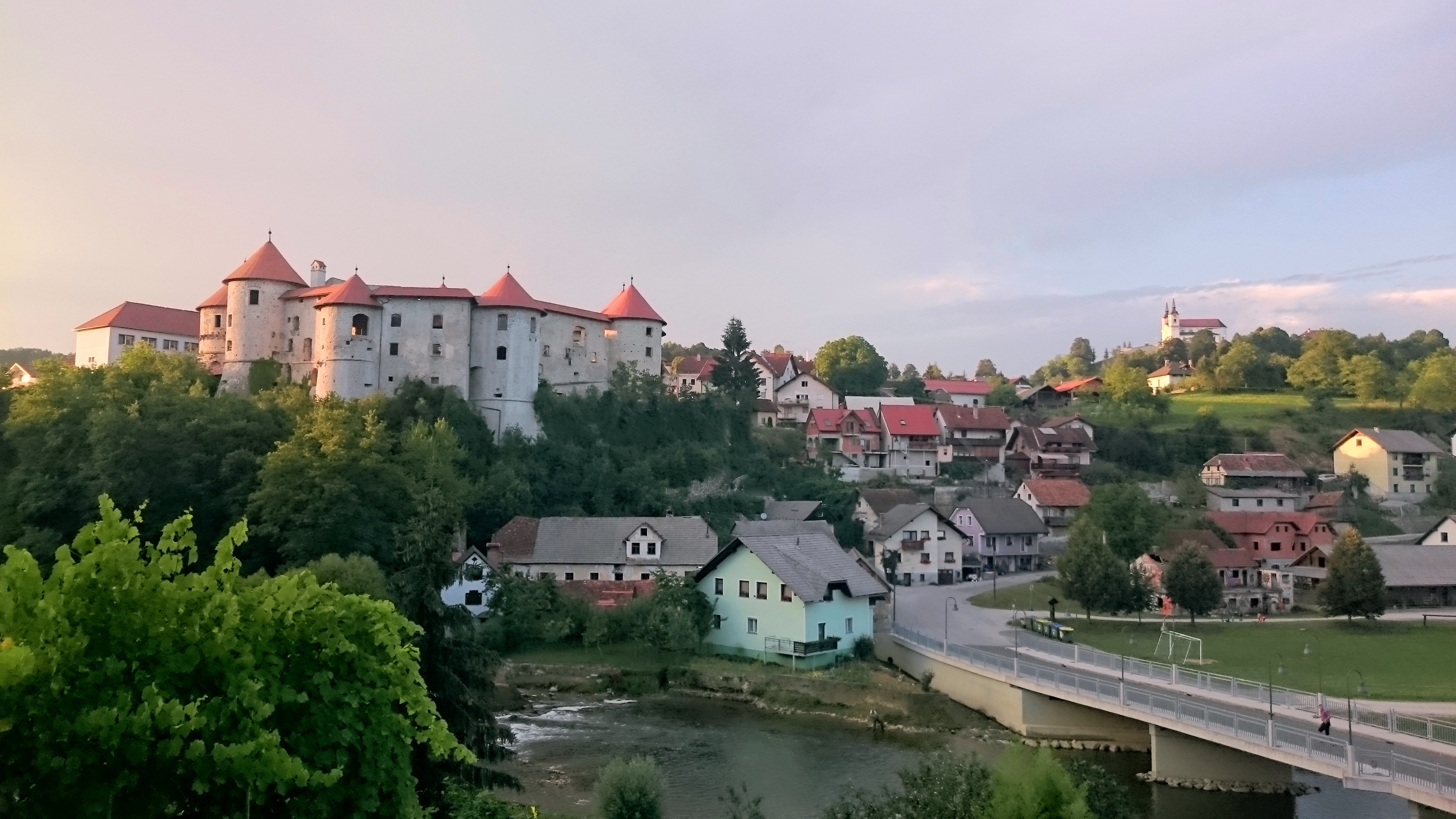
Žužemberk

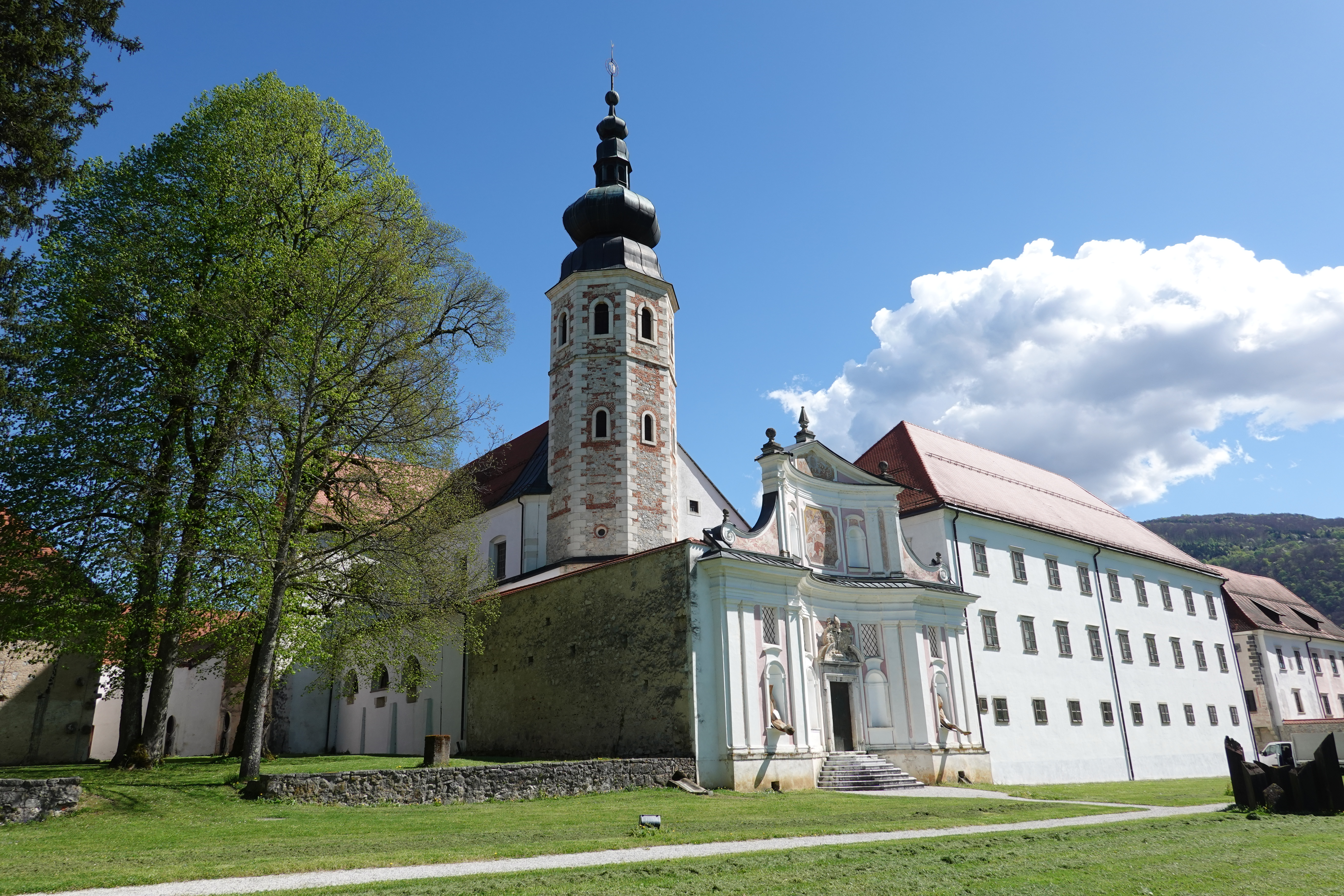
Kostanjevica na Krki Monastery

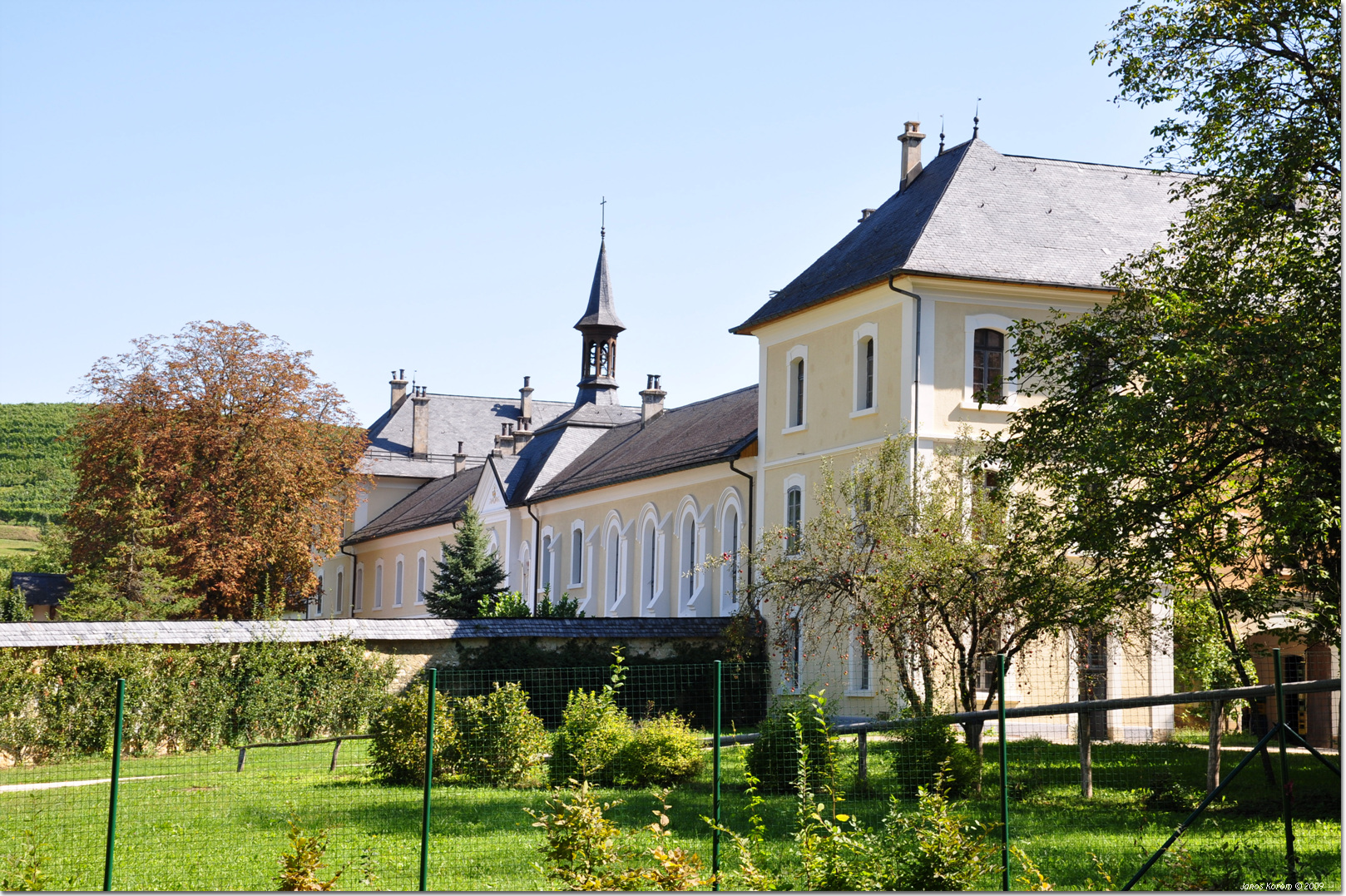
Pleterje Charterhouse

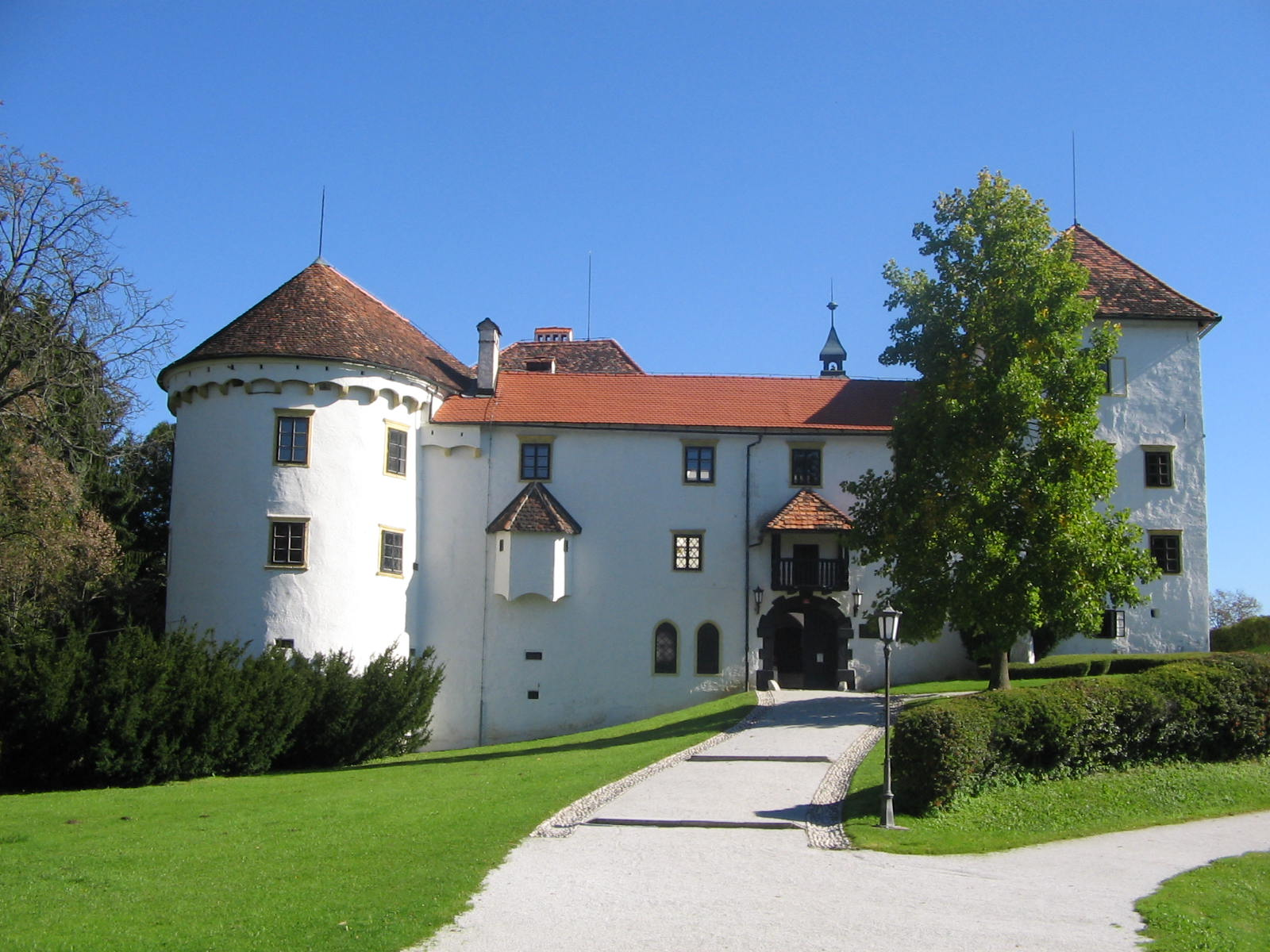
Bogenšperk Castle

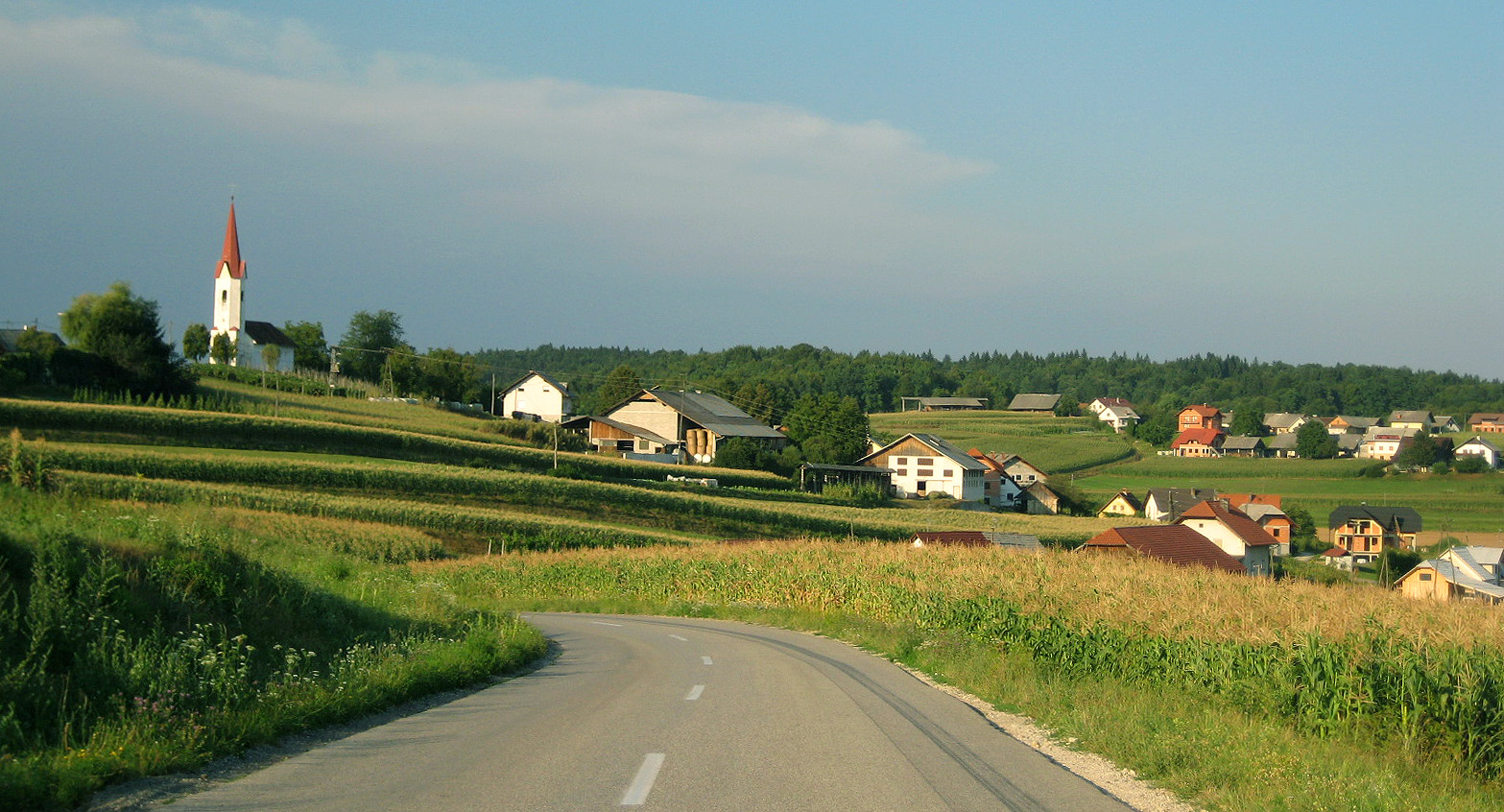
Rural landscape near Trebnje

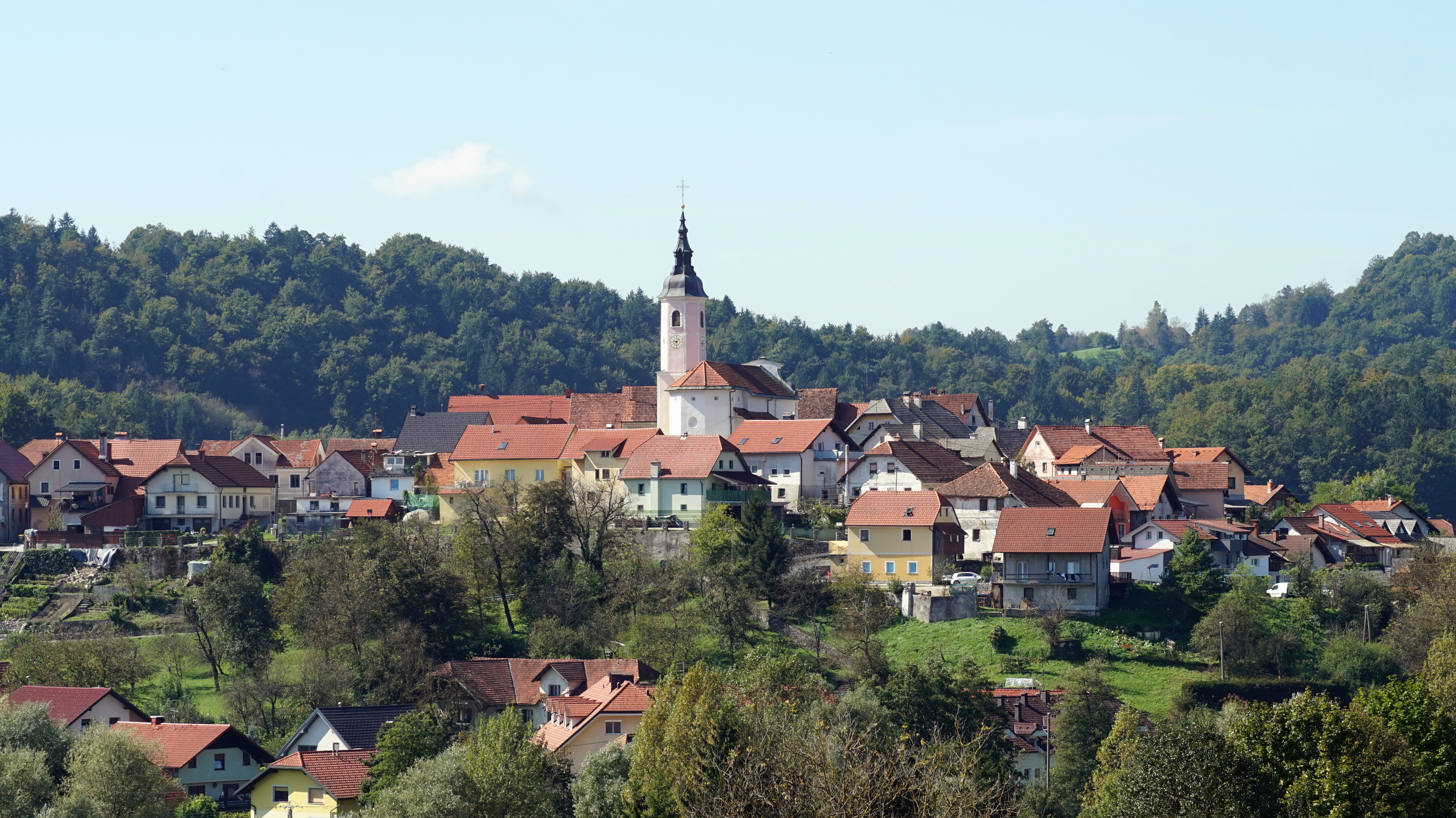
Višnja Gora

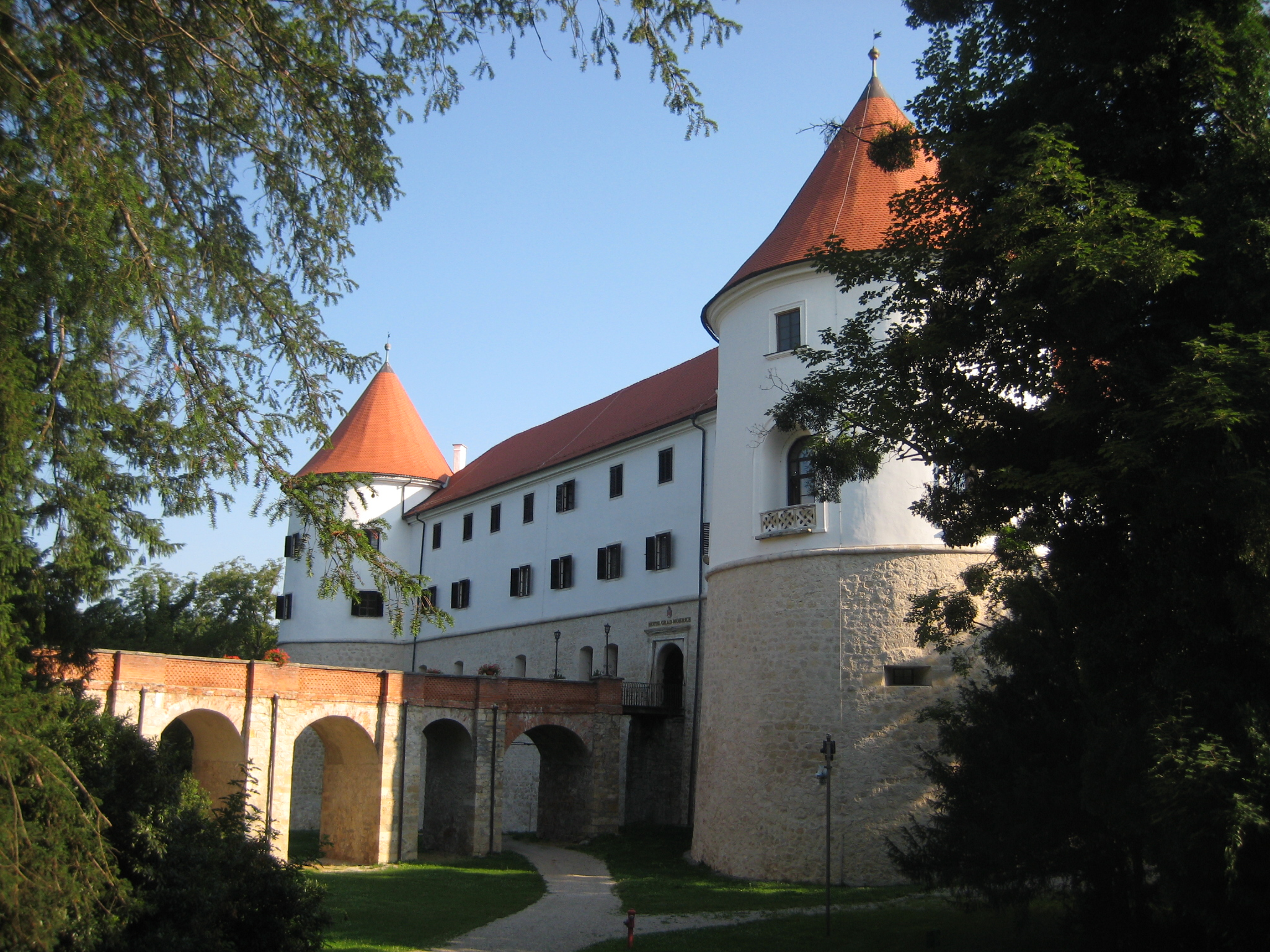
Mokrice Castle

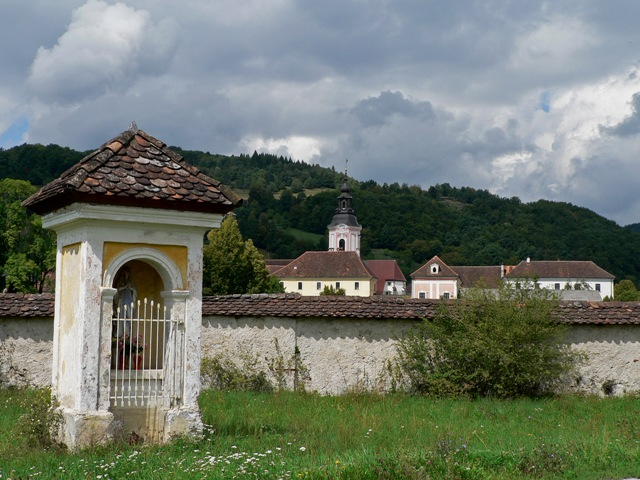
Stična Abbey

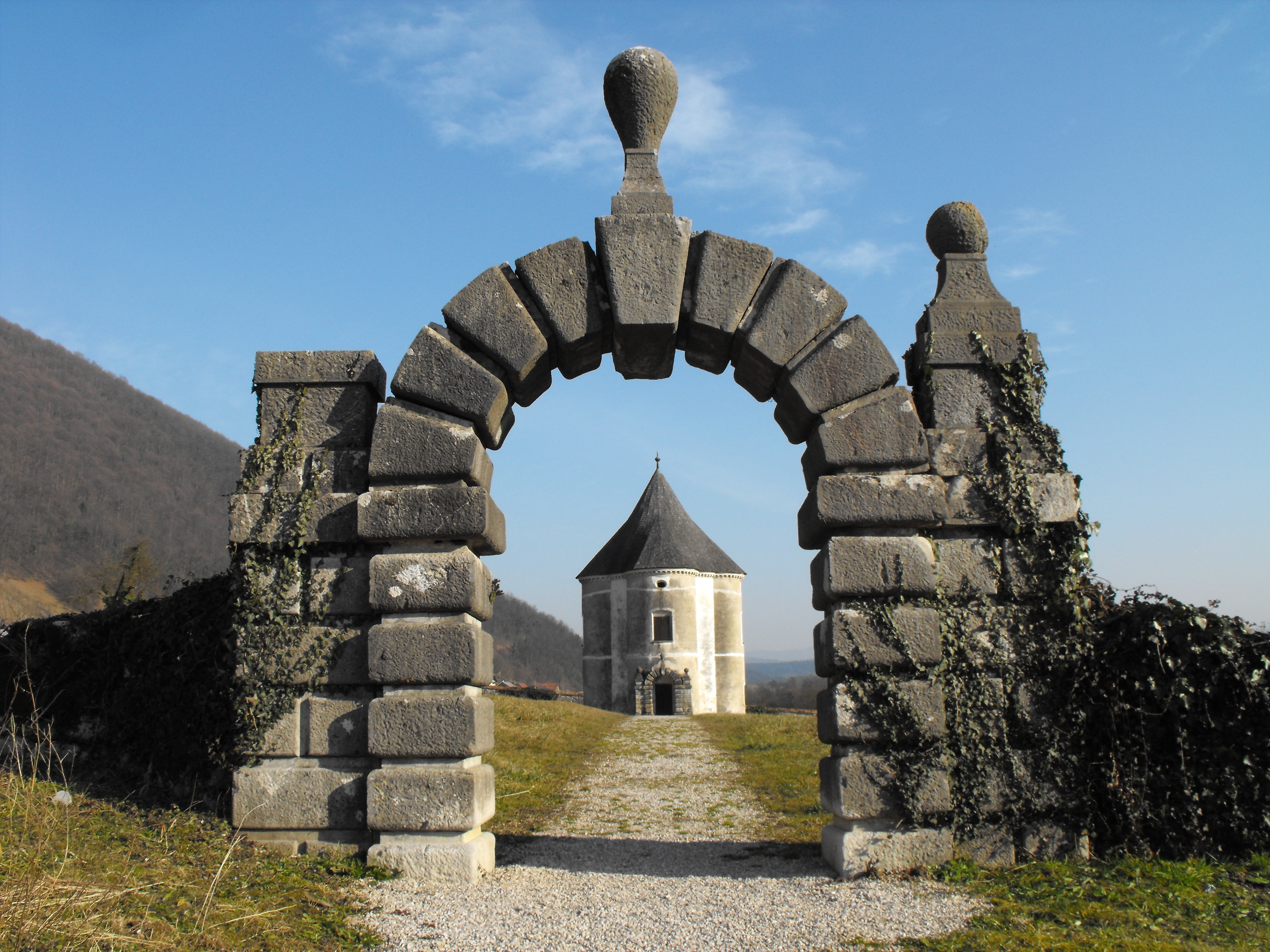
Devil's Tower

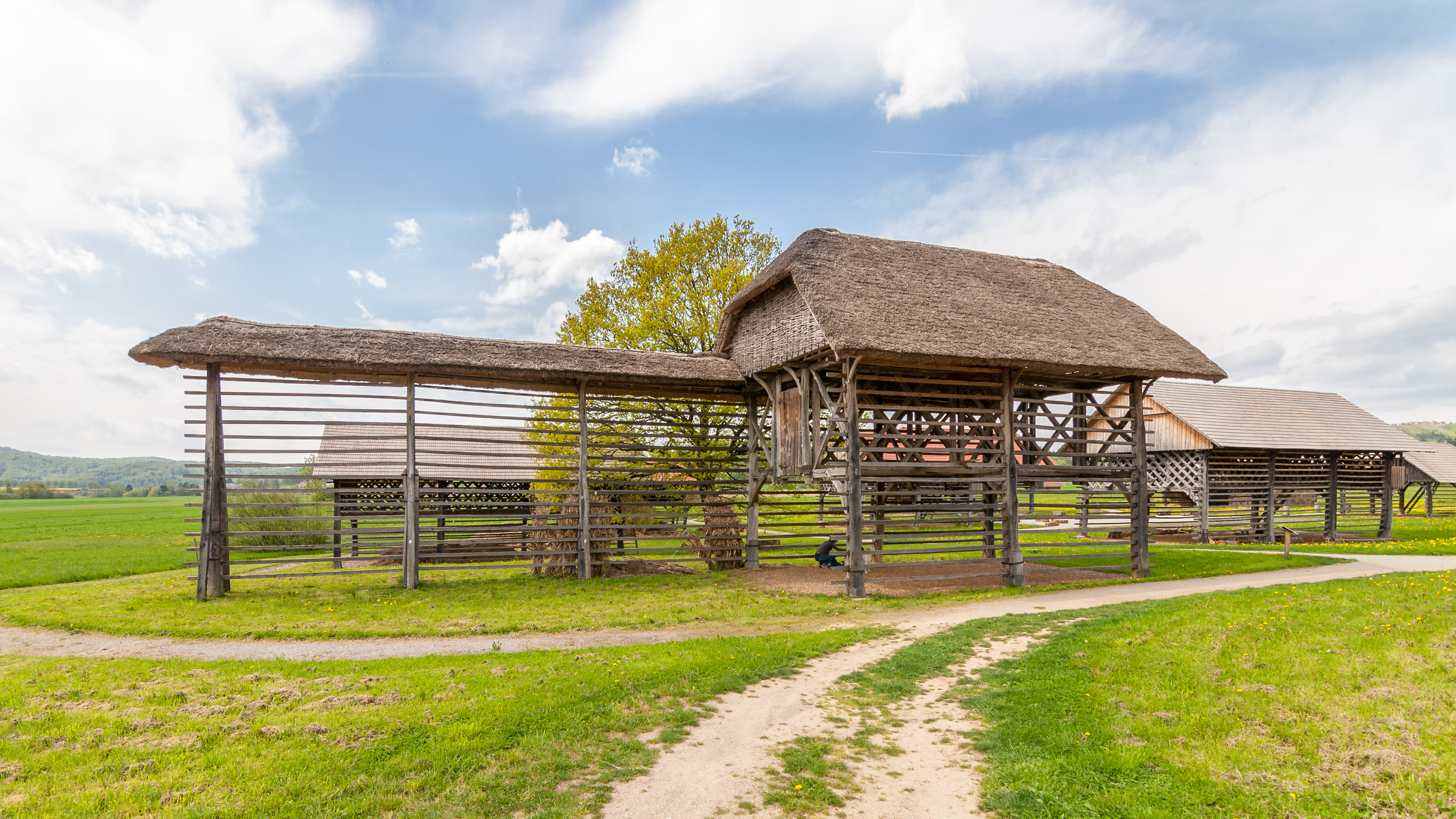
Hayrack Museum in Šentrupert

== See also ==
- Lower Carniolan dialect group
- Gottscheerish
- Southeast Slovenia Statistical Region
