= MC Flasher =

MC Flasher (born Simon Pribac) is a Slovenian-Canadian electronic music performance artist. As a longtime resident and art director of Slovenia's most famed club Ambasada Gavioli, MC Flasher has been the developer of new wave techno MC-ing and the creator of Ambasada's ideological structure in years 1998 to 2005. During his techno career he collaborated and performed with several other artists, including Takkyū Ishino, Sven Vaeth, Claude Young, Luke Slater, Dee Lite, Josh Wink), DJ Umek, Billy Nasty, and Craig Walsh.

He is also the organizer and artistic director of the annual Music and Art festival The Final Flash, which takes place in Slovenia.

== History ==
Flasher began performing as the front man in the progressive punk rock band 'Pudding Fields' in 1993 and as an actor in various theatres in Slovenia and Northern Italy. He received his first voice/speech training at the Slovenian radio and television broadcasting company RTV Slovenia. He later produced and hosted several alternative music radio shows on different Slovenian radio stations.

In 1998 he began to work on a techno/house vocal animation project under the supervision of Ambasada Gavioli as producer and Valentino Kanzyani as art director. As a techno MC he created a fusion of different approaches, techniques, and skills he developed through his theatre, music, radio, and television work and later took charge of Ambasada Gavioli's art direction and outreach sector.
