= Flasher =

Flasher may refer to:

- A person who exposes their body indecently as exhibitionism
- A vehicle's hazard or turn signal
- Lobotes surinamensis, the Atlantic tripletail fish
- Flasher, American indie rock band from Washington D.C.
- Flasher, North Dakota, a community in the United States
- USS Flasher (SS-249), a Gato-class submarine, commissioned in 1943 and stricken in 1959
- USS Flasher (SSN-613), a Permit-class submarine, commissioned in 1966 and struck in 1992
- MC Flasher, Slovenian–Canadian electronic music artist, founder of the Final Flash City festival
