= Silence (band) =

Slovene electronic music duo

- Origin: Ljubljana, Slovenia
- Genres: Synthpop, pop, electronic
- Years active: 1992–present
- Labels: PEKINPAH Association, Chrom Records, Accession Records, Nika Records, Matrix Music
- Members: Boris Benko; Primož Hladnik
- Past members: Matjaž Ferenc (1992–1995)
- Website: www.silence-zone.com

Silence is a Slovene electronic, synthpop and soundtrack music composing duo consisting of Boris Benko (singer and songwriter) and Primož Hladnik (keyboards and arrangements). Their fanbase and their tours are currently limited to Slovenia, Germany and parts of Eastern Europe. Outside the region, the band is probably mostly known for the album Vain, A Tribute To A Ghost and their collaboration with Laibach on the album Volk in 2006.

The music is characterized by melancholy, experimental sounds and vocal arrangements as well as meticulous production. The band is also known to incorporate various live instruments in their recordings, such as the piano, violin, viola, double bass, cello, valiha and other. The duo is recognized for their vast involvement in music writing for contemporary plays in Slovenian theater. Usually they will tour with the cast, or even be part of it, and perform the music live.

Musicians from the End of the World (Glasbenika s konca sveta), directed by Haidy Kancler and produced by RTV Slovenia, is a 30-minute film which candidly documents the lives and two-decade long career of Silence. It also follows the band on their testing journey to producing their first studio album release in 8 years. Musical Accompaniment for the End of the World (Songs for Two Pianos, Tactful Synths and Voice) contains the 10 songs unveiled in the documentary and was scheduled to be released on April 14, 2012 — the 100th anniversary of the sinking of the RMS Titanic.

== History ==
=== Getting started (1992–1998) ===
Silence was founded in 1992 by Boris Benko, Matjaž Ferenc and Primož Hladnik. The band's first concert was held in Ljubljana two years later. In 1995, experienced producer Peter Penko (Laibach, Coptic Rain, April Nine, Siddharta) began a collaboration with the duo. Ferenc left the band the same year. Silence made their international debut in 1996 with the song "Shut Up", which was featured on the synthpop compilation Daydream Collection released on the German label Gymnastic. The band signed a two-album contract with German label Chrom Records the same year. The Berlin independent label (located in Munich at the time of the contract signing) houses, among other artists, Deine Lakaien, Distain! and Helium Vola. Chrom Records released Silence's debut album Ma Non Troppo in 1997, an album that was declared Album of the month by the influential German magazine New Life. The first single from the debut album was "Samuel's Gabriel", described by the band as "a cynical protest against the hypocrisy of the Clergy and Christianity as a political institution." The video was shot in Munich and on the shores of Kenya in 1998. This was followed by a short German tour together with Distain!. Famous and internationally acclaimed producer Gregor Zemljič (Random Logic) produced four songs for the upcoming follow-up album to Ma Non Troppo before the end of the busy year.

=== Follow-up album (1999–2001) ===
In 1999, Crom Records released Silence's second album, Unlike A Virgin. The album was voted Album of the year in Orkus, the popular German alternative music magazine. It received the highest grades in reviews by Hannoversche Allgemeine Zeitung, Ragazzi, Online.de, Wrath and Zillo among others. A few months after the release of their second album, in March 2000, the band gave a sold out unplugged performance in Stih's hall, Cankarjev Dom, Ljubljana. Silence was accompanied by Blaz Medja (drums), Ales Berkopec (acoustic guitar) and the Rozmarinke string quartet. The concert was broadcast live on radio and is one of the band's most memorable performances to date. Crom Records released "Son Of Sin", the first single from Unlike A Virgin. Meanwhile, the duo wrote the soundtrack for Midnight Meat Flight, a performance by the notorious "Betontanc" dance theater, and Delo classified Unlike A Virgin "one of the five most important Slovenian albums of the year". It was also nominated for best newcomer at the "Bumerang" alternative music awards. Benko provided vocals for the song "Cliffs Of Norway", written by Ernst Horn (Deine Lakaien) and featured on the compilation Subout, released by Waldorf in 2000, together with De/Vision, Oomph!, Front 242, Front Line Assembly and Wolfsheim to name a few, many of which contributed with previously unreleased tracks.

=== More theater (2001–2003) ===
Silence started off 2001 by composing the music for Peter Pan, a play jointly produced by Lutkovno gledališče Ljubljana and Slovensko Mladinsko gledališče. Benko also sang live in Švic & švarc (Sweat & Soot), a post-modern ballet piece interpreted by Fico Balet and directed by Goran Bogdanovski.

In 2002, Silence wrote the soundtracks for Maison Des Rendez-Vous, another Betontanc play, and "Viktorji", the biggest Slovenian media awards. The duo kept working with soundtrack projects and in 2003 they wrote two songs for Emofad (Emotivity Of Adventures), a contemporary dance performance directed and choreographed by Goran Bogdanovski. Benko and Random Logic also performed live during the dance performances. Nika Records released the Maison Des Rendez-Vous soundtrack in Slovenia. Later the same year, Silence recorded "Hall Of Mirrors" for Trans Slovenia Express Vol. 2, a compilation of Kraftwerk covers recorded by Slovenian acts. The track featured Anne Clark as guest vocalist.

=== A tribute to a ghost (2003–2005) ===
A promotional photo of the duo circa 2004

The band worked with Betontanc again in 2004 and wrote the soundtrack for their tenth play, Wrestling Dostoievsky. In addition to that, they wrote a soundtrack for Winnie The Pooh, a puppet show by Lutkovno gledališče Ljubljana. Silence also produced several tracks for the female string quartet Rožmarinke. In November 2004, their third and most successful album to date, Vain, A Tribute To A Ghost was released by Matrix Music and Chrom Records, and the release was followed up by another sold out unplugged performance in Ljubljana. Silence would write one more soundtrack this year – the soundtrack for Lulabaj, a theatre play produced by Slovensko mladinsko gledališče. Vain, A Tribute To A Ghost was listed as one of the three best releases of 2004 in Slovenia by Delo.

Their first soundtrack of 2005 was for Veronika decides..., a contemporary dance performance directed by Gagik Ismailian and produced by the Slovene National Theatre Opera and Ballet Ljubljana. An exclusive limited edition of the soundtrack, entitled Veronika was released when the show premiered. The band also toured with Diary Of Dreams in 2005, while Matrix Music released Skin: The Remixes, featuring remixes by Umek, Valentino Kanzyani and Random Logic. The band worked with "Lutkovno gledališče Ljubljana" again and wrote the soundtrack for the puppet show Peter Rabbit.

=== Key decisions (2005–2006) ===
At the end of 2005 Silence was signed to Accession Records in Germany. Once again the duo held a sold out acoustic performance at Cankarjev Dom, before releasing Key under the new label. The release was a 2CD compilation of pivotal Silence tracks, nine of which previously unreleased. The first CD was an anthology, while the second one was more of a collector's item and featured rarities within a wide scope of genres.

Critically praised Tesla Electric Company, which opened July 19, 2006, marked Silence's first collaboration with influential director Tomaž Pandur and arguably the duo's most successful contribution to a play. The soundtrack featured a selection of older Silence material and a handful of tracks written specifically for the show. The duo performed the songs live, incarnating singing and piano-playing Nikola Teslas at given occasions. Tesla was portrayed by no less than seven different actors, including Rade Šerbedžija.

The Laibach album Volk, released in October 2006, is a collaboration between Laibach and Silence.

=== The Passion of the Cold (2007–2008) ===
On 1 September 2008 Silence released their new album The Passion of the Cold. On the same day the Bulgarian poet Svetoslav Todorov issued his debut poetry e-book І. Obezkostiavane on his blog with "The True Nature of Happiness", one of the songs on the album, being included in the rar file.

The Passion of the Cold is conceived as a handmade book containing two CD's, features 90 minutes of music from (or inspired by) Tomaž Pandur's plays Barroco and Kaligula. Only 500 numbered and hand-signed copies are available exclusively at their official website.

== Discography ==
=== Studio albums ===
- 1997 – Ma Non Troppo
- 1999 – Unlike a Virgin
- 2004 – Vain, A Tribute to a Ghost
- 2012 – Musical Accompaniment for the End of the World (Songs for Two Pianos, Tactful Synths and Voice)
- 2022 - The Vocabulary of Madness

=== Compilations ===
- 2006 – Key Silence

=== Original soundtracks ===
- 2003 – Maison Des Rendez-Vous
- 2005 – Veronika
- 2008 – The Passion of the Cold

=== Collaborations ===
- 2006 – Album: Volk (with Laibach)
- 2006 – Single: Anglia (with Laibach)
- 2014 – EP: 1 VIII 1944. Warszawa (with Laibach)

=== Singles ===
- 2000 – Son Of Sin
- 2005 – Skin: The Remixes (by Valentino Kanzyani and DJ Umek)
- 2008 – The True Nature of Happiness (Digital Release)
