= Woodland Pristava =

Music festival

Woodland Pristava is an electronic dance music festival held annually since 2013. Takes place at the first weekend in July in Pristava nad Stično, Slovenia. Headliners have included Armin van Buuren, David Guetta, and W&W. It is Slovenia's leading electronic music festival.

== Events ==
=== Woodland Pristava 2013 ===
The first edition of Woodland Festival took place 5–6 July 2013. Ten thousand people passed through the festival's gates over the two days, and over 20 artists performed on the two stages. Lineup: Mike Candys, Carl Cox, Umek, Ran-D, Alex Gaudino, Odesza, Krafty Kuts, Vanillaz, Sasha Lopez, Beltek, Sylvain, Marien Baker, Deejaytime, Clay Clemens, Kasnich Brothers, Miss K8, DJ YOCO, Far Ahead

=== Woodland Pristava 2014 ===
The second edition of Woodland Festival took place 4–6 July 2014. More than 30,000 people passed through the festival's gates over the three days, and over 30 artists pereformed on the four stages. Lineup: W&W, Yves V, DJ Antoine, Vinai, Markus Schulz, Carl Cox, Laidback Luke, Umek, Chuckie, Krewella, Gramatik, GLOWINTHEDARK, Djs from Mars, Sven Väth, Joris Voorn, Eva Shaw, Vanillaz, Sasha Lopez, Beltek, Viktoria Metzker, Shermanology, Clay Clemens

=== Woodland Pristava 2015 ===
The latest edition of Woodland Festival took place from 5–7 July 2015. More than 75,000 people passed through the festival's gates over the three days, and over 40 artists performed on the five stages. Lineup: Armin van Buuren, David Guetta, Oliver Heldens, R3hab, Nervo, Vinai, Vicetone, Showtek, Umek, Kaskade, Sander van Doorn, Knife Party, Djs from Mars, Jay Hardway, Shapeshifters, Shermanology, Vanillaz, Sasha Lopez, Beltek, Viktoria Metzker, Shermanology
