= Cviček =

Slovenian wine from Dolenjska

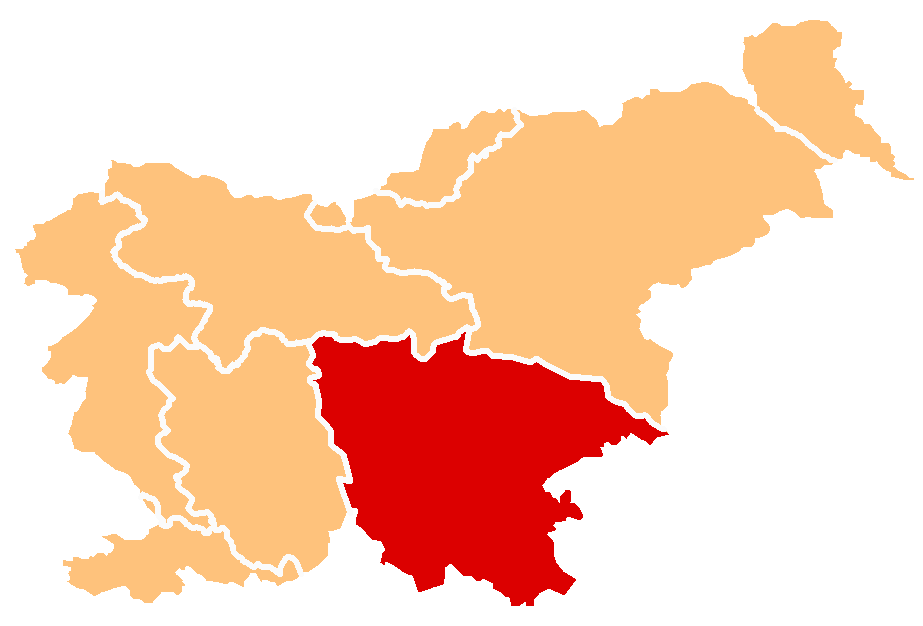
Location of Lower Carniola

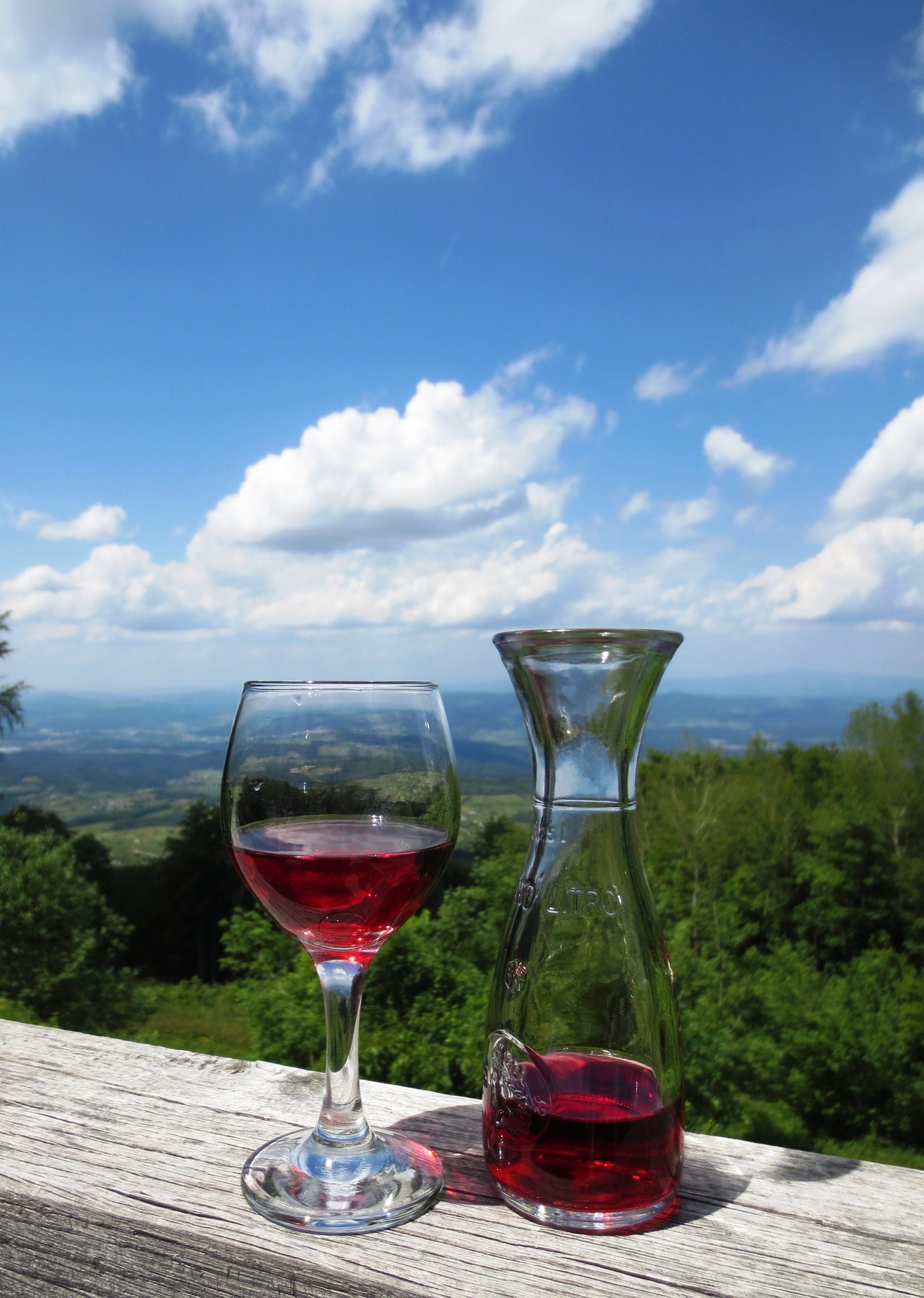
Glass of Cviček with its typical colour

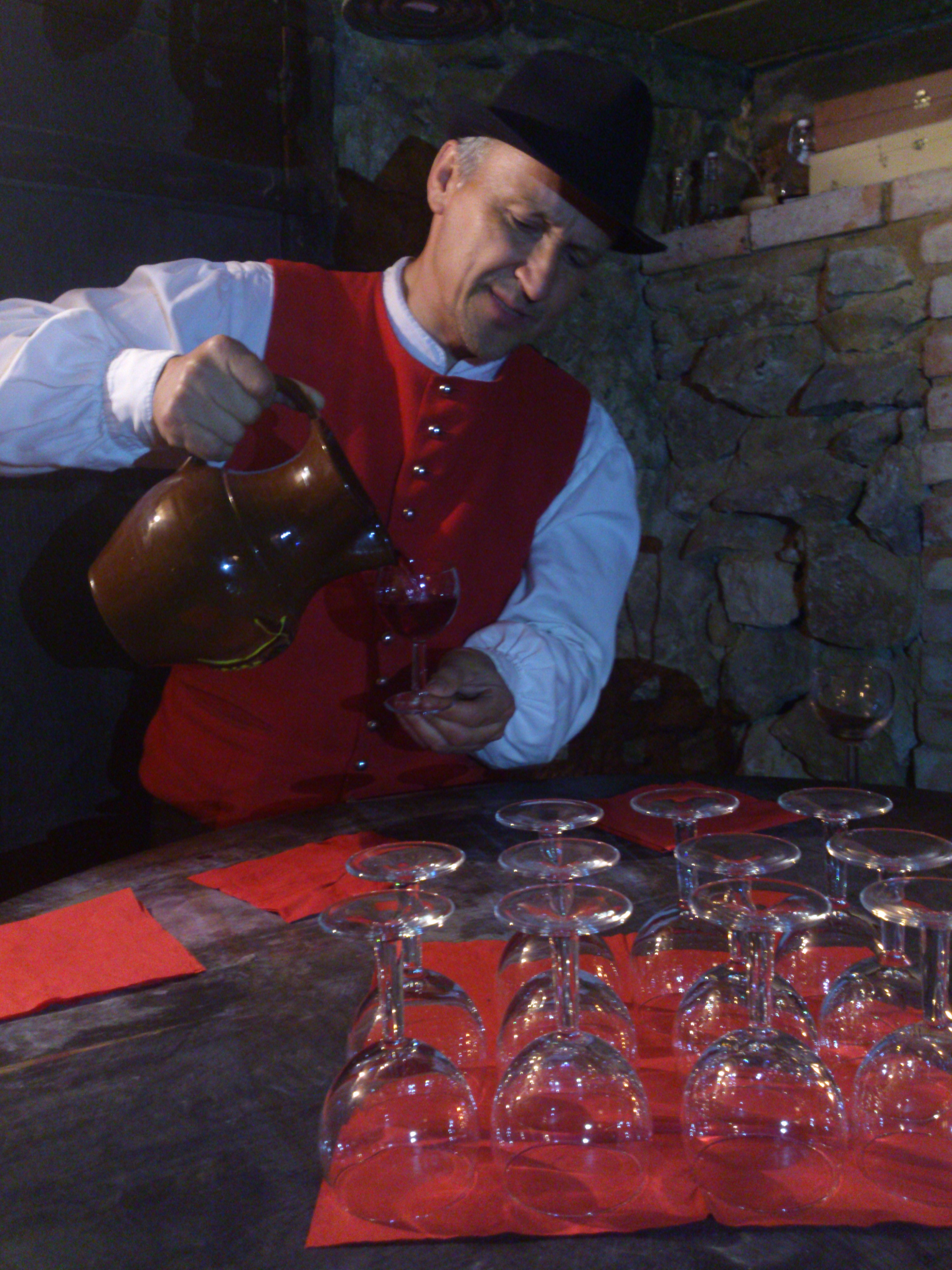
Pouring a glass of Cviček

Cviček is a Slovenian wine from the Lower Carniola region of Slovenia. It is a unique wine, composed of different grape varieties including both white and red grape species. It has a relatively low alcoholic content of 8.5% to 10%. Despite its long history of being known as a sour and poor wine, it has recently become a very popular drink with both local people and visitors to the region.

== History ==
In the Middle Ages, the region which later became known as Lower Carniola was part of the Windic March (also Slovene or Slavonic March), often called simply "March". Its wine was thus named Marvin (from German Marwein from Markwein), which was also mentioned by Valvasor, a seventeenth-century Carniolan historian. With the abolition of old viticultural system, people started to neglect vineyards, vine decay grew larger and larger and concomitantly, wine quality started to drop gradually. Becoming more and more sour, people referred to it as cviček (an old Slovenian word denoting very sour wine) and somehow the name stuck, allegedly also because of the synonymous German expression zwikt. After gaining independence the people living in Lower Carniola began to defend the quality of the wine, and today it has become a popular casual drink for locals and visitors alike.

== Production ==
Cviček is produced by a complex process where a mixture of different varieties of grapes are added together to create the final product. The main ingredient of the wine is Žametna Črnina which composes 45% of Cviček. It generally is an old wine type which requires a lot of sun. Despite this, it does not contain a high amount of sugar but does have enough acidic qualities to be the basic ingredient. Žametna is the oldest type of grape vine in Europe, being at least 400 years old, and it grows in the ancient part of Maribor. Modra Frankinja or Blue Franconian, as it is known, is another wine which makes up Cviček and this gives the wine its full flavour. Kraljevina, is then added which is a white wine and is used to change the acidity level so that the wine is more drinkable. Laški Rizling, or Italian Riesling, can occasionally be added. This is because there is no exact formula to Cviček and so every Cviček Winemaker has their own taste of Cviček which is unique to their vineyard. The alcohol level can also be altered but can not be any more than 10% volume. It can be an issue during especially hot seasons which creates more sugar in the grapes, because this means a higher alcohol volume during the wine making process. To counterbalance this, the amount of Žametovka is increased as this has a much lower alcohol content.

== Wine style ==
It is common for Cviček to have a characteristic acidity; this, however, does not necessarily imply it has to be too sour. Some might say it would be inappropriate to make it sweeter in order to gain wider acceptance, but slightly acidic taste goes great with traditional hearty Slovenian food.

== Health Benefits ==
As with other red wines, a number of health effects are claimed. Among other wines, it has a relatively low level of sugar and a low alcohol level. This means it can be drunk by diabetics, and the calorie content is low by comparison with most other wines. Some examples of health claims for red wine include reduced cardiovascular risks; favourable effect on digestion; promotes metabolism; can prevent insomnia and strengthens the blood stream. Regular consumption has been claimed to prevent heart attacks. Several studies have concluded that regular consumption of red wine such as Cviček (1 to 2 glasses per day) improves the antioxidant activity of the blood and prevents the aggregation of blood platelets, thus reducing the risk for a stroke or heart attack. In that sense, ethyl alcohol in the wine acts similarly to a solvent. Scientists examining cancer occurrence and development have found also many anti-tumour substances in red wine.
