= Musical Accompaniment for the End of the World =

Studio album by Silence
- Released: April 14, 2012 (Slovenia)
- Recorded: Vatroslav Lisinski Concert Hall (Zagreb, Croatia) & Daily Girl (Ljubljana, Slovenia), 2011
- Genre: Adult contemporary
- Label: PEKINPAH Association
- Producer: Primož Hladnik & Boris Benko

Silence chronology
Vain, A Tribute to a Ghost (2004)	Musical Accompaniment for the End of the World (2012)

Singles from Musical Accompaniment for the End of the World
- 1. "Death is New York" Released: February 10, 2012; 2. "Heart of Darkness" Released: March 9, 2012

Musical Accompaniment for the End of the World (Songs for Two Pianos, Tactful Synths and Voice) is the fourth studio album by the Slovene duo Silence, released on April 14, 2012 — the 100th anniversary of the sinking of the RMS Titanic. The recording of the prominent piano instrumentals was made at Vatroslav Lisinski Concert Hall in Zagreb, Croatia, on July 1, 2011, with Igor Vicentić and Sašo Vollmaier accompaniment.

"I like the fact that some creative chaos exists in a person’s life, that there are some things you can’t put in their proper place, things that bother you[.] ...I hope that our music brings [uneasiness] to people, the kind I search for [myself] in other art forms."

—Benko speaking in the "Musicians from the End of the World" documentary.

A follow-up release to their 2004 studio album, Vain, A Tribute to a Ghost, had been promised by Silence since 2008 on the Internet. Ful details were finally unveiled with the screening of the 30 minute film, Glasbenika s konca sveta (Musicians from the End of the World). Directed by Haidy Kancler and produced by RTV Slovenija, the film revealed the album track listing and, most prominently, utilized song previews from the upcoming album as the soundtrack whilst candidly documenting the band's two-decade long career.

Silence took an experimental approach to the album's accompanying music videos by using footage from the personal archive of the highly acclaimed Slovene filmmaker Boštjan Hladnik. The band released their first, official video in seven years for the song "Death is New York" on February 10, 2012. It used footage from a short film directed by Boštjan in 1954, titled Pravljica o ljubezni (Fable of Love). A second video, for the song "Heart of Darkness", was uploaded to YouTube on March 9, 2012, which also uses footage from a Boštjan Hladnik film, 1971's Maškarada ('Masquerade').

== Track listing ==
No.	Title	Writer(s)	Length
1.	"Hunger"	Benko, Hladnik	5:18
2.	"Sing"	Benko, Hladnik	4:39
3.	"Silkskin"	Benko, Hladnik	3:40
4.	"Pioneers of Nothing"	Benko, Hladnik	5:55
5.	"Naïf"	Benko, Hladnik	2:36
6.	"Sturmschlager"	Benko, Hladnik	2:36
7.	"Electricity"	Benko, Hladnik	3:15
8.	"Wish Me Well, Wish Me Hell"	Benko, Hladnik	4:14
9.	"Heart of Darkness"	Benko, Hladnik	4:09
10.	"Death is New York"	Benko, Hladnik	4:44
Total length:			41:06

Notes

- Although Benko and Hladnik wrote and arranged all of the music, the majority of the piano used in all recordings were performed by Igor Vicentić and Sašo Vollmaier.
