= Like a Virgin =

Like a Virgin may refer to:

== Music ==
- Like a Virgin (album), a 1984 album by Madonna
- Like a Virgin, a 2004 EP by These Arms Are Snakes and Harkonen
- "Like a Virgin" (song), a 1984 song by Madonna
- "Like a Virgin", a 1991 song by MC Lyte from the album Act Like You Know

== Film and television ==
- Like a Virgin (film), 2006
- "Like a Virgin" (Dante's Cove), 2007
- "Like a Virgin" (Dawson's Creek), 1999
- "Like a Virgin" (Ellen), 1997
- "Like a Virgin" (Family Matters), 1994
- "Like a Virgin" (Grounded for Life), 2001
- "Like a Virgin" (Instant Star), 2007
- "Like a Virgin" (Las Vegas), 2006
- "Like a Virgin" (Roseanne), 1990
- "Like a Virgin" (Supernatural), 2011
- "Like a Virgin" (Veronica Mars), 2004
- "Like a Virgin" (The War at Home), 2005
- "Like a Virgin" (Winners & Losers), 2011

== Literature ==
- Like a Virgin (book), a 2012 book by Aarathi Prasad exploring virgin birth
- Like a Virgin: Secrets They Won't Teach You at Business School, a book by Richard Branson

== See also ==
- "Like a Virgin Sacrificed", a song from Glory, Glamour and Gold by Army of Lovers
- "Plange quasi virgo" (Lament Like a Virgin), Tenebrae responsory
