= Ma Non Troppo =

Studio album by Silence
- Released: March 10, 1997
- Recorded: Raingarden 9, Ljubljana & MSM Studios, Munich.
- Genre: Synthpop
- Length: 53:55
- Label: Chrom Records
- Producer: Peter Penko

Silence chronology
Ma Non Troppo (1997)	Unlike A Virgin (1999)

Ma Non Troppo is the debut album by Slovenian band Silence, released on March 10, 1997 - the year after the band's signing to Chrom Records. It was voted "Album of the month" in "New Life".

== Track listing ==
1. "Samuel's Gabriel" – 4:17
2. "La Troia" – 4:20
3. "The Rain" – 3:30
4. "Neglected" – 3:26
5. "In Your Name" – 4:20
6. "The Girl Of My Best Friend" – 3:26
7. "I Love You" – 3:44
8. "Kraljestvo Mačjih Oči" – 2:46
9. "Quasi Vesna" – 4:52
10. "I'm A Memory" – 4:28
11. "#1 Hit Single" – 2:26*
- * Unlisted bonus track.

== Personnel ==
- Silence is:
  - Boris Benko
  - Primož Hladnik
- All songs written and arranged by B. Benko, except tracks 8 and 9, written by B. Benko and P. Hladnik. Track 6 written by Ross & Bobrick. All lyrics by B. Benko, except track 6. Samuel's Gabriel features Katja Saponic.
- Produced by Peter Penko at Raingarden 9, Ljubljana.
- Mastering by Christoph Stickel MSM Studios, Munich.
- Editing by Aleš Dvoržak at Kif Kif, Ljubljana.
- Design and photography by Fred Stichnoth.
- Additional musicians:
  - Katja Saponjic, vocals: "Samuel's Gabriel".
- Special thanks to: Klavdij, Waldo, Matjaz, Katrin, Ziga, Barbara, Bostjan, Katja Saponjic, Saso Bole, Spela Predan, starsi and everyone at Chrom Records. The rest is silence.
- Realized by: Carl D. Erling and Sönke Held.
- Label: Chrom Records
