= Unlike a Virgin (album) =

Unlike A Virgin

Studio album by Silence
- Released: October 18, 1999
- Recorded: Raingarden 9, Ljubljana & Microlab, Ljubljana.
- Genre: Synthpop
- Length: 50:42
- Label: Chrom Records
- Producer: Peter Penko, Gregor Zemljič, Miha Klemenčič

Silence chronology
Ma Non Troppo (1997)	Unlike A Virgin (1999)	Vain, A Tribute To A Ghost (2004)

Unlike A Virgin is the second album of Slovenian band Silence, released on October 18, 1999. According to the band, it covers about eight years of work. Most of the songs were actually written at the very beginnings of Silence (92–94) and labeled "too strange for publication" at the time. It was awarded "Album of the year" in "Orkus", one of the most influential German alternative music magazines. It received top reviews by "Hannoversche Allgemeine Zeitung", "Ragazzi", "Online.de", "Wrath" and "Zillo" to mention a few.

== Track listing ==
1. "Son Of Sin" – 4:38
2. "Drive" – 4:52
3. "Scream, Greeneyes" – 4:12
4. "Etwas" – 1:28
5. "The Fifth Elephant" – 4:03
6. "Barbara" – 4:27
7. "God Forsaken Country" – 4:10
8. "Heavy Straighter" – 4:36
9. "Nevermind The Bastard" – 4:28
10. "4-2" – 4:05
11. "P.S." – 5:49
12. "Tschudno" – 3:55*
- * Unlisted bonus track.

== Personnel ==
- Silence is:
  - Boris Benko
  - Primož Hladnik
- All songs written by Boris Benko.
- All tracks produced by Peter Penko at Raingarden 9, Ljubljana except tracks 8, 9 and 12.
- Tracks 8, 9 and 12 produced by Gregor Zemljič and Miha Klemenčič at Microlab, Ljubljana.
- Mastering by Janez Križaj at Metro, Ljubljana.
- Editing by Aleš Dvoržak at Kif Kif, Ljubljana.
- Front cover and photos by Fred Stichnoth.
- Layout by Boris Benko and Carl D. Erling.
- Additional musicians:
  - Double Bass, tracks 5 and 12, by Žiga Golob.
  - Cello, track 10, by Barbara Jarc.
  - Guitars by Peter Penko.
  - Strings, track 7, by Jelena Ždrale and Eva-Julia Rečnik.
- Special thanks to: Vera & Bogdan Benko, Metka & Boštjan Hladnik, Bajča, Zemljič & konjič, Katrin, Žare, Marta, Dalibor, Waldo, Grebo, Jure Novak, Rok Predan, Irena, Jani Novak and Pero "zmagovalec snemalec".
- Realized by: Carl D. Erling.
- Label: Chrom Records
