= Pristava nad Stično =

Pristava nad Stično Pristava (until 1953)
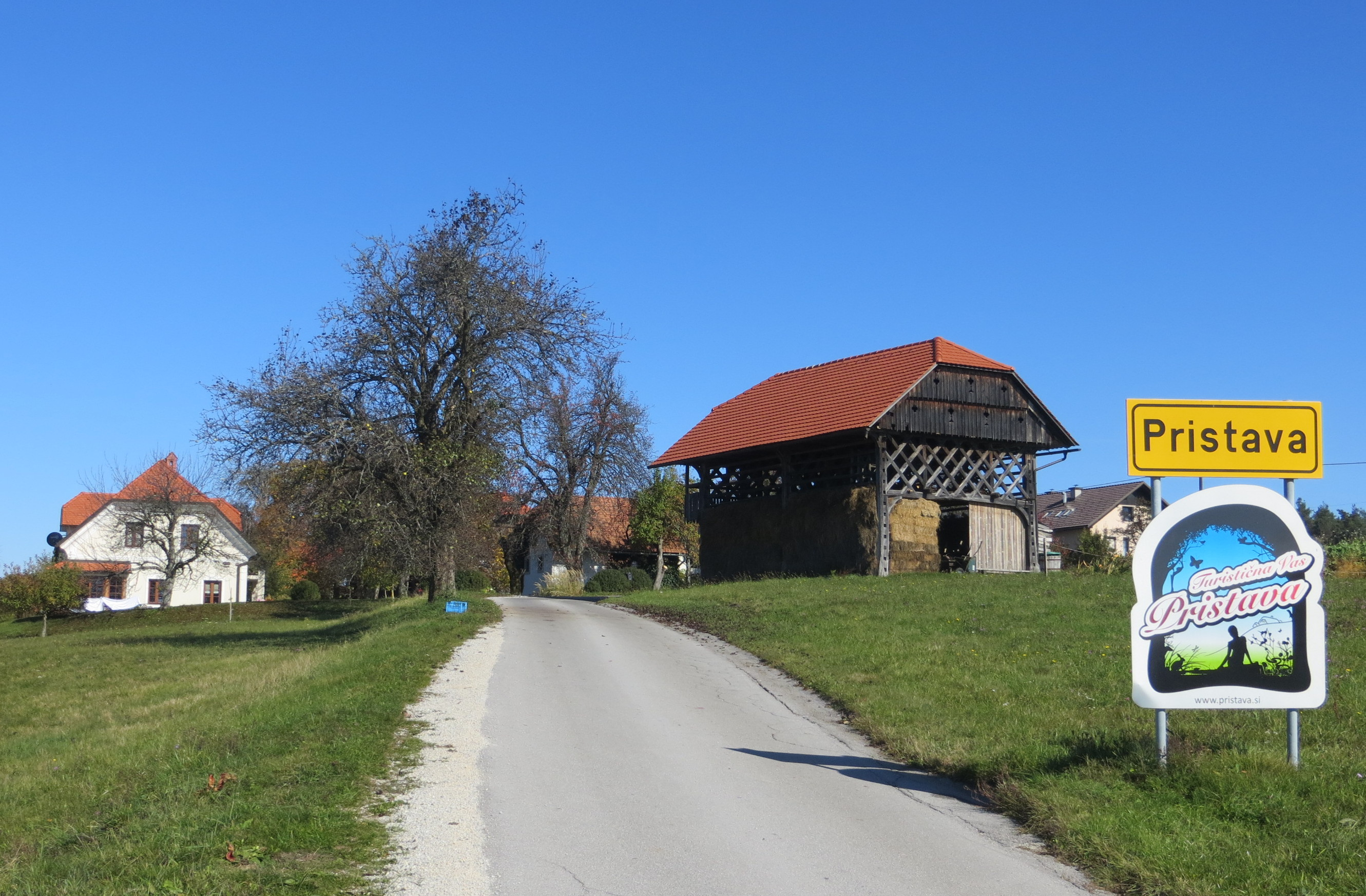

- Location in Slovenia
- Coordinates: 45°59′13.5″N 14°49′17.33″E
- Country: Slovenia
- Traditional region: Lower Carniola
- Statistical region: Central Slovenia
- Municipality: Ivančna Gorica

Area
  - Total: 1.48 km^{2} (0.57 sq mi)
- Elevation: 670.7 m (2,200 ft)

Population (2002)
  - Total: 16

Pristava nad Stično (pronounced [pɾiˈstaːʋa nat ˈstiːtʃnɔ]; German: Maierhof) is a small settlement in the hills north of Stična in the Municipality of Ivančna Gorica in central Slovenia. The area is part of the historical region of Lower Carniola. The municipality is now included in the Central Slovenia Statistical Region.

== Name ==
The name of the settlement was changed from Pristava to Pristava nad Stično in 1953. In the past the German name was Maierhof.

== Church ==
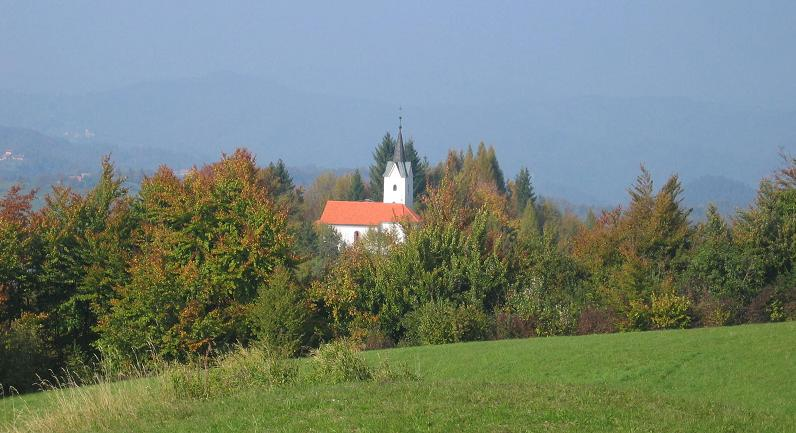
Saint Lambert's Church

The local church is dedicated to Saint Lambert and belongs to the Parish of Stična. It was built in 1497 on the site of a medieval castle where Viridis Visconti, the wife of Leopold III, Duke of Austria, lived after her husband's death in 1386 until her own death in 1414.
