= Like a Virgin (book) =

2012 book by Aarathi Prasad

- Author: Aarathi Prasad
- Language: English
- Subject: Virgin birth
- Publisher: Oneworld Publications
- Publication date: 1 September 2012
- Pages: 272
- ISBN: 9781851689118

Like a Virgin: How Science Is Redesigning the Rules of Sex is a book by the former cancer genetics researcher Aarathi Prasad exploring virgin birth through the whiptail lizard, the stingless wasp, the electric ant and the Beltsville small white turkey. Prasad also explores the possibilities of virgin birth in humans and touches on ovarian teratomas.

The book also takes a historical look of sexless reproduction and ancient stories of virgin birth.

== See also ==
- Parthenogenesis, birth without fertilization
- Miraculous births, virgin birth in mythology and religion
