= Valentino Kanzyani =

Slovene techno DJ and music producer

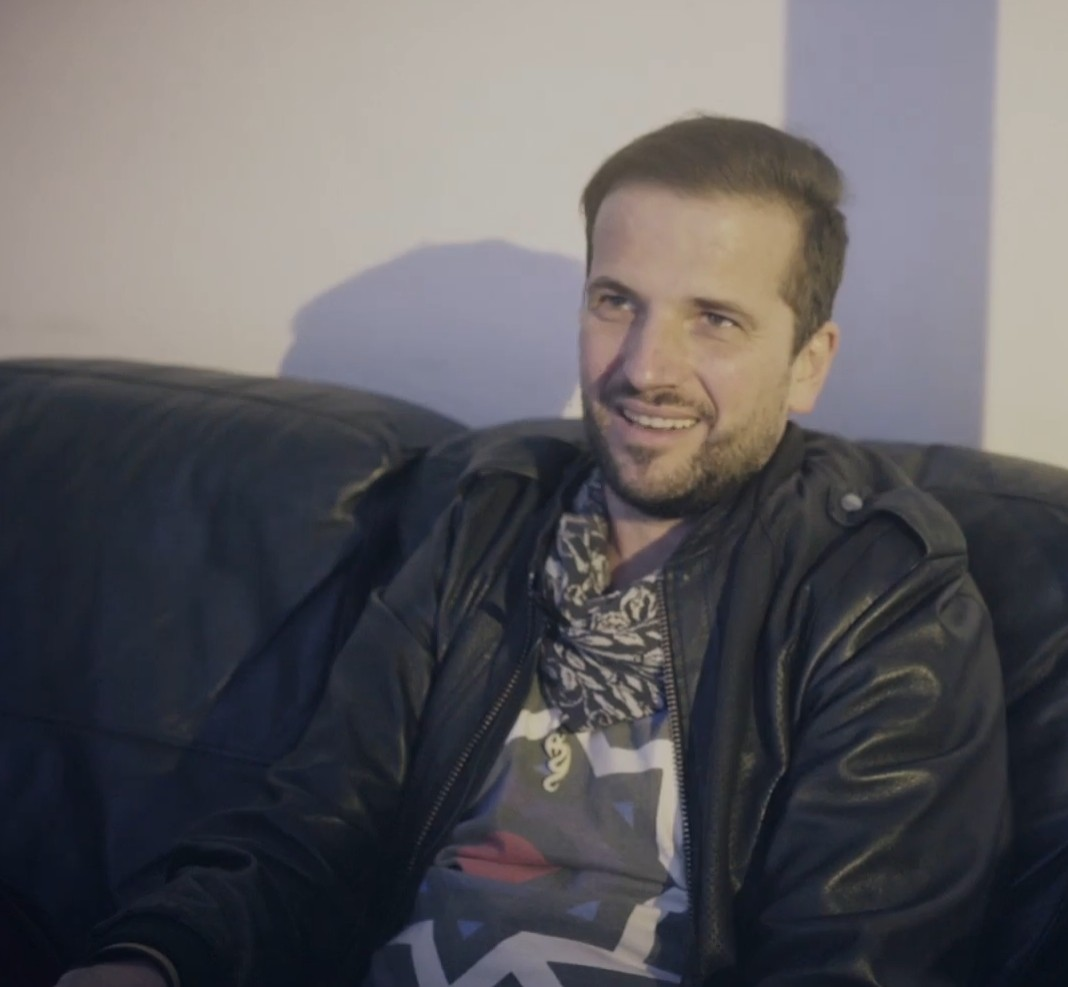

Background information
- Origin: Koper, Slovenia
- Genres: Techno
- Occupation: DJ
- Labels: Recycled Loops, Jesus Loved You

Tine Kocjančič, better known as Valentino Kanzyani is a Slovene techno deejay and music producer. He has also released records under the name Recycled Loops, which is also the name of one of the record labels that he co-runs (with DJ Umek), the other being Earresistable.

He became famous in Slovenia, when he started playing music in 1995 in a club called Ambasada Gavioli, together with his colleague DJ Umek. During a three-and-a-half-year period he booked and played with many of the top DJs in the world. He manages to play music from 3 turntables simultaneously. Valentino ranked at position 75 of the "TOP 100 DJs" selected by DJ Magazine.

He started his first label Recycled Loops in 1999 in cooperation with DJ Umek and Boštjan Marušič. In 2005 he founded record label Jesus Loved You whose last release was in 2018.

He has deejayed all over the world, and performed an Essential Mix on BBC Radio 1 in December 2003.

He has also been an in-demand remixer, mixing tracks by artists such as Ken Ishii, Simon Digby, Deep Dish, Wally Lopez, and Jon Carter.

He is the son of Slovenian musician Danilo Kocjančič who used to play in bands Kameleoni, Prizma, and Bazar.

== Discography ==
Releases

- Valentino Kanzyani: First Level Completed E.P. - Primate Recordings (2000)
- Valentino Kanzyani: Under Pressure EP - SuperBra (2000)
- Valentino Kanzyani: Why Not...EP - Primevil (2000)
- Valentino Kanzyani: House Soul EP - Intec Records (2001)
- Valentino Kanzyani: House Soul (Remixes) - Intec Records (2001)
- Valentino Kanzyani: Flying - Yoshitoshi Recordings (2002)
- Valentino Kanzyani: Pornorama - Earresistible Musick (2002)
- Valentino Kanzyani: Flying (Remixes) - Shinichi (2003)
- Valentino Kanzyani: Burros Eslovenos EP - Tronic (2004)
- Valentino Kanzyani: Injection - Mad Nurse (2004)
- Valentino Kanzyani: La Sala Loca EP - Recycled Loops (2004)
- Valentino Kanzyani: Learning How To Do It - Consumer Recreation (2004)
- Valentino Kanzyani: Intecnique Album Sampler - Intec Records (2005)
- Valentino Kanzyani: iPray - Jesus Loved You (2005)
- Valentino Kanzyani: Paradox - Jesus Loved You (2006)
- Valentino Kanzyani: Warders Of Our Own Prison EP - Intec Records (2006)
- Valentino Kanzyani: Homo Moralis - Relic Music (2006)
- Valentino Kanzyani: Paradox - Hz Trax (2007)
- Valentino Kanzyani: Seasons EP - Vezotonik (2007)
- Valentino Kanzyani: Zvijacca EP - Circle Music (2007)
- Valentino Kanzyani: Prizmas and Boomerangs - Jesus Loved You (2008)
- Valentino Kanzyani: Nueva York Remixes – Jesus Loved You (2008)
- Valentino Kanzyani: Kopa Blanca – Recon Light (2009)
- Valentino Kanzyani: We are all vacuum – Footlovers Music (2009)
- Valentino Kanzyani & Tomy DeClerque: 33 EP – Jesus Loved You (2009)
- Valentino Kanzyani: Love & Gratitude EP 1 - Cadenza (2012)
- Valentino Kanzyani: Love & Gratitude EP 2 - Cadenza (2012)
- Valentino Kanzyani: Love & Gratitude EP 3 - Cadenza (2013)
- Valentino Kanzyani: Psiamsteram - Cadenza (2014)
- Valentino Kanzyani: Primera Causa - Bla Bla (2016)
- Valentino Kanzyani: J.CS SPACE EP - Jesus Loved You (2017)

Remixes

- Traxster: Believe (Valentino Kanzyani remix) - Primate Endangered Species (2001)
- Simon Digby: Benchmark (Valentino Kanzyani Remixes) - Wetmusik (2001)
- Simon Digby: Tribal Theory (Kanzyani remix) - Bush (2001)
- Jon Carter: Humanism (Valentino Kanzyani remix) - Shine Recordings (2002)
- Steve D: Red Fever (V.K. remix) - Recycled Loops (2002)
- Steve D: Get Into The Groove (V.K. remix) - Recycled Loops (2003)
- Alek Biotic: Funk Matter (V.K. remix) - Gotham Grooves (2003)
- Martyn Hare: To The Grim (V.K. remix) - Tronic (2003)
- Boriqua Tribez: Feto (Kanzyani Edit) - Recycled Loops (2004)
- Carl Cox: Give Me Your Love (V.K. remix) - 23rd Century Records (2004)
- Hertz: Julia (V.K. remix) - Sway (2004)
- Sultan & The Greek: Rezin (Valentino Mix) - Shinichi (2004)
- Patrik Skoog: Desolation Ltd (12") Untitled (V.K. remix) Drumcode (2005)
- Chus & Penn: Esperanza (V.K. remix) - Defected (2005)
- Chus & Penn: Esperanza (V.K. remix) - Urbana Recordings (2005)
- Tonepushers: Falling (V.K. remix) - Fifth Sun Recordings (2005)
- Rob Mooney: Feelin' Electro (V.K. remix) - Punch Funk Records (2005)
- TC&P: Introvex (Valentino Ka... Thomas Christopher + Payne Recordings (2005)
- Ivan Komlinovic: Ordinary Session (V.K. remix) - Work Hard Play Hard (2005)
- Silence: Skin (V.K. remix) - Matrix Musik (2005)
- Tom Hades: Einsamheit (V.K. remix) - Rhythm Convert (2006)
- John Acquaviva & Madox: Feedback (V.K. remix) - Mantra Vibes (2006)
- Robert G Roy: So Much Better (V.K. remix) - Earresistible Musick (2006)
- M.I.K.E. - Salvation (V.K. remix) - Club Elite (2006)
- Nathan Fake: Outhouse ((V.K. remix) - Recycled Loops (2007)
- DJ Link: Salada (V.K. remix) - Amigos Recordings (2007)
- Shlomi Aber ft Lemon: Moods (V.K. remix) - Renaissance (2007)
- John Acquaviva & Madox ft Tommie Sunshine: Running From (V.K. remix) - Mantra Vibes (2007)
- Chris Barrat: Whistlechaims (Valentino Kanzyani & Tomy DeClerque Remix) – Jesus Loved You (2008)
- Cory B & Shirfy - Island (Valentino Kanzyani remix) – Titanium Records (2008)
- Jeff Bennett – In Spite (Valentino Kanzyani remix) – Kung Fu Dub Recordings (2009)
- Veztax - Whatz Up We (Valentino Kanzyani remix) – Vezotonik (2009)
- Wehbba ft. Ryo Perez – La taverna Eslovena (Valentino Kanzyani remix) – 82 Recordings (2009)
- Da Fresh - Dope Me (Valentino Kanzyani remix) - Zebra 3 (2012)
- Tish - Aloft (Valentino Kanzyani remix) - Mulen (2015)
- Vinyl Speed Adjust - The Awakening (Valentino Kanzyani remix) - Drumma Records (2015)
- Counrad - Cote D Azur Rapide (Valentino Kanzyani mirror of my soul remix) - Hopeless (2016)
- Mark Ambrose - My Soul. Your Soul (Valentino Kanzyani remix) - Murge Recordings (2016)
- Bronxy, Rata - Red Lips (Valentino Kanzyani remix) - System 108 (2019)
- Pirvu - FM (Valentino Kanzyani remix) - the-other-side (2022)

DJ Mixes:

- Rock The Discothèque (CD) - Matrix Musik (2001)
- Rock The Discothèque Vol. 2 (CD) - Matrix Musik (2003)
- Intechnique: A Continuous Mix By Valentino Kanzyani - Intec Records (2005)
- Rock The Discothèque 3 (CD) - Matrix Musik (2006)
- Palazzo - Volume Six (CD) - T:Classixx (2007)
- La Terrrazza - Atmospherical Fun Club (CD) – Circle (2009)
