= DJ Umek =

Slovenian dance music producer and DJ

- Also known as: Umek, Fotr (Father), Alba Patera, Error, Kemu, Mumps, Nuca, Polyvinyl, Ratcapa, Thorax, Tiga (2), Zeta Reticula
- Born: Uroš Umek; May 16, 1976 (age 50)
- Origin: Ljubljana, Slovenia (then SFR Yugoslavia)
- Genres: Electronic, techno, tech house
- Occupations: Disc jockey, record producer
- Years active: 1993–present
- Labels: Consumer Recreation, Recycled Loops, Earresistible Musick, Astrodisco, 1605, Spinnin' Records, Ultra Records
- Website: Official website

Uroš Umek (Slovene pronunciation: [ˈúːrɔʃ ˈúːmək]; born May 16, 1976), better known as DJ Umek or simply UMEK, is a Slovenian dance music producer and DJ. Musically active since 1993, he is the owner of several techno record labels. In 1999 he founded Consumer Recreation and Recycled Loops, the former of which he co-runs with Valentino Kanzyani. Recycled Loops formed the sublabel Earresistible Musick in 2001, and in 2007 Umek founded the large techno label 1605.

In 2010, he won Best Techno Artist at the Beatport Music Awards, and in 2013 he was named Best Techno DJ at the EMPO Awards. In 2013, he won Best Techno Track at the International Dance Music Awards, and the following year he won Best Techno/Tech House Artist. He has released singles and remixes on Spinnin' Records and Ultra Records. Since 2015 UMEK switched back to darker techno style and is now releasing mostly on his own imprint 1605.

== Career ==
=== Early years (1990s-2006) ===
Umek began DJing in 1993 at the age of 17. He was among the pioneers of the electronic music in Slovenia. In 1995 he started his first record label Veto Records in cooperation with DJ Primus and Boštjan Marušič, year later they established hard techno label Absense and in 1999 he released music on his own labels Consumer Recreation, which he co-created with Boštjan Marušič and Recycled Loops, which he co-run with Valentino Kanzyani. Umek became famous by techno-supporters in Europe about 2001, for his fast mixing skills and his uplifting dj-sets. In the later years he changed his style a little bit. In 2001 he released music on Earresistible Musick.

=== 1605 and hit singles (2006-2015) ===
External videos
- UMEK feat. Waka Flocka - Cheezin' (Official Music Video) - this music video, out on Spinnin' Records in January 2015, is somewhat divergent from UMEK's other hit singles.

In 2006 he released a single "Posing As Me," which was a big hit in Slovenia. In 2007 he did another video supported project with a Croatian singer and lyrics writer Anđa Marić Carbon Occasions, and also released music on the label 1605 Records. On his birthday May 16 he organized a musical event called Dan Elektronike (Electronica Day). He was ranked at position 29 of the TOP 100 DJs for the year 2007 by the DJ Magazine. Some people regard Umek as one of the Top 10 Techno DJs in the world. During all the subsequent years - until 2015 he managed to rank in the DJ Mag Top 100 DJs chart among the best DJs.

Year	Top 100 DJs rank
2006	#82
2007	#29
2008	#33
2009	#39
2010	#50
2011	#60
2012	#59
2013	#97
2014	#75
2015	#70

He performed an Essential Mix on BBC Radio 1 in November 2007.

In 2010, Umek released two No.1 Beatport hits: OMGWTF and "Back In the Race". He also teamed up with former Slovenian president Danilo Türk to appeal to high-school graduates not to drink alcohol on their prom dance. In March of the same year he released his second authorial album and first on his label 1605 - "Responding To Dynamic", which acquired much attention in the world of techno music.

In 2011 Umek launched his first radio show "Behind The Iron Curtain with Umek", currently present on more than 130 FM and online radio stations worldwide, where he weekly presents new talent and new music selection.

From 2012 Umek's music style switch more to tech-house and commercial waters, which got him his first performance on Tomorrowland and mainstage performance on Electric Daisy Carnival Las Vegas in 2013. He started releasing much of his music on Spinnin' Records and in the beginning of 2015 he released a collaboration with an American rapper Waka Flocka Flame, which stirred up the waters in the music industry.

=== Return to the dark side (2015-present) ===
2015 was an important year in Umek's career. He decided to return to his roots of darker techno sounds, accompanied by the revival of his old electro moniker Zeta Reticula. To power-up his label he started to release the majority of his music on 1605. He also renewed his visual identity, reflecting his darker music style.

In 2016 Umek co-founded a new music start-up company Viberate, which analyzes musicians and ranks them by their popularity and which already moved from his home city of Ljubljana to Silicon Valley. During 2016 Umek teamed up once again with Toolroom Records and released his first ever music production course, titled "Techno Masterclass with Umek", featuring 5,5 hours of quality music production tips and tricks.

On December 21, 2018, Umek celebrated 25 years of making music at the sold-out event in Ljubljana, receiving congratulations from British techno DJ and producer Carl Cox and the President of the Republic of Slovenia, Borut Pahor, among others.

=== Awards ===
Year	Award	Nominated work	Category	Result
2010	Beatport Music Awards	DJ Umek	Best Techno Artist	Won
2013	EMPO Awards	DJ Umek	Best Techno DJ	Won
2013	International Dance; Music Awards	"Goes On"	Best Techno Track	Won
2014	International Dance; Music Awards	DJ Umek	Best Techno/Tech House Artist	Won
2015	International Dance; Music Awards	"Burnfire"	Best Tech House/Techno Track	Won

== Discography ==
=== EPs ===
The following is an incomplete list of EPs released by DJ Umek:

- 24: Burnfire (with Jay Colin) (Spinnin' Records)
- 2014: All I Want (with Mike Vale) (1605)
- 2014: Sweet Harmony (with Groovebox) (Spinnin' Records)
- 2015: Cheezin' (with Waka Flocka) (Spinnin' Records)
- 2018: 19119 EP (Tronic)
- 2019: Vibrancy (1605)
- 2019: Ravaged Original Mix (1605)
- 2019: Collision Wall (1605)
- 2021: Watchers of the Sky (1605)
- 2021: Frequency differ

=== Remixes ===
The following is an incomplete list of remixes released by DJ Umek:

- 2013: Fedde Le Grand - "Metrum (UMEK Remix)" (Toolroom Records)
- 2013: Ralph Falcon - "The Dig" (Renaissance Back Catalog)
- 2013: Parov Stelar - "All Night" (1605)
- 2013: Bontan - "The Revolution (UMEK Remix)" (Kraftek)
- 2014: Chris Lake, Jareth - "Helium (UMEK & Mike Vale Remix)" (Ultra Records)
- 2020: Quench - "Dreams (UMEK Version)" (1605)tus ideas 1605
- 2021: The Thrillseekers - "Synaesthesia (UMEK Remix)" (Armada Music)
