= HBz =

German DJs and producer duo

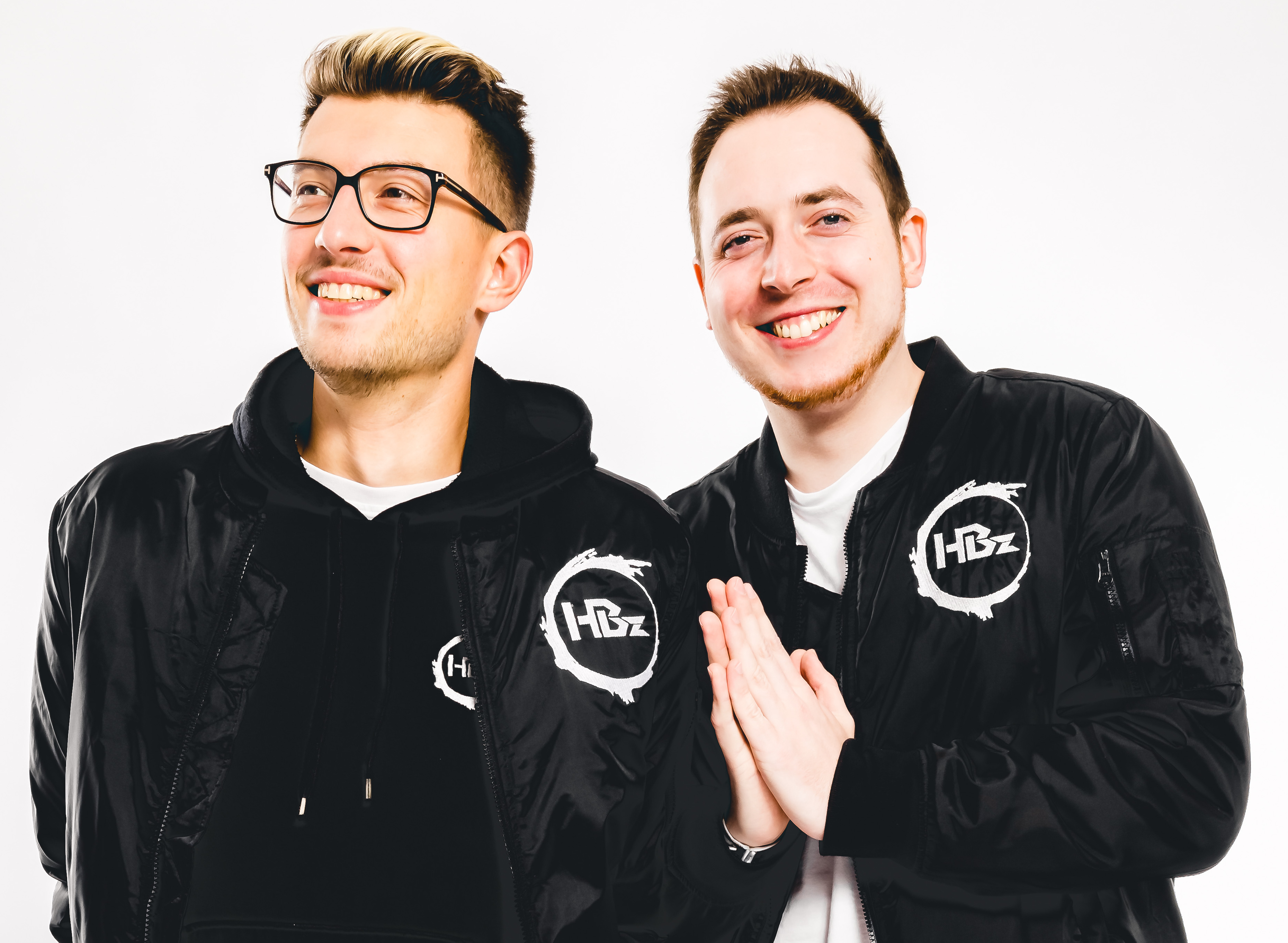
- HBz in 2022

Background information
- Origin: Lachendorf, Lower Saxony, Germany
- Genres: Electronic dance music, house, goa, hardstyle
- Occupations: DJs, producers
- Years active: 2009-current
- Members: Nils Schedler; Niklas Brüsewitz

HBz are a German DJ and production duo formed by Nils Schedler and Niklas Brüsewitz. They gained popularity through singles such as "Deine Augen" or "King Kong", as well as their remix of the song "Lebenslang". The duo collaborates with artists from various genres, including pop, hip hop, and schlager.

== History ==
Schedler and Brüsewitz, born in the mid-1990s, have known each other since kindergarten, and started making music together at the age of 13. They deliberately haven't made the origins of the name HBz public so far. At the end of 2009, they produced their first track, and in 2011, they began to appear as DJs at events.

In the following years, HBz expanded their career, both in terms of their music production and the size of their performances. According to Faze magazine, they became known by "releasing bootlegs, mixes, remixes of current hits or classics on their YouTube channel". As of October 2024, HBz's videos have been viewed over 900 million times on the platform. According to an article by the Westdeutsche Allgemeine Zeitung from early 2024, HBz are one of the ten most-listened German music artists on YouTube.

Their first EP "Deine Augen EP" was released in 2020, with the title track "Deine Augen" receiving a Golden Record in Germany. In 2021, their first two studio albums "Family" and "Urlaub" were released. The single "King Kong", released in 2021, entered the German Singles Charts on 18 June 2021. It stayed on the charts for a total of 22 weeks, peaking at position 31. In 2022, the song was certified as a golden record. Besides this, German rapper Tream released the song "Lebenslang" on HBz's music label hbzmusic. The song was awarded a platinum record in 2022 and a remix of "Lebenslang" by HBz received around 78 million plays that year alone.

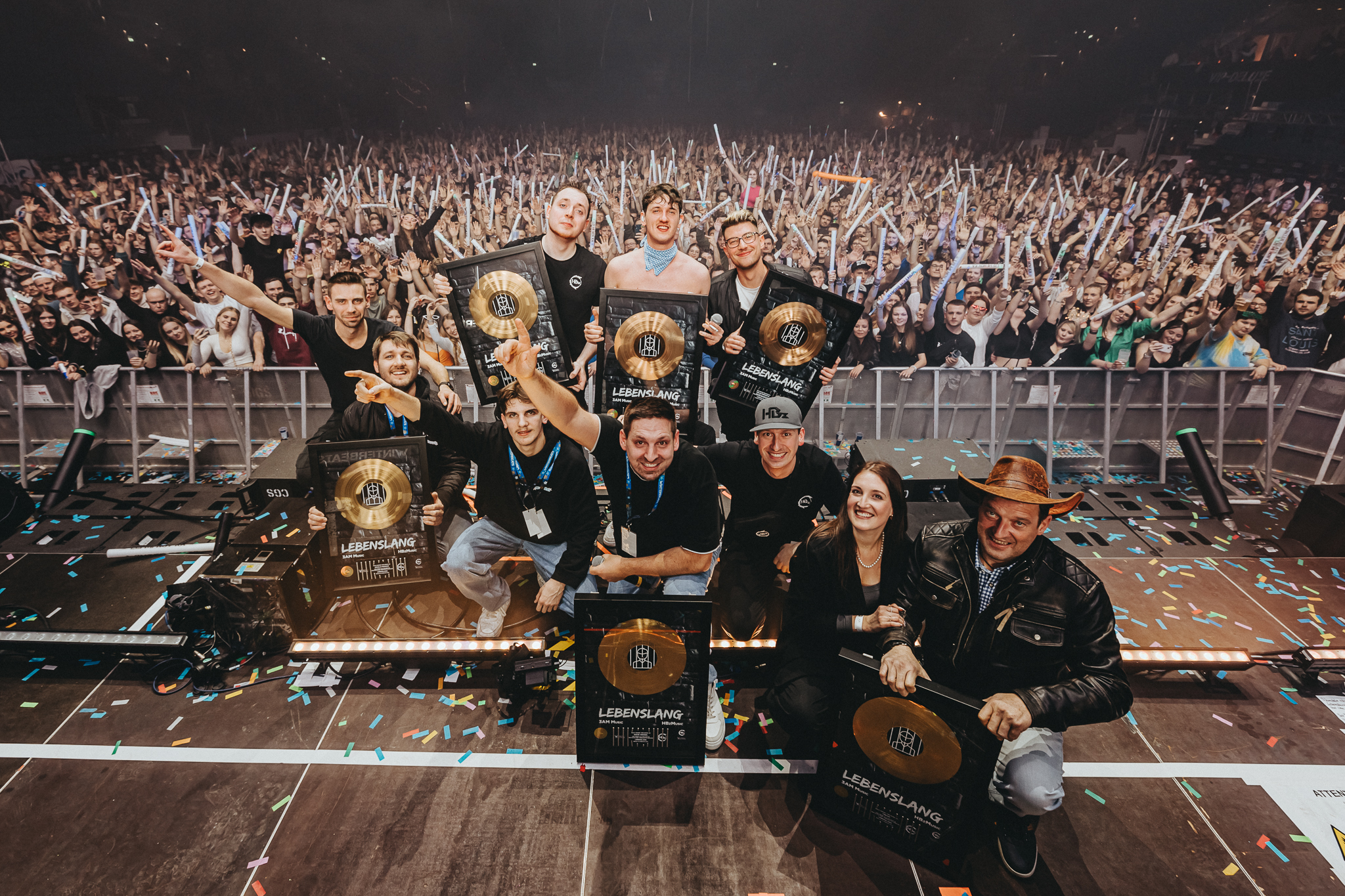
HBz and Tream at Winterbeats Festival in 2023

Another important release in 2022 was HBz's single "Hoch die Hände Wochenende" with rapper Finch and the Fäaschtbänkler. In 2023, the single "Tattoo" was released as a collaboration between HBz, the DJ duo 2 Engel & Charlie and Finch. In the same year, remixes for Blümchen's "Herz an Herz" and Marteria's "Lila Wolken" were published. In May 2023, HBz's third album, "Schmuggelware", was released, marking the first time they were able to position themselves in the German album charts.

In February 2024, "Erinner mich", a joint single with 2 Engel & Charlie, reached number 33 on the German single charts and stayed in the German charts for 16 weeks. Also in 2024, the single "Pink" was released in collaboration with pop singer Vanessa Mai.

== Appearances ==
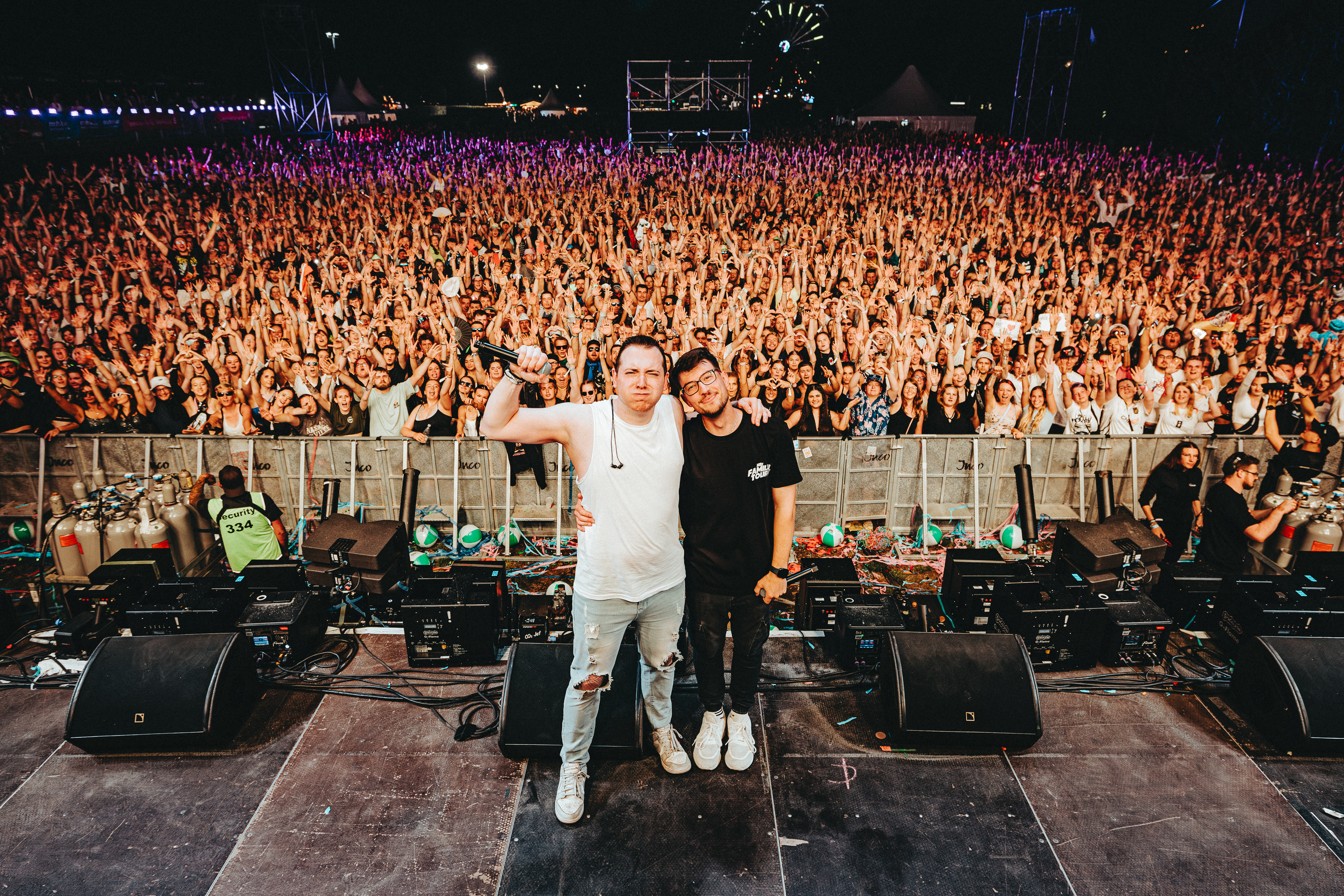
HBz at Love Music Festival in 2024

Since 2011, HBz has been performing live regularly, initially mainly on small stages. A notable performance for the duo was the Winterbeats Festival 2020, at the Saturn Arena in Ingolstadt, in which they were voted best act. Festivals they have performed at include Lollapalooza at Olympiastadion Berlin, Parookaville, Sputnik Spring Break, SonneMondSterne, Glücksgefühle Festival at Hockenheimring, Electrisize, Open Beatz Festival, and Heide Park Festival in the amusement park Heide Park. In the Veltins Arena, HBz appeared on stage at the Olé auf Schalke 2022 and also at the Olé auf Schalke 2023 in front of 40,000 people each.

== Home of Madness ==
To expand the cultural landscape in their home region, in 2017, they launched the Home of Madness Festival in Lachendorf near Celle together with a business partner. In 2018 and 2019, the festival recorded growth in visitor numbers and was expanded to include a second stage in 2019. After a hiatus of two years due to the COVID-19 pandemic, Home of Madness was extended to two days upon its resumption in 2022. In 2023, the festival had around 4,700 visitors.

== Discography ==
=== Album ===
- 2021: Family
- 2021: Urlaub
- 2023: Schmuggelware ― No. 88 GER

=== EPs ===
- 2020: Deine Augen EP (HBz X Thovi)
- 2021: 500K EP
- 2022: Home of Madness Festival EP

=== Singles ===
- 2017: Entice
- 2020: Waiting (ft. ENZO.)
- 2020: Twork (ft. Jost Music)
- 2020: Deine Augen (HBz X Thovi) ― BVMI: Gold certification
- 2021: All the Things She Said (HBz Version) (ft. Mike Gudmann und Michelle Collin)
- 2021: Drunken Sailor
- 2021: Coco Jambo (HBz x Harris & Ford x Thovi)
- 2021: King Kong – No. 31 in the German Single Charts, BVMI: Gold certification
- 2021: Urlaub
- 2022: Gästeliste +1
- 2022: I'm Okay (ft. OBS)
- 2022: Fuchs (du hast die Gans gestohlen) (ft. IIVEN & Bekkaa)
- 2022: Hoch die Hände Wochenende (ft. Fäaschtbänkler & Finch)
- 2022: Goldmarie (ft. Tream)
- 2022: Geisterbahn (ft. Pazoo & Schalldicht)
- 2022: Hamma! 2k22 (ft. Culcha Candela)
- 2022: Come on Over (ft. Hauz & Stefanie Heinzmann)
- 2022: Wolke 10 (ft. Harry)
- 2022: Bass (ft. Luzi)
- 2022: Eng Ba Day (Still Skanking) (ft. Da Hool)
- 2022: High sein (ft. 2 Engel & Charlie)
- 2022: Drop Drop Drop (ft. Thovi)
- 2022: Waste my time
- 2022: Rumble in the Jungle (ft. Jebroer)
- 2022: Spirit of the Hawk (ft. JAMYX)
- 2022: Winterbeats Anthem (ft. Slykes & Butch & Thovi)
- 2023: Nie aufhören
- 2023: TATTOO (ft. Finch & 2 Engel & Charlie) – No. 67 in the German Single Charts
- 2023: Forever (ft. ItaloBrothers & Vize)
- 2023: Time Out (ft. Kremik)
- 2023: E-Scooter Anthem (ft. Asterio & Kramsen)
- 2023: Blockflötenunterricht (ft. Mia Julia & Pottsau)
- 2023: Raveship (ft. Neptunica & MEELA)
- 2023: It Goes Like (ft. OBS)
- 2023: How You Remind Me (ft. Captain Curtis)
- 2023: No One Like You (ft. Maxomar & Enzo)
- 2023: Better Day (ft. Melody Tourist)
- 2024: Erinner mich (ft. 2 Engel & Charlie) ― No. 33 in the German Single Charts, No. 57 in the Austrian Single Charts
- 2024: Tiesto
- 2024: HDGDL (ft. MYT)
- 2024: So frei (ft. MYT)
- 2024: Believe (ft. BassWar & CaoX)
- 2024: Babylon brennt (ft. Iommi, MYT & Captain Curtis)
- 2024: Going Down (ft. Lunax, Smack & Maike)
- 2024: Pink (Vanessa Mai ft. HBz)
- 2024: Gone Forever (ft. STVW)
- 2024: Kids In Crime (ft. Sound Rush)
- 2024: Bisschen Spaß (ft. 2 Engel & Charlie & Lizot)
- 2024: Jaqueline (ft. Laurenz & Layrz)
- 2024: Bittersweet Goodbye (ft. Jerome & Robin White)

=== Remixes (selection) ===
- 2020: Schokkverliebt – Brave Mädchen (HBz Remix)
- 2021: VIZE x Tokio Hotel – White Lies (HBz Remix)
- 2021: Finch – Direkt Bock (HBz Official Remix)
- 2021: Tream – Lebenslang (HBz Remix) (DE: )
- 2021: SDP & 257ers – Scheiße baut sich nicht von alleine (Remix)
- 2022: Die Flippers – Wir sagen danke schön (HBz & Raphael Maier Remix)
- 2022: Montez – Auf & ab (HBz Remix)
- 2023: Marteria – Lila Wolken (HBz Remix)
- 2023: Wolfgang Petry – Verlieben, Verloren, Vergessen, Verzeih'n (HBz Remix)
- 2023: Blümchen – Herz an Herz (HBz Remix)
- 2023: Niklas Dee & Luca-Dante Spadafora – Mädchen auf dem Pferd (HBz x Zombic Remix)
- 2023: Finnel – Dorfkinder (HBz Remix)
- 2023: Tream – Lebenslang (STVW & HBz Remix) – BVMI: Platinum certification
- 2023: 1986zig – Meine 1 (HBz Remix)
