= Tream =

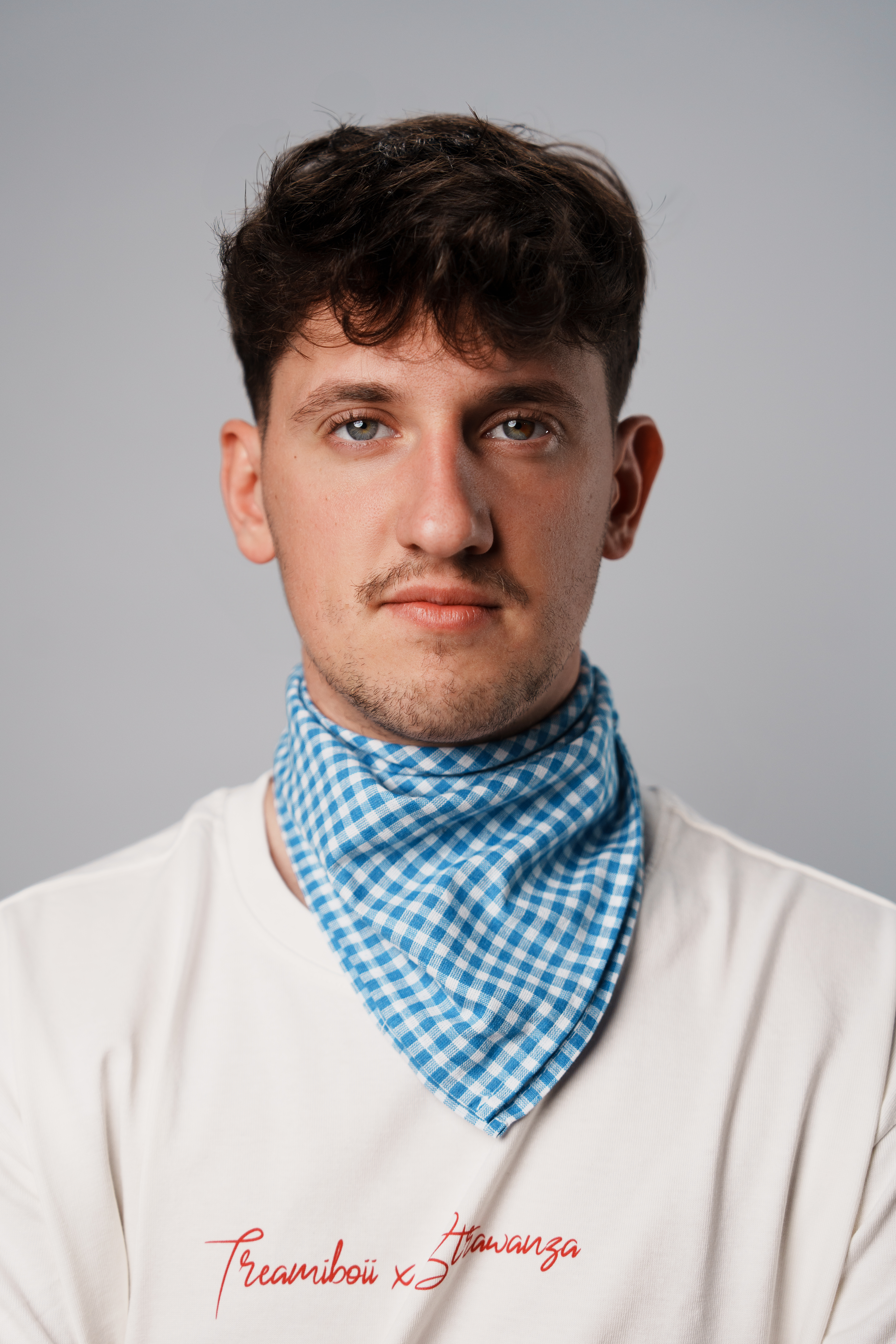
- in 2024

Background information
- Born: October 18, 1998
- Origin: Büchelkühn, Bavaria, Germany
- Genres: Electronic dance music, Schlager music, rap, Hardstyle
- Occupations: singer; rapper
- Years active: 2018–present
- Website: treami.de

Timo Grabinger (born October 18, 1998), known professionally as Tream or Tream & treamiboii, is a German rapper and singer whose musical style is also referred to as "schlager rap". He achieved his breakthrough in 2022 with the song "Lebenslang".

== Early and personal life ==
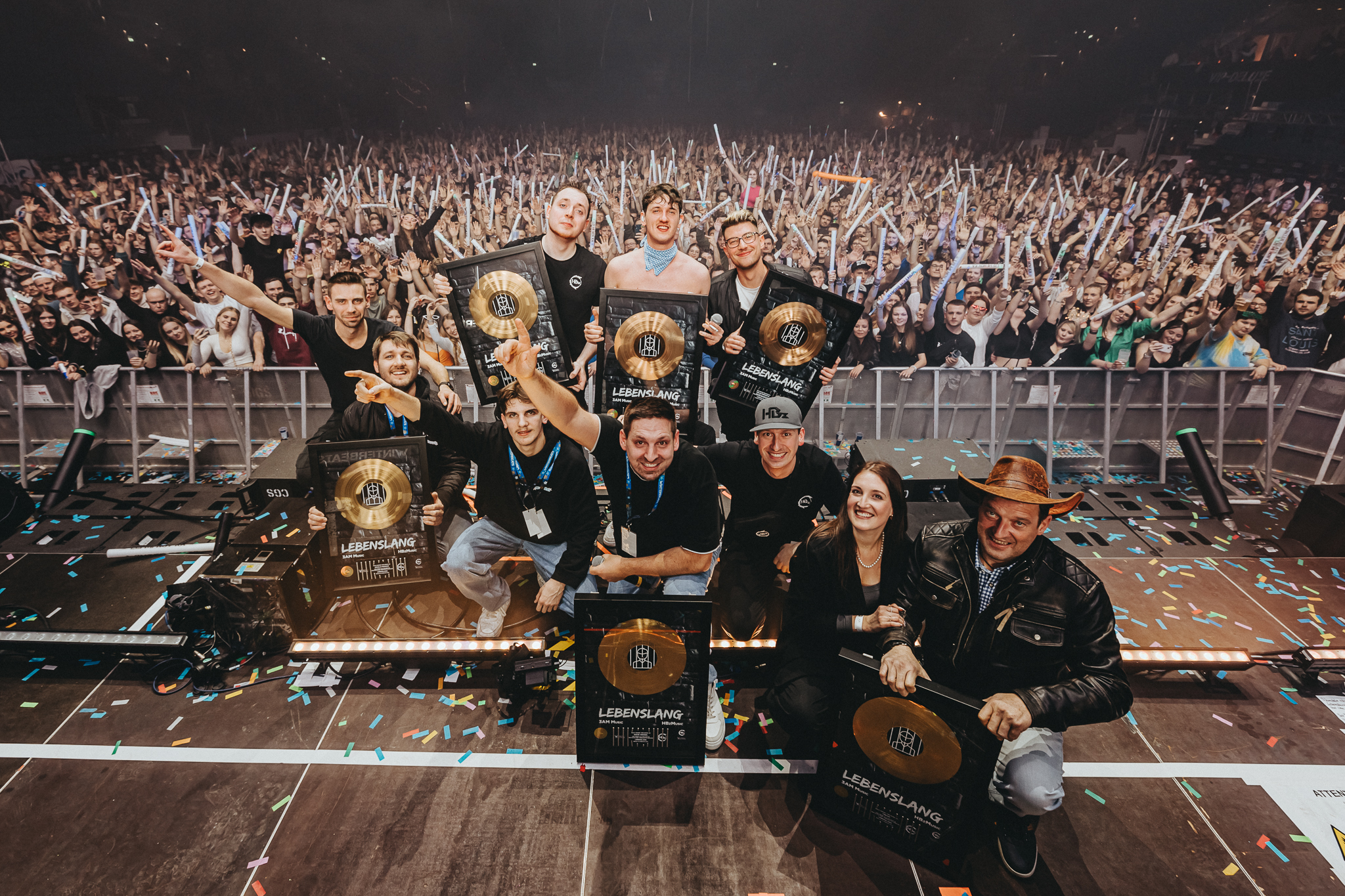
Tream (standing with scarf) with HBz at the Winterbeats Festival 2023

Grabinger was born on October 18, 1998, in Büchelkühn, a part of the Schwandorf district in Upper Palatinate, Bavaria. Tream completed a vocational training as a cook before he became a full-time musician. He has three siblings. Tream wears a white-and-blue checkered neckerchief as his trademark; white and blue are the national colours of Bavaria.

Professionally, Tream often works with friends and family. According to a 2022 report, his father handles business matters, his mother manages email inquiries, and his younger brother shoots music videos for him. During his tours, he also employs friends, for example as backstage staff or background rappers.

== Career ==
Tream learned to play the guitar at the age of ten. His stage name means "Timo‘s dream", with "T" standing for his real first name, Timo, in combination with the word "[D]ream".

On May 11, 2018, he released his debut single "Blödsinn", followed by his debut album "(S)hit" on November 3, 2018. In the following years, he released additional singles and albums without achieving any notable commercial success until 2022.

In 2022, he had his commercial breakthrough with a remix of his single "Lebenslang" by the DJ duo HBz. The song entered the Ö3 Austria Top 40 at rank 59 in mid-April 2022 and reached its highest position at rank 26 on July 19, 2022. At the end of October 2022, the song also entered the German single charts, where it peaked at position 47 in September 2023 following the release of a remix EP. Additionally, "Lebenslang" was awarded a platinum record certification for over 400,000 copies sold in Germany.

On February 24, 2023, his fifth studio album "Büchelkühn" was released, reaching the German album charts for the first time at position 37. In the summer of 2023, he reached position 32 and 14 on the German single charts with the songs "Zelten auf Kies" and "Liebe auf der Rückbank" (with Finch), respectively. In February 2024, Tream entered the top ten of the German Single Charts for the first time with the single "Herz macht bamm". This was followed by collaborations with Heino on the song "Anna" and again with Finch on "Kamikaze", both of which reached the single charts.

Tream's sixth album, "Irgendwie, Irgendwann", reached No. 4 on the album charts in December 2024. At the beginning of 2025, he entered the German Top 10 for the second time with the song "Herzblatt (aua aua)", a collaboration with Mia Julia.

== Tours and performances ==
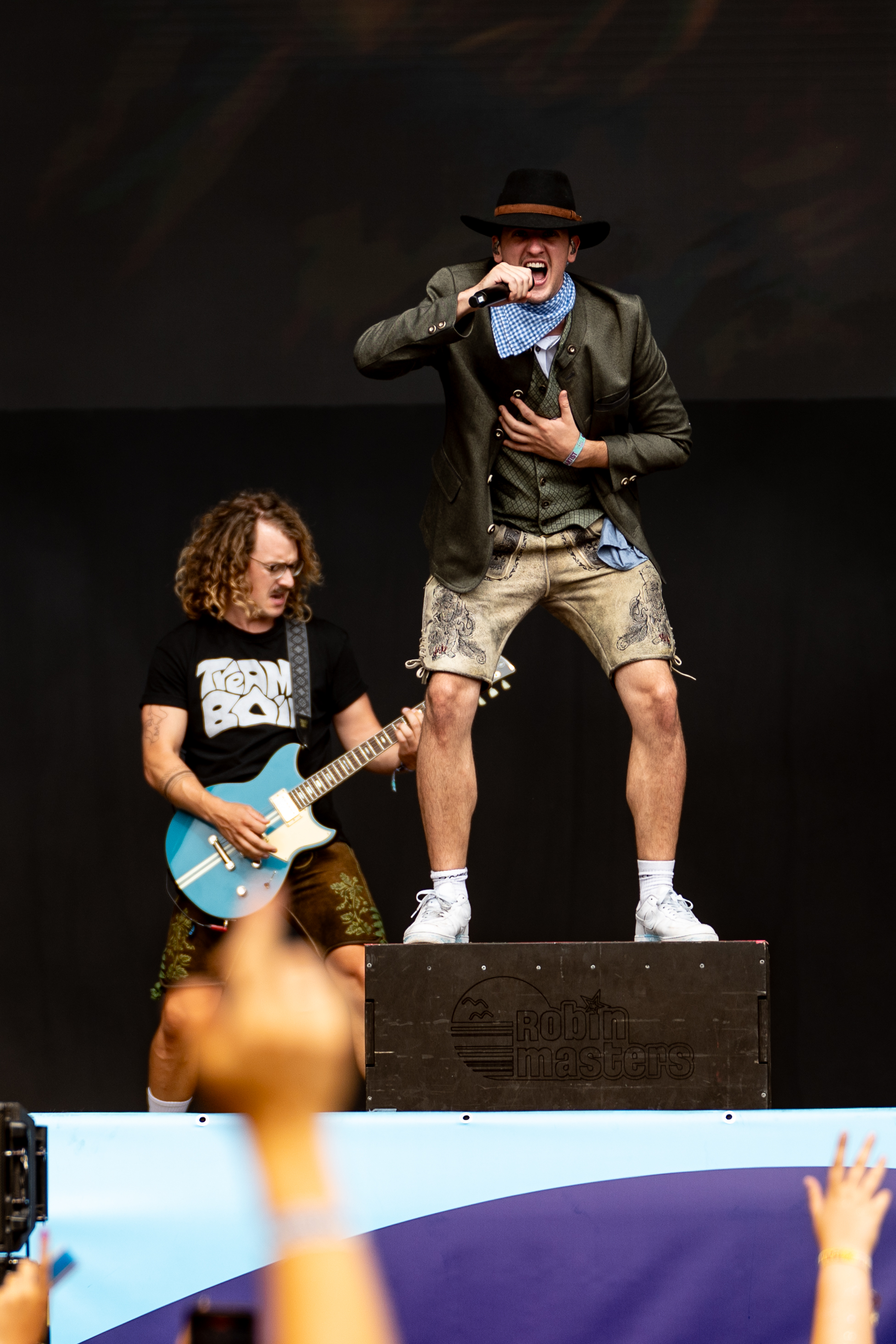
Tream at the Superbloom Festival 2024

In 2023, Tream played his first tour, titled "Kneipentour", which included a total of 19 performances and was sold out. On December 31, 2023, he performed at ZDF's New Year's Eve Show at the Brandenburg Gate. In September 2024, Tream initiated and performed a benefit concert for the victims of the 2024 Central European floods, raising 32,000 euros.

In the fall of 2024, he embarked on the "Biergarnitour" tour, selling around 100,000 tickets. As of September 2024, all but one concert were sold out. The tour's finale took place on December 14, 2024, at the Olympiahalle Munich, featuring guest appearances by Heino, Bausa, Mia Julia, Marc Eggers, and a children's choir performing the song "Superstars".

In addition to his own tours, Tream performs at festivals such as Parookaville, Frequency, Superbloom Festival at the Olympiastadion Munich, Sputnik Springbreak, and Deichbrand.

== Music style ==
Tream calls himself "Germany's first schlager rapper", as he was among the first to blend electronic schlager and rap music in his song "Verliebt verloren". His earlier releases still featured elements of cloud rap, while songs like "Lebenslang", "Hinters Bierzelt", "Goldmarie", or "3er BMW" musically fall somewhere between rap, schlager, electronic dance music, and hardstyle.

Tream produces most of his songs himself, also incorporating samples from well-known tracks like "Around the World (La La La La La)" or "Maniac". He writes his lyrics himself. The content often revolves around themes like alcohol, women and love stories, cars, rural life, and home. However, he also addresses other topics at times, such as children's fears about the future in "Superstars" from 2024. He describes his style as follows: "I talk about my life and my personality. It's not all clean and flawless, but it's damn honest. I also love to provoke ironically."

== Discography ==
=== Albums ===
List of studio albums
Title	Album details	Peak chart position
Title	Album details	GER
(S)hit	2018	–
Trash	2019	–
Verliebt verloren	2020	–
Rocker	2021	–
Büchelkühn	2023, 3AM Music	37
Irgendwie, irgendwann	2024, 3AM Music	4

=== EPs ===
- 2021: Me, Myself & I
- 2021: Summer Treams

=== Selected singles ===
List of singles, showing year released and album name
Title	Year	Peak chart positions		Certifications
Title	Year	GER	AUT	Certifications
"Lebenslang"	2022	47	26	BVMI: Platinum
"Goldmarie (with HBz)"	2022	—	—	—
"Zelten auf Kies"	2023	32	47	BVMI: Gold
"Liebe auf der Rückbank" (Finch featuring Tream)	2023	14	19	BVMI: Platinum; Swiss Hitparade: Gold
"Weinst du"	2023	65	—	
"7 Sünden"	2024	68	66	
"Herz macht bamm"	2024	5	15	
"Superstars"	2024	19	32	
"Anna" (featuring Heino)	2024	59	29	
"Kamikaze"	2024	29	47	
"Dieser Sommer"	2024	27	33	
"Gespenster"	2024	63	46	
"Herzblatt" (featuring Mia Julia)	2025	8	7	
