= Sea of Love =

Sea of Love may refer to

- Sea of Love (film), a 1989 American thriller film
- "Sea of Love" (Phil Phillips song), a 1959 song by Phil Phillips and The Twilights, covered by many performers
- Sea of Love, a 1992 song by Ken Melville from It Came From the Desert port for TurboGrafx-CD
- "Sea of Love" (The National song), 2013
- The Sea of Love, a 1988 album by the Adventures
- Sea of Love, a 2002 album by Fly to the Sky
- Sea of Love, a 2022 animated Netflix children's series by Juck Somsaman
- Sea of Love (festival), now the See You Festival, an annual techno music festival in Freiburg im Breisgau, Germany
