= Heino =

German schlager singer (born 1938)

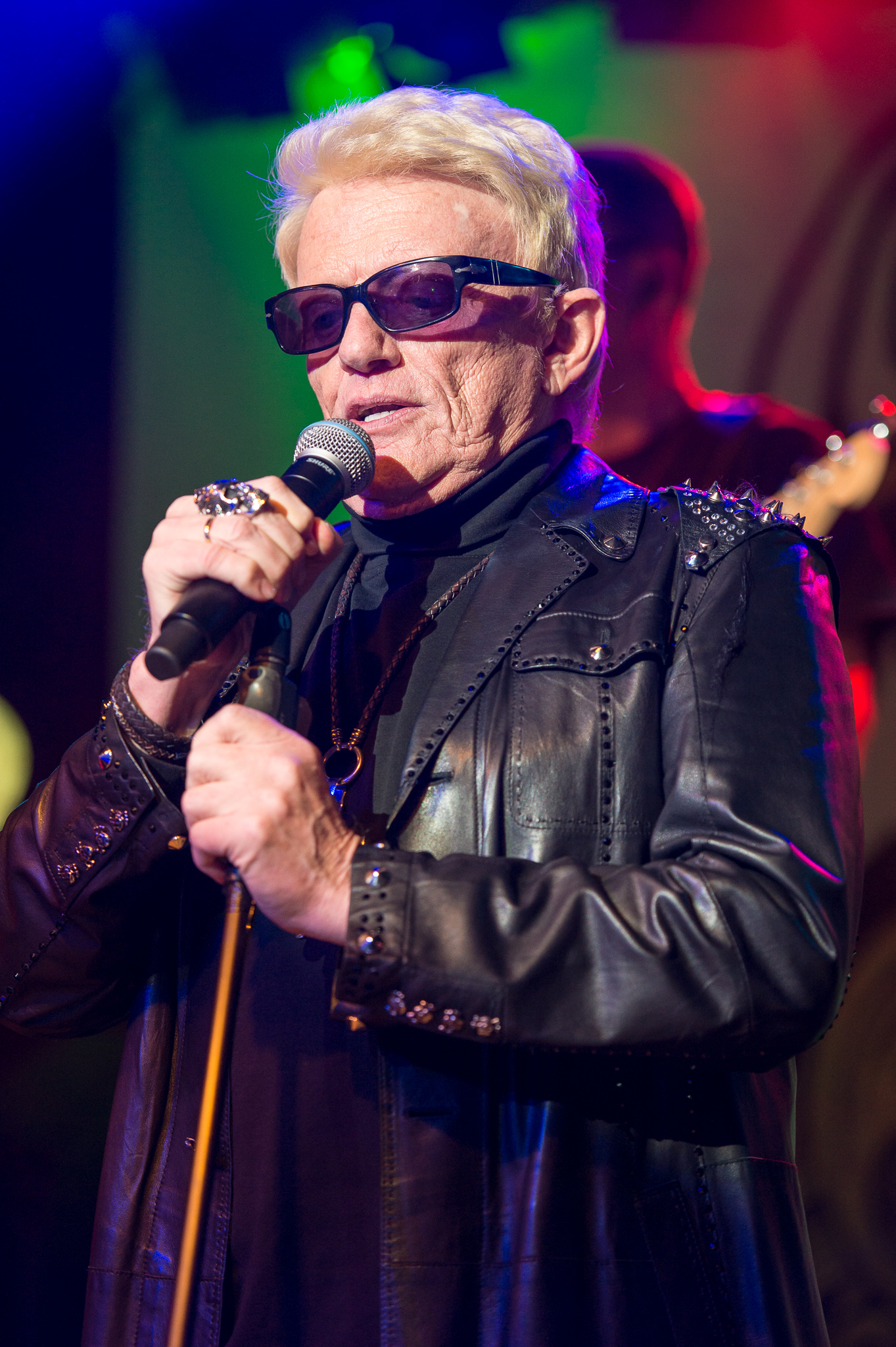
- Heino in 2015

Background information
- Born: Heinz Georg Kramm; 13 December 1938 (age 87); Gau Düsseldorf, German Reich
- Genres: Schlager, Volksmusik
- Years active: 1961–present
- Website: heino.de

Heinz Georg Kramm (born 13 December 1938), known professionally as Heino, is a German singer of Schlager and traditional Volksmusik. Having sold a total of over 50 million records, he is one of the most successful German musicians of all time.

Heino is known for his baritone voice and trademark combination of light blond hair and dark sunglasses (which he wears due to exophthalmos). He lives in the town of Bad Münstereifel, where he owned a café until June 2012. His interest in music started at age 10 when his mother gave him an accordion in 1948, although his family could barely afford it.

== Early life ==
Heino was born on 13 December 1938 in Düsseldorf-Oberbilk, Germany, to Heinrich and Franziska Kramm. His father was a Roman Catholic dentist, his mother a Protestant. His grandfather was the organist at the Cathedral of Cologne. He also had two cousins who were Catholic priests. Heino's father was drafted into the German army during World War II, and was killed on 2 August 1941 during the invasion of the Soviet Union.

Until 1945, Heino lived with his mother and his older sister Hannelore in Pomerania. In 1945 he began school in Großenhain (Saxony). After 1952 he went to Düsseldorf where he initially trained as a baker and confectioner.

== Career ==
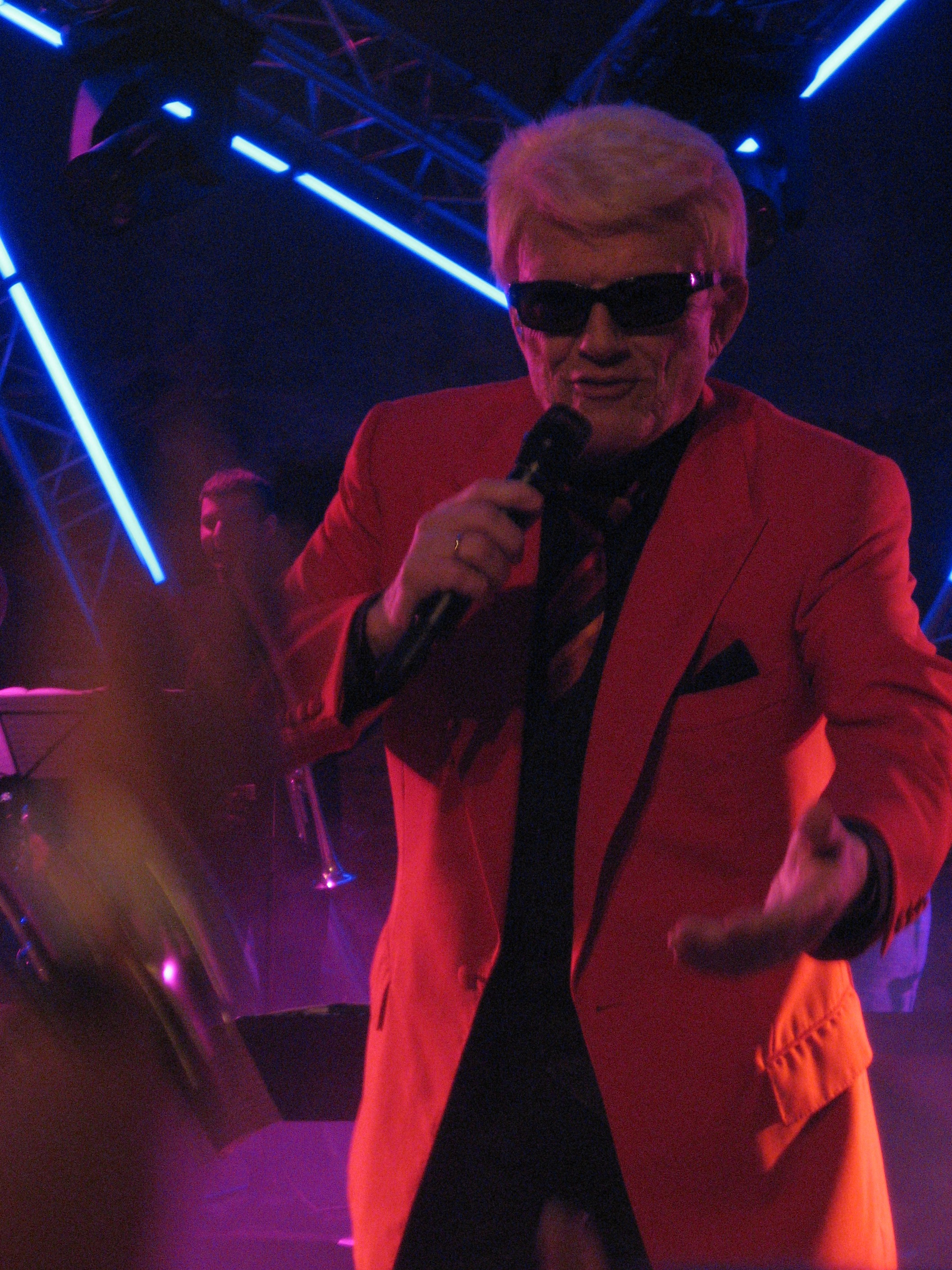
Heino in 2009

His stage name comes from his sister Hannelore's difficulty pronouncing his given name "Heinz Georg".

In 1961, he first appeared in the trio OK Singers. Heino achieved fame in the mid-1960s and has charted numerous times since then in the German music charts. He also appeared regularly in German television shows such as ZDF-Hitparade, Musikantenstadl and ZDF-Fernsehgarten. Most of his recordings were pop versions of traditional folk songs; for example in "Blau blüht der Enzian" ("Blue Blooms the Gentian"), one of his signature songs and an adaptation of the folk song "Das Schweizermadel" ("The Swiss Maiden").

In February 2013, Heino released a new album, called "Mit freundlichen Grüßen" (With Friendly Greetings), which topped the German album charts. It was the first Number-one-album for him in Germany. The record is a collection of cover versions of popular German songs from Die Ärzte, Peter Fox, Rammstein and others. It is as such a Pop-Rock/Metal-record instead of Heino's typical Schlager and Volksmusik style. The album earned Gold for being sold over 100,000 times.

In December 2014, Heino released a new album, "Schwarz blüht der Enzian" (Black blooms the Gentian), referring to one of his greatest hits "Blau blüht der Enzian" (Blue Blooms the Gentian) and to the Rock-/Metal style of the record in which some of his own songs and traditional German Volksmusik are covered.

In November 2016, Heino announced the release of his new Christmas album, "Mit weihnachtlichen Grüßen" (With Christmas greetings), which includes a duet with fellow singer Sarah Jane Scott.

After a 50-year career, Heino announced on 30 September 2018 his final tour in 2019 and the release of his final album "...und Tschüss, das letzte Album" (...and bye, the final album). The album consists of 36 songs which are mainly his traditional German folk songs which made him famous. However, he later announced a tour for the autumn of 2020 in which he performed classic music. In September 2023, he released the album Lieder meiner Heimat ("Songs of My Homeland"), featuring cover versions of partyschlager hits.

In 2024, Heino collaborated with the schlager rapper Tream on the single "Anna", which entered the German singles chart at number 59 and stayed for one week. In July 2024, Heino appeared as a special guest at the Parookaville festival. In August 2024, he gave three concerts in the United States, mainly for German-American audiences. In 2025, it was announced that the Bierkönig venue, a venue notorious for German party tourists in Mallorca. had booked Heino for six performances in 2025. He performed there several more times in 2026. According to media reports, his contract in Mallorca can be extended until his 100th birthday. In 2025 and 2026, Heino played around 100 dates on his solo tour Made in Germany.

== Personal life ==
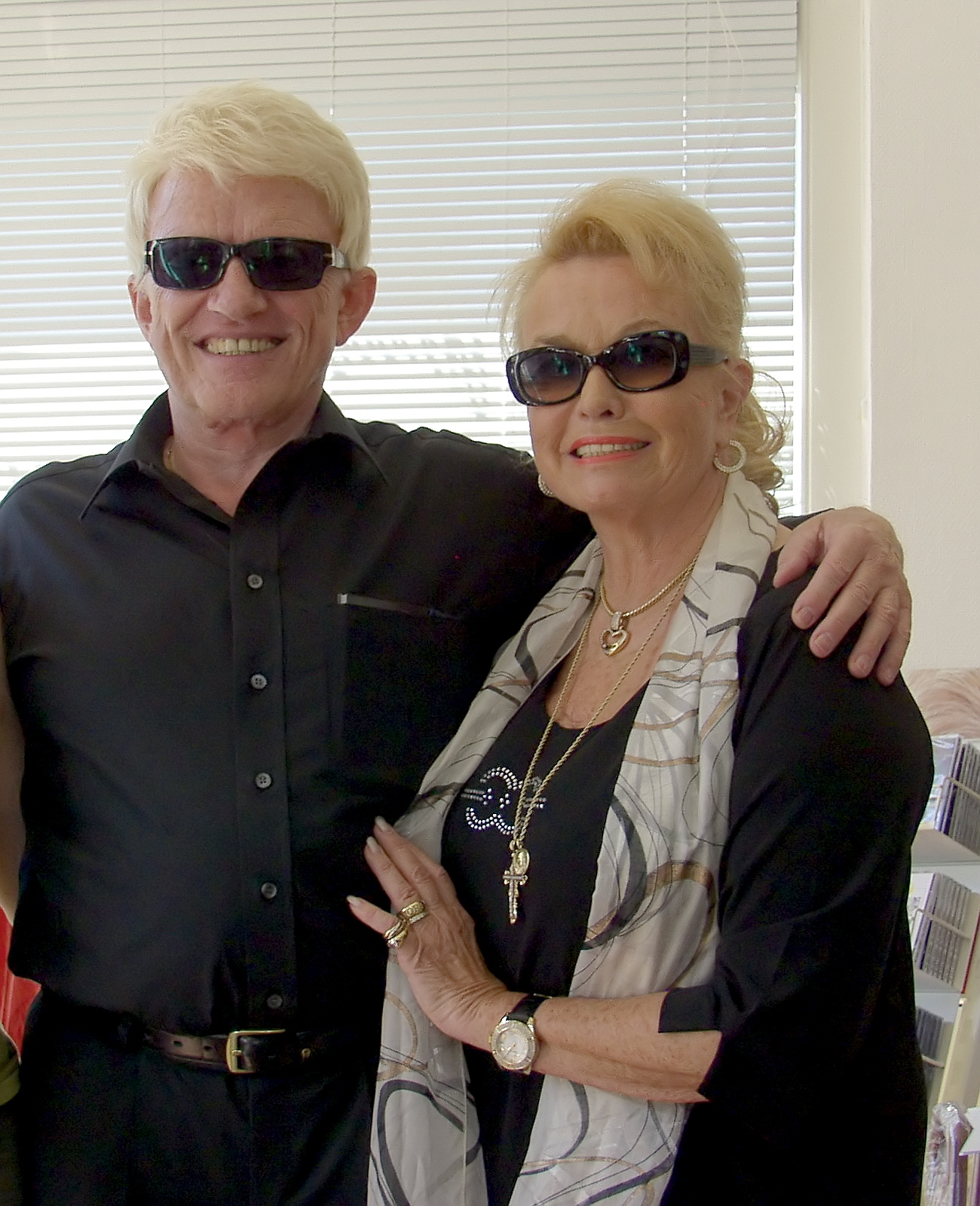
Heino with his wife Hannelore in 2008

In June 1959 he married 18-year-old Henriette Heppner. They had one son, Uwe, born in 1962, and subsequently divorced. He married his second wife, Lilo Kramm, in 1965; their marriage ended in divorce in 1978. Lilo died of cancer on 28 January 2010.

In 1968, he became the father of an illegitimate daughter named Petra after an affair with a woman named Karin. Petra had schizophrenia, for which she received treatment. She committed suicide by suffocation in 2003, as her mother had in 1988. Heino opined that “she was trapped in her own world and could no longer participate in normal life."

Heino met his third wife, Hannelore Auersperg, in 1973 at the Miss Austria contest in Kitzbühel. They were married in April 1979, and she became his manager. The couple live in Bad Münstereifel. In 2004, Hannelore suffered a heart attack, which was one reason Heino curtailed his career. The marriage lasted until her death in 2023.

Heino has noticeable exophthalmos due to Graves' disease. For this reason, he always wears very dark glasses in public, which have become part of his trademark appearance. In a 2014 German newspaper story Heino was quoted as saying that he feels "naked" without them and that he had put in his will that he was to be buried with them on. Due to his light hair and skin, some initially believed he wore the glasses due to albinism.
