= Sea You Festival =

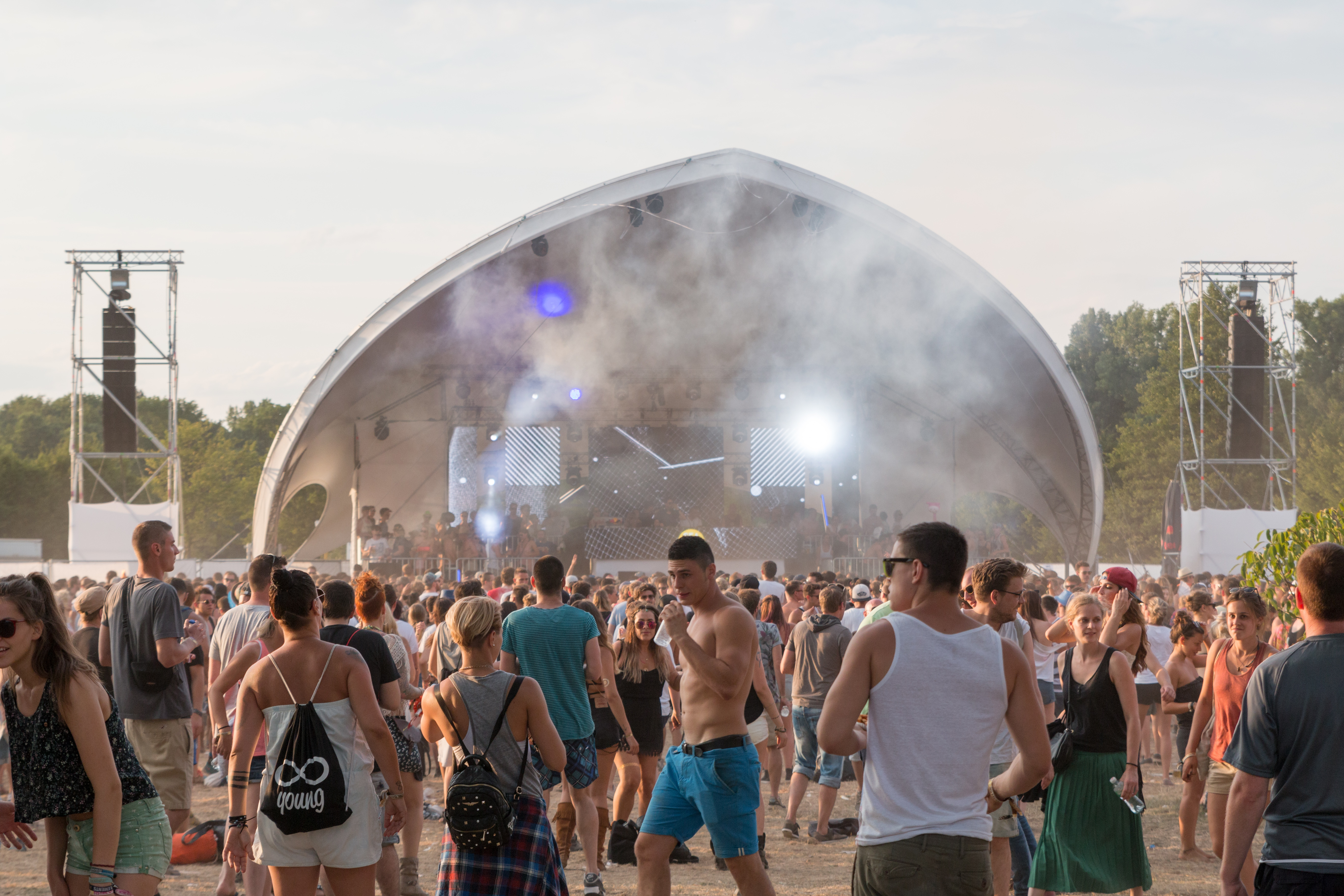
- Stage 2 during the performance of Maceo Plex in 2015
- Genre: Techno
- Location: Freiburg im Breisgau
- Country: Germany
- Years active: 2002 – 2012; 2014 – present
- Attendance: 27,000 (2017)
- Organiser: Sea You Freiburg GmbH
- Website: Official website

The Sea You Festival (formerly Sea of Love) is a techno music festival that has taken place at Tunisee in Freiburg im Breisgau since 2002.

== History ==
=== Sea of Love ===
In 2002, the Sea of Love Festival, which was initially organised by the company Endless Event, garnered an audience of over 2,500 people. Sven Väth was the headline act. It ran as a one-day festival, however after 2004 one of the organisers, Bela Gurath, came up with the idea of making it a festival run across several days. In 2005 the artists Monika Kruse and DJ Rush headlined. The latter also headlined when the festival was still held over only one day (along with Felix da Housecat, Tiefschwarz and Turntablerocker).

In 2007 there was a stage that towered over the lake and another one set up in a tent. The headliners that year were The Disco Boys, Moguai and Moonbootica. After that the festival was confined to a Sunday. Furthermore, in 2008 when the headliners Felix da Housecat and Lexy (of Lexy & K-Paul) had to cancel due to illness, Monika Kruse and Tiefschwarz were then again called upon to headline. In 2009 a few previous headliners played for a crowd of over 6,000 people. In 2010 the festival ran, for the first time, over two days. On Saturday 2raumwohnung, Paul Kalkbrenner, Chris Liebing and Die Fantastischen Vier, played and on the Sunday 2Many DJs, Tiga, Karotte, Lexy & K-Paul, Marco Petralia and many more played. The number of festival goers rose to 15,000 in 2010.

At the end of 2010 well known artists such as Moby, Tiësto, Paul Kalkbrenner, Robyn und DJ Rush were named as headliners to celebrate the festival's ten-year run in 2011. For the first time the festival was spread across three days and was therefore the second biggest music festival in Baden Wuerttemberg (after the Southside Festival). The audience numbers for the festival "Rock am See" fell from 23,000 to 13,000 but stabilised again in the years following to 25,000.

However, during the festival in 2011 the organisers were faced with huge problems: the event held on Friday evening in the Rothaus Arena of the Messe Freiburg was almost full with 6,500 spectators and as a result further 2,000 spectators were refused entry. According to data from the police, who later evacuated the Messe, the organisers hadn't complied with health and safety regulations. The camping grounds were also already overcrowded. At the time, parking places in front of various retail stores were blocked and the site for the papal visit "Baustelle für den Papstbesuch" was also damaged.

On Saturday evening there was confusion among festival goers over the rules of entry into the Messe, as an additional ticket was necessary. While the festival grounds had 25,000 spectators, the arena only permitted 13,000. The shuttlebus to the festival travelled through a tunnel, which reminded a lot of people of the incident at the Loveparade in 2010. This resulted in a lot of people travelling on foot to the Messe and roughly 40 of those people crossed the A5 motorway. The city council explained after the festival that they would have nothing more to do with the organiser as they couldn't, in their opinion, keep the event under control.

=== Sea of Love (New Management) ===
By the end of 2011 it was common knowledge that the previous organisers had sold the rights to the event to the concert group KOKO &DTK Entertainment and had even been threatened with a fine which was later set at 100,000 euros. Koko announced that they wanted to stage the festival exclusively at Tunisee. In 2012 20,000 visitors were expected at the festival which ran between 14 and 15 July, in reality 15,000 people attended over the two days to see artists such as Deichkind or Gorillaz Sound System. In December 2012 it was revealed that KOKO & DTK Entertainment wouldn't be organizing any more Sea of Love festivals on the same scale.

At the end of 2012, as a result of the circumstances in 2011, the Freiburg city council decided on how to organise future events and also came up with the idea of establishing an event management office in the first few months of 2013. This was approved at the municipal council meeting of 16 April 2013 for the Public Order Office.

=== Sea You ===
In July 2014 the Sea of Love festival was held on a smaller scale under the new name 'Sea You' and was restricted to around 10,000 visitors. The organisers were the events group "Cosmopop". On 18 and 19 July 2015 the festival was held for the second time under the new name and management, attracting over 15,000 spectators.

== Line-up ==
Year	Headliner	Date	Audience numbers	Name/Organiser of the event
2002	Sven Väth		2.500	Sea of Love; Endless Event
2003	DJ Rush, Marco Carola, Mas Ricardo, Tom Novy	27 July 2003		Sea of Love; Endless Event
2004	Chris Liebing, Tom Novy, Turntablerocker	13 June 2004		Sea of Love; Endless Event
2005	DJ Rush, Monika Kruse, Karotte, Moguai, Mr. Mike	19 June 2005		Sea of Love; Endless Event
2006	Felix da Housecat, DJ Rush, Turntablerocker, Tiefschwarz, Marco Bailey, Milk & Sugar	16 July 2006		Sea of Love; Endless Event
2007	DJ Hell, Tiefschwarz, Moguai, The Disco Boys, Moonbootica, Monika Kruse, DJ Murphy	24 June 2007		Sea of Love; Endless Event
2008	Felix da Housecat (abgesagt), Tiefschwarz, Lexy (abgesagt) & K-Paul, Monika Kruse, DJ Murphy	13 July 2008		Sea of Love; Endless Event
2009	Digitalism, Turntablerocker, Lexy & K-Paul, Tiefschwarz, Anthony Rother, Monika Kruse, The Disco Boys, Guru Josh Project, Marco Petralia	28 June 2009	6,000	Sea of Love; Endless Event
2010	Die Fantastischen Vier, 2manydjs, Paul Kalkbrenner, DJ Hell, Boys Noize, Fedde le Grand, Chris Liebing, Stromae, 2raumwohnung, Tiga, Turntablerocker	17 & 18 July 2010	15,000	Sea of Love; Endless Event
2011	Moby, Paul Kalkbrenner, David Guetta, Tiësto	15, 16 & 17 July 2011	25,000	Sea of Love; Endless Event
2012	Gorillaz, Deichkind	14 & 15 July 2012	15,000	Sea of Love; KOKO & DTK Entertainment
2013	Event not held			
2014	z. B. Ben Klock, Chris Liebing, Extrawelt, Lexy & K-Paul, Loco Dice, Luciano, Moonbootica, Nina Kraviz, Oliver Schories, Richie Hawtin, Robin Schulz	18, 19 & 20 July 2014	10,000	Sea You Festival; Cosmopop
2015	Carl Cox, Joseph Capriati, Len Faki, Maceo Plex, Nina Kraviz, Robin Schulz, Sven Väth	18 & 19 July 2015	14,000	Sea You Festival; Cosmopop
2016	Chris Liebing, Jamie Jones, Joris Voorn, Len Faki, Luciano, Monika Kruse, Nina Kraviz, Robin Schulz, Sven Väth, Tale Of Us	16 & 17 July 2016	20,000	Sea You Festival; Cosmopop
2017	z. B. Adam Beyer, Alle Farben, Boris Brejcha, Gestört aber GeiL, Klaudia Gawlas, Len Faki, Lexy & K-Paul, Loco Dice, Monika Kruse, Paul Kalkbrenner	15 & 16 July 2017	27,000	Sea You Festival; Cosmopop
2018	z. B. Adam Beyer, Alle Farben, Boris Brejcha, Charlotte de Witte, Klaudia Gawlas, Len Faki, Lexy & K-Paul, Marco Carola, Monika Kruse, Vini Vici	14 & 15 July 2018		Sea You Festival; Cosmopop
