= SonneMondSterne =

Music festival in Germany

Coordinates: 50.5075°N 11.7194°E

- Genre: Electronic dance music
- Dates: 2nd weekend of August
- Locations: Bleilochtalsperre, Saalburg-Ebersdorf, Thuringia, Germany
- Years active: 1997–present
- Website: Official website

The SonneMondSterne Festival (short SMS) is an open-air festival featuring electronic dance music held in Germany. The festival lasts three days and takes place on the second weekend of August in Thuringia at the Bleilochtalsperre near Saalburg-Ebersdorf.

The first festival was in 1997 with 2,500 people. The 15th festival in 2011 reached 35,000.

To reduce the time in between the festivals the organizer started the Wintercircus in 2001 and 2002 which took place in February. Due to the success of Wintercircus they moved it in April 2003 and renamed it to SonneMondSterne presents Camp Music. 2004 was the last Camp Music.

Since 2007 every festival is named with an additional "X", it stands for the Roman numeral ten. Therefore 2007 was as SMS.X1 the eleventh event.

== Accommodation ==
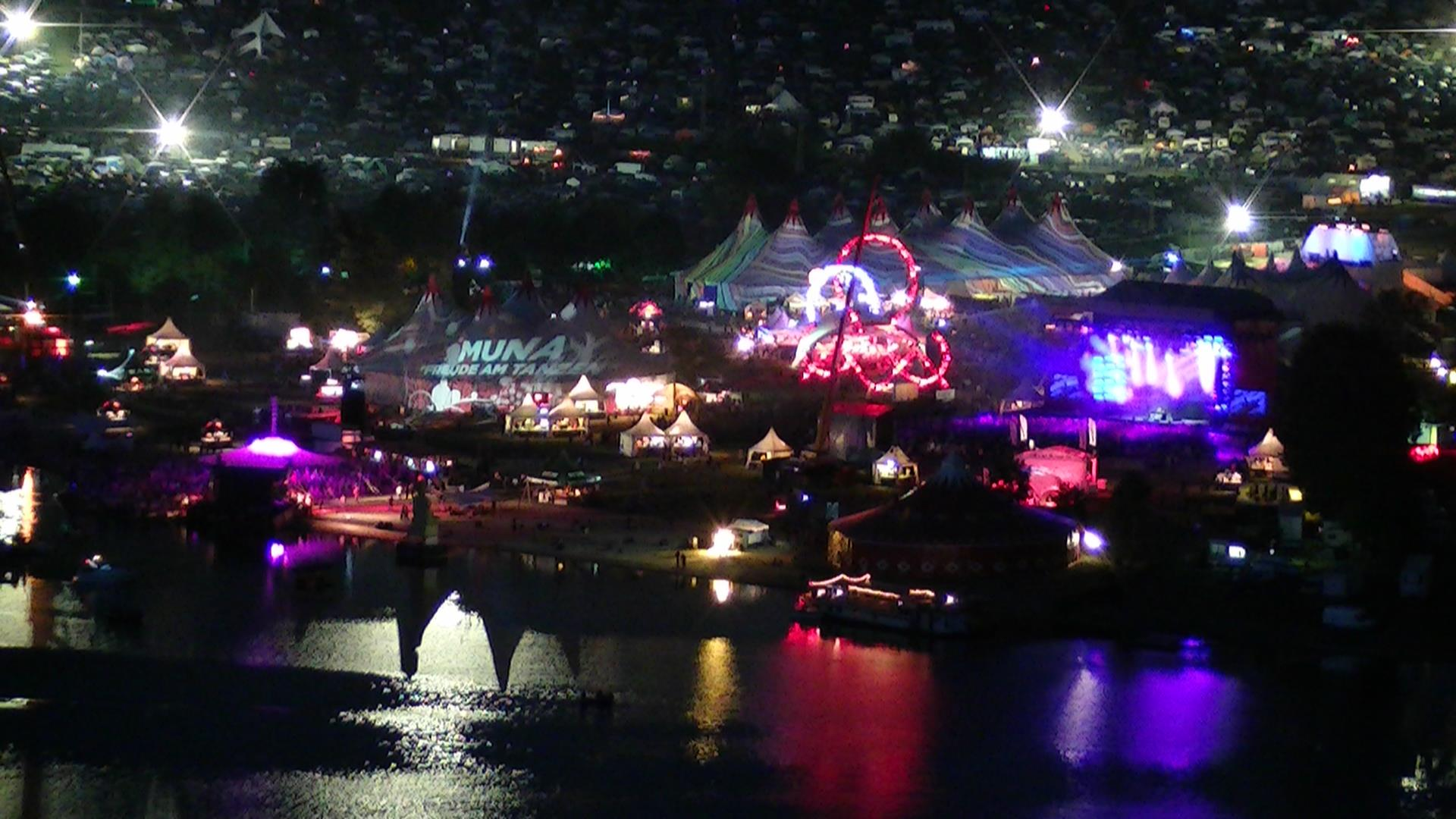
Part of the festival site at night, 2011

The festival area contains two main stages, four club tents, nine bars, three restaurants, one supermarket, two non food markets, a party boat and a merchandise shop. Camping around the festival area is free of charge because the ticket price includes a camping fee. Fans can choose between a quiet camping area or a loud camping area, depending on the distance between the festival area and the camping space.

== Headliners ==
1997
DJ Pierre, Jesse Saunders, Kenny Larkin, Future Funk, Karotte, Elektro, Kay, Mirko, Foch, Andrew, Partyersatzamt, Gregor, Andreas Kraushaar

1998
Sven Väth, Tyree Cooper, Daz Sound, Future Funk, Trevor Rockcliffle, Steve Bug, Pierre, Sven U.K., Elektro, Rozat Buzz, Boon&Koop, Kay, Green, E.B.

1999
The Advent (live), Thomas Schumacher (live), Rob Acid (live), Der Dritte Raum (live), Steve Bug, Josh Wink, Tanith, Daz Sound, Eric Powel, Miss Yetti, Pierre, Future Funk, Sven U.K., d.Hoerste, E.B., Green, Boon, Sog

2000
Hell, Johannes Heil, Future Funk, Westbam, Ken Ishii, Hans Nieswand, Erobique, Egoexpress, Chris Liebing, Milk&Sugar, Daz Saund, Colin Dale

2001
Luke Slater (live), Richie Hawtin, Sofa Surfers (live), DJ Rush, Chris Liebing, Zombie Nation (live), Steve Bug, Patrick Lindsey, Turntablerocker + Band (live), Milk & Sugar (live), DJ Koze, Phoneheads feat. MC Ronin, Tanith, Tom Novy feat. Lima, Michael Mayer, Melih Ask, Northern Lite (live), Marco Remus

2002
Alexander Kowalski feat. Raz Ohara (live), Dapayk (live), Alter Ego (live), Anthony Rother (live), Aril Brikha (live), Angeldust & Racoon, Deph, Dominik Devereo & Niklas on Sax, Ellen Allien, Floppy (live), Glenn vs. Plastic, Green Velvet (live), Abdamon

2003
Moloko, Kosheen, Matthew Herbert Big Band, Junkie XL, 2raumwohnung, Elektrochemie LK feat. Caitlin Devlin, Console, International Pony, Johannes Heil, Autotune, Justus Köhncke & Band, Phantom/Ghost, Telemen Hanson & Schrempf, Dapayk, Metaboman, Fuzzel, Sven Väth, Richie Hawtin, Westbam, Timo Maas, DJ Rush, Chris Liebing, Bad Boy Bill,

2004
Green, Pitchtuner LIVE, MIA. LIVE, Alter Ego LIVE, The Orb LIVE, The Chemical Brothers LIVE, Carl Cox, Richie Hawtin vs. Ricardo Villalobos, D.Hoerste a.k.a. White Horse, Standent Elise, Windy, Apollo ft. MC Mace, Contravibe LIVE ft. MC Massiw le Gahza, Shimon, D.Bridge (Bad Company), Studio 45 LIVE, Rec de Weirl, Anja Schneider, Abteilung Ton LIVE,

2005
Ada LIVE, Al, Alex Smoke LIVE, Alter Ego LIVE, Ame, Andreas Dorau LIVE, Anja Schneider, Basteroid LIVE, Benjamin Diamond LIVE, Blame, C.H.R.I.S., d.hoerste a.k.a. White Horse, Abteilung Ton LIVE, André Galuzzi, Andy C, Base, Cat, Dan Drastic, Daniel Stefanik LIVE + DJ, Defcon, Deichkind LIVE, Deph, Derrick Porter, Die Fantastischen Vier LIVE, DJ DSL, DJ T., DJ Tease, Drack, Electric Sun

2006
Kraftwerk, Basement Jaxx, Audio Bullys, Westbam und Band, Annie, Deichkind, Rex the Dog, Johannes Heil, Tobi Neumann, Scissor Sisters, Der Dritte Raum, Sven Väth, Paul van Dyk, Turntablerocker, Chris Liebing, DJ Hell, DJ Koze, Moguai, Carl Craig, Ricardo Villalobos, Moonbootica, James Zabiela, Toni Rios, Pascal FEOS, Frank Lorber

2007
Faithless, Die Fantastischen Vier, Paul van Dyk, Miss Kittin, Moonbootica, DJ Rush, Dave Clarke, DJ Karotte, Tobi Neumann, Johannes Heil, Ricardo Villalobos, James Holden, New Young Pony Club, Northern Lite, 2raumwohnung & Band, The Chemical Brothers, Sven Väth, Polarkreis 18, Laurent Garnier, Ellen Allien, Der Dritte Raum, Frank Lorber

2008
Massive Attack, Moby, Fettes Brot, Sven Väth, Magda, Richie Hawtin, Troy Pierce, Heartthrob, Extrawelt, MIA., Deichkind, Digitalism, Simian Mobile Disco, Northern Lite, Zoot Woman, DJ Koze, Boys Noize, Alter Ego, Lexy & K-Paul, Moonbootica, Felix Kröcher, Dubfire, Tiefschwarz, Karotte, Wighnomy Brothers, Moguai, Tobias Lützenkirchen, Tobi Neumann

2009
Peter Fox, The Prodigy, Mr. Oizo, Deichkind, Laurent Garnier, MIA., Sven Väth, Northern Lite, Lexy & K-Paul, Turntablerocker, Polarkreis 18, Chapeau Claque, Fatboy Slim, Richie Hawtin, Carl Cox, Tiefschwarz, Felix Kröcher, Moguai, Dapayk & Padberg, Boris Dlugosch

2010
Die Fantastischen Vier, Underworld, Faithless, David Guetta, Richie Hawtin a.k.a. Plastikman, Sven Väth, Jan Delay & Disko No.1, Lexy & K-Paul, Miss Kittin, Kruder und Dorfmeister, Moguai, Ellen Allien, Tiefschwarz, Felix Kröcher, Dapayk & Eva Padberg, Boris Dlugosch, Boys Noize, Martin Anacker

2011
The Chemical Brothers, Swedish House Mafia, Moby, Clueso and Disco-Stress, Deichkind, Mr. Oizo, The Bloody Beetroots Death Crew 77, Laserkraft 3D, Carl Cox, DJ Koze, DJ Rush, Dominik Eulberg, Erol Alkan, Gregor Tresher, Moonbootica, Oliver Koletzki feat. Fran, The Disco Boys, Chris Liebing, Ellen Allien, Bonaparte

2012
The Prodigy, Fatboy Slim, Skrillex, Deichkind, Hot Chip, Steve Aoki, Loco Dice, Digitalism, Fritz Kalkbrenner, Lexy & K-Paul feat. Marteria, Marek Hemmann, Gesaffelstein, Frittenbude, Dubfire, The Koletzkis, Vitalic, Northern Lite, SebastiAn, Matthias Kaden, Chris Liebing, Apparat, Turntablerocker, Tiefschwarz

2013
Seeed, Boys Noize, The Bloody Beetroots, MIA., Sven Väth, Fritz Kalkbrenner, Lexy & K-Paul, Marek Hemmann, Oliver Koletzki, Mathias Kaden, Niconé, Sascha Braemer, Chase & Status, Nero, Knife Party, Moonbootica, Netsky, Feed Me, Joris Voorn, Seth Troxler, Miss Kittin, Pan-Pot

2014
Deadmau5, Fatboy Slim, Calvin Harris, Steve Aoki, The Bloody Beetroots, Marteria, Netsky, Solomun, Modestep, Klangkarussell

2015
Calvin Harris, The Chemical Brothers, Faithless, Steve Aoki, Deichkind, Boys Noize, Fritz Kalkbrenner, Netsky, Tale Of Us, Borgore, Robin Schulz, Marek Hemmann, Lexy & K-Paul, WhoMadeWho, Sigma, Alle Farben, Ostblockschlampen, Vitalic, Andhim, Andy C.

== See also ==
- List of electronic music festivals
