= Len Faki =

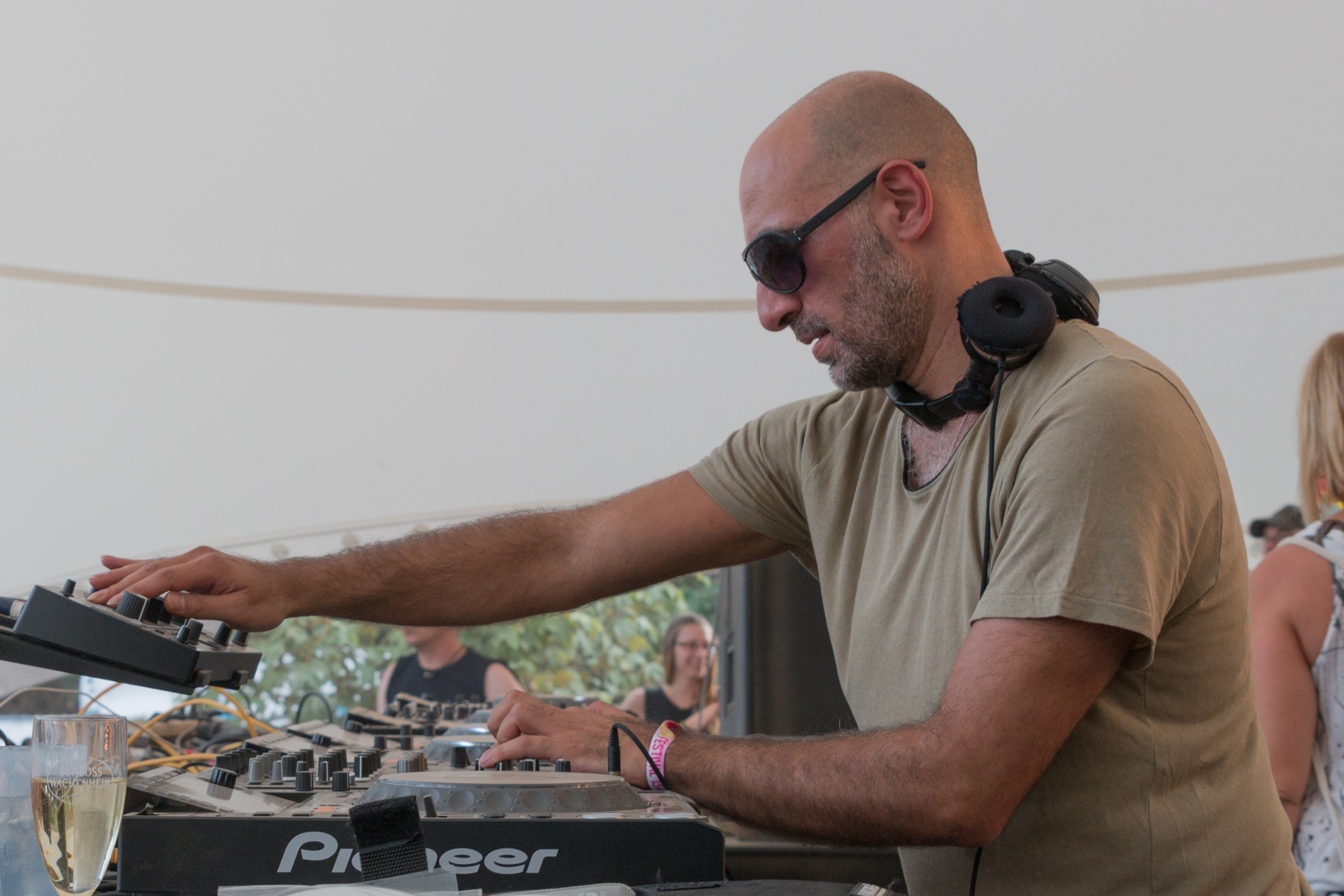
- Faki performing at the Sea You Festival in Freiburg im Breisgau in 2015.

Background information
- Also known as: Len Faki; La Monde
- Born: Levent Faki; Stuttgart, Baden-Württemberg, West Germany
- Genres: Techno; minimal techno
- Occupations: DJ; producer
- Years active: Mid 1990s–present
- Labels: Figure; Figure Jams; Ostgut Ton; Podium

Levent Faki, better known by his stage name Len Faki, is a German producer and DJ in the field of electronic dance music. Faki is of Turkish descent and is also known under the pseudonym La Monde.

== Career ==
Faki grew up in Kreis Esslingen in Southern Germany and began his career under the pseudonym DJ La Monde in the Stuttgart techno scene. His career began there in the mid-1990s with the Lexicon project on the house music label Plastic City.

In 1997, Faki founded the label Monoid in Stuttgart, as well as the label Feis in 1999. Productions by artists such as Uroš Umek, Samuel L. Session, John Selway, The Hacker and Bolz Bolz appeared on these labels. In 2001, he released his debut album Music for Some Place Other Than This. In 2002, Faki moved from Stuttgart to Berlin.

Faki founded the label Figure in 2003, and later a sub-label Figure Jams.

In 2006, Faki launched another label called Podium, which was intended to release EPs. In 2017, he released a remix of Radio Slave's song "Grindhouse".

He made a breakthrough in 2007, when he released the tracks "Mekong Delta" and "My Black Sheep".

Len Faki is a resident DJ at the Berlin club Berghain and regularly performs internationally as a DJ.

== Selected discography ==
- "Rainbow Delta" / "Mekong Delta" (12") (Ostgut Ton, 2007)
- Berghain 03 (Mix CD) (Ostgut Ton, 2009)
- Edit-Select / Len Faki – Berghain 03 | Part II (12") (Ostgut Ton, 2009)
- Basement Trax, Vol. 01 (12") (Ostgut Ton, 2013)
- LF & JH – VII (12") (Figure, 2013)
- LF & JH – VI (12") (Figure, 2013)
- Len Faki, Markus Suckut – Skulls Ep (12") (Figure, 2014)
