= Moonbootica =

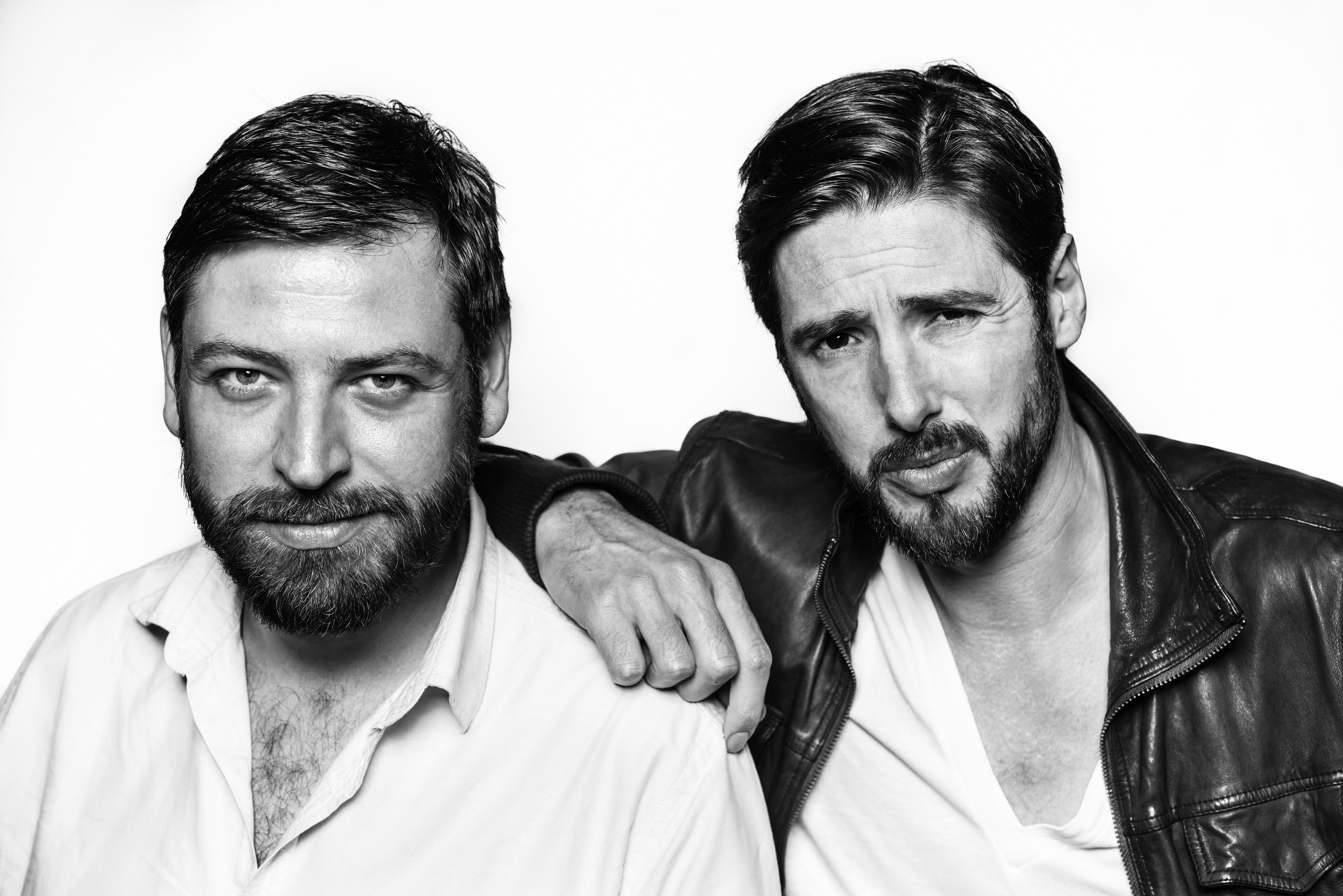
MOONBOOTICA (2013)

MOONBOOTICA is the pseudonym of Hamburg musicians and DJs KoweSix (Oliver Kowalski) and Tobitob (Tobias Schmidt), who have been performing together since the 1990s. They have released several albums and singles.

== Career ==
The MOONBOOTICA music project was born at the early Moonbootica party series in the clubs of Hamburg. Their style can be categorized as electronic music, drawing on electro and house genres, with certain hip-hop influences. The pair founded the Moonbootique label, releasing their own productions on the imprint.

Their eponymous debut album Moonbootica was released in 2005. It included the single "June" which was very well received in the electronic music scene. In 2007, the album Moonlight Welfare featured Der Mond - a collaboration with Hamburg compatriate Jan Delay. In 2011, Moonbootica released the track "Tonight" on the influential UK label Cheap Thrills. A third studio album was released in 2012; Our Disco Is Louder Than Yours was issued by Berlin label Four Music. Amongst the guests to feature here were Reggie Noble and Bon Homme from the Danish band WhoMadeWho. Shine, their fourth album, followed in June 2014, entering the top 50 of the German charts. Two singles from the album, "These Days Are Gone" and "Beats & Lines", were presented in a split video shot in Los Angeles and directed by Skinny. This is the second time that Moonbootica have worked together with the director duo hailing from France. Their previous collaborative effort, "ICONIC", was shown at the Cannes Film Festival.

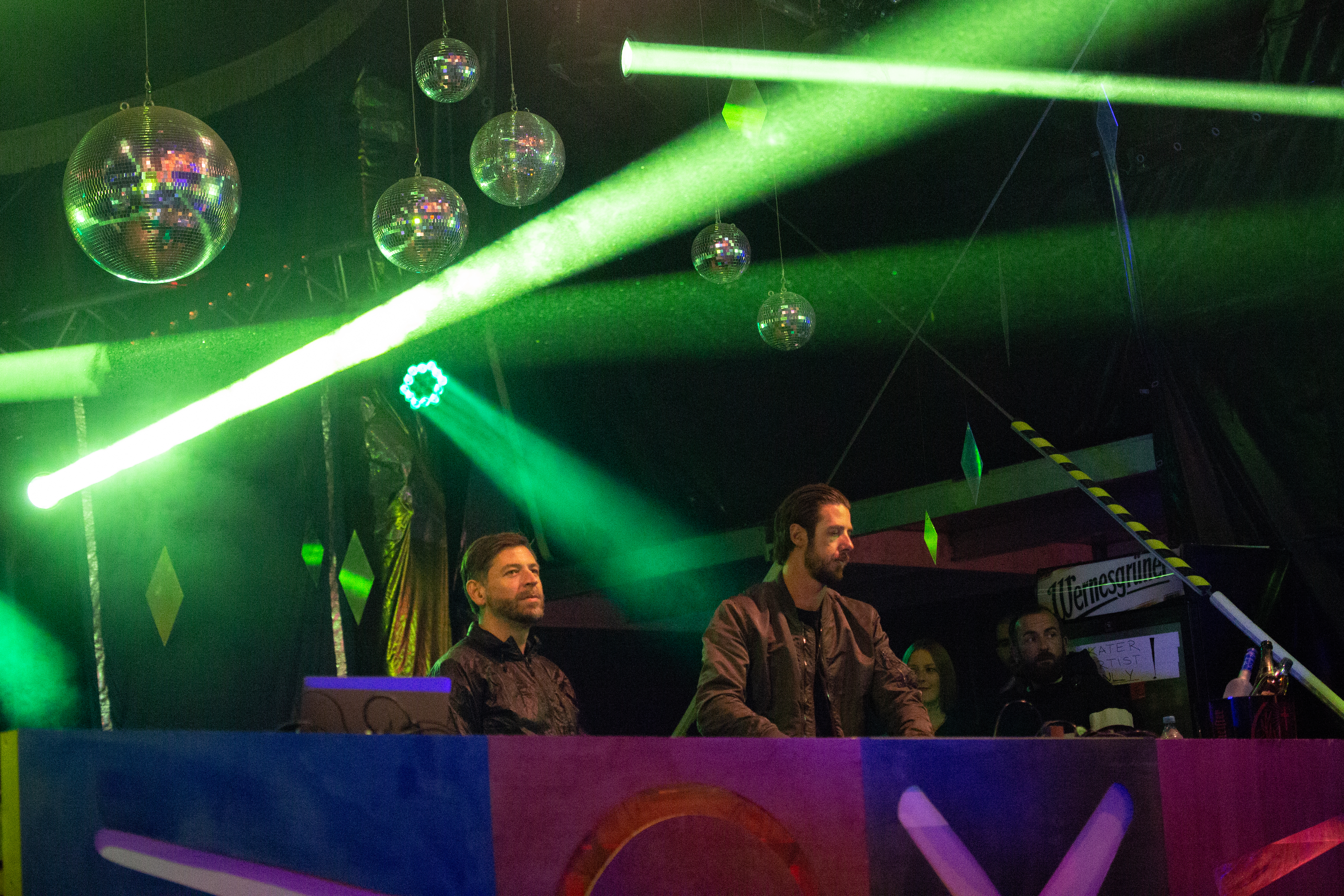
Moonbootica, SonneMondSterne 2018

Moonbootica have worked on remixes for a variety of artists including Robbie Williams, Skunk Anansie, Beatsteaks, Faithless, Jan Delay, Hurts and Kruder & Dorfmeister. Their own releases have also featured illustrious guests such as Anthony Mills, Thomas Hofding, Thomas Azier, Mohini Geisweiler, Siri Svegler and US rapper Reggie Noble. The duo have played DJ sets in clubs all over Europe on a regular basis (e.g. Watergate, Berlin / Razzmatazz, Barcelona / Krysha Mira, Moscow) and events in Australia and South America.

Moonbootica began playing an hour-long live show in 2013 which they have performed at renowned festivals like Rock am Ring/Rock im Park, Sputnik Springbreak and SonneMondSterne. For the live show, they created their very own lighting installation, weighing in at 1.5 tonnes. Guest vocalists and their own vocal performances extended the artistic spectrum far beyond the classic DJ show into a fully fledged live act. Since 2009, KoweSix has also worked with Kris Menace on the Black Van project, released by the New York label DFA.

== In popular culture ==
"I'm on Vacation" was featured in the Fox animated series Duncanville episode "Judge Annie".

== Discography ==
=== Albums ===
- Moonbootica (10/2005)
- Moonlight Welfare (10/2007)
- Our Disco Is Louder Than Yours (05/2012)
- Shine (06/2014)
- Future (04/2018)

=== Mix compilations ===
- DJ sounds good (03/2004)
- ... and then we started to dance (10/2006)
- Moonbootique Records Present Sound (2007)
- Save The Night (10/2009)

=== Singles ===
- Moonbootation (06/2001)
- Get it on (04/2002)
- Mau Mau high (01/2003)
- We 1,2 Rock / Roll the Dice (01/2004)
- Bulldog beats (07/2004)
- June / Mustang (02/2005)
- Listen (08/2005)
- Pretty little angel (12/2005)
- Mopedgang (04/2006)
- Wattbird / Break of light (10/2006)
- Jump Around (09/2007)
- Der Mond feat. Jan Delay (10/2007)
- Strobelight (05/2009)
- The Ease (11/2009)
- Men Of The Future (02/2010)
- Tonight (01/2011)
- I'm On Vacation Bitch feat. Redman (05/2012)
- Iconic (03/2012)
- Bounce With Me feat. Anthony Mills (11/2013)
- My Hot Dope / Partylife (02/2014)
- These Days Are Gone (05/2014)
- Beats & Lines (05/2014)
- Frustrated (2021)

=== Miscellaneous ===
- Dynamit Moonbootica RMX (2008) (Remix of Dynamite Deluxe's single 'Dynamit')
