= Mia Julia Brückner =

German pornographic actress (born 1986)

Mia Magma
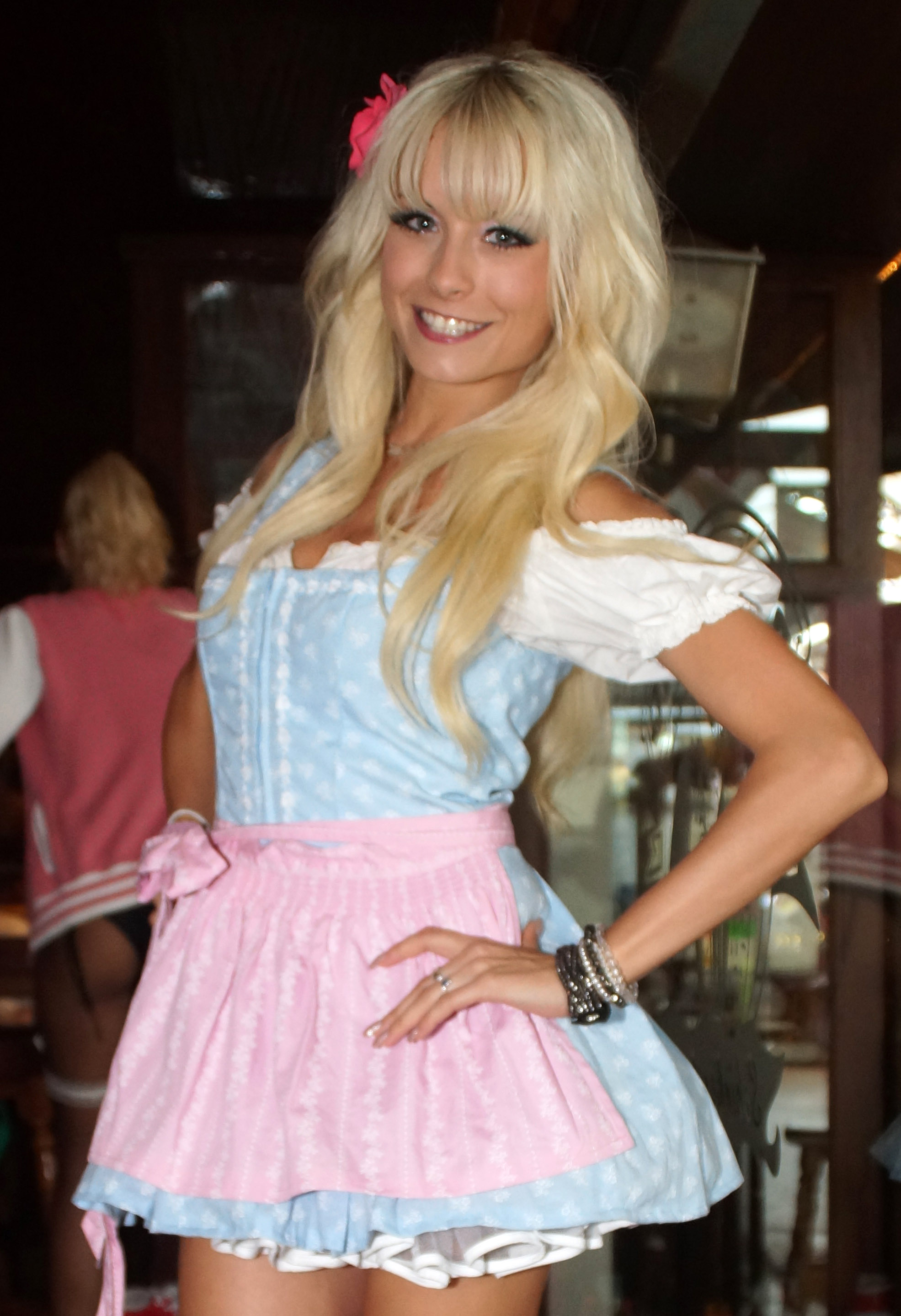
- Magma in 2013
- Born: Mia Julia Brückner; 9 December 1986 (age 39); Gilching, West Germany
- Other names: Fellucia; Mia Julia
- Occupations: Pornographic actress; singer
- Website: mia-julia.com

Mia Julia Brückner (born 9 December 1986), also known as Mia Magma, Mia Julia and Fellucia, is a German singer and pornographic actress.

== Early life ==
Mia Julia Brückner was born in Gilching, Bavaria, West Germany, on 9 December 1986.

== Career ==
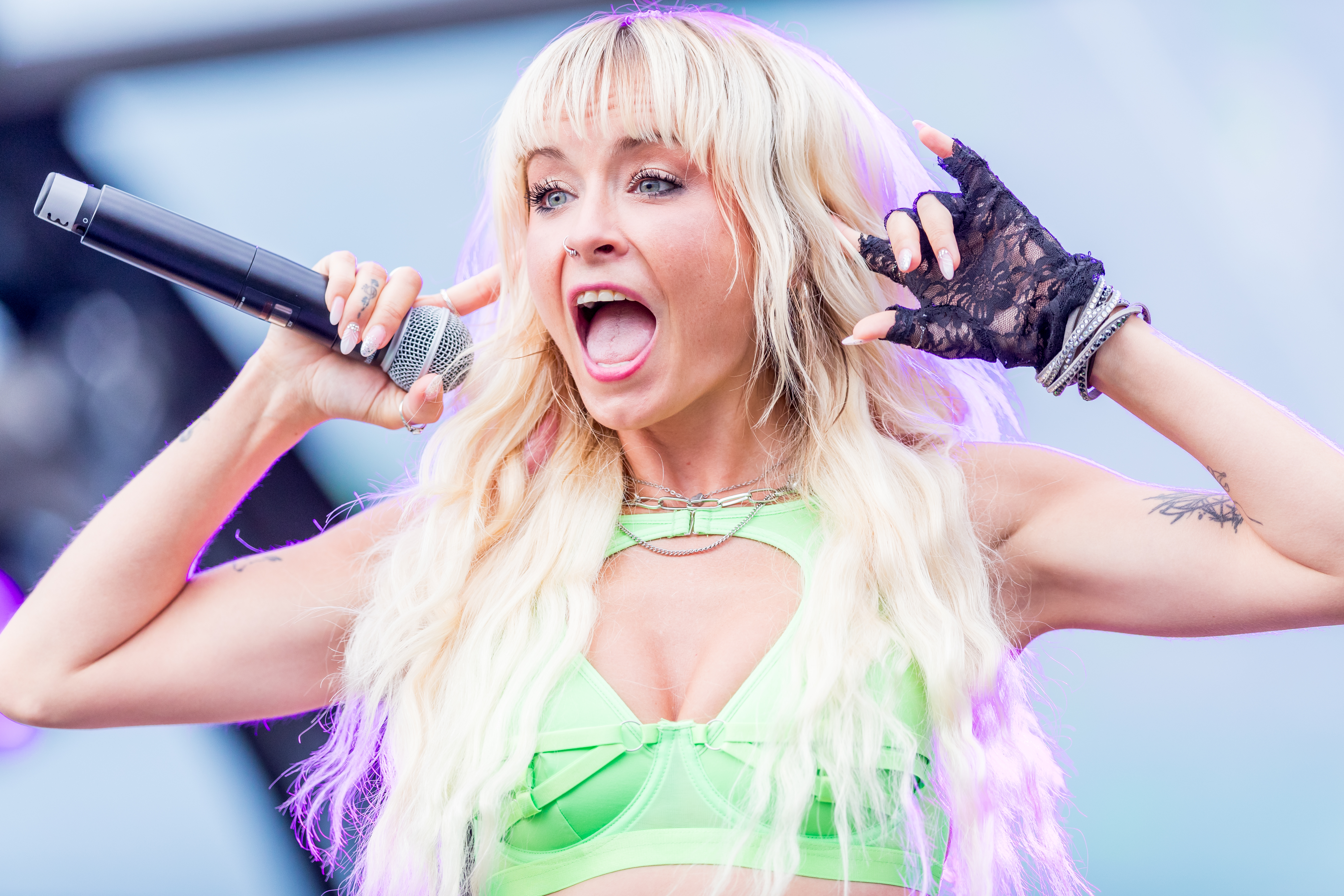
Magma performing in 2023

Magma debuted in the adult industry in December 2010, starring in the film Das Sennenlutschi. She had previously attended several swinger clubs together with her husband Peter, a former insurance agent, who later became her manager and an occasional actor in her films. Magma's life-size image appeared at the 2011 24 Hours Nürburgring on a BMW touring car sponsored by pornographic company Magmafilm, and she even attended the event as a special guest. In Summer 2012, she was also part of the 2012 touring music show Bierkönig.

In late 2011, Magma also appeared on the K.I.Z music video of the song "Fremdgehen", and featured a series of commercials for the airline Germanwings.

In September 2012, Magma announced her retirement from pornography to pursue a career in music and television with the new stage name Mia Miya. For this reason she even withdrew a Venus Award nomination. Magma returned to porn in 2020 via releasing content on OnlyFans and other online content.

Magma appeared on several magazine covers, including the May 2012 German issue of FHM and the October 2012 German issue of Penthouse.

In 2014, she was a contestant at Sat.1's Celebrity Big Brother Germany.

== Awards ==
- Eroticline Award (2010) – Best German Newcomer
- Erotic Lounge Award (2011) – Beste Darstellerin
