= Lexy & K-Paul =

German DJ duo

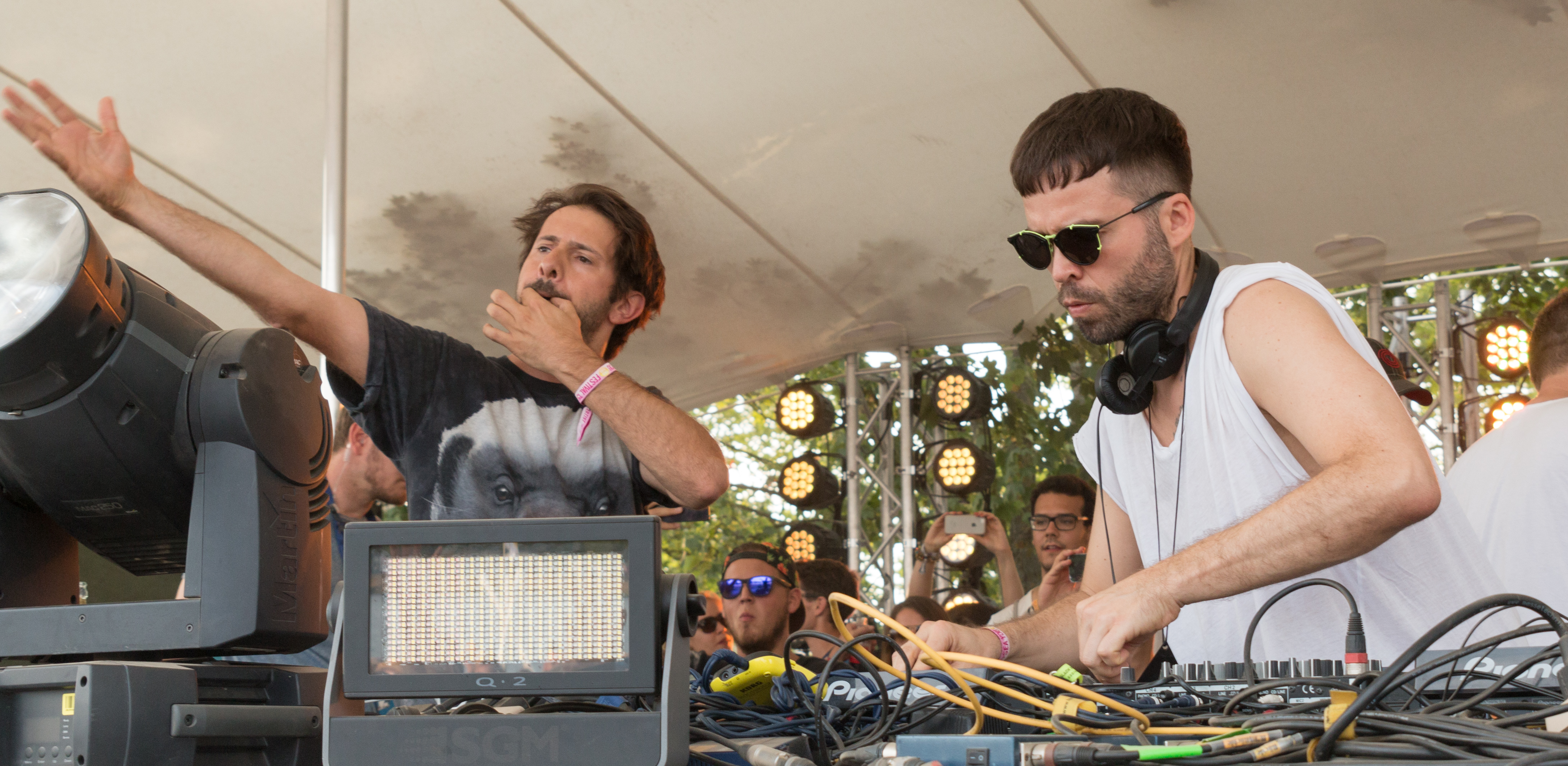
- Lexy & K-Paul 2015

Background information
- Also known as: Kill Bros.
- Origin: Berlin, Germany
- Genres: Trance, Techno, electro, house
- Years active: 1999–present
- Label: Low Spirit
- Members: Alexander Gerlach; Kai Michael Paul
- Website: www.lexykpaul.com

Lexy & K-Paul are DJs from Berlin consisting of Alexander Gerlach ("Lexy", born 14 January 1976 in Dresden) and Kai Michael Paul, formerly Kai Michael Fuchs ("K-Paul", born 5 November 1973 in Berlin). Lexy is also a member of the project Die Raketen, which also consists of Adel Dior and Jan-Eric Scholz. K-Paul formed duo Fuchs und Horn together with Horn.

Their music was released on Low Spirit Recordings, which is owned by WestBam, until 2007, when they formed their own label MusicIsMusic, distributed by Kontor Records.

== Additional information ==
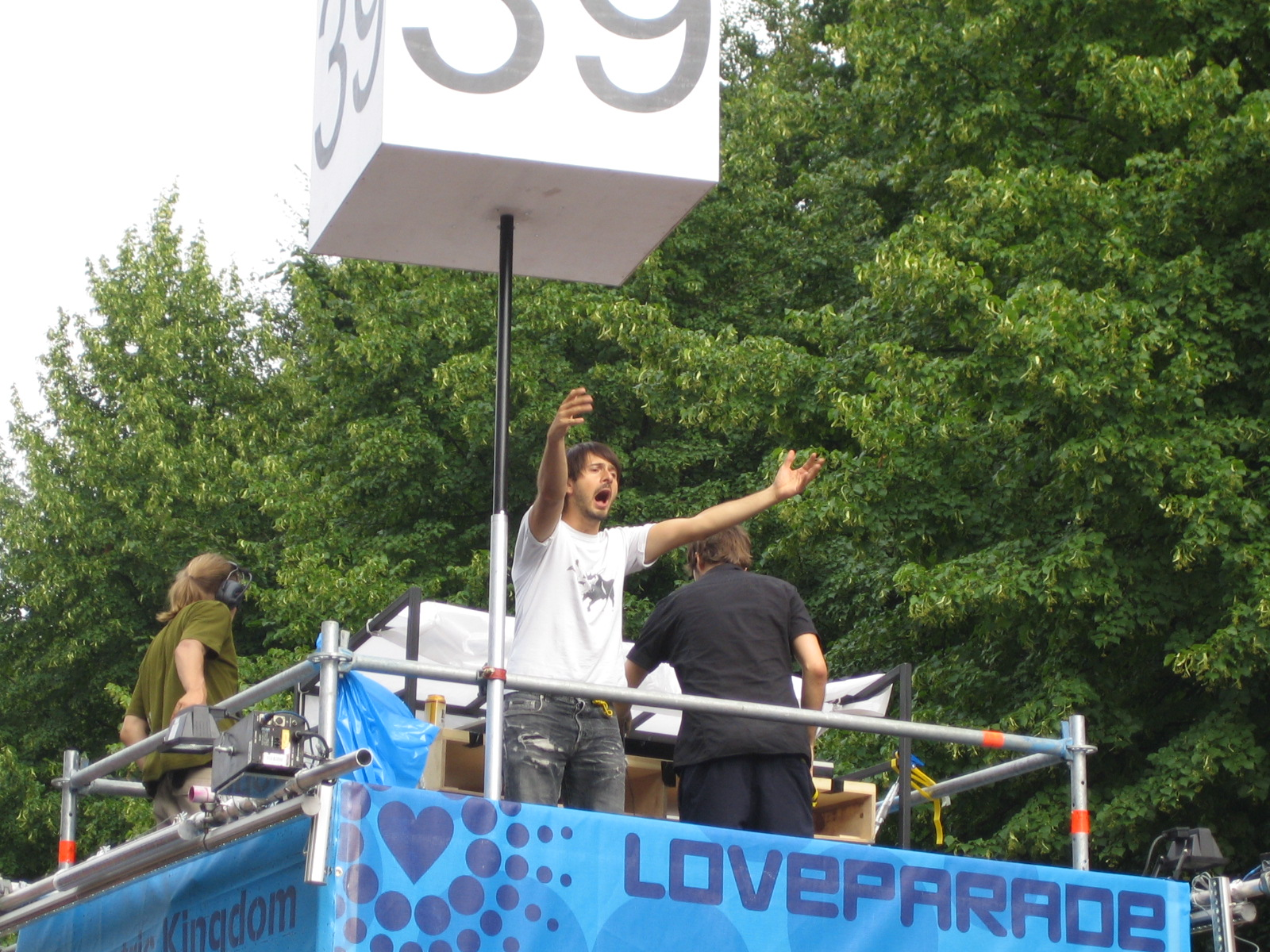
Lexy & K-Paul performing in Berlin in 2006

In 2001, Lexy, together with Mark Spoon, acted in the film Be.Angeled by Roman Kuhn. In 2005, The DVD was released showing the six-year-old band's history. It contains all their music videos with audio commentaries, a "making of" feature, and an exclusive interview.

== Discography ==
=== Albums ===
Title	Label	Release date
Loud	Low Spirit	16 October 2000
East End Boys	Low Spirit	5 May 2003
Trash Like Us	MusicIsMusic	25 May 2007
Abrakadabra	Kontor Records	2009
Psycho	Kontor Records	2011
Attacke	MusicIsMusic / Kontor Rec	12 April 2013

=== Singles ===
Title	Label	Release date
"The Greatest DJ"	Low Spirit	25 October 1999
"Electric Kingdom"	Low Spirit	27 March 2000
"Freak"	Low Spirit	14 August 2000
"You're the One"	Low Spirit	12 March 2001
"Let's Play" (featuring Atomek Dogg)	Low Spirit	18 March 2002
"Der Fernsehturm"	Low Spirit	19 August 2002
"Girls Get It First"	Low Spirit	3 April 2003
"Dancing"	Low Spirit	13 October 2003
"Love Me Babe"	Low Spirit	15 March 2004
"Vicious Love"	Low Spirit	29 November 2004
"Happy Zombies"	Low Spirit	13 June 2005
"Wide Road"	MusicIsMusic	11 May 2007
"Pony Boy"	MusicIsMusic	30 October 2007
"The Clap" (featuring Das Bo)	MusicIsMusic	February 2008
"Your Name" (featuring Chefket)	MusicIsMusic	2013
"L.O.V.E."	MusicIsMusic	2013
"Killing Me" (featuring Yasha)	MusicIsMusic	2014
"Gassenhauer"	MusicIsMusic	2015

=== DVDs ===
- 2005: Lexy & K-Paul – The DVD

=== Awards ===
- 2001 – ECHO „Best National Newcomer Dance Act 2001“
