= Parookaville =

German electronic music festival

Coordinates: 51.6059°N 6.1212°E

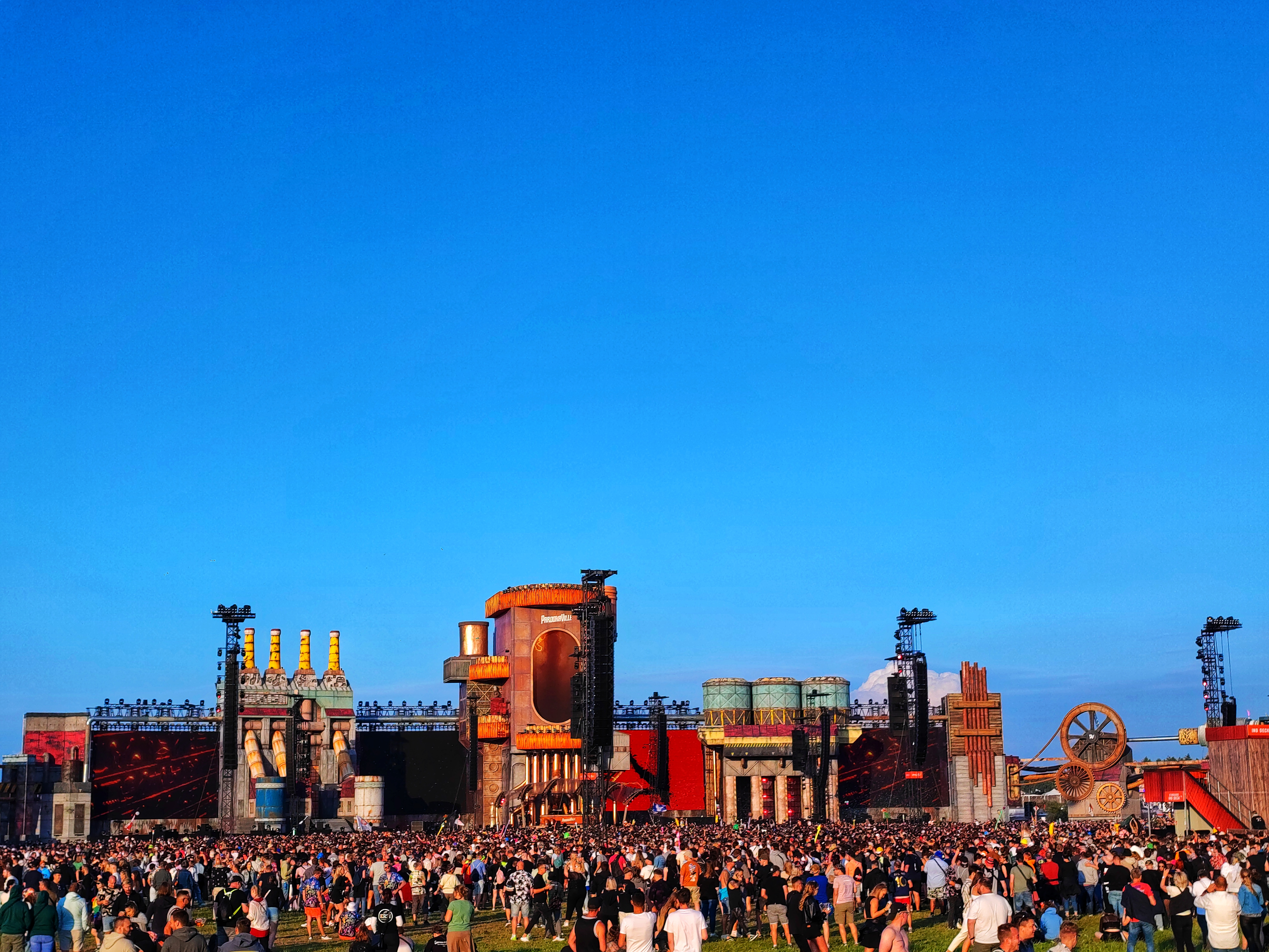
- Parookaville mainstage 2023
- Genre: EDM
- Frequency: annually
- Locations: Weeze Airport, Weeze, Germany
- Years active: 11 years
- Inaugurated: July 17, 2015
- Most recent: July 18-20, 2025
- Next event: July 17-19, 2026
- Attendance: 225,000 (2023, 3 days total)
- Capacity: 85,000 (all stages combined)
- Organizer: Next Events GmbH
- Website: parookaville.com

Parookaville (PV) is a German three-day music festival in the field of electronic dance music, which has been taking place annually since 2015 in Weeze Airport. Parookaville is known for its elaborately designed show concept, in which the festival is staged as a separate city.

== Line-up ==
Date	Total attendance	Line-Up (Excerpt)
17–18 July 2015	50,000	Alesso, Armin van Buuren, Dimitri Vegas & Like Mike, Steve Aoki, Martin Solveig, Fedde le Grand, DVBBS, Oliver Heldens, Tujamo, Danny Ávila, The Chainsmokers, Moguai, Deorro, Ostblockschlampen, Robin Schulz
15 - 17 July 2016	100,000	Steve Aoki, Tiësto, Afrojack, Axwell Λ Ingrosso, Martin Solveig, Tujamo, DVBBS, Headhunterz, Felix Jaehn, Lost Frequencies, Gestört aber GeiL, Yellow Claw, Tube & Berger, Moguai, Henri PFR, Watermät
21 - 23 July 2017	160,000	David Guetta, Armin van Buuren, Headhunterz, Axwell Λ Ingrosso, Oliver Heldens, Don Diablo, KSHMR, Laidback Luke, Sam Feldt, Yellow Claw, Galantis, Robin Schulz, DJ Snake, Marshmello, Alle Farben, Paul Kalkbrenner
19 - 21 July 2018	160,000	David Guetta, Armin van Buuren, Hardwell, Martin Garrix, Robin Schulz, Steve Aoki, Zedd, Axwell Λ Ingrosso, Solomun, Sven Väth, Vini Vici, Benny Benassi, Da Tweekaz, Headhunterz, Brennan Heart, Galantis, Jonas Blue, Yellow Claw, Fedde le Grand, Timmy Trumpet, KSHMR, Alle Farben, Laidback Luke, Sofi Tukker, MaRLo
19-21 July 2019	170,000	Above & Beyond - Alan Walker - Afrojack - Armin van Buuren - Carnage - Dimitri Vegas & Like Mike - GRAVEDGR - Lost Frequencies - Richie Hawtin - Steve Aoki - The Chainsmokers - W&W - Fisher - Jauz - Jonas Blue - Lucas & Steve - Marika Rossa - Moksi - Mr. Belt & Wezol - Neelix - Nghtmre - Ofenbach - Oliver Magenta - Ran-D - Salvatore Ganacci - Sam Feldt (live) - Sefa - Showtek - Slander - Warface - Yellow Claw - Zomboy - KSHMR - Hugel

== See also ==
- List of electronic music festivals
- Live electronic music
