= Wax Trax! MasterMix Volume 1 =

Compilation album by Juan Atkins
- Released: 1998
- Genre: Techno, Detroit techno
- Label: Wax Trax!

Juan Atkins chronology
Skynet (1998)	Wax Trax! MasterMix Volume 1 (1998)	Mind and Body (1999)

Wax Trax! MasterMix Volume 1 is a compilation album mixed by the American musician Juan Atkins, released in 1998. It was the first in a series of DJ mixes released by Wax Trax! Records. Atkins supported the album by participating in the MasterMix tour.

== Production ==
The album was mixed live by Atkins, who contributed four of his own tracks: "No UFOs", "Game One", "Skyway", and "Starlight". "Sharevari", by the musicians A Number of Names, is sometimes considered to be the first techno song. "Sex on the Beach", by DJ Assault, is an early example of ghettotech, a style of music that also originated in Detroit. "Nude Photo" is the first record released by Atkins's fellow Detroit musician Derrick May.

== Critical reception ==
Professional ratings
Review scores
Source	Rating
AllMusic	4/5 stars
Robert Christgau	(dud)
Entertainment Weekly	A−
(The New) Rolling Stone Album Guide	4/5 stars
Spin	7/10
The Virgin Encyclopedia of Popular Music	4/5 stars

The Chicago Tribune noted that "the album's intent seems to be much less high-minded, serving simply as a solid representation of Atkins' propulsive live sets, which touch on techno classics, foreign manifestations and prime second- wave Motor City cuts". The Detroit Free Press stated, "Even with the mix of old and new material from Atkins and other artists, Atkins glides through the 19 tracks so effortlessly, it makes it difficult to have a complete grasp on the end of one song and the beginning of another. Techno-heads will probably hail MasterMix as a DJ's masterpiece, but newcomers may find it monotonous."

Rolling Stone said that the compilation "works as a pocket history of Motor City microchip music, explicitly admitting techno's evolution from Seventies European disco." The Orange County Register listed the compilation among the best examples of Detroit techno. The Washington Post concluded that many tracks "showcase Detroit techno's accomplishment: endowing Kraftwerk's mechanical beats with the suppleness of a live funk band." Entertainment Weekly called the album "a beautiful, warts-and-all set of genre classics." LA Weekly listed Wax Trax! MasterMix Volume 1 as the ninth best "pop" album of 1998.

In 2011, Spin included Wax Trax! MasterMix Volume 1 on its list of "essential" Detroit techno albums. AllMusic concluded that "the mixing is much more raw than on a live Atkins date, perhaps a reaction to the dozens of seamless (read: overdubbed) mix albums already on the market."

== Track listing ==
No.	Title	Artist	Length
1.	"No UFOs"	Model 500
2.	"Nude Photo"	Rhythim Is Rhythim
3.	"Sharevari"	A Number of Names
4.	"Disco Circus"	Martin Circus
5.	"Lara's Theme"	B.J. Robson
6.	"Another Dae"	Blaze
7.	"Prime Time"	Rick Wade
8.	"Reborn"	Walt J
9.	"The Pace"	Rob Hood
10.	"Convextion (AA)"	Convextion
11.	"Nature of the Beast"	Black Noise
12.	"Their Voices"	Pacou
13.	"Game One"	Infiniti
14.	"Skyway"	Infiniti
15.	"Sex on the Beach"	DJ Assault
16.	"Inhibitions (Clear Horizons Mix)"	Belizbeha
17.	"7"	Maurizio
18.	"Starlight"	Model 500
19.	"Klum"	Mr. Oizo
