= Techno! The New Dance Sound of Detroit =

1988 compilation album

Compilation album by various artists
- Recorded: 1988
- Genre: Detroit techno
- Length: 73:54
- Label: Virgin, 10 Records

Techno! The New Dance Sound of Detroit is a 1988 compilation of early Detroit techno tracks released on the Virgin Records UK imprint 10 Records. The compilation's title helped establish the term "techno" as the name for electronic dance music emerging out of Detroit in the 1980s.

== Background ==
Compiled by techno producer Derrick May and Kool Kat Records boss Neil Rushton (at the time an A&R scout for Virgin's "10 Records" UK imprint), the album was an important milestone and marked, in the UK, the introduction of the word techno in reference to a specific genre of music. Previously, the style was characterized as Detroit's interpretation of Chicago house rather than a genre unto itself.

The compilation's working title had been The House Sound of Detroit until the addition of Juan Atkins' song "Techno Music" prompted reconsideration. Atkins's "Techno Music" contains speech synthesis, and its title was inspired by Alvin Toffler's book The Third Wave. Rushton was later quoted as saying he, Atkins, May, and Saunderson came up with the compilation's final name together, and that the Belleville Three voted down calling the music some kind of regional brand of house; they instead favored a term they were already using, techno.

== Release and legacy ==
Commercially, the release did not fare as well as expected, and it failed to recoup, however Inner City's production "Big Fun" (1988), a track that was almost not included on the compilation, became a massive crossover hit in fall 1988. The record was also responsible for bringing industry attention to May, Atkins and Saunderson, which led to discussions with ZTT records about forming a techno supergroup called Intellex. But, when the group were on the verge of finalising their contract, May allegedly refused to agree to Top of the Pops appearances and negotiations collapsed. According to May, ZTT label boss Trevor Horn had envisaged that the trio would be marketed as a "black Pet Shop Boys."

RBMA called the compilation "genre-defining." The compilation was the first introduction to techno for many European listeners, particularly in England, Belgium, and Germany. European musicians would subsequently be inspired to develop their own takes on the style.

== Track listing ==
1. Rythim Is Rythim - "It Is What It Is" (6:45)
2. Blake Baxter - "Forever and a Day" (5:39)
3. Eddie "Flashin'" Fowlkes - "Time to Express" (5:44)
4. K.S. Experience - "Electronic Dance" (6:40)
5. Members of the House - "Share This House (Radio Mix)" (4:26)
6. A Tongue & D Groove - "Feel Surreal" (6:58)
7. Mia Hesterley - "Spark" (6:12)
8. Juan - "Techno Music" (5:45)
9. Inner City - "Big Fun" (7:42)
10. Blake Baxter - "Ride Em Boy" (6:28)
11. Shakir - "Sequence 10" (5:22)
12. Idol Making - "Un, Deux, Trois" (6:06)

== Credits ==
- Compiled By – Neil Rushton
- Coordinator [Detroit Co-ordinator] – Mayday
- Design – Effigy
- Photography by – Lawrence Watson
- Sleeve Notes – Stuart Cosgrove

== Bibliography ==
- Sicko, D., Techno Rebels: The Renegades of Electronic Funk, Billboard Books, 1999 (ISBN 978-0823084289).
- Sicko, D., Techno Rebels: The Renegades of Electronic Funk, 2nd ed., Wayne State University Press, 2010 (ISBN 978-0814334386).
