= No UFO's =

Single by Model 500
- B-side: "Future"
- Released: April 1985
- Studio: Metroplex Soundworks
- Genre: Techno
- Label: Metroplex
- Composer: M500
- Producer: M500

Model 500 singles chronology
"No UFO's" (1985)	"Night Drive" (1985)

"No UFO's" is a techno song by American record producer and DJ Juan Atkins under the alias of Model 500, released in April 1985 on Atkins own label Metroplex. The song was the first track released after the split of Atkins' previous group Cybotron. The music followed similar themes of the previous group with science fiction and alienation but featured less of a song structure than Cybotron's music leading the track to be often identified as one of the earliest techno songs.

On its release, the track was sold in Chicago where it grew to the popularity that was larger than that in Detroit. When music labels from England investigated the dance music in Chicago, they eventually mapped it back to Detroit leading to Atkins and his related musicians to agreeing to release a compilation bearing the song "Techno Music" by Atkins on Techno! The New Dance Sound of Detroit. The song was re-released in 2017 with remixes from contemporary artists such as Moodymann.

== Production ==
=== Background ===
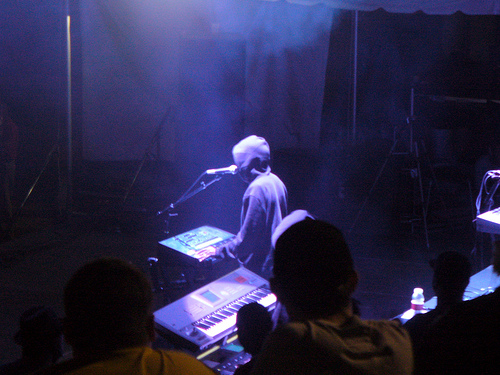
Atkins performing as Model 500 at DEMF in 2007.

Prior to recording "No UFO's", Juan Atkins grew up in a musical family with his father being a music promoter. Atkins first began playing music with friends on his street initially playing bass and guitar until he became 14 or 15 years old, and his family moved to Belleville, Michigan near Atkins' grandmother. When moving to Belleville, Atkins started playing the keyboard and convinced his grandmother to buy him a synthesizer. Atkins became entranced with the sound of the machine and making electronic music demos by the time he was starting his college education. Atkins was influenced by radio host The Electrifying Mojo, that aired between 1977 and 1985 and played a wide variety of music ranging from funk artists like Parliament, Prince and James Brown as well as Kraftwerk, Peter Frampton and New wave music.

In College, Atkins met Rik Davis who was ten years older than Atkins. Atkins later described Davis as being "like a father figure to me. He taught me a lot. We didn’t have so much in common. I was in awe of him. My father was in jail at the time." The two formed a group Cybotron in 1981. Their singles released were "Alley of Your Mind" in 1981 which was played by The Electrifying Mojo regularly, and followed it up with "Cosmic Cars" in 1982. The group then signed to the California-based Fantasy Records and released the album Enter and the single "Clear" which became a hit on Billboard's Black Singles chart spending nine weeks there. The group broke up shortly after with Davis wanting to pursue a more rock-based approach to music, leading Atkins to develop his own solo project as Model 500.

=== Development ===
As Model 500, Atkins created his own music label called Metroplex to release what he described as "more funk and bass-heavy electro tracks." The tracks for the first Model 500 release were done in the basement of Atkins mother's home on the East side of Detroit. As Atkins was taking an audio engineering course at The Recording Institute of Detroit, he would return home to apply the skills he learned on his own recordings. They were recorded with an 8-track tape recorder and a 16 channel mixing board and using a Roland TR-909 for the drum track sequence, and a Korg MS-10 for the synths. Atkins recollected that it took about two days to finish the track "Future".

Atkins felt strongly in his style of music and said that "setting up Metroplex was the only way to get it out there." Atkins had previously attempted to send "No UFO's" to other music labels who turned it down.

== Style ==
"No UFO's (Vocal)"
"No UFO's" has no verse/chorus structure, with lyrics that chanted rather than sung that are first heard nearly two minutes within the song.

Mark Jonathan Butler, in his book on the history of electronic dance music, stated that "No UFO's" was "frequently described as the first techno record." stating that unlike similar earlier tracks like Cybotron's "Alleys of Your Mind" and "Sharevari", the song had "no obvious relationship to rock or pop music. The instrumentation is entirely electronic with Butler describing it having stark drum machine rhythms as its prominent feature.

The song has no verse/chorus structure, with lyrics that chanted rather than sung that are first heard nearly two minutes within the song. Atkins spoke about the lyrics in the song as "The government always tries to cover up the fact that there could be other life in the galaxy. To me, the system is bent on keeping people in despair, hopeless, not wanting to achieve anything, so if you keep your head up high maybe you'll start realizing things that you never thought possible and seeing a UFO is probably the ultimate possibly." Like in Cybotron, Atkins and Davis were both interested in technology and the future and spent significant time discussing them philosophically and read works such as Alvin Toffler's 1980 book The Third Wave. These themes were also reflected in Cybotron's previous singles such as "Cosmic Cars" and "Industrial Lies".

== Release ==
"No UFO's" was released in April 1985 on Metroplex. "‘No UFO’s’ was popular in Detroit, with Atkins noting that it was released to the radio when Jeff Mills was hosting, and "as soon as [Mills] got his hands on it, he put it in heavy rotation in his mixes, and it became an instant smash hit in his radio show. Also, this was the time of house music in Chicago, so DJs like Farley "Jackmaster" Funk, Bad Boy Bill, Ralphi Rosario, Julian Jumpin Perez, and Fast Eddie, among others, [played it]; therefore the record also became a smash hit in Chicago." Carl Craig reflected on hearing "No UFO's" for the first time at 5pm on the radio on a weekday, noting that "It was drive time, so it really gave me the opportunity to hear this music as being more than just club music."

According to Atkins, the song was more popular in Chicago than Detroit. The song reached Chicago by when Atkins' associates Derrick May and Blake Baxter drove Baxter's pickup truck full of records to sell in Chicago, and then these records were exported to the United Kingdom. This led to record companies in England travelling to the United States to research the music, initially starting in Chicago where they were told the music was coming from Detroit. Arriving in Detroit, Neil Rushton suggested to do a compilation album for Virgin Records and call it The House Sound of Detroit which was later renamed to Techno! The New Dance Sound of Detroit based on the Model 500 song that was included on the compilation called "Techno Music".

The song was re-released by Metroplex in 2017 with remixes from Moodymann and Luciano. Atkins stated that idea behind these remixes was "why reinvent the wheel when we can get the source material that created the wheel in first place and reworked?" and that he "wanted to incorporate collaborations with some major players nowadays, like Moodymann and Luciano. That will make it possible to reach a newer, wider, and more diverse audience."

== Reception ==
In a 1992 article on Atkins, Kris Needs wrote in the NME that Atkins tracks "Ocean to Ocean" and "No UFO's" as "timeless classics." Stuart Maconie also discussed "No UFO's" along with "Big Fun", "When We Used to Play", "Nude Photo" and "Goodbye Kiss" as the recordings that "embodied the new sound of Detroit, a sound synonymous with the new labels Transmat and Metroplex." In 2022, Rolling Stone ranked "No UFO’s" number 94 in their list of the "200 Greatest Dance Songs of All Time".

== Track listing ==
- 12" single (M-001)
1. "No UFO's (Vocal)" – 4:17
2. "No UFO's (Instrumental)" – 6:55
3. "Future (Vocal)" – 4:45
4. "Future (Instrumental)" – 5:01

== Credits ==
Credits are adapted from the vinyl release sticker of "No UFO's".

- Marcellus 'Pete' Atkins – executive producer
- Juan Atkins – engineer, composer, producer
