= Stacey Pullen =

American techno musician

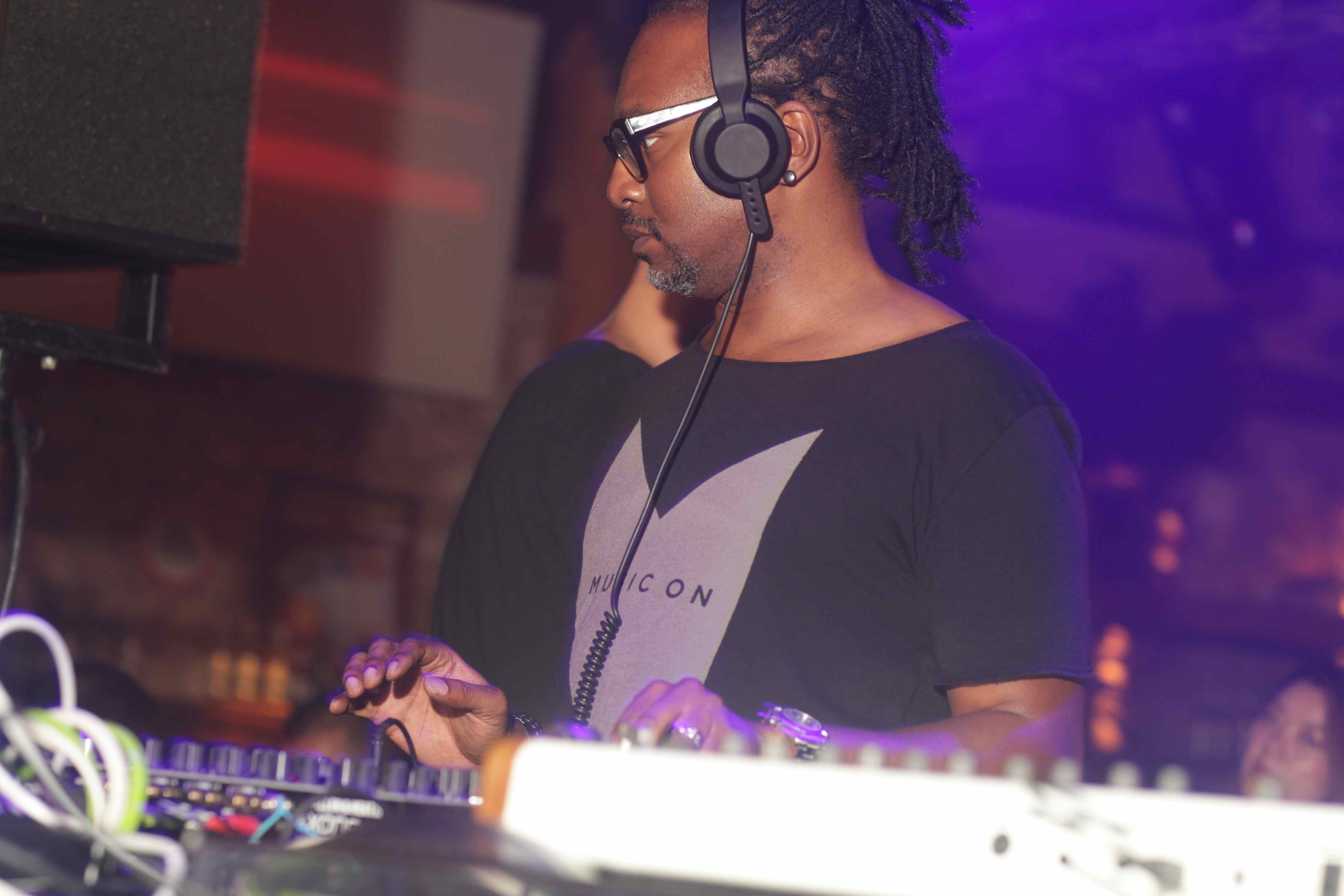
Stacey Pullen performing at Amnesia, 2012

Stacey Pullen is an American techno musician based in Detroit, Michigan, United States.

Pullen was raised in Detroit, where he became interested in electronic music early in his life. He began working on the Detroit techno scene in 1990, studying with Derrick May and working with him on business ventures. He used the aliases Bango, Kosmik Messenger, X-Stacy and Silent Phase. Pullen's incorporation of house and garage with techno has been cited as an influence on later electronic artists.

== Musical style ==
Pullen's music direction was strongly inspired by Derrick May, Juan Atkins and Kevin Saunderson, collectively referred to as the Belleville Three. Derrick May directly mentored Pullen, helping refine his sound, production skills and overall work ethic. Other peers included the next generation of Detroit producers, including Carl Craig and Jeff Mills, though musically Pullen sought a medium between Craig's futurism and Mills' raw minimalism.

Pullen also obtained recording deals with labels such as R&S and Plink Plonk, run by former Shamen frontman Mr C.

His album Today Is the Tomorrow You Were Promised Yesterday, released on Virgin imprint Science, meanwhile, departed from the Detroit sound in favour of jazz/funk grooves, prompting comparisons to the work of Herbie Hancock.

== Discography ==
- DJ-Kicks: Stacey Pullen (Studio !K7, 1996)
- Today Is the Tomorrow You Were Promised Yesterday (EMI, 2001)
- Fabric 14 (Fabric Mix Albums, 2004)
- Balance 028: Stacey Pullen (Balance, 2015)
