= Steven Tang =

Steven Tang, also known as Obsolete Music Technology, is a house music DJ and producer.

== Early life and education ==
Tang was born in Hong Kong. In the early 1980s he moved to United States with his family. While growing up in a suburb of Chicago, he attended warehouse parties and listened to underground house music and mix tapes from Juan Atkins, Derrick May, Kevin Saunderson and local radio station shows played on WBMX.

In the 1990s Tang studied Radio Broadcasting at Columbia College Chicago.

== Career ==
Tang dj-ed at local events and clubs during and after his education. In 1998 he established Emphasis Recordings with his debut release, "Windy City EP". Tang's first full-length album, Disconnect to Connect, was released in 2013. By 2014 he had released five albums and EPs through Emphasis, as well as four on other labels, including Smallville Records. That year he was interviewed in 5Chicago magazine about the art of DJing.

In 2016, Tang continues to perform as a DJ. That year his music was included on Keith Worthy's EP Abstract Frequencies.

== Discography ==
=== Albums and EPs ===
- "Windy City " – (Emphasis Recordings, 1998)
- "Nightfall" – (Emphasis Recordings, 2002)
- "Machine Oriented" – (Emphasis Recordings, 2006)
- "Ominous" – (Emphasis Recordings, 2007)
- "The Verged Sessions" – (Aesthetic Audio, 2010)
- "Bass Synergy" – (Emphasis Recordings, 2011)
- "Uprise In The Orient" – (Syncrophone Recordings, 2011)
- "Disconnect To Connect " – (Smallville Records, 2013).
- "Leaving The Physical World" – (Smallville Records, 2014)

=== Remixes ===
- Osunlade - "Sunspot" 2014
- Duplex – "First Day" (2013)
- Lawrence – "Angels At Night" (2013)
