= Anthony Shakir =

American techno musician

Anthony "Shake" Shakir, who also uses the aliases Sequence 10 and Da Sampla, is an American techno producer, best known for his contributions to Detroit techno and helped shape the techno's early sounds with artist Derrick May and Carl Craig. He is an influential yet underrecognized figure in techno, and known for his style in blending/experimenting elements of electro, hip-hop, and funk.

Shakir began producing in 1981, and worked with Detroit musicians for many of the early Metroplex releases. Shakir appeared under the name Sequence 10 on the Virgin Records compilation Techno: The New Dance Sound of Detroit.

While many of his peers on the Detroit scene have worked to increase their profile in Europe, Shakir never gravitated toward this scene, working more closely with the second wave of Detroit techno musicians such as Mike Banks and Claude Young. He formed the labels Frictional in 1995 and Puzzlebox in 1996, the latter with Keith Tucker.

== Style ==
Shakir had a different style than most artists in techno during the early stages, going more experimental. In a DIY Magazine interview, Shake was quoted saying “every record I owned was an instrument,” talking about how he used sampling as his primary tool, most likely why he earned the nickname Da Sampla. Shakir would also use equipment such as the EMU SP-12 Sampler, that he had borrowed from Kevin Saunderson and the limited resources he had he says it actually shaped his sound. One of Shake’s boldest moves was going independent to chase the experimental sounds, which was something that he took pride in.

== Health struggles ==
Diagnosed with Multiple Sclerosis (MS) in the year 2000. it has derailed his career a bit. In March of 2026, there was a benefit held on behalf of him. Containing many different DJ’s who were influenced by Shakir to help bring awareness to Shakes health issues, and celebrate him while he’s here rather than when he passes. He has had long-term treatment for his disease.

== Credits ==
Among Shakir's credits are remixes for Telex and Inner City, as well as co-production of the Urban Tribe's 1998 album for Mo Wax, The Collapse of Modern Culture. The likes of DJ Stingray and Eddie Fowlkes credit him to his distinctive sound.
