= Orlando Voorn =

Dutch DJ and electronic music producer (born 1968)

- Birth name: Orlando Voorn
- Also known as: Basic Bastard; Fix; Format; Frequency; The Nighttripper
- Born: 25 April 1968 (age 57)
- Origin: Amsterdam, Netherlands
- Genres: Techno, house
- Years active: 1986–present
- Labels: Ignitor; International Deejay Gigolo Records; KMS; Rush Hour; Night Vision; Nicepeople; Triangle Records

Orlando Voorn (born 25 April 1968, in Amsterdam) is a Dutch DJ and electronic music producer.

== Biography ==
As a solo artist he has released work since the early 80s under a large amount of aliases containing Balance, Frequency, Baruka, Basic Bastard, Fix, Dope Dog, Boy, Stalker and The Nighttripper. He also produced tracks with Blake Baxter under the name Ghetto Brothers and with Jeff Porter as Designer Loops.

Voorn won the Dutch DMC DJ Championships in 1986 which meant the beginning of a large number of released tracks. As a professional DJ he released his first club tracks under the record label Lower East Side Records. Together with Detroit techno music pioneers Juan Atkins, Derrick May and Blake Baxter he produced tracks under various labels. Voorn's music is characterized by its variety of styles such as Techno, Drum n bass, Ambient, Hip hop and Electro. By many people Orlando Voorn is considered the first one to establish a connection (in music) between Detroit and Amsterdam.
