= Classics (Model 500 album) =

Compilation album by Model 500
- Released: 1993
- Genre: Detroit techno
- Label: R&S
- Producer: Juan Atkins/Model 500

Model 500 chronology
Classics (1993)	Sonic Sunset (1995)

Classics is a compilation album by Juan Atkins under the alias of Model 500. It was released in 1993 by R&S Records.

== Production and music ==
The album's tracks were initially released between 1985 and 1990. Select noted that tracks "No UFO's" and "Off to Battle" have been "polished in the studio". Juan Atkins has stated that George Clinton's bands Parliament and Funkadelic were important to his musical awakening. He grew up listening to The Electrifying Mojo's radio shows. He also acknowledged Kraftwerk as one of the influences on his music.

== Release ==
Classics was released in 1993 through R&S Records.

== Reception ==
Professional ratings
Review scores
Source	Rating
AllMusic	5/5 stars
Select	(4/5)
The New Rolling Stone Album Guide	4/5 stars

In a contemporary review, Select gave the album a four out of five rating, calling it "a fairly comprehensive collection of the work of Juan Atkins" The review noted on the album's release that Atkins "has lately become something of a forgotten hero," and that this release should "encourage him to get involved with the present again."

AllMusic gave the album a five out of five star rating, praising tracks such as "No UFOs", "Sound of Stereo", "Night Drive" and "The Chase". The review concluded that the album s track "form one of the most consistent, forward-looking discographies of the decade, alternately noisy and sublime." Tiny Mix Tapes praised the album in 2012, stating that "Electronic music is often stigmatized as having a shelf-life like milk. Some trends from just a few years ago are already dated, yet Classics still sounds fresh. Sure, it doesn’t sound like it came out last week, but I would argue that many listeners would be shocked to hear that some of these songs are over a quarter century old." The review compared the album to Kraftwerk's Trans-Europe Express, Boards of Canada's Music Has the Right to Children and Burial's Untrue as electronic music "that sounds timeless" In The New Rolling Stone Album Guide (2004), gave the album four stars and noted that "[Atkins's] most important work post-Cybotron came under the moniker Model 500, whose singles including the great "No UFO's", ""Off to Battle" and "Night Drive (Time, Space, Transmat)" are collected on Classics"

== Track listing ==
All track written by Juan Atkins/Model 500

No.	Title	Length
1.	"No UFO's (remix)"	6:58
2.	"The Chase (Smooth mix)"	5:42
3.	"Off to Battle (remix)"	6:04
4.	"Night Drive (Time, Space, Transmat)"	6:04
5.	"Electric Entourage"	6:46
6.	"Electronic"	6:00
7.	"Ocean To Ocean (instrumental)"	6:42
8.	"Techno Music (M500 Version)"	5:35
9.	"Sound of Stereo"	6:51

== Credits ==
Credits adapted from Classics liner notes.

- Juan Atkins/Model 500 – writer, producer, performer
- Third Earth – art
