= Digital Solutions =

Studio album by Model 500
- Released: February 18, 2015
- Studio: Metroplex Studios; Elypsia Studios
- Genre: Techno
- Length: 44:38
- Label: Metroplex
- Producer: Juan Atkins; Mike Banks

Model 500 chronology
Mind and Body (1999)	Digital Solutions (2015)

Digital Solutions is the third studio album by Juan Atkins as Model 500. It was released by Metroplex on February 18, 2015. It is his first studio album under the pseudonym in 16 years, following from Deep Space (1995) and Mind and Body (1999). It includes additional production from Mike Banks.

== Critical reception ==
Professional ratings
Aggregate scores
Source	Rating
Metacritic	82/100
Review scores
Source	Rating
The Quietus	favorable
Resident Advisor	3.8/5
XLR8R	7.5/10

At Metacritic, which assigns a weighted average score out of 100 to reviews from mainstream critics, the album received an average score of 82, based on 4 reviews, indicating "universal acclaim".

Paul Clarke of Resident Advisor gave the album a 3.8 out of 5, writing, "Like techno's equivalent of '70s rock legends on a reunion tour, Atkins is past his prime but still perfectly capable of satisfying his fans." Albert Freeman of The Quietus wrote, "Apart from a few slow moments, the album is overall a heartfelt and thoughtful piece, well composed and sequenced from beginning to end, and it sometimes approaches his best work."

== Track listing ==
All tracks are written by Juan Atkins, except "Electric Night", "Standing in Tomorrow", and "The Groove" by Juan Atkins and Mike Banks.

No.	Title	Length
1.	"Hi NRG"	4:38
2.	"Electric Night"	4:11
3.	"Standing in Tomorrow"	4:50
4.	"Encounter"	5:41
5.	"Storm"	5:37
6.	"The Groove"	4:41
7.	"Station"	3:24
8.	"Digital Solutions"	5:11
9.	"Control"	6:20

== Personnel ==
Credits adapted from liner notes.

- Juan Atkins – production
- Mike Banks – production (2, 3, 6)
- Amp Fiddler – keyboards (1)
- Andy G – guitar (6)
- Gregory Lacour – engineering
- Arnold Steiner – design
