= DJ Assault =

American musician (born 1977)

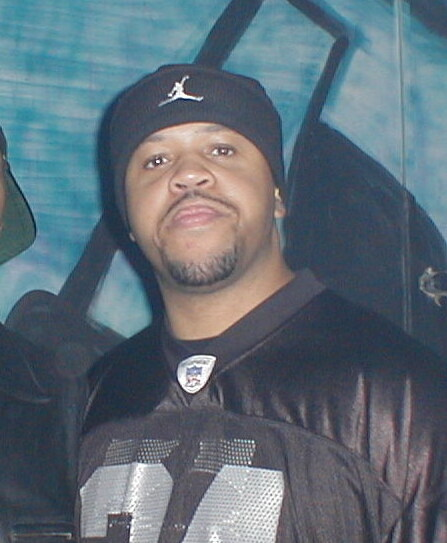
- DJ Assault in 2003

Background information
- Also known as: Craig Diamonds
- Born: Craig De Shan Adams; October 19, 1977 (age 48); Detroit, Michigan, U.S.
- Genres: Ghettotech; Detroit booty; techno; house
- Label: Jefferson Ave

Craig De Shan Adams (born October 19, 1977), better known as DJ Assault or Craig Diamonds, is an American electronic musician and producer known for his work with Detroit booty music and the ghettotech genre.

== Biography ==
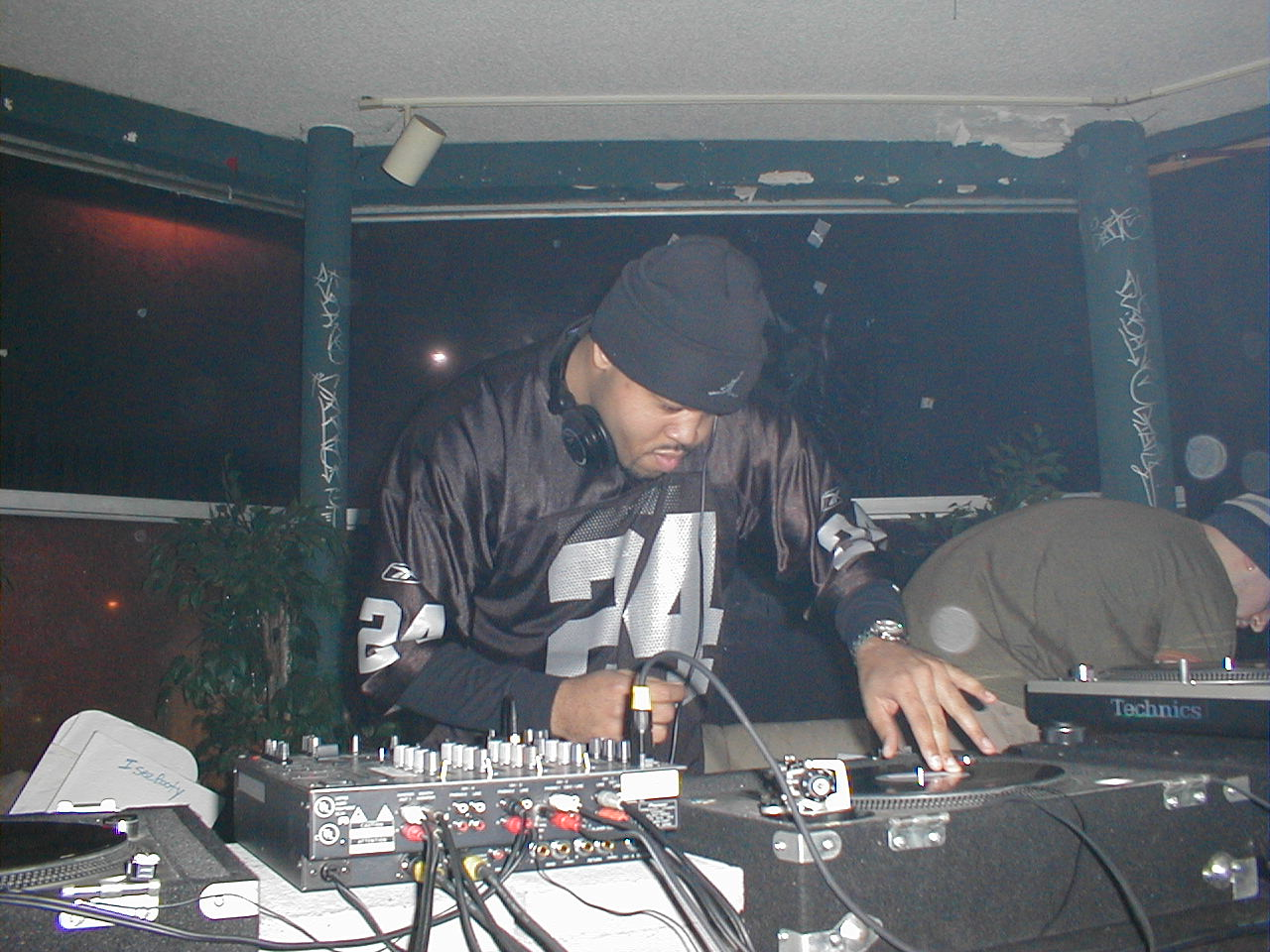
DJ Assault playing in Massachusetts in 2003

Adams was born in Detroit and relocated to the suburbs as a child. Growing up he listened to techno and house stations on the radio, such as the Electrifying Mojo on WMXD, which influenced his sound significantly. He started DJing at age 12 at local high school parties. When he later moved for to Atlanta college, he was a member of rap duo Assault-n-Battery that pulled from Atlanta's bass scene. Hip-hop elements was incorporated into his later electronic work.

Upon returning to Detroit in the '90s, Adams released a series of singles under the name DJ Assault with producer Mr. De' on Electrofunk Records and Assault Rifle Records. The success of the tracks "Sex on the Beach" and "Ass and Titties" in the mid-'90s lifted him to fame. In the mid-2000s, he founded the label Jefferson Ave.

In 2023, Berlin club Kater Blau and radio station HÖR Berlin canceled DJ Assault performances due to unspecified social media posts of the artist. This was met with pushback from some club goers.

Adams is known for his comedic and explicit lyrics. He has rejected the categorization of his music as "ghettotech". Adams has cited the Wizard, Farley Jackmaster Funk, Bad Boy Bill, Mike Hitman Wilson, and Julian "Jumpin" Perez as influences.
