= Eddie Fowlkes =

American techno DJ and record producer (born 1962)

- Also known as: Eddie "Flashin" Fowlkes
- Born: December 24, 1962 (age 63); Detroit, Michigan, U.S.
- Genres: Techno; house
- Occupations: DJ; record producer; record-label owner
- Years active: 1978–present
- Labels: Metroplex; Tresor; City Boy; 430 West; Peacefrog

Eddie Fowlkes (born December 24, 1962) is an American techno and house DJ regarded as one of the architects of the early Detroit techno scene. The Detroit Historical Museum's 2003 exhibition Techno: Detroit's Gift to the World identified Fowlkes, Juan Atkins, Derrick May, and Kevin Saunderson as four musicians from Detroit who created techno.

== Biography ==
Fowlkes was born on December 24, 1962, in Detroit, Michigan. After attending a Charivari party with his older sisters in 1978 and watching DJ Darryl Shannon mix records, Fowlkes asked for a mixer for Christmas and subsequently began DJing.

Fowlkes met Atkins while attending Eastern Michigan University and became part of Atkins's Deep Space DJ collective, whose members included May, Art Payne, and Keith Martin. May and Fowlkes were also roommates. Saunderson later said that watching Fowlkes perform at a fraternity party inspired him to become involved with the Deep Space collective and improve as a DJ.

After hearing Cybotron perform, Fowlkes expanded his focus from DJing to record production. He borrowed equipment from Atkins, taught himself to play keyboards, and built a studio in his bedroom while living with May.

His first release under his own name was "Goodbye Kiss", issued by Metroplex in 1986.

Although Atkins, May, and Saunderson are commonly grouped as the "Belleville Three", some sources have placed Fowlkes alongside them in accounts of techno's origins. In 2003, the Detroit Historical Museum described Atkins, Fowlkes, May, and Saunderson as four young men from metropolitan Detroit who created techno. In 2012, Todd L. Burns of Resident Advisor called Fowlkes "the Belleville Fourth". In a 2022 master's thesis, Keaton Soto-Olson used the term "the Detroit Four" to include Fowlkes as an integral participant in techno's origins.

Fowlkes has said that disagreements with May's manager and the deterioration of his relationship with May contributed to his exclusion from some histories of the genre. He nevertheless participated in projects documenting techno's development.

In 1991, Fowlkes released Detroit Techno Soul on M.I.D. (Made in Detroit). He used the term "techno soul" to describe an approach informed by both Detroit techno and house music. He subsequently recorded The Birth of Technosoul with 3MB, the duo of Moritz von Oswald and Thomas Fehlmann. The album was released by Tresor Records in 1993.

Fowlkes's music achieved recognition in Europe before receiving comparable attention in the United States, a pattern also experienced by other Detroit techno artists. He founded City Boy Records in 1993 and also operates its Detroit Wax imprint.

Fowlkes's handprints are displayed in the Detroit Historical Museum's Legends Plaza, where he is recognized as a techno pioneer.

== Discography ==
=== Albums ===
- 3MB Featuring Eddie 'Flashin' Fowlkes (with 3MB, Tresor, 1992)
- Technosoul (with 3MB, Tresor, 1993)
- Black Technosoul (Tresor, 1996)
- Niko Marks & City Boy Players Feat. Mr Eddie Fowlkes (with Niko Marks and City Boy Players, SSR, 1999)
- Moving to a Diffrent Beat (City Boy, 2003)
- Welcome to My World (Submerge Recordings and City Boy, 2007)

=== Singles and EPs ===
- Goodbye Kiss (Metroplex, 1986)
- Get It Live / In the Mix (Metroplex, 1987)
- Standing in the Rain / Time to Express (Spinnin' Records, 1989)
- Inequality (430 West, 1991)
- Detroit Techno Soul (with Santonio Echols and Art Forest, M.I.D. Records, 1991)
- The Project (with Blake Baxter, Tresor, 1992)
- Passion (Groove Kissing, 1992)
- Turn Me Out (with Santonio Echols, M.I.D. Records, 1992)
- Night Creepin' (Simply Soul, 1993)
- Mad in Detroit! EP (United Records, 1993)
- One Dance / Stella (Global Cuts, 1993)]
- I'm a Winner Not a Loser (Infonet, 1993)
- The Truth (Back to Basics, 1995)
- Let Us Pray (featuring Maurissa Rose, Bold! Soul Records, 1995)
- Stella 2 (Peacefrog Records, 1995)
- Groovin / C.B.R (Tresor, 1996)
- Deep Pit (Dance Pool, 1997)
- Soul Train (Paper Recordings, 1998)
- Oh Lord E.P. (Azuli Records, 1999)
- Angel in My Pocket (Undaground Therapy Muzik, 2000)
- My Soul (Archiv #05) (Tresor, 2002)
- Detroit Beat Down Sounds & Grooves Vol. 1 (City Boy, 2003)
- Island / Feel So (City Boy, 2005)
- August 13th / Save Message (City Boy, 2007)
- Headbanger / Rider (Detroit Wax, 2008)
- Unsung Hero (Detroit Wax, 2012)
- That's What Makes a Track (Detroit Wax, 2013)
- That's What I Think About EP (Defected, 2015)
- D to the Lu (featuring Na Dee, Detroit Wax, 2017)
- Technosoul Vol. 1 (Detroit Wax, 2018)
- Technosoul Vol. 2 (Detroit Wax, 2018)
- D-Town Playaz (with Loco Dice, En Couleur, 2020)
- Plant 19 EP (Shift Imprint, 2020)
- Deepcover (MUGA, 2022)
- Ahyee EP (Classic, 2023)
- Forever (Rekids, 2023)

== Works cited ==
- Sicko, Dan (1999). Techno Rebels: The Renegades of Electronic Funk. The Archive of Contemporary Music. New York: Billboard Books. ISBN 978-0-8230-8428-9. OCLC 40675151.
