= Juan Atkins =

American record producer and DJ (1962–2026)

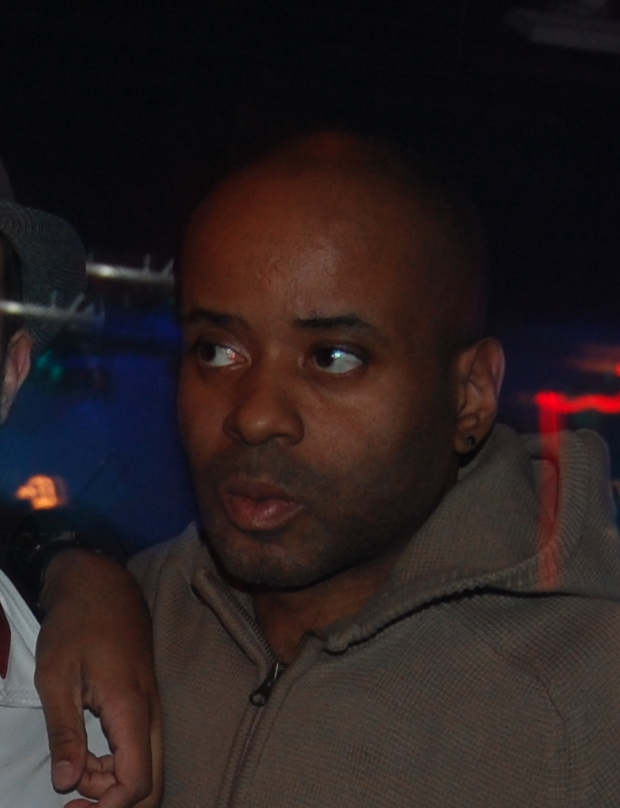
- Atkins in 2010

Background information
- Also known as: Model 500; Infiniti
- Born: September 12, 1962; Detroit, Michigan, U.S.
- Died: October 31, 2026 (aged 64) Mexico City, Mexico
- Genre: Detroit techno
- Occupations: Record producer; DJ
- Years active: 1980–2026
- Labels: Metroplex; Tresor Records; Om
- Member of: The Belleville Three; Cybotron; Borderland

Juan Atkins (September 12, 1962 – October 31, 2026), also known as Model 500 and Infiniti, and part of the bands Cybotron and Borderland., was an American musician, record producer and DJ. With Kevin Saunderson and Derrick May he was part of the informal group the Belleville Three, who were seen as scene leaders in the early days of Detroit techno. He has been described by commentators and fellow musicians as "the originator of techno," "the original pioneer of Detroit techno", "the guy who made techno when nobody was calling it techno" and "not merely one participant among many, [but]... foundational" to the genre.

== Early life ==
Juan Atkins was born in Detroit, Michigan, on September 12, 1962 to teenage parents. His father worked as a barber and in the auto industry, but was also a drug dealer and was imprisoned for manslaughter when Atkins was very young and was in and out of jail for most of his life - however he was also a concert promoter and saxophonist and encouraged his son's own musical inclinations, and bought Atkins instruments starting with a guitar. At an early age, Atkins played guitar and bass guitar in funk/garage bands with his friends. After his father's imprisonment, he was mainly raised by his grandmother in the suburb of Belleville, Michigan, where he said it was harder to meet other musicians, which was a partial influence on him turning to electronic composition. He also obsessively listened to local DJ The Electrifying Mojo on the radio, and became fascinated by European acts like Gary Numan and The Human League. In junior high school, he met Derrick May and Kevin Saunderson. The three would later be known as the Belleville Three. At the age of 15-16, he persuaded his grandmother to buy him his first synthesizer, a Korg MS-10.

== Career ==
=== Cybotron (1980–1985) ===
Atkins formed Cybotron with Richard "3070" Davis, a Vietnam War veteran he met in a music class at Washtenaw Community College. The pair's first finished piece, "Cosmic Raindance", became the B-side of their debut single, "Alleys of Your Mind", which they released in early 1981 on their own Deep Space Records label. Airplay from the Detroit radio DJ The Electrifying Mojo made the record a local hit, and Atkins later said it was the first record he described as "techno", a term he took from Alvin Toffler's writing on "techno-rebels". Cybotron followed it with "Cosmic Cars", "Clear" and "Techno City", and their debut studio album, Enter, was released in 1983. Atkins and Davis split in 1985 over artistic differences; Davis continued Cybotron with John Housely until 1995.

=== Metroplex, Model 500 and the naming of techno (1985–1988) ===
In 1985 Atkins founded the record label Metroplex, its name a contraction of "metropolitan complex", a concept from Toffler's The Third Wave. The same year he began releasing solo records as Model 500, starting with "No UFO's" and "Night Drive (Thru-Babylon)". Metroplex also issued early records by Kevin Saunderson and Eddie Fowlkes.

In 1987 and 1988 the British northern soul DJ and record executive Neil Rushton, who ran the Kool Kat label and at one point managed Atkins, Derrick May and Saunderson, compiled a collection of Detroit music for Virgin Records' 10 Records imprint. Its working title was The House Sound of Detroit, but after Atkins contributed a track called "Techno Music", the compilation was released in 1988 as Techno! The New Dance Sound of Detroit, helping to fix "techno" as the name of the genre.

=== UK remixes and touring (1987–1991) ===
Through Rushton, Atkins became one of the first American producers to remix British house records, starting with a 1987 remix of "House Sensation" by the Birmingham trio Liaz. His first performance in the UK was at an acid house party in Birmingham, and he later recalled that playing to a crowd of around 5,000 at a London film studio made him realise how far the music had travelled.

In 1989 Atkins remixed a run of British singles, including the Style Council's cover of Joe Smooth's "Promised Land", the Beloved's "Your Love Takes Me Higher", and the #7 chart hit "Wait!" by Robert Howard and Kym Mazelle. He also remixed May's "Strings of Life" as "Strings of Life '89 (Juan's Magic Mix)" for UK and European release.

In Detroit, he worked with Fowlkes and Anthony "Shake" Shakir on Rona Johnson's 1990 single "By Your Side", and with Fowlkes released the 1991 tracks "Escape" and "Modulation" as outPut, which incorporated elements of British breakbeat hardcore and Belgian rave. His Metroplex studio also hosted young producers from outside the city; Derrick Carter later recalled Atkins guiding the session that produced Carter, Mark Farina and Chris Nazuka's "Teardrops of Yesterday".

=== Berlin and Tresor (1991–1990s) ===
Around the turn of the 1990s, Thomas Fehlmann, Moritz von Oswald and Mark Ernestus visited Detroit to buy records and second-hand synthesizers. Atkins later met Fehlmann again in London, at the offices of ZTT Records, and Fehlmann invited him to Berlin to record. A booking at the newly opened Tresor club paid for the trip. Atkins played his first Tresor set alongside Jeff Mills; having lost his records at the airport, he spent the day buying replacements at the Hard Wax record shop. He joined Fehlmann and von Oswald's 3MB ("3 Men in Berlin") project, playing the "third man" role which Eddie Fowlkes also sometimes filled, and in 1992 Tresor released the album 3MB featuring Magic Juan Atkins, which includes "Jazz Is the Teacher". The collaboration began a working relationship with Tresor that lasted more than 30 years.

=== R&S, Infiniti and international collaborations (1992–1999) ===
During the 1990s Atkins released Model 500 records through the Belgian label R&S Records, including the Sonic Sunset EP (1994) and the album Deep Space (1995), parts of which were recorded at Love Park studio in Berlin. The 1995 Model 500 single "Starlight", released on Metroplex, had additional production by von Oswald.

His more stripped-down techno appeared under the alias Infiniti. Tresor collected the early Infiniti singles as The Infiniti Collection (1996) and released a new Infiniti album, Skynet, in September 1998. A Juan Atkins mix album followed on Wax Trax! later in 1998, and the second Model 500 album, Mind and Body, was released on R&S in 1999.

Atkins also worked with producers in the Netherlands and the UK. With the Amsterdam producer Orlando Voorn he released "Industrial Metal" as Frequency vs Atkins in 1992 on Lower East Side Records, and the pair worked on the Infiniti track "Game One" in 1994. In London he recorded with 4hero's Marc Mac at the Reinforced Records studio; one result, "The Fusion Formula (The Metamorphosis)", appeared on the album by the duo's alias Jacob's Optical Stairway, released by R&S. He was also remixed by the drum and bass producer Alex Reece in 1995.

=== Later work (2000–2018) ===
Atkins released the compilation Legends Vol. 1 on OM Records in 2001, and Tresor issued the retrospective 20 Years Metroplex: 1985–2005 in 2005. In 2010 Model 500 returned with new material as a group, with Atkins joined by Mike Banks of Underground Resistance, Mark Taylor and DJ Skurge. The same year he remixed the New York band Psychic Ills' "Mantis" for RVNG Intl.'s FRKWYS series. In 2012 Tresor marked its 250th release with Infiniti – The Remixes, a series of EPs on which Fehlmann, Function, Redshape and others reworked Infiniti tracks.

He was also one half of the duo Borderland with Moritz von Oswald. The duo released Borderland on Tresor in 2013 and Transport in 2016, the latter marking the label's 25th anniversary. In 2014 Atkins remixed "Mecca" by the British band Wild Beasts for the special edition of their album Present Tense. Digital Solutions, the third Model 500 album and the first in 16 years, was released on Metroplex in 2015, with additional production from Banks. To celebrate the 30th anniversary of Metroplex that year, Atkins collaborated with VAVA Eyewear.

In 2017 Atkins and Voorn released Mind Merge, their first full album together as Frequency vs Atkins, on the Berlin label Out-er. Metroplex also issued the first remixes of "No UFO's", by Moodymann and Luciano. In 2018 he remixed "Asa Nisi Masa" by As One, the alias of the British producer Kirk Degiorgio.

=== Cybotron revival and final years (2019–2026) ===
In 2018 Atkins revived Cybotron with Laurens von Oswald and the Detroit DJ Tameko J. Williams (DJ Maaco). The group, which had never performed live, played its first concert at the Barbican Centre in London on April 12, 2019, in a show with the visual studio Pilot, and went on to play the Dekmantel festival that summer. Tresor released the Cybotron EP Maintain the Golden Ratio in 2023, the project's first release in 28 years. That year Atkins also remixed Carl Cox's "Deep Space X" for a Record Store Day release.

== Artistry ==
John Bush of AllMusic suggests that Atkins "explor[ed] his vision of a futuristic music that welded the more cosmic side of Parliament Funkadelic with the rigid computer synth pop embodied by Kraftwerk and the techno-futurist possibilities described by sociologist Alvin Toffler". Aesthetically, Atkins drew upon dystopian science fiction narratives to construct his sonic landscapes. Later in his career, he began incorporating elements of contemporary dance music, while retaining what critics consider to be his signature sense of melody. He stated that George Clinton's bands Parliament and Funkadelic were important to his "musical awakening", and named Funkadelic's "Flash Light" as the record closest to his own sound. He grew up listening to The Electrifying Mojo's radio shows. He also acknowledged Kraftwerk as an influence on his music, though he said that when he first heard "The Robots" on Mojo's show he was already making similar music, and he described their development as "parallel"; he contrasted Kraftwerk's "precise and regimented" sound with his own looser, more organic approach.

Commentators and musicians have pointed out that although associated with techno - which is assumed to have a four to the floor rhythm - Atkins' music always maintained a core of electro and funk, and Atkins has been quoted as saying "I don't separate techno and electro". Reviewing Digital Solutions in The Wire, Joe Muggs noted its predecessor Mind and Body had drawn on drum and bass and hip hop, and argued that Atkins's electro remained rooted in funk rhythm.

The academic Sean Albiez has described Cybotron as exploring Toffler's futurist sociology in Future Shock and The Third Wave, and developing a philosophy that probed the utopian/dystopian dichotomy of science fiction. Atkins took both the word "techno" and the name of his Metroplex label from Toffler's writing, and said the music's message was simply "the future".

The cultural theorist Kodwo Eshun, one of the leading commentators of Afrofuturism, devoted a chapter of his 1998 book More Brilliant than the Sun: Adventures in Sonic Fiction to Cybotron, Model 500 and the Electrifying Mojo. Eshun acknowledged Detroit techno's open debt to Kraftwerk, comparing their relationship to techno with that of Muddy Waters to the Rolling Stones, but argued that Detroit reversed the usual transatlantic current in which British pop borrowed from American music. On Cybotron's "Techno City", Davis sang the chorus in the accent of British new romantic synth-pop, which Eshun heard as a way of making techno's estrangement from America audible. He read "Techno City", which Davis said was inspired by Fritz Lang's Metropolis and Toffler's The Third Wave, as a city in time, and as an example of "sonic fiction": music that imagines escape routes from the urban present rather than representing "the street" in the generally realist manner of hip hop. Drawing on the dedication on Cybotron's Enter, he described Atkins's project as "technofication", an awareness of the co-evolution of human and machine. Eshun's close readings of "No UFO's", with its two drum machines running separately programmed parts and its affectless vocal, and of "Night Drive (Thru-Babylon)", which he said launched "the Darkside of Detroit Techno", treated the records as works of sonic science fiction.

Eshun also discussed Atkins's working methods and personas. He cited Atkins's account of making drum sounds from white and pink noise on his Korg MS-10 before hearing Kraftwerk use the same technique on The Man-Machine, and argued that by calling himself Model 500 Atkins embraced the machine state previously regarded as dehumanizing: presenting the producer as type of cyborg, or "the next model". He treated Atkins's many aliases, including Model 500, Channel One, Audiotech and Infiniti, as "heteronyms" that dispersed the artist across parallel identities, and quoted Atkins's remark that he was "probably more interested in Ford's robots than Berry Gordy's music". It is notable, though that Atkins later qualified that statement as "not properly documented" and emphasised his respect for Gordy: "For a black man in America to achieve what he did in that era was a hell of a feat and I take my hat off to that man”.

Atkins distinguished between his main aliases: he described Model 500 as "a continuation of Cybotron" and the outlet for his more song-oriented material with lyrics and vocals, while Infiniti carried his harder, "basement style" techno.

== Death and legacy ==
Atkins died on October 31, 2026, at the age of 64. He was found unresponsive in a hotel room in Mexico City before a scheduled performance at YuYu Cine Club; he was taken to a hospital, where he was pronounced dead.

John Bush of AllMusic conferred the title of "godfather of techno" on Atkins, and said his discography is "perhaps the most influential body of work in the field of techno". He stated: "Though it's often difficult (and misleading) to pick the precise genesis for any style of music, the easiest choice for techno is an Atkins release, the 1983 electro track 'Clear,' recorded by Atkins and Rick Davis as Cybotron." Mixmag has described him as "the original pioneer of Detroit techno". Following his death, his fellow Detroit artists called him "the originator of techno," [Kevin Saunderson], "the guy who made techno when nobody was calling it techno" [Carl Craig], and "not merely one participant among many, [but]... foundational" to the genre [Jeff Mills]. The German DJ WestBam has said that without Atkins, his generation of techno DJs "would be nothing". In 2003 the Detroit Historical Museum opened the exhibition Techno: Detroit's Gift to the World, which told the story of how Atkins, Eddie Fowlkes, Derrick May and Kevin Saunderson created the genre.

Cybotron has been cited as a formative influence on the Detroit electro duos Drexciya and Aux 88 - who began their career covering his Model 500 tracks. Via these, influence has been traced directly to Detroit's faster dancer-oriented sound known as ghettotech, and to the electroclash of Adult. I-F, International DeeJay Gigolos and related artists. They were also highly influential on - and often sampled in - UK rave, jungle and drum'n'bass.

Detroit techno found an early audience in Scotland, particularly in Glasgow, where the promoter Martin Mackay, founder of the Rubadub record shop and of Paisley's Club 69, regularly booked Detroit artists. Atkins played a Metroplex Records party at the Arches in 1998, and Model 500's first live performance in Scotland took place at the Glasgow School of Art in April 2008, during the Triptych festival and as part of Rubadub's 16th-birthday celebrations. The following generation of Glasgow DJs and electronic producers around the Numbers and LuckyMe collectives drew heavily on Detroit electro and techno: Rustie was a fan of Atkins, Drexciya and Underground Resistance, and Hudson Mohawke cited hearing Missy Elliott mixed with Detroit techno at the Sub Club's Optimo night as a starting point for his own production. Both producers were later credited with helping to fuse trap rap with electronic dance music, a style taken up by American EDM producers.

Atkins's early records were also absorbed into hip hop and R&B. Sir Mix-a-Lot's "Baby Got Back" (1992) sampled "Technicolor", which Atkins released as Channel One, and Missy Elliott's 2005 single "Lose Control" sampled Cybotron's "Clear", resulting in a writing credit for Atkins.

== Discography ==
=== Studio albums ===
- 3MB Featuring Magic Juan Atkins (1992) (with Thomas Fehlmann and Moritz von Oswald, as 3MB Featuring Magic Juan Atkins)
- Deep Space (1995) (as Model 500)
- Skynet (1998) (as Infiniti)
- Mind and Body (1999) (as Model 500)
- The Berlin Sessions (2005)
- Borderland (2013) (with Moritz von Oswald, as Borderland)
- Digital Solutions (2015) (as Model 500)
- Transport (2016) (with Moritz von Oswald, as Borderland)
- Mind Merge LP (2017) (with Orlando Voorn, as Frequency vs Atkins)

=== Compilation albums ===
- Classics (1993) (as Model 500)
- The Infiniti Collection (1996) (as Infiniti)
- Wax Trax! MasterMix Volume 1 (1998)
- 20 Years 1985 - 2005 (2005)

=== EPs ===
- The True Techno EP (1992) (as Model 500)
- The Future Sound EP (1993)

=== Singles ===
- "No UFO's" (1985) (as Model 500)
- "Night Drive" (1985) (as Model 500)
- "Testing 1-2" (1986) (as Model 500)
- "Play It Cool" (1986) (as Model 500)
- "Technicolor" (1986) (with Doug Craig, as Channel One)
- "It's Channel One" (1987) (with Doug Craig, as Channel One)
- "Sound of Stereo" (1987) (as Model 500)
- "Make Some Noise" (1987) (as Model 500)
- "Beat Track" (1987)
- "Interference" (1988) (as Model 500)
- "The Chase" (1989) (as Model 500)
- "Ocean to Ocean" (1990) (as Model 500)
- "Jazz Is the Teacher" (1993) (with Thomas Fehlmann and Moritz von Oswald, as M500 & 3MB)
- "I See the Light" (1993) (as Model 500)
- "Sonic Sunset" (1994) (as Model 500)
- "The Flow" (1995) (as Model 500)
- "Starlight" (1995) (as Model 500)
- "I Wanna Be There" (1996) (as Model 500)
- "Be Brave" (1998) (as Model 500)
- "Update" (2002) (as Model 600)
- "Outer Space" (2004) (as Model 500)
- "OFI" / "Huesca" (2010) (as Model 500)
- "Control" (2012) (as Model 500)
- "Riod" (2016) (with Moritz von Oswald, as Borderland)

== Filmography ==
=== Feature films ===
- God Said Give 'Em Drum Machines (2022)
- High Tech Soul (2006)
- Never Stop: A Music That Resists (2017)

=== Short films ===
- Black to Techno (2019)
