= The Belleville Three =

Three musicians from Detroit

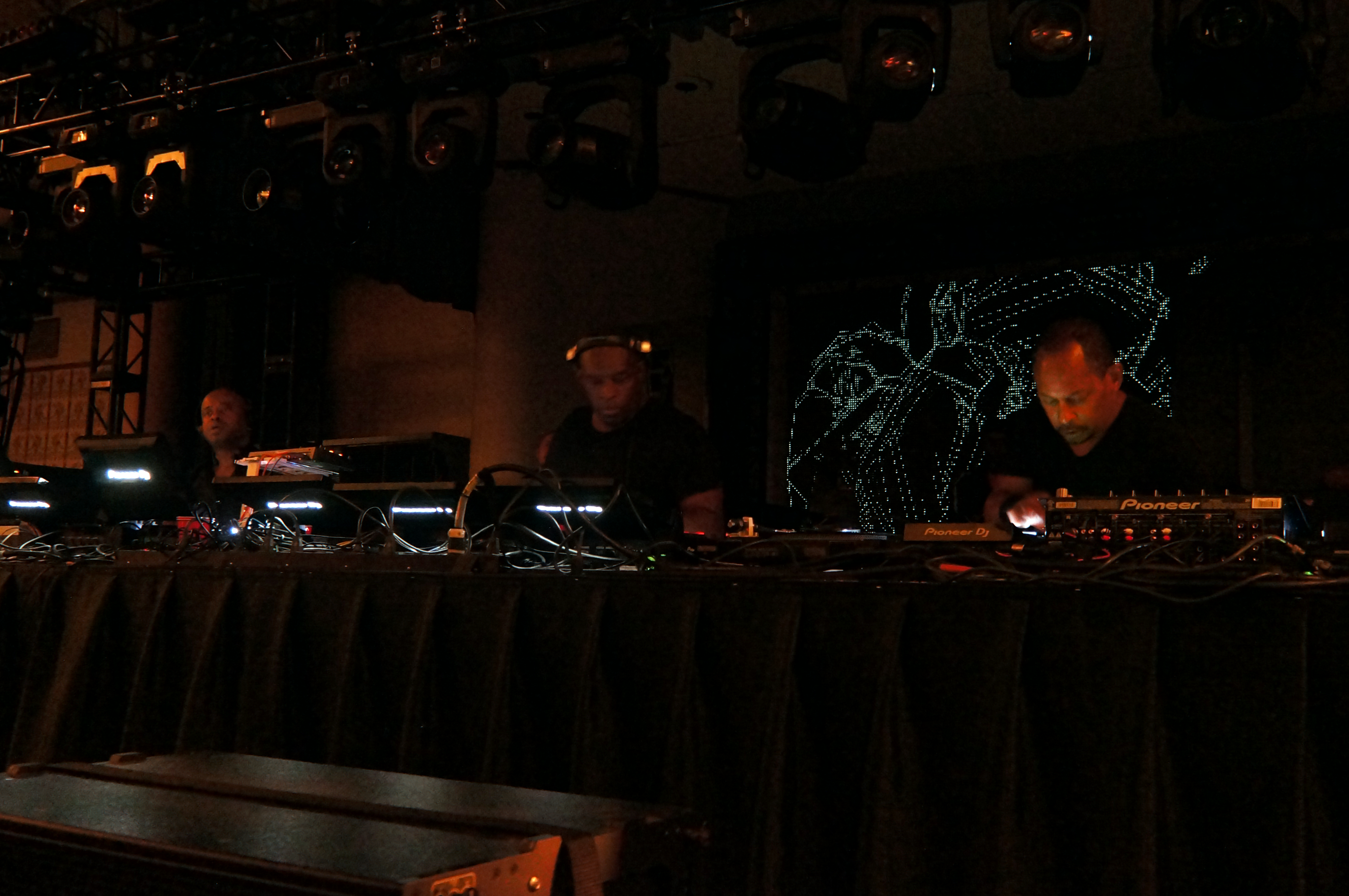
- The Belleville Three performing at the Detroit Masonic Temple in 2017. From left to right: Juan Atkins, Kevin Saunderson, and Derrick May

Background information
- Origin: Belleville, Michigan
- Genre: Techno
- Label: Blue Raincoat Music
- Members: Juan Atkins (The Initiator); Derrick May (The Innovator); Kevin Saunderson (The Elevator)

The Belleville Three were three American musicians, Juan Atkins (1964–2026), Derrick May, and Kevin Saunderson, who are credited with inventing the genre of techno in Belleville, Michigan.

== Origins ==
Kevin Saunderson was born in Brooklyn, New York. At the age of nine he moved to Michigan, where he attended Belleville High School in Belleville, a town some 30 miles from Detroit, in the more rural area near its suburbs. In school he befriended Derrick May and Juan Atkins, both of whom had been born in Detroit but later moved to Belleville. The three were among the few black students in their high school, and Saunderson later commented, "we three kind of gelled right away." The setting affected how they experienced music. "We perceived the music differently than you would if you encountered it in dance clubs. We'd sit back with the lights off and listen to records by Bootsy and Yellow Magic Orchestra. We never took it as just entertainment, we took it as a serious philosophy," recalled May. Belleville was located near several automobile factories, which provided well-paying jobs to a racially integrated workforce. "Everybody was equal," Atkins explained in an interview. "So what happened is that you’ve got this environment with kids that come up somewhat snobby, ‘cos hey, their parents are making money working at Ford or GM or Chrysler, been elevated to a foreman, maybe even a white-collar job."

The three teenage friends bonded while listening to an eclectic mix of music: Kraftwerk, Parliament, Prince, the B-52s. The electronic and funk sounds that influenced the Belleville Three came primarily from a 5-hour late-night radio show called The Midnight Funk Association, broadcast in Detroit by DJ Charles "The Electrifying Mojo" Johnson on WGPR. Juan Atkins was inspired to buy a synthesizer after hearing Parliament. Atkins was also the first in the group to take up turntables, teaching May and Saunderson how to DJ.

Under the name Deep Space Soundworks, Atkins and May began to DJ on Detroit's party circuit. By 1981, Johnson was playing the record mixes recorded by the Belleville Three, who were also branching out to work with other musicians. The trio traveled to Chicago to investigate the house music scene there, particularly Chicago DJs Ron Hardy and Frankie Knuckles. The trio began to formulate the synthesis of this dance music with the mechanical sounds of groups like Kraftwerk, in a way that reflected post-industrialist Detroit. An obsession with the future and its machines is reflected in much of their music, because, according to Atkins, Detroit is the most advanced in the transition away from industrialism.

== First wave of Detroit techno ==
While attending Washtenaw Community College, Atkins met Rick Davis and formed Cybotron with him. Their first single "Alleys of Your Mind"—recorded on their Deep Space label in 1981—sold 15,000 copies, and the success of two follow-up singles, "Cosmic Cars" and "Clear," led the California-based label Fantasy to sign the duo and release their album, Enter. After Cybotron split due to creative differences, Atkins began recording as Model 500 on his own label, Metroplex, in 1985. His landmark single, "No UFOs," soon arrived. Eddie "Flashin" Fowlkes, Derrick May, and Kevin Saunderson also recorded on Metroplex.

Although the Detroit musicians—the Belleville Three and other early pioneers like Fowlkes and James Pennington—were a close-knit group who shared equipment and studio space, and who helped each other with projects, friction developed. Each member of the Belleville Three branched off on his own record label. May's Transmat began as a sublabel imprint of Metroplex. Saunderson founded KMS based on his own initials. They set up shop in close proximity to one another, in Detroit's Eastern Market district.

All of the Belleville Three have worked under many different names and titles. Derrick May saw great success under the name Rhythim is Rhythim, his moniker when he released his landmark "Strings of Life." Kevin Saunderson's most commercially recognized project was Inner City with vocalist Paris Grey. Juan Atkins has been lauded as the "Godfather of Techno," while May is thought of as the "Innovator" and Saunderson is often referred to as the "Elevator."

Inspired by Chicago's house clubs, May, Atkins and Saunderson started a club of their own in downtown Detroit, named the Music Institute. The club helped unite a previously scattered scene into an underground "family," where Saunderson, Atkins and May, DJed with fellow pioneers like Fowlkes and Blake Baxter. It allowed for collaboration, and helped inspire what would become the second wave of Detroit-area techno, which included artists whom the Belleville Three had influenced and mentored.

== Success abroad ==
In 1988, dance music entrepreneur Neil Rushton approached the Belleville Three to license their work for release in the UK. To define the Detroit sound as being distinct from Chicago house, Rushton and the Belleville Three chose the word "techno" for their tracks, a term that Atkins had been using since his Cybotron days ("Techno City" was an early single). However, the trio from Belleville had some reservations about the culture that surrounded the drug-filled techno subculture abroad. Derrick May in particular continues to advocate that drugs are not necessary to participate in good music.

== The Movement ==
In 2000, the first annual Detroit Electronic Music Festival was held, and in 2004 May assumed control of the festival, renamed Movement. He invested his own funds into the festival, and "got severely wounded financially." Saunderson helmed the festival, renamed FUSE IN, the following year. Saunderson, May and Carl Craig all performed but did not produce the festival in 2006, when it was again called Movement. Saunderson returned to perform at the 2007 Movement as well.

== Collaboration as the Belleville Three ==
In 2017, Atkins, Saunderson and May began working on the Belleville Three as an official collaborative effort. Despite being labelled as the Belleville Three since the late 1980s, due in no small part to the British press, they had resisted official collaboration in the hope of distancing themselves from that moniker. However, three decades later it was clear that the mantle of The Belleville Three had stayed intact, and there was a clear demand to see them operate as a group. They launched this project at Coachella 2017.

The Belleville Three continue to tour internationally. Derrick May says that his mission continues to be "to save the world from bad music."

== See also ==
- Detroit techno
- Techno
