= Ghettotech =

Genre of electronic music originating from Detroit

- Stylistic origins: Ghetto house; electro; Detroit techno; Miami bass
- Cultural origins: Early–mid-1990s, Detroit and Chicago, United States

Regional scenes
- United Kingdom; Detroit; Chicago

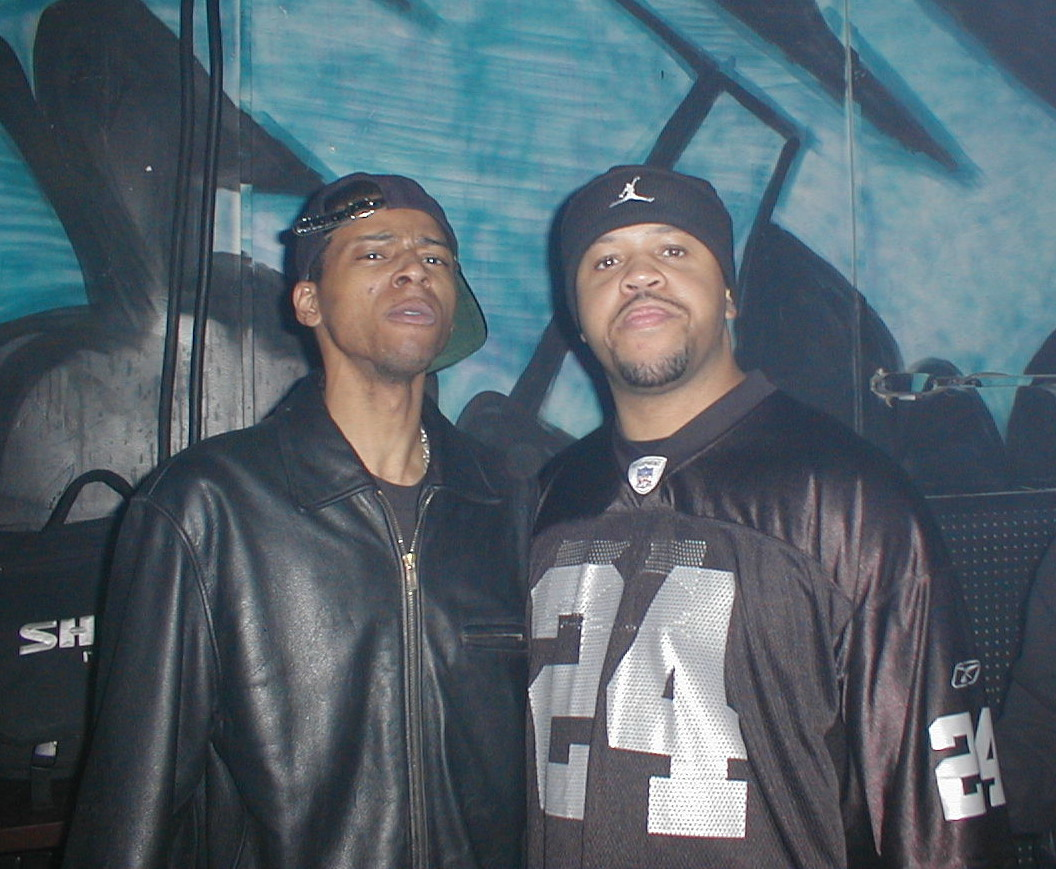
DJ Funk (left) with DJ Assault

Ghettotech (also known as Detroit club) is a genre of electronic music originating from Detroit. It combines elements of Chicago's ghetto house with electro, Detroit techno, and Miami bass.

== Overview ==
Former Detroit music journalist for the Detroit Metro Times, Hobey Echlin describes ghettotech as a genre that combines "techno's fast beats with rap's call-and-response." It features four-on-the-floor rhythms and is usually faster than most other dance music genres, at roughly 145 to 160 BPM. Vocals are often repetitive, crude, and pornographic. As DJ Godfather puts it, "the beats are really gritty, really raw, nothing polished."

Ghettotech was born as a DJing style in the late 1980s, inspired by the eclecticism of The Electrifying Mojo and the fast-paced mixing and turntablism of Jeff "The Wizard" Mills. DJs would mix multiple genres including jungle, ghetto house, hip hop, R&B, electro and Detroit techno. The music of 2 Live Crew is also cited as influential to the genre.

A Detroit ghettotech style of dancing is called the jit. This dance style relies heavily on fast footwork combinations, drops, spins and improvisations. The roots of jit date back to Detroit jitterbugs in the 1970s. Chicago's equivalent dance style is Juke, where the focus is on footwork dating back to the late 1980s.

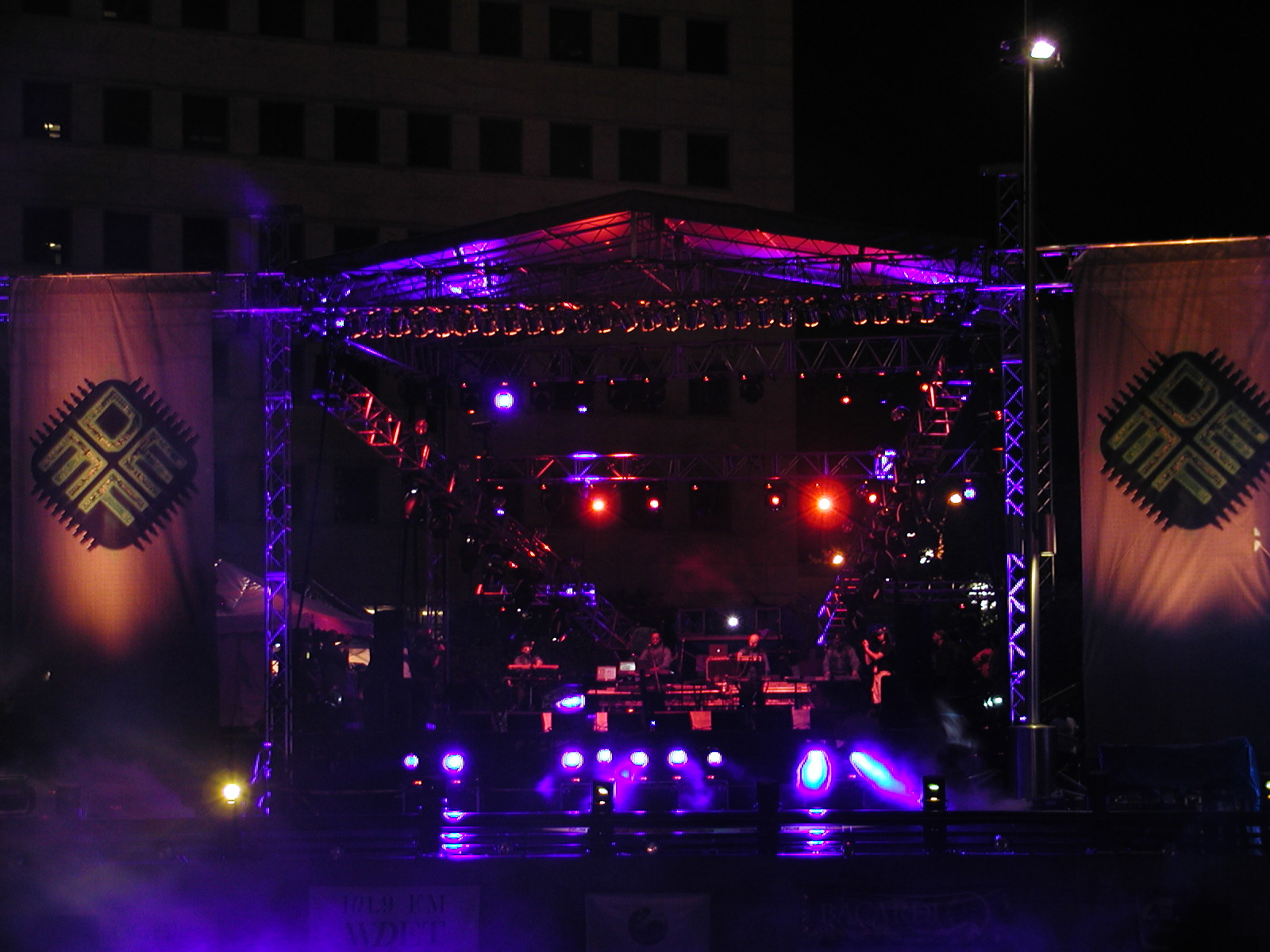
Amidst the Detroit Electronic Music Festival, Ghettotech has been able to maintain a regional staple for the event and proves to be persistent in its appearances.

Ghettotech was an integral part of the Detroit Electronic Music Festival, an annual event. At this festival, Ghettotech serves to be between the techno and hip-hop scenes respectively and allow this younger audience into a side of electronic music not previously capable. This introduction of techno in a conventionally hip-hop centered festival allowed for otherwise unseen experiences for the festival-goers and allowed for more diverse experiences and an in to a different branch of music entirely. As a genre, Ghettotech also proves to show the ability of genres to be ever-changing and the impact that location can make on a genre as a whole as also seen through Swing, Ragtime, and countless others that thrived on regional popularity.

== Key record labels ==
- Twilight 76
- Databass
- Electrofunk
- Jefferson Ave
- Motor City Electro Company
- Intuit-Solar
- 666aline
- Dance Mania
