= Kevin Saunderson =

American DJ (born 1964)

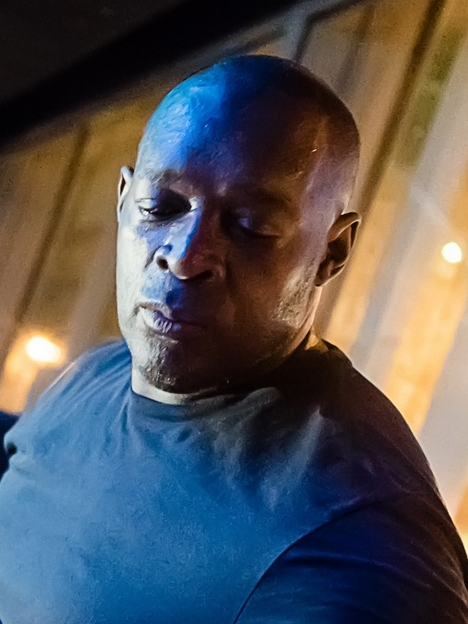
- Saunderson in 2016

Background information
- Also known as: Tronik House; Reese Project; Essaray; E-Dancer
- Born: Kevin Maurice Saunderson; September 5, 1964 (age 61)
- Origin: New York City, U.S.
- Genres: Detroit techno; house music; acid house
- Occupations: DJ, record producer
- Labels: Network Records; Giant/Warner Bros. Records

Kevin Maurice Saunderson (born September 5, 1964) is an American electronic dance music DJ and record producer. He is famous for being a member of a trio, along with Juan Atkins and Derrick May, who came to be known as The Belleville Three and is often credited to be among the pioneers and originators of techno music: in particular this act helped define Detroit techno, the earliest style of this genre. Born in New York, at the age of nine he moved to Belleville, Michigan, a suburb of Detroit, where at Belleville High School he befriended the other members of the trio.

== Early life ==
Kevin Maurice Saunderson was born on September 5, 1964, in Brooklyn, New York. He spent the early years of his life in Brooklyn before moving at around age 10 to Belleville, Michigan, a rural town 30 miles from Detroit. Saunderson first met future Techno pioneer Derrick May when the two were fourteen. May had decided not to pay Saunderson after losing a bet and, one day at school, Saunderson punched May in the face, knocking him out cold and giving him a concussion. After the altercation, the two became best friends.

During high school, Saunderson and Belleville High School classmate Juan Atkins were fans of DJ Charles "The Electrifying Mojo" Johnson. Atkins and May soon became serious about mixing others' music and creating their own, but Saunderson pursued other goals first, studying telecommunications and playing football at Eastern Michigan University. Atkins had begun recording with Cybotron in 1981, but it was not until 1987 that May followed suit and made a record. Initially concentrating on becoming a DJ, Saunderson was inspired to create his own music after watching the six-month-long process as Atkins and May completed "Let's Go."

=== Kreem ===
Atkins shared his technical expertise with Saunderson, and those early sessions led to a track called "Triangle of Love". "I used to wake up in the middle of the night, go into my studio – which was in the next room – and lay down the ideas as they came to me. At the time it was all about experimentation and being a college kid," Saunderson writes on his web page autobiography. "Triangle of Love" was released under the pseudonym Kreem on Atkins' label, Metroplex.

=== Inner City ===
Inner City is a Saunderson collaboration that came about "by accident," according to Saunderson. In 1987 he recorded a backing track in his home studio, but needed lyrics and a female vocalist. His friend, Chicago house producer Terry ‘Housemaster’ Baldwin, suggested Paris Grey. "Paris agreed, flew into Detroit, came up with lyrics and ‘Big Fun’ was born." Saunderson filed away the tape until, months later, UK dance entrepreneur Neil Rushton came to Detroit in search of music for a compilation album, Techno - The New Dance Sound Of Detroit for Virgin Records. Rushton included "Big Fun" on the album. It was soon released as a single and became a worldwide smash, only to be outsold by Inner City's follow-up single, "Good Life." A debut album, Paradise, soon followed. Over the years, and after three albums, Inner City had nine top 40 hits in the UK and two top 20 albums, with combined sales of more than six million.

=== E-Dancer ===
In the E-Dancer project Saunderson creates music that is "more underground." The first E-Dancer album, 'Heavenly,' was released in 1998 to critical acclaim; Spin named it “one of the ten best albums you’ve never heard.”

=== Later activities ===
Saunderson continued to develop his record label KMS. "The aim is to help and develop new talent and more importantly to continue to create and release great music," wrote Saunderson.

Saunderson also sponsors traveling youth baseball teams, and helps coach and manage one of those teams, the Metro Detroit Dodgers. As of 2005, his son was playing on the baseball team A Green.

On May 15, 2007, Saunderson made his Second Life debut performing live at a mixed reality event, celebrating the Grand Opening of Detroit Life - The Motor City inside The Metaverse. The same year, Saunderson compiled a mixtape for Triple J, an Australian radio station.

In November 2012, his mixing board was to be on display at the newly renovated Detroit Historical Museum.

== Artistry ==
John Bush of AllMusic assessed Saunderson's musical style: "From his very first production, Saunderson forged an energetic, groundbreaking style for techno -- a dense rhythmic assault of sound samples and heavy percussion, often with a repetitive chanted chorus forming the only vocals. His Inner City productions however, consisted of much slicker, house-inspired tracks underpinning the vocal workouts by Paris Grey -- and later, his wife Ann."

== Legacy ==
John Bush of AllMusic said that Saunderson was "easily the most dexterous in the stable of Detroit techno pioneers," calling his contributions to the genre "some of the hardest and most mechanistic techno to come out of the Motor City."

The bassline of Saunderson's 1988 track "Just Want Another Chance" (released under his "Reese" pseudonym on Incognito Records), became very influential in the jungle and drum and bass music genres. Notable releases incorporating the "Reese Bassline" include Renegade's "Terrorist" (Moving Shadow, 1994), "Pulp Friction" by Alex Reece (Metalheadz, 1995) and "Sonar" by DJ Trace (Prototype Recordings, 1998). The bassline itself was performed by a Casio CZ-1000 using phase distortion synthesis.

== Names ==
Saunderson has worked under a number of names, including the following:

- E-dancer
- Esseray
- Inner City (originally Inter City)
- Kaos
- Keynotes
- Kreem
- KS Experience
- Reese
- Reese & Santonio
- The Reese Project
- Tronikhouse
- The Elevator

== See also ==
- List of number-one dance hits (United States)
- List of artists who reached number one on the US Dance chart
