= Neil Rushton =

British journalist, DJ, record label entrepreneur, event promoter, and writer

Neil Rushton is a British journalist, DJ, record dealer, record label entrepreneur, event promoter and author who is closely associated with the Northern soul scene.

== Life and career ==
Rushton was born in Birmingham in the mid-1950s, but moved to nearby Walsall at the age of 10 and now lives in Burntwood, near Lichfield.

He developed a passion for Black American music during the late 1960s and first became involved in the Northern soul scene in the early 1970s, attending Northern soul events such as The Catacombs in Wolverhampton and the Golden Torch in Tunstall, Stoke-on-Trent.

In 1975, aged 21, Rushton promoted a Northern soul event at the Queen Mary's Ballroom in Dudley Zoo. He then went on to found the Heart of England Soul Club (HESC) and organise and promote hugely successful Northern soul and jazz-funk "all-dayers" at Tiffany's in Coalville, Leicestershire and later The Ritz in Manchester and Blackpool Mecca. The 1977 Blackpool Mecca Soul Festival was organised in conjunction with DJs Ian Levine and Colin Curtis, featured the US band Brass Construction and was attended by 3200 people. HESC events were notable for their eclectic music policy, which was designed to appeal equally to fans of the traditional Northern soul sound along with those who followed the more contemporary sounds of jazz-funk and disco. This split in the Northern soul scene was reflected in the schism between regulars at the Blackpool Mecca and Wigan Casino soul nights at the time.

Later that decade, he founded Inferno Records which specialised in the licensing and reissuing of music made popular on the Northern soul scene. Amongst Inferno Record's releases were two popular Northern soul compilation LPs, Out On The Floor Tonight and Soul Galore and a reissue of Freda Payne's "Band of Gold" on 7". The label also attained some minor success when it leased the rights for Gloria Jones' "Tainted Love" from AVI Productions in Los Angeles and reissued the original song on 7" and an extended all-nighter version on 12" vinyl format. This was in the wake of Soft Cell's 1981 UK#1 cover version and the Inferno reissue 7" sold 45,000 copies.

Later in the 1980s, Rushton managed the band the Dream Factory and founded Kool Kat Records in Birmingham in 1987, a record label which specialised in importing house music and techno from the US.

Rushton was instrumental in defining the electronic dance music genre Detroit techno in 1988 through the release of the compilation Techno! The New Dance Sound of Detroit for 10 Records in the UK, with sleeve notes by Stuart Cosgrove.

In 2001, he set up the SuSU record label, to cater for the vocal/soulful house music market in the UK, and continues to be involved in the UK dance music and Northern soul scenes as both a DJ and promoter.

In 2009, he authored and published Northern Soul Stories: Angst and Acetates, a history of the Northern soul scene from its origins in the early 1960s up to the present day.

== Publications ==
- Neil Rushton (2009). Northern Soul Stories: Angst and Acetates. Soulvation. ISBN 978-0-9564569-1-5.

== General references ==
- Neil Rushton (2009). Northern Soul Stories: Angst and Acetates. Soulvation. ISBN 978-0-9564569-1-5.
- Mark Cotgrove (2009). From Jazz Funk & Fusion to Acid Jazz: The History of the UK Jazz Dance Scene. Chaser Publications. ISBN 978-1-4389-7360-9.
- David Nowell (2001). Too Darn Soulful: The Story of Northern Soul. Robson Books. ISBN 1-86105-431-9.
