= Techno =

Genre of electronic dance music

- Stylistic origins: House; electro; synth-pop; hi-NRG; EBM; Eurodisco; Italo disco; post-disco; Chicago house; industrial; krautrock
- Cultural origins: Mid-1980s, Detroit, Michigan, U.S. Frankfurt DE
- Derivative forms: Alternative dance; trance

Subgenres
- Acid techno; Ambient techno; Birmingham sound; Bleep techno; Detroit techno; Dub techno; hardcore techno; Industrial techno; Minimal techno; Melodic techno

Fusion genres
- Afro tech; electroclash; Eurodance; gqom; ghettotech; hardvapour; IDM; kuduro; schaffel; techstep; techstyle; tech house; toytown techno

Regional scenes
- Mexico; North Brazil

Local scenes
- Detroit

Other topics
- Electronic musical instruments; computer music; list of electronic music record labels; rave; free party; teknival

Techno is a genre of electronic music which is generally produced for use in a continuous DJ set, with tempos being in the range from 120 to 150 beats per minute (bpm). The central rhythm is typically in common time (4/4) and often characterized by a repetitive four on the floor beat. Artists may use electronic instruments such as drum machines, sequencers, and synthesizers, as well as digital audio workstations. Drum machines from the 1980s such as Roland's TR-808 and TR-909 are highly prized, and software emulations of such retro instruments are popular in this style.

Much of the instrumentation in techno is used to emphasize the role of repetitive rhythm over other musical aspects. Vocals - other than short sampled snippets of voice - and complex melodies are uncommon. The use of sound synthesis in developing distinctive timbres tends to feature more prominently. Typical harmonic practices found in other forms of music are often ignored in favor of repetitive sequences of notes. More generally the creation of techno is heavily dependent on music production technology.

The term "techno" was in use in various overlapping forms to describe music in the early 1980s. Detroit musician Juan Atkins says he first used the term to refer to his own music, inspired by the writer Alvin Toffler's conception of "techno rebels", when Cybotron's "Alleys of Your Mind" was released in 1981. By 1983, Kraftwerk were using Techno Pop as the working title for the album that would eventually become 1986's Electric Café,, and the same year Yellow Magic Orchestra - who had referred to their music as "technopop" as early as 1980 - released a flexi disc EP, The Spirit of Techno. In 1984 Cybotron released the track "Techno City" which has been retrospectively acknowledged to sonically exemplify the techno genre. Also between 1982 and 1984, the word "techno" had begun to be applied to electronic music in general - covering electropop, industrial, Italo disco and EBM - in Germany and Japan. The term was, says Simon Reynolds, "bandied about" in Detroit as a description of the electronic dance sounds produced in the city through the 1980s, but then 1988, following the UK release of the compilation Techno! The New Dance Sound of Detroit, the term - or "Detroit techno" - became accepted as a genre name.

German literature on techno's origins describes it as a style that emerged in 1990 and based on Chicago house but influenced by Detroit techno, Belgian new beat and electronic body music. This version of techno became established in Europe and the United States in the early 90s. Initially, during the late 1980s in Germany, it was called 'Techno House'.

After the success of house music in Europe, techno grew in popularity in the United Kingdom, Germany, Belgium and The Netherlands. Regional variants quickly evolved and by the early 1990s techno subgenres such as acid, hardcore, bleep, ambient, and dub techno had developed. Music journalists and fans of techno are generally selective in their use of the term, so a clear distinction can be made between sometimes related but often qualitatively different styles, such as tech house and trance.

== Terminology ==
In 1977, Steve Fairnie and Bev Sage formed an electro-pop band called the Techno Twins in London, England. When Kraftwerk first toured Japan, their music was described as "technopop" by the Japanese press. The Japanese band Yellow Magic Orchestra used the word 'techno' in a number of their works such as the song "Technopolis" (1979), the album Technodelic (1981), and a flexi disc EP, "The Spirit of Techno" (1983). When Yellow Magic Orchestra toured the United States in 1980, they described their own music as technopop, and were written up in Rolling Stone Magazine. Around 1980, the members of YMO added synthesizer backing tracks to idol songs such as Ikue Sakakibara's "Robot", and these songs were classified as 'techno kayou' or 'bubblegum techno. In 1981 the Swiss news paper Nidwaldner Tagblatt categorised Yello and Grauzone as Techno-Rock. In 1985, Billboard reviewed the Canadian band Skinny Puppy's album, and described the genre as techno dance. Juan Atkins himself said "In fact, there were a lot of electronic musicians around when Cybotron started, and I think maybe half of them referred to their music as 'techno.' However, the public really wasn't ready for it until about '85 or '86. It just so happened that Detroit was there when people really got into it."

== Characteristics ==
In general, techno is very DJ-friendly, being mainly instrumental (commercial varieties being an exception) and is produced with the intention of its being heard in the context of a continuous DJ set, wherein the DJ progresses from one record to the next via a synchronized segue or "mix." Much of the instrumentation in techno emphasizes the role of rhythm over other musical parameters, but the design of synthetic timbres, and the creative use of music production technology in general, are important aspects of the overall aesthetic practice.

Unlike other forms of electronic music that tend to be produced with synthesizer keyboards, techno does not always strictly adhere to the harmonic practice of Western music and such strictures are often ignored in favor of timbral manipulation alone. The use of motivic development (though relatively limited) and the employment of conventional musical frameworks is more widely found in commercial techno styles, for example euro-trance, where the template is often an AABA song structure.

The main drum part is almost universally in common time (4/4); meaning 4 quarter note pulses per bar. In its simplest form, time is marked with kicks (bass drum beats) on each quarter-note pulse, a snare or clap on the second and fourth pulse of the bar, with an open hi-hat sound every second eighth note. This is essentially a drum pattern popularized by disco (or even polka) and is common throughout house and trance music as well. The tempo tends to vary between approximately 120 bpm (quarter note equals 120 pulses per minute) and 150 bpm, depending on the style of techno.

Some of the drum programming employed in the original Detroit-based techno made use of syncopation and polyrhythm, yet in many cases the basic disco-type pattern was used as a foundation, with polyrhythmic elaborations added using other drum machine voices. This syncopated-feel (funkiness) distinguishes the Detroit strain of techno from other variants. It is a feature that many DJs and producers still use to differentiate their music from commercial forms of techno, the majority of which tend to be devoid of syncopation. Derrick May has summed up the sound as 'Hi-tech Tribalism': something "very spiritual, very bass oriented, and very drum oriented, very percussive. The original techno music was very hi-tech with a very percussive feel... it was extremely, extremely Tribal. It feels like you're in some sort of hi-tech village."

== History ==
=== Antecedents ===
==== Proto-techno ====
The popularity of Eurodisco and Italo disco—referred to as progressive in Detroit—and new romantic synth-pop in the Detroit high school party scene from which techno emerged has prompted a number of commentators to try to redefine the origins of techno by incorporating musical precursors to the Detroit sound as part of a wider historical survey of the genre's development. The search for a mythical "first techno record" leads such commentators to consider music from long before the 1988 naming of the genre. Aside from the artists whose music was popular in the Detroit high school scene ("progressive" disco acts such as Giorgio Moroder, Alexander Robotnick, and Claudio Simonetti synth-pop artists such as Visage, New Order, Depeche Mode, The Human League, and Heaven 17), they point to examples such as "Sharevari" (1981) by A Number of Names, danceable selections from Kraftwerk (1977–83), the earliest compositions by Cybotron (1981), Moroder's "From Here to Eternity" (1977), and Manuel Göttsching's "proto-techno masterpiece" E2-E4 (1981). The Eurodisco song I Feel Love, produced by Giorgio Moroder for Donna Summer in Munich in 1976, has been described as a milestone and blueprint for techno and house because it was the first to combine repetitive synthesizer loops with a continuous four-on-the-floor bass drum and an off-beat hi-hat, which would become a main feature of techno and house ten years later. Another example is a record entitled Love in C minor, released in 1976 by Parisian Eurodisco producer Jean-Marc Cerrone; cited as the first so called "conceptual disco" production and the record from which house, techno, and other underground dance music styles flowed. Yet another example is Yellow Magic Orchestra's work which has been described as "proto-techno"

Around 1983, Sheffield band Cabaret Voltaire began including funk and EDM elements into their sound, and in later years, would come to be described as techno. Nitzer Ebb was an Essex band formed in 1982, which also showed funk and EDM influence on their sound around this time. The Danish band Laid Back released "White Horse" in 1983 with a similar funky electronica sound.

==== Prehistory ====
Some electro-disco and European synth-pop productions share with techno a dependence on machine-generated dance rhythms, but such comparisons are not without contention. Efforts to regress further into the past, in search of earlier antecedents, entails a further regression, to the sequenced electronic music of Raymond Scott, whose "The Rhythm Modulator," "The Bass-Line Generator," and "IBM Probe" are considered early examples of techno-like music. In a review of Scott's Manhattan Research Inc. compilation album the English newspaper The Independent suggested that "Scott's importance lies mainly in his realization of the rhythmic possibilities of electronic music, which laid the foundation for all electro-pop from disco to techno." In 2008, a tape from the mid-to-late 1960s by the original composer of the Doctor Who theme Delia Derbyshire, was found to contain music that sounded remarkably like contemporary EDM. Commenting on the tape, Paul Hartnoll, of the dance group Orbital, described the example as "quite amazing," noting that it sounded not unlike something that "could be coming out next week on Warp Records."

=== Detroit ===
Techno emerged in and around Detroit in the first half of the 1980s. Juan Atkins, Derrick May and Kevin Saunderson (collectively known as The Belleville Three), along with Eddie Fowlkes, Blake Baxter, James Pennington and others, are viewed as its first wave. They were inspired by science fiction and futurology, and found common ground between the synthesisers of Kraftwerk, Giorgio Moroder and Yellow Magic Orchestra and the African American traditions of disco and funk, heard together on the radio shows of The Electrifying Mojo. Writer Kodwo Eshun maintains that "Kraftwerk are to techno what Muddy Waters is to the Rolling Stones: the authentic, the origin, the real."

Atkins and Richard Davis's Cybotron used the word techno in the early 1980s, and in 1985 Atkins founded the Metroplex label and released Model 500's "No UFO's", generally considered the first techno production. The Detroit producers were closely connected to the Chicago house scene, and May's "Strings of Life" (1987) is considered a classic of both house and techno. Rejecting the traditional formulas of Motown and R&B, they described their music as a "post-soul" sound; May called it "like George Clinton and Kraftwerk are stuck in an elevator with only a sequencer to keep them company."

The mid-1988 UK release of Techno! The New Dance Sound of Detroit, compiled by Neil Rushton and May, introduced the word techno to British audiences and established it as a genre distinct from Chicago house. In Detroit the Music Institute club (1988–1989) gave the scene a focal point. A second wave of Detroit artists emerged from around 1990, including Carl Craig, Underground Resistance (Mike Banks, Jeff Mills and Robert Hood), Kenny Larkin, Stacey Pullen, K-Hand and Octave One, alongside Richie Hawtin and John Acquaviva's Plus 8 label across the river in Windsor. These artists worked in continuous exchange with European scenes, recording for labels such as Tresor in Berlin, R&S in Belgium and Warp in Sheffield.

=== Spread to Europe, 1988–1995 ===
As the techno sound evolved in the late 1980s and early 1990s, it also diverged to such an extent that a wide spectrum of stylistically distinct music was being referred to as techno. This ranged from relatively pop oriented acts such as Moby to the distinctly anti-commercial sentiments of Underground Resistance. Derrick May's experimentation on works such as Beyond the Dance (1989) and The Beginning (1990) were credited with taking techno "in dozens of new directions at once and having the kind of expansive impact John Coltrane had on Jazz". The Birmingham-based label Network Records label was instrumental in introducing Detroit techno to British audiences. By the early 1990s, the original techno sound had garnered a large underground following in the United Kingdom, Germany, the Netherlands and Belgium. The growth of techno's popularity in Europe between 1988 and 1992 was largely due to the emergence of the rave scene and a thriving club culture.

==== Germany ====
In Frankfurt, DJ Talla 2XLC used techno from 1982 for electronic body music and synth-pop, and his Technoclub night (from 1984) became a hub for the regional scene. At the end of the 1980s the word was transferred to the house-derived music arriving from Chicago and Detroit, and the older "Frankfurt" definition gave way to the newer "Berlin" one.

The first Love Parade took place in West Berlin in July 1989, just a few months before the fall of the Berlin Wall in November of the same year. In the early 1990s, clubs such as Tresor opened in empty buildings in the former East of the city, and techno became closely associated with reunification. Techno clubs emerged throughout Germany, and techno became a mass phenomenon, with up to two million young people regularly attending techno events in the mid-1990s. By 1999, the Love Parade had grown to an event attracting a reported 1.5 million people. Tresor's ties with Detroit, celebrated on the 1993 compilation Tresor II: Berlin & Detroit – A Techno Alliance, made Berlin a second centre for the music. Frankfurt's Omen club, Sven Väth and the Eye Q and Harthouse labels shaped early trance. Berlin's Basic Channel pioneered dub techno, Cologne's Kompakt and Wolfgang Voigt shaped minimal techno, and Frankfurt's Chris Liebing coined the name Schranz for a hard, loop-based style. In 1996, Munich's DJ Hell founded International DeeJay Gigolo Records, which mixed techno with 80's pop and disco influences and became the germ cell of the electroclash music genre. In the 2000s Berlin became a centre for minimal techno and, through Berghain, for a slower, heavier techno sound; in 2024 the city's techno culture was added to Germany's inventory of intangible cultural heritage.

==== Belgium and the Netherlands ====
Belgium became another centre of techno in Europe. From 1988 onwards, the Ghent-based label R&S Records embraced harder-edged techno by young producers such as Beltram and C.J. Bolland, characterized by "tough, metallic tracks...with harsh, discordant synth lines that sounded like distressed Hoovers," according to one music journalist.

==== United Kingdom ====
A club following for house music grew in the UK from 1985, and by 1988 the acid house boom had produced the first mass "raves". Detroit techno was initially supported by a handful of house clubs in northern England, with London catching up later; DJ Mark Moore recalled that May's "Strings of Life" helped win London club-goers over to house in 1987. Many of the first British techno producers came to the music through electro and hip hop, or from the post-punk, industrial and gay club scenes. In London, the Kiss FM DJs Colin Faver and Colin Dale and parties such as Lost and Knowledge championed the Detroit sound, while producers including The Black Dog, B12, Kirk Degiorgio and Luke Slater developed their own versions of it. From 1992, Warp's Artificial Intelligence series helped define "intelligent techno", a listening-oriented style that distanced itself from rave and fed into what became intelligent dance music.

At the same time, travelling sound systems such as Spiral Tribe built a free party circuit that culminated in the Castlemorton Common Festival in 1992; after the Criminal Justice and Public Order Act 1994, many of them took the free party model to continental Europe, while in London the squat party scene developed acid techno. In 1991, Glasgow-based label Soma Records was founded by Slam and others, becoming a platform for Scottish techno.

=== North America in the 1990s ===
In the United States during the early 90s, apart from regional scenes in Detroit, New York City, Chicago and Orlando, interest in techno was limited. Many Detroit based producers, frustrated by the lack of opportunity in the US, looked to Europe for a future livelihood. This first wave of Detroit expatriates was soon joined by a so-called "second wave" that included Carl Craig, Octave One, Jay Denham, Kenny Larkin, Stacey Pullen, and UR's Jeff Mills, Mike Banks, and Robert Hood. In the same period, close to Detroit (Windsor, Ontario), Richie Hawtin, with business partner John Acquaviva, launched the techno imprint Plus 8 Records. A number of New York producers also made an impression in Europe at this time, most notably Frankie Bones, Lenny Dee, and Joey Beltram.

=== Stylistic developments in the 1990s ===
==== Minimal techno ====
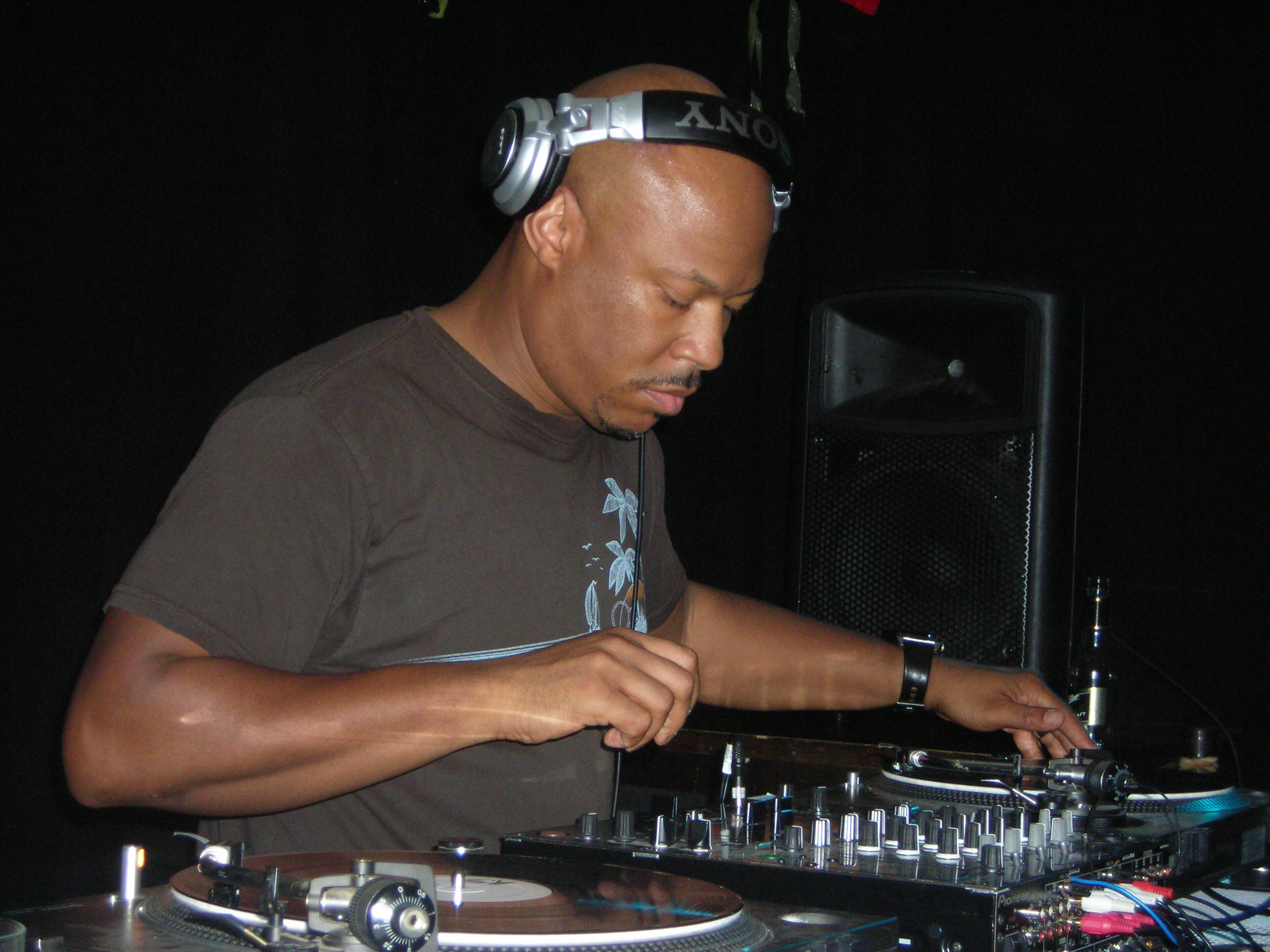
Robert Hood, techno minimalist, in 2009

As techno continued to transmute a number of Detroit producers began to question the trajectory the music was taking. One response came in the form of so-called minimal techno (a term producer Daniel Bell found difficult to accept, finding the term minimalism, in the artistic sense of the word, too "arty"). It is thought that Robert Hood, a Detroit-based producer and one time member of UR, is largely responsible for ushering in the minimal strain of techno. Hood describes the situation in the early 1990s as one where techno had become too "ravey", with increasing tempos, the emergence of gabber, and related trends straying far from the social commentary and soul-infused sound of original Detroit techno. In response, Hood and others sought to emphasize a single element of the Detroit aesthetic, interpreting techno with "a basic stripped down, raw sound. Just drums, basslines and funky grooves and only what's essential. Only what is essential to make people move". Hood explains:

I think Dan [Bell] and I both realized that something was missing – an element ... in what we both know as techno. It sounded great from a production point of standpoint, but there was a 'jack' element in the [old] structure. People would complain that there's no funk, no feeling in techno anymore, and the easy escape is to put a vocalist and some piano on top to fill the emotional gap. I thought it was time for a return to the original underground.

==== Jazz influences ====
Some techno has also been influenced by or directly infused with elements of jazz. This led to increased sophistication in the use of both rhythm and harmony in a number of techno productions. Manchester (UK)-based techno act 808 State helped fuel this development with tracks such as "Pacific State" and "Cobra Bora" in 1989. Detroit producer Mike Banks was heavily influenced by jazz, as demonstrated on the influential Underground Resistance release Nation 2 Nation (1991). By 1993, Detroit acts such as Model 500 and UR had made explicit references to the genre, with the tracks "Jazz Is The Teacher" (1993) and "Hi-Tech Jazz" (1993), the latter being part of a larger body of work and group called Galaxy 2 Galaxy, a self-described jazz project based on Kraftwerk's "man machine" doctrine. This lead was followed by a number of techno producers in the UK who were influenced by both jazz and UR, Dave Angel's "Seas of Tranquility" EP (1994) being a case in point, Other notable artists who set about expanding upon the structure of "classic techno" include Dan Curtin, Morgan Geist, Titonton Duvante and Ian O'Brien.

=== Divergence ===
By 1994 there were a number of techno producers in the UK and Europe building on the Detroit sound, but a number of other underground dance music styles were by then vying for attention. Some drew upon the Detroit techno aesthetic, while others fused components of preceding dance music forms. This led to the appearance (in the UK initially) of inventive new music that sounded far-removed from techno. For instance jungle (drum and bass) demonstrated influences ranging from hip hop, soul, and reggae to techno and house.

By the end of the 1990s, a number of post-techno underground styles had emerged, including ghettotech (a style that combines some of the aesthetics of techno with hip-hop and house music), nortec, glitch, digital hardcore, electroclash and so-called no-beat techno.

In attempting to sum up the changes since the heyday of Detroit techno, Derrick May has since revised his famous quote in stating that "Kraftwerk got off on the third floor and now George Clinton's got Napalm Death in there with him. The elevator's stalled between the pharmacy and the athletic wear store."

== Production ==
=== Compositional techniques ===
There are many ways to create techno, but the majority will depend upon the use of loop-based step sequencing as a compositional method. Techno musicians, or producers, rather than employing traditional compositional techniques, may work in an improvisatory fashion, often treating the electronic music studio as one large instrument. The collection of devices found in a typical studio will include units that are capable of producing many different sounds and effects. Studio production equipment is generally synchronized using a hardware- or computer-based MIDI sequencer, enabling the producer to combine in one arrangement the sequenced output of many devices. A typical approach to using this type of technology compositionally is to overdub successive layers of material while continuously looping a single measure or sequence of measures. This process will usually continue until a suitable multi-track arrangement has been produced.

Once a single loop-based arrangement has been generated, a producer may then focus on developing how the summing of the overdubbed parts will unfold in time, and what the final structure of the piece will be. Some producers achieve this by adding or removing layers of material at appropriate points in the mix. Quite often, this is achieved by physically manipulating a mixer, sequencer, effects, dynamic processing, equalization, and filtering while recording to a multi-track device. Other producers achieve similar results by using the automation features of computer-based digital audio workstations. Techno can consist of little more than cleverly programmed rhythmic sequences and looped motifs combined with signal processing of one variety or another, frequency filtering being a commonly used process. A more idiosyncratic approach to production is evident in the music of artists such as Twerk and Autechre, where aspects of algorithmic composition are employed in the generation of material.

=== Retro technology ===
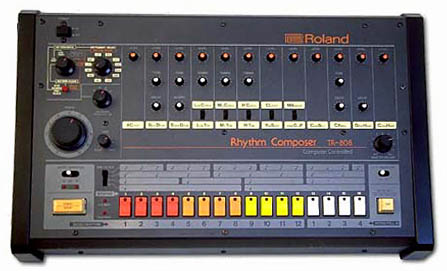
The Roland TR-808 was, according to Derrick May, the preferred drum machine during the early years of techno.

Instruments used by the original techno producers based in Detroit, many of which are highly sought after on the retro music technology market, include classic drum machines like the Roland TR-808 and TR-909, devices such as the Roland TB-303 bass line generator, and synthesizers such as the Roland SH-101, Kawai KC10, Yamaha DX7, and Yamaha DX100 (as heard on Derrick May's seminal 1987 techno release Nude Photo). Much of the early music sequencing was executed via MIDI (but neither the TR-808 nor the TB-303 had MIDI, only DIN sync) using hardware sequencers such as the Korg SQD1 and Roland MC-50, and the limited amount of sampling that was featured in this early style was accomplished using an Akai S900.

By the mid-1990s TR-808 and TR-909 drum machines had already achieved legendary status, a fact reflected in the prices sought for used devices. During the 1980s, the 808 became the staple beat machine in Hip hop production while the 909 found its home in House music and techno. It was "the pioneers of Detroit techno [who] were making the 909 the rhythmic basis of their sound, and setting the stage for the rise of Roland's vintage Rhythm Composer." In November 1995 the UK music technology magazine Sound on Sound noted:

There can be few hi-tech instruments which still command a second-hand price only slightly lower than their original selling price 10 years after their launch. Roland's now near-legendary TR-909 is such an example—released in 1984 with a retail price of £999, they now fetch up to £900 on the second-hand market! The irony of the situation is that barely a year after its launch, the 909 was being 'chopped out' by hi-tech dealers for around £375, to make way for the then-new TR-707 and TR-727. Prices hit a new low around 1988, when you could often pick up a second-user 909 for under £200—and occasionally even under £100. Musicians all over the country are now garrotting themselves with MIDI leads as they remember that 909 they sneered at for £100—or worse, the one they sold for £50 (did you ever hear the one about the guy who gave away his TB-303 Bassline—now worth anything up to £900 from true loony collectors—because he couldn't sell it?)

By May 1996, Sound on Sound was reporting that the popularity of the 808 had started to decline, with the rarer TR-909 taking its place as "the dance floor drum machine to use." This is thought to have arisen for a number of reasons: the 909 gives more control over the drum sounds, has better programming and includes MIDI as standard. Sound on Sound reported that the 909 was selling for between £900 and £1100 and noted that the 808 was still collectible, but maximum prices had peaked at about £700 to £800. Despite this fascination with retro music technology, according to Derrick May "there is no recipe, there is no keyboard or drum machine which makes the best techno, or whatever you want to call it. There never has been. It was down to the preferences of a few guys. The 808 was our preference. We were using Yamaha drum machines, different percussion machines, whatever."

==== Emulation ====
In the latter half of the 1990s the demand for vintage drum machines and synthesizers motivated a number of software companies to produce computer-based emulators. One of the most notable was the ReBirth RB-338, produced by the Swedish company Propellerhead and originally released in May 1997. Version one of the software featured two TB-303s and a TR-808 only, but the release of version two saw the inclusion of a TR-909. A Sound on Sound review of the RB-338 V2 in November 1998 noted that Rebirth had been called "the ultimate techno software package" and mentions that it was "a considerable software success story of 1997". In America Keyboard Magazine asserted that ReBirth had "opened up a whole new paradigm: modeled analog synthesizer tones, percussion synthesis, pattern-based sequencing, all integrated in one piece of software". Despite the success of ReBirth RB-338, it was officially taken out of production in September 2005. Propellerhead then made it freely available for download from a website called the "ReBirth Museum". The site also features extensive information about the software's history and development.

In 2001, Propellerhead released Reason V1, a software-based electronic music studio, comprising a 14-input automated digital mixer, 99-note polyphonic 'analogue' synth, classic Roland-style drum machine, sample-playback unit, analogue-style step sequencer, loop player, multitrack sequencer, eight effects processors, and over 500 MB of synthesizer patches and samples. With this release Propellerhead were credited with "creating a buzz that only happens when a product has really tapped into the zeitgeist, and may just be the one that many [were] waiting for." Reason is as of 2018 at version 10.

=== Technological advances ===
During the mid-to-late 1990s, as computer technology became more accessible and music software advanced, interacting with music production technology was possible using means that bore little relationship to traditional musical performance practices: for instance, laptop performance (laptronica) and live coding. By the mid-2000s a number of software-based virtual studio environments had emerged, with products such as Propellerhead's Reason and Ableton Live finding popular appeal. Also during this period software versions of classic devices, that once existed exclusively in the hardware domain, became available for the first time. These software-based music production tools offered viable and cost-effective alternatives to typical hardware-based production studios, and thanks to continued advances in microprocessor technology, it became possible to create high quality music using little more than a single laptop computer. Using highly configurable software tools artists could also easily tailor their production sound by creating personalized software synthesizers, effects modules, and various composition environments. Some of the more popular programs for achieving such ends included commercial releases such as Max/Msp and Reaktor and freeware packages such as Pure Data, SuperCollider, and ChucK. In a certain sense this technological innovation lead to the resurgence of the DIY mentality that was once central to dance music culture. In the 00s these advances democratized music creation and lead to a significant increase in the amount of home-produced music available to the general public via the internet.

== Cultural impact ==
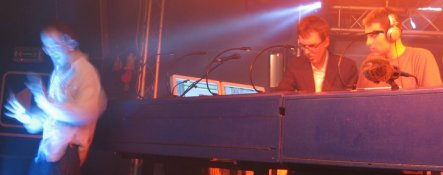
Underworld during a live performance

While techno and its derivatives only occasionally produce commercially successful mainstream acts—Underworld and Orbital being two better-known examples—the genre has significantly affected many other areas of music.

Rapper Missy Elliott exposed the popular music audience to the Detroit techno sound when she featured material from Cybotron's Clear on her 2005 release "Lose Control"; this resulted in Juan Atkins' receiving a Grammy Award nomination for his writing credit. Elliott's 2001 album Miss E... So Addictive also clearly demonstrated the influence of techno inspired club culture.

In the late 90s the publication of relatively accurate histories by authors Simon Reynolds (Generation Ecstasy, also known as Energy Flash) and Dan Sicko (Techno Rebels), plus mainstream press coverage of the Detroit Electronic Music Festival in the 2000s, helped diffuse some of the genre's more dubious mythology. Even the Detroit-based company Ford Motors eventually became savvy to the mass appeal of techno, noting that "this music was created partly by the pounding clangor of the Motor City's auto factories. It became natural for us to incorporate Detroit techno into our commercials after we discovered that young people are embracing techno." With a marketing campaign targeting under-35s, Ford used "Detroit Techno" as a print ad slogan and chose Model 500's "No UFO's" to underpin its November 2000 MTV television advertisement for the Ford Focus.

== Notable techno venues ==
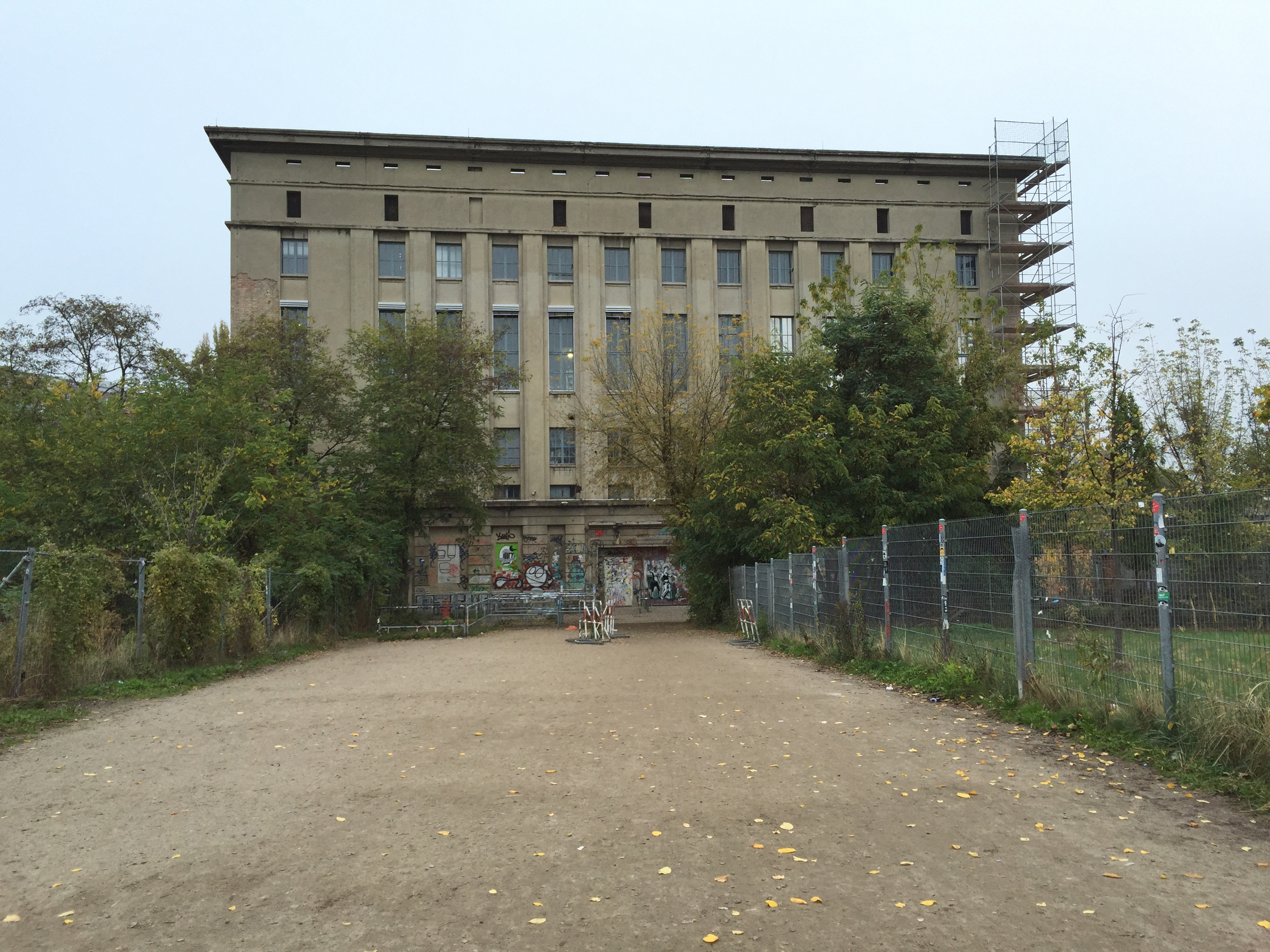
Berlin's Berghain techno club

In Germany, noted techno clubs of the 1990s include Tresor and E-Werk in Berlin, Omen and Dorian Gray in Frankfurt, Ultraschall and KW – Das Heizkraftwerk in Munich as well as Stammheim in Kassel. In 2007, Berghain was cited as "possibly the current world capital of techno, much as E-Werk or Tresor were in their respective heydays". In the 2010s, aside from Berlin, Germany continued to have a thriving techno scene with clubs such as Gewölbe in Cologne, Institut für Zukunft in Leipzig, MMA Club and Blitz Club in Munich, Die Rakete in Nuremberg and Robert Johnson in Offenbach am Main.

In the United Kingdom, Glasgow's Sub Club has been associated with techno since the early 1990s. Despite a reported decline in dedicated UK techno nights by the mid-1990s, clubs such as The Orbit in Leeds, House of God in Birmingham, Pure in Edinburgh, as well as Shine in Belfast, also developed strong techno scenes. Since the late 1990s, clubs such as London's Fabric and Egg London have gained notoriety for supporting techno.

In the 2010s, a techno scene also emerged in Georgia, with the Bassiani in Tbilisi being the most notable venue.

In the United States, techno originated in Detroit in the mid-1980s, and the short-lived Music Institute, open from May 1988 to November 1989, became an early proving ground for DJs including Derrick May, Juan Atkins and Kevin Saunderson, helping cement the city's reputation as the genre's birthplace.

In the Netherlands, Amsterdam's Trouw, housed in a former newspaper printing works, operated from 2009 to 2015 and was ranked among the world's best clubs by DJ Mag readers before closing so the building could be redeveloped; the same team subsequently opened De School in 2016.

In Spain, Florida 135 in Fraga, known as La Catedral del Techno ("The Cathedral of Techno") since its 1985 redesign, has operated continuously since 1942 and hosted DJs such as Laurent Garnier and Richie Hawtin, making it one of the oldest still-operating nightclubs in the country.

== See also ==
- Detroit Electronic Music Archive

== Bibliography ==
- Anz, P.; Walder, P., eds. (1995). Techno (in German). Zürich: Verlag Ricco Bilger. ISBN 3908010144. Also published by Rowohlt Taschenbuch Verlag, 1999 (ISBN 3499608170).
- Barr, T. (2000). Techno: The Rough Guide. Rough Guides. ISBN 978-1858284347.
- Brewster, B.; Broughton, F. (2006). Last Night a DJ Saved My Life: The History of the Disc Jockey. Avalon Travel Publishing. ISBN 978-0802136886.
- Butler, M. J. (2006). Unlocking the Groove: Rhythm, Meter, and Musical Design in Electronic Dance Music. Indiana University Press. ISBN 978-0253218049.
- Cannon, S.; Dauncey, H. (2003). Popular Music in France from Chanson to Techno: Culture, Identity and Society. Ashgate. ISBN 978-0754608493.
- Collin, M. (1998). Altered State: The Story of Ecstasy Culture and Acid House. Serpent's Tail. ISBN 978-1852426040.
- Cosgrove, S. (May 1988). "Seventh City Techno". The Face. No. 97. p. 88. ISSN 0263-1210.
- Cosgrove, S. (1988). Techno! The New Dance Sound of Detroit (Media notes). 10 Records. LP: DIXG 75; CD: DIXCD 75. Archived from the original on 4 May 2008.
- Cox, C.; Warner, D., eds. (2004). Audio Culture: Readings in Modern Music. Continuum. ISBN 978-0826416155.
- Emmerson, S. (2007). Living Electronic Music. Aldershot: Ashgate.
- Eshun, Kodwo (1998). More Brilliant Than the Sun: Adventures in Sonic Fiction. Quartet Books. ISBN 978-0704380257.
- Fritz, J. (2000). Rave Culture: An Insider's Overview. Smallfry Press. ISBN 978-0968572108.
- Nelson, A.; Tu, L. T. N.; Headlam Hines, A., eds. (2001). TechniColor: Race, Technology and Everyday Life. New York University Press. ISBN 978-0814736043.
- Nye, S "Minimal Understandings: The Berlin Decade, The Minimal Continuum, and Debates on the Legacy of German Techno," Archived 2015-01-01 at the Wayback Machine in Journal of Popular Music Studies 25, no. 2(2013): 154–84.
- Pesch, M. (1998). Weisbeck, M. (ed.). Techno Style: The Album Cover Art. Edition Olms. ISBN 978-3283002909.
- Rietveld, H. C. (1998). This is Our House: House Music, Cultural Spaces and Technologies. Aldershot: Ashgate. ISBN 978-1857422429.
- Reynolds, S. (1998). Energy Flash: a Journey Through Rave Music and Dance Culture. Pan Macmillan. ISBN 978-0330350563.
- Reynolds, S. (1999). Generation Ecstasy: Into the World of Techno and Rave Culture. New York: Routledge. ISBN 978-0415923736. Reissued by Soft Skull Press, 2012 (ISBN 978-1593764074). (Note: Generation Ecstasy is based on Energy Flash, but is a unique edition significantly rewritten for the North American market. Its copyright date is 1998, but it was first published July 1999.)
- Reynolds, S. (2013). Energy Flash: a Journey Through Rave Music and Dance Culture. Faber and Faber. ISBN 978-0571289134. (Note: This 2013 edition is expanded to include coverage of dubstep and the EDM boom in North America.)
- Savage, J. (1992). The Hacienda Must Be Built. International Music Publications. ISBN 978-0863598579.
- Sicko, D. (1999). Techno Rebels: The Renegades of Electronic Funk. Billboard Books. ISBN 978-0823084289.
- Sicko, D. (2010). Techno Rebels: The Renegades of Electronic Funk (2nd ed.). Wayne State University Press. ISBN 978-0814334386.
- St John, G., ed. (2001). FreeNRG: Notes From the Edge of the Dance Floor. Melbourne: Common Ground. ISBN 978-1863350846.
- St John, G., ed. (2004). Rave Culture and Religion. New York: Routledge. ISBN 978-0415314497. Archived from the original on 19 December 2018.
- St John, G. (2009). Technomad: Global Raving Countercultures. London: Equinox. ISBN 978-1-84553-626-8. Archived from the original on 19 December 2018.
- Toop, D. (2001). Ocean of Sound (new ed.). Serpent's Tail. ISBN 978-1852427436.
- Watten, B. (2003). The Constructivist Moment: From Material Text to Cultural Poetics. Wesleyan University Press. ISBN 978-0819566102.

== Filmography ==
- High Tech Soul Archived 2013-12-08 at the Wayback Machine – Catalog No.: PLX-029; Label: Plexifilm; Released: 19 September 2006; Director: Gary Bredow; Length: 64 minutes.
- Paris/Berlin: 20 Years Of Underground Techno Archived 2016-06-23 at the Wayback Machine – Label: Les Films du Garage; Released: 2012; Director: Amélie Ravalec; Length: 52 minutes.
- We Call It Techno! Archived 2015-01-25 at the Wayback Machine – A documentary about Germany's early Techno scene and culture – Label: Sense Music & Media, Berlin, DE; Released: June 2008; Directors: Maren Sextro & Holger Wick.
- Tresor Berlin: The Vault and the Electronic Frontier – Label: Pyramids of London Films; Released 2004; Director: Michael Andrawis; Length: 62 minutes
- Technomania Archived 2016-01-28 at the Wayback Machine – Released: 1996 (screened at NowHere, an exhibition held at Louisiana Museum of Modern Art, Denmark, between 15 May and 8 September 1996); Director: Franz A. Pandal; Length: 52 minutes.
- Universal Techno on YouTube – Label: Les Films à Lou; Released: 1996; Director: Dominique Deluze; Length: 63 minutes.
