= Metroplex (record label) =

American techno music label

- Founded: 1985
- Founder: Juan Atkins
- Distributor: Elypsia Music Group
- Genre: Techno
- Country of origin: United States
- Location: Detroit, Michigan
- Official website: metroplexrecords.bandcamp.com

Metroplex is an American techno record label in Detroit, Michigan, United States, founded in 1985 by techno pioneer Juan Atkins. Juan Atkins did most of his work for the label under the pseudonyms Model 500 and Infiniti, and will occasionally use such names for live acts.

== Discography ==
- M-001 Model 500 - "No UFO's" / "Future" (1985)
- M-002 Model 500 - "Night Drive (through Babylon)" (1985)
- M-003 Channel One - "Technicolor" (1986)
- M-004 Model 500 - "Play It Cool" (1986)
- M-005 Model 500 - "Testing 1-2" / "Bang the Beat" (1986)
- M-006 Eddie "Flashin" Fowlkes - "Goodbye Kiss" (1986)
- M-007 Kreem - "Triangle of Love" (1986)
- M-008 Model 500 - "Make Some Noise" (1987)
- M-009 Triple XXX - "The Bedroom Scene" (1987)
- M-010 Flintstones - "Party Race" (1987)
- M-011 Model 500 - "Sound of Stereo" / "Off to Battle" (1987)
- M-012 Model 500 - "Interference" / "Electronic" (1988)
- M-014 Model 500 - "The Chase" (1989)
- M-015 J. Anderson & K. Tucker - "Frequency" (1990)
- M-015-2 Model 600 - "Update" (2002)
- M-016 Rona Johnson - "By Your Side" (1990)
- M-017 DJ Reckless Ron - "Here's Your Chance Now Dance" (1990)
- M-018 Beyond All Praise - "Hooked on the Hype" (1990)
- M-019 Anthony Shakir - "The 5% Solution" (1993)
- M-020 M500 & 3 Mb - "Jazz in the Teacher" (1993)
- M-021 Model 500 "I See the Light" / "Pick Up the Flow" (1993)
- M-022 Infiniti - "Game One" / "Think Quick" (1994)
- M-023 Audiotech - "Phase Two" (1995)
- M-024 Model 500 - "Starlight" (1995)
- M-025 The Vision - "Spectral Nomad" (1996)
- M-026 Population One - "Two Sides to Every Story" (1996)
- M-027 Low Res - "Amuk" (1996)
- M-028 Black Noise - "Nature of the Beast" (1997)
- M-029 Population One - "Earth 2976" (1997)
- M-030 Erik Travis - "The Other Side of Space" (1998)
- M-031 Diverse artiesten - "Lock It Down" / "I Shall Tek Thee" (1999)
- M-031R X-Ray - "Lock It Down" (2002)
- M-032 Marc Floyd - "Chaos" (1999)
- M-033 Re-Test - "Re-Test" (1999)
- M-034 Gerald Mitchell - "Celestial Highways" (1999)
- M-035 Aaron Carl - "Down" (1999)
- M-036X2 DJ Bone - "Riding the Thin Line" (1999)
- M-037 Mark Taylor - "Silicon Alley" (1999)
- M-038 Model 500 - "Outer Space" (2004)
- MCD-01 Various artists - Timeless (2002 CD)
- M-039 Kimyon - "Platform View" (2011)
- M-040 Audio Tech - "Dark Side" (2013)
- M-041 Population One - "A Mind of His Own" (2014)
- M-042 Plural - "Shifting Forward" (2015)
- M-043 Arnold Steiner - "Mood Sequence" (2016)
- M-044 Kimyon - "Pema Ozer" (2016)

== See also ==
- List of record labels
