= Blake Baxter =

American musician

- Born: 1963 (age 62–63); Detroit, MI, US
- Genres: Dance; Techno
- Years active: 1987–present
- Labels: KMS Records; Virgin 10 Records; Incognito Records; Underground Resistance Records; Tresor Records; Logic Records; Disko B

Blake Baxter (born 1963) is an American techno musician, associated with the first wave of Detroit techno. AllMusic called him "perhaps the most underrated figure" of the early Detroit techno scene. He has also been described as a "unsung hero" of Detroit techno music. Additionally, his production in his production work, Baxter has been recognized for helping bridging the gap between Chicago house and Detroit techno music. This contributed to the evolution of dance music in the late 1980s into the early 1990s.

== Early Life and Influences ==
Baxter was born in Detroit, Michigan, United States, and first began mixing records in the middle of the 1980s. His early influences gave him exposure to the city's electronic music scene which later went on to influence his production style. Specifically, the elements of mixing Chicago house music with Detroit's techno is what gave him a distinguished sound. He has cited the great importance the experimenting with different genres had on his career. Baxter has said that his allowed him to develop a more versatile approach to producing Music compared to his contemporaries.

== Career Start ==
Some of his first releases were recorded in Chicago on the label DJ International, which was later remixed and released in Detroit on the record label KMS Records, KMS-011, also in Detroit. These early releases helped establish his presences within both the Chicago and Detroit music and dance scenes. He released music on the Underground Resistance label, including an EP 12-inch vinyl The Prince of Techno UR-06 in the late 1980s and early 1990s. He also had several of his productions featured on the Techno! The New Dance Sound of Detroit compilation, which played a major role in introducing techno artist, including Baxter, to the international stage His inclusion on the international stage led to him being positioned alongside foundational people in the genre during a time of rapid, fast, growth.Around 1989-92, he released three 12-inch records on Incognito Records.

== International Work and European Influence ==
While touring in Germany in Berlin, he released One More Time on Tresor Records and Brothers Gonna Work it Out on Logic Records in Frankfurt; a track based on Willie Hutch's 1973 eponymous release, which was later sampled by The Chemical Brothers. His time in Germany marked a created a strong following in Europe, specifically in Berlin. This helped establish the city as a major hub for electric music. During this time, Baxter became closely thought of as growing with the European scene. This was a scene that Detroit artists were getting bigger and bigger as they were being accepted by club audiences and record labels.

== Later Career ==
After returning to Detroit, he set up the labels Mix Records and Phat Joint and opened a record store in downtown Detroit called Save the Vinyl from 1992 to 1999. Baxter's work is admired for its mesh of funk influences and his lyrical themes. These attributes distinguished his production from his peers within the Detroit techno music scene. Baxter's use of vocal elements, as well as using narrative driven tracks is what set him apart from the many instrumental tracks that were coming out at the same time as his music was. He has also been featured in discussions and documentary projects about the origins of techno, which include being highlighted by Resident Advisory and the Tribeca Film Festival, which he is set to speak at in the Spring of 2026. These appearances reflect his broader work and his contributions to the genre In later year, Baxter has been active through DJ performances and being featured on podcasts that explain his career and influence. He has also been a part of interviews and long-form discussions that look back on Detroit's techno past, specifically highlighting the work of early pioneers in the field.

== Discography ==
- Work Jack Master 2 compilation album DJ International Westside Records
- In This House We Jack Jack Master 4 compilation album DJ International Westside Records
- When We Used to Play EP KMS Records, 1987
- "Forever and a day", Techno! The New Dance Sound of Detroit album compilation (Virgin 10 Records), 1988
- "Ride em Boy", Techno! The New Dance Sound of Detroit album compilation (Virgin 10 Records), 1988
- Sexuality Incognito Records, 1989
- The Crimes of the Heart EP Incognito Records, 1990
- The Prince of Techno EP Underground Resistance Records, 1991
- One More Time Tresor Records, 1992
- Brothers Gonna Work it Out Logic Records, 1993
- The Vault (Disko B, 1995)
- The H Factor (Hurricane Melt) (Disko B, 1997)
- A Decade Underground DJ Mix (Tresor Records, 1998)
- Dream Sequence (Tresor, 2000)
- Dream Sequence 3 (Tresor, 2001)
