= The Electrifying Mojo =

American radio personality

The Electrifying Mojo (born Charles Johnson in Little Rock, Arkansas) is an American radio personality. He is a disc jockey based in Detroit, Michigan whose on-air journey of musical and social development shaped a generation of music-lovers in Detroit and throughout southeastern Michigan, Toledo, Ohio and Canada and was of importance to the development of Detroit techno.

He is recognized for having introduced many artists into the Detroit radio market, including Prince, Parliament-Funkadelic, The B-52's, and Kraftwerk, and was occasionally thanked on-air by the artists for his support of their work. Prince granted Mojo a telephone interview following a sold out birthday concert at Cobo Arena on June 7, 1986, during an era when Prince rarely if ever granted interviews. He was visited in the studio by The B-52's and The J. Geils Band with the latter thanking him for playing "Flamethrower" from their album Freeze Frame.

== History ==
Mojo's seminal radio show ran from 1977 through the mid-1980s, and while broadcast on stations marketed toward the African-American market, his programming was a combination of soul, funk, new wave, hip hop, and rock. He also wrote music, sometimes under the name "C. J. Surge".

Johnson's first radio job was at KOKY in Little Rock, Arkansas. He next worked at DYZA in the Philippines, then returned to KOKY and later moved to KALO in Little Rock. After serving in the Air Force, Johnson attended the University of Michigan in the mid-1970s where he began broadcasting on the university radio station and then on Ann Arbor station WAAM (at the time a popular Top 40 station). In 1977, he began broadcasting on WGPR (107.5) in Detroit and soon gathered a diverse audience attracted to his "genre bending" format. Moving to WJLB around 1982, Mojo gained additional listeners at the more easily found 97.9 frequency and billboards throughout Detroit touted the "Landing of the Mothership" at 10:00 every night.

Mojo moved to WHYT (96.3) in 1985 and then WTWR-FM in Toledo, Ohio after a management turnover at WHYT in 1987, until 1990, when he accepted an offer to return to the Detroit airwaves at WMXD. At this time, Mojo began doing remote broadcasts, driving around Detroit, talking to people in the city, while his Production assistant Wendell Burke kept the music going at the studio.

In the mid-nineties, Mojo went back to WGPR. Musically, this included shows focused on single themes, such as symphonic music by black composers, a survey of the jazz and symphonic music of Duke Ellington, and one alternating the music of Billie Holiday with spoken excerpts from her autobiography. He, as before, frequently played recordings in their entirety.

In an unusual arrangement, Mojo was purchasing his air-time from WGPR and then finding his own sponsors for the show. His two primary sponsors at this time were a deli and an insurance agency.

He also dedicated airtime to reading excerpts from his 500-plus page book, The Mental Machine (ISBN 0-9639811-1-0), a work of poetry and prose about community and societal ills.

The late 1990s brought Mojo to WCHB for a stretch in 1998 where he began broadcasting his show over the internet for a short time. He also was making guest appearances on the now defunct WDTR around 2004.

== Influence ==
Mojo's habit was to play entire recordings without interruption. Mojo would often play hours of Prince's music, not only his hits, but deep album cuts and b-sides. When Prince was about to release a new album, Mojo would often play the album in its entirety, and this practice continued into the 1990s.

The trio of artists widely cited as the founders of Detroit techno, Juan Atkins, Kevin Saunderson, and Derrick May have all made mention of Mojo's influence on their musical development, as have second generation Techno artists like Richie Hawtin (Plastikman), Jeff Mills (The fm98 Wizard) and Carl Craig.

Other Detroit radio personalities imitated concepts from his shows during his absence from the Detroit airwaves in the mid-1990s, like with WHYT disk jockey Lisa Lisa, who produced segments on her evening show such as the "Midnight Mix Association" and her version of "Lover's Lane." For a brief period the Midnight Mix Association used a "spaceship" introduction which was similar to Mojo's show which was later replaced by an introduction that had a mixture of The Wizard of Oz, church bells and a Civil defense siren: "We're not in Kansas anymore...it's among the hour to come amongst you and amaze you with absolute incredible out of this world type sounds, look out here we go." Mojo also made calls to the Lisa Lisa show encouraging, as well as thanking her for continuing his "format" in a way that he could be proud of.

== See also ==
- Music of Detroit
