= Derrick May (musician) =

American electronic musician (born 1963)

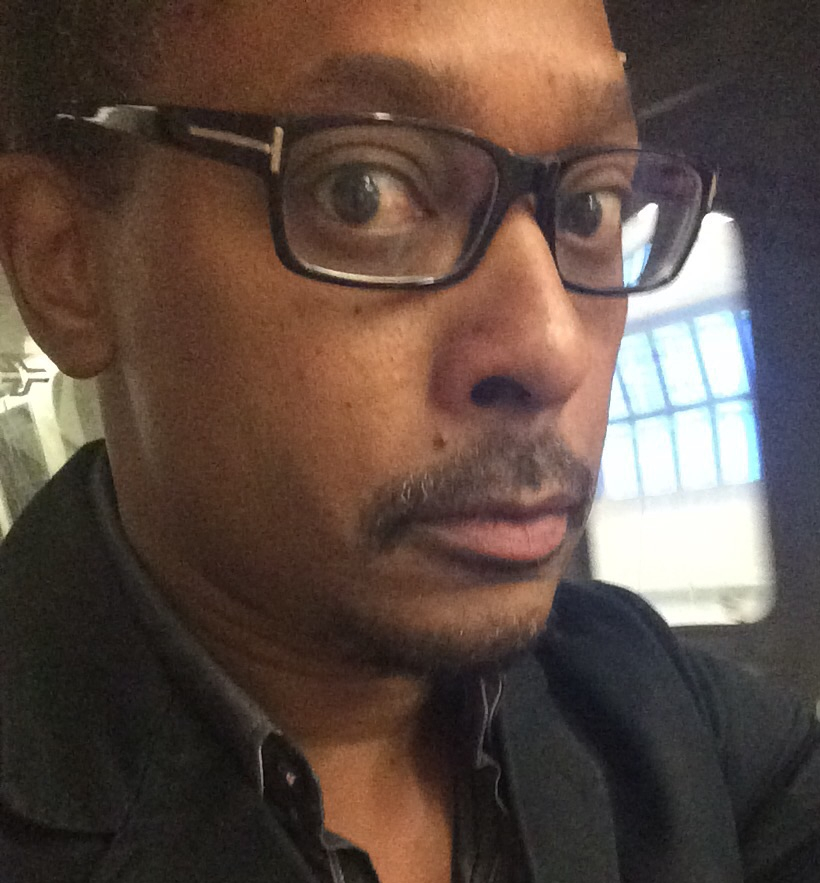
- May in 2015

Background information
- Also known as: Rhythim Is Rhythim; Mayday
- Born: April 6, 1963 (age 63)
- Origin: Detroit, Michigan, U.S.
- Genres: Detroit techno; house; techno; EDM
- Occupations: Producer; DJ
- Years active: 1986–present
- Label: Transmat

Derrick May (born April 6, 1963), also known as Mayday and Rhythim Is Rhythim, is an American electronic musician from Belleville, Michigan, United States. May is credited with pioneering techno music in the 1980s along with collaborators Juan Atkins and Kevin Saunderson, commonly known as The Belleville Three. According to Sal Cinquemani of American Songwriter, May is "one of the most influential of Detroit’s wiz kids."

== Biography ==
=== Early life ===
May is an only child born to a single mother in Detroit. May began to explore electronic music early in his life. At age 13, Derrick May began attending Belleville High School, and became friends with Juan Atkins in 1981. After an altercation, May became friends with Saunderson. Atkins taught May and Kevin Saunderson the essence of DJing as well, formed a trio, Deep Space Soundworks, collectively existing to present their favorite music at parties and clubs. In an interview with a French magazine, May explained that people used to laugh at the ideas that they were entertained by Kraftwerk and disco sounds, we did our thing and continued to believe in ourselves, regardless. During high school, Saunderson and Belleville High School classmate Juan Atkins were fans of DJ Charles "The Electrifying Mojo" Johnson.

When their careers took off, the three young men opened their three individual record labels, Metroplex belonging to Juan Atkins, KMS and Inner City for Kevin Saunderson and Transmat/Fragil all on Gratiot Ave, in Detroit's Eastern Market, this was known as Techno Alley.

=== Career ===
When Derrick May was a teenager, he worked part-time in a video arcade.

May's production career started in 1987 with the release of a record called "Nude Photo" (written by Thomas Barnett), which helped kickstart the Detroit techno music scene. A year later, he followed this release with what was to become one of techno's classic anthems, the seminal track "Strings of Life", which was named by Frankie Knuckles. It "hit Britain in an especially big way during the country's 1987–1988 house explosion." May's best known track, according to Frankie Knuckles, "just exploded. It was like something you can't imagine, the kind of power and energy people got off that record when it was first heard. Mike Dunn says he has no idea how people can accept a record that doesn't have a bassline." The song was featured in video game Midnight Club: Street Racing.

Opened in 1988, The Music Institute in Detroit was where they held their residency. May describes the place as a spiritual place for music. "We had a young beautiful black crowd and I mean beautiful in the sense of spirit mind and soul. We had white kids coming, Spanish kids coming, gay kids coming, straight kids coming."

Derrick was a mentor to many artists. Among them, Carl Craig and Stacey Pullen have cited the difference between May's two labels as Transmat being devoted to original creation, whereas Fragile is where an artist can utilize more sampling. May also ran a side-gig collective known as KAOS, a separate and lesser-known endeavor from Deep Space. May's Transmat Records label was the home of his material, including cuts like "Nude Photo," "Strings of Life," "Kaos" and "It Is What It Is," most produced from 1987 to 1989 as Rhythim Is Rhythim. Though his release schedule all but halted during the 1990s, he continued DJing around the world and helping other artists to release their music on Transmat.

In Surreal Underground Entertainment 1993 America, Carl Craig said he "doesn't want Americans to look back at the music and think of it as a down point in history. The majority of American artists sent their musical efforts to Europe because it is more accepted by a wider audience."

In the documentary about the Detroit techno scene, High Tech Soul, May notes that he saw people in Italy wearing Underground Resistance shirts and was surprised at the group's success outside of Detroit. He says, "People were going crazy over Underground Resistance, and it was like they weren't even there."

Recently, May produced the music for the film of the popular fighting video game Tekken.

For two years, in 2003 and 2004, he was given control of Detroit's popular annual electronic music festival. Originally conceived by Carl Craig, Derrick May, produced for 2 years. He named his event Movement, replacing the Detroit Electronic Music Festival along the Detroit city riverfront. Derrick May claims Carole Marvin stole the idea of festival from himself and Carl Craig. Her actions created a rift in the electronic music community in the talking a self-righteous stance, by firing Carl Craig. In 2004, Kevin Saunderson and Ade' Mainor produced the Festival of Sound Electronically and International Nurtured, in short: Fuse-In for 1 year in 2005. As of 2019, the Detroit Electronic Festival is operated by Paxahau.

Derrick May also still maintains a steady performance schedule, playing internationally many weekends. A pioneer of techno, he produces what he calls Hi-Tek Soul or "George Clinton meeting Kraftwerk in an elevator." He has also cited Yellow Magic Orchestra, Ryuichi Sakamoto and Ultravox as influences.

=== Sexual assault allegations ===
In November 2020, May was accused of sexual assault by several women dating back to the early 2000s. May denies all allegations. In connection with the accusations, he also filed a lawsuit for defamation against Michael James, a collaborator on the track "Strings of Life", who May believed to be pursuing a personal vendetta over unpaid royalties. The suit was later cancelled in February 2021.

== Artistry ==
According to John Bush of AllMusic, Derrick May's traditional sound is a "balance between streamlined percussion-heavy cascades of sound with string samples and a warmth gained from time spent in Chicago, enraptured by the grooves of essential DJs like Ron Hardy and Frankie Knuckles."

== Legacy ==
May has been called the "Miles Davis of techno." According to Sal Cinquemani of American Songwriter: "May’s creations paved the way for later Detroit artists like Plastikman as well as rave culture as we know it."

== Discography ==
=== Albums ===
- Innovator (1996)
- Mysterious Traveller (2002) (with System 7)

=== DJ mixes ===
- The Mayday Mix (1997)
- Derrick May x Air (2010)
- Derrick May x Air Vol. 2 (2011)
- Fact Mix 339 (2012)

=== EPs ===
- Innovator: Soundtrack for the Tenth Planet (1991)

=== Singles ===
- "Let's Go" (1986) (with X-Ray)
- "Nude Photo" (1987) (as Rhythim Is Rhythim)
- "Strings of Life" (1987) (as Rhythim Is Rhythim)
- "It Is What It Is" (1988) (as Rhythim Is Rhythim)
- "Sinister" / "Wiggin" (1988) (as Mayday)
- "Beyond the Dance" (1989) (as Rhythim Is Rhythim)
- "The Beginning" (1990) (as Rhythim Is Rhythim)
- "Icon" / "Kao-tic Harmony" (1993) (as Rhythim Is Rhythim)

== Filmography ==
- Rock & Roll (1995), episode 10 – includes interview with Derrick May.
- Universal Techno (1996) – includes interview with Derrick May inside Detroit's Michigan Theatre, in the Michigan Building.
- Modulations: Cinema for the Ear (1998) – includes interview with Derrick May.
- Pump Up the Volume: A History of House Music (2001) – includes interview with Derrick May.
- High Tech Soul: The Creation of Techno Music (2006) – includes interview with Derrick May.
