= 430 West Records =

American independent record label

- Type: Private
- Industry: Music
- Founded: 1990
- Headquarters: United States Detroit, MI, United States
- Key people: Lawrence Burden (Label Manager), Lenny Burden (Label Manager)
- Website: 430 West Records website

430 West Records is an independent record label based in Detroit, Michigan, United States, formed in 1990 by Lawrence Burden, Lenny Burden, and Lynell Burden, just months after recording their debut record for Derrick Mays' Transmat label. 430 West was formed as an outlet for the Burden Brothers' own productions (recording as Octave One, Random Noise Generation, Never On Sunday, and Metro D). Later it was expanded to be the home for releases by electronic music artists Jay Denham, Terrence Parker, Eddie Fowlkes, Aux 88, Wild Planet, and Gerald Mitchell, among others. In 1998, 430 West also became the musical home for the trio's youngest brothers, Lance Burden and Lorne Burden.

As of 2000, 430 West functions as a production company and record label, focusing once again on the work of the Burden Brothers. The company has distribution, licensing, and promotion relationships in North America, Europe, United Kingdom, and Japan.

== Discography ==
- 1990: 4W-100 Octave One - Octivation The EP (12", EP, Promo)
- 1991: 4W-100B Octave One - Octivation The EP (12", EP)
- 1991: 4W-110 Metro D - What Is A Dancer? (12")
- 1991: 4W-120 Random Noise Generation - Falling In Dub (12")
- 1991: 4W-125 Eddie Flashin Fowlkes - Inequality (12")
- 1991: 4W-140 Vice - Survival Instinct (12")
- 1992: 4W-145 Terrence Parker - TP1 (12")
- 1992: 4W-150 Random Noise Generation - Falling In Dub (The Remixes) (12")
- 1992: 4W-155 Terrence Parker And D.J.B. - The Call My Name (The Remixes) (12")
- 1992: 4W-160 Metro D - In The City (12")
- 1992: 4W-165 Never On Sunday - Day By Day (12")
- 1992: 4W-175 Sight Beyond Sight - Good Stuff (12")
- 1993: 4W-130 Random Noise Generation - Random Beats & Tracks Vol. I (12")
- 1993: 4W-180 Mind Readers - Living My Life Underground (12")
- 1993: 4W-185 Family Of Few - Sunrise (12")
- 1993: 4WCS-190 Aux 88 - Bass Magnetic (Cass, Album)
- 1993: NEVER 1 Various - 430 West Sampler EP (12", W/Lbl, EP)
- 1994: 4W-130 Random Noise Generation - Random Beats & Tracks Vol. I & II (2x12")
- 1994: 4W-190 Aux 88 - Bass Magnetic (2x12", Ltd)
- 1994: 4W-195 Tokyo Gospel Renegades - Tokyo Soul (12")
- 1994: 4W-200 Unit 2 - Keep Your Head Up (2x12")
- 1994: 4W-205 L'Homme Van Renn - The Man (12")
- 1994: 4W-210 365 Black - Home Land (12")
- 1994: 4W-215 Sight Beyond Sight - No More Tears (12")
- 1994: 4W-220 Octave One - The "X" Files (2x12")
- 1994: 4W-225 Random Noise Generation - Random Beats & Tracks Vol. 3 (12")
- 1995: 4W-230 Alien FM - Alien FM (2x12")
- 1995: 4W-235 Various - Detroit Techno City (12")
- 1995: 4W-240 Octave One - Foundation EP (12")
- 1995: 4W-245 Octave One - Conquered Nation (12")
- 1995: 4W-250 Bobby Ceal - The Middle Passage (12")
- 1995: 4W-255 Octave One - Cymbolic (2x12")
- 1995: 4W-260 Unknown Force - Circuit Maximus / Internal Drive (12")
- 1995: 4W-MS10 Octave One - I Believe (12")
- 1996: 4W-265 Octave One - Point Blank (12")
- 1996: 4W-270 Various - Detroit Techno City II (12")
- 1996: 4W-275 Random Noise Generation - Generations Of Soul (12")
- 1996: 4W-280 Octave One - Images From Above (2x12")
- 1997: 4W-285 Random Noise Generation - The Legacy (12")
- 1997: 4W-290 Octave One - The Living Key (2x12")
- 1997: 4WCD-2 Octave One - The Living Key (To Images From Above) (CD, Album)
- 1998: 4W-291 Mad Mike* & DJ Rolando / Octave One - Aztlan / DayStar Rising (12")
- 1998: 4W-295 Wildplanet - Synthetic (12")
- 1998: 4W-300 Octave One - The Collective (2x12", Compilation)
- 1998: 4WCD-1 Aux 88 Meets Alien FM - 88 FM (CD, compilation album)
- 1998: 4WCD-300 Octave One - The Collective (CD, compilation album)
- 1999: 4W-305 Random Noise Generation - Instrument Of Change (12")
- 1999: 4W-310 Octave One - Art And Soul (12")
- 1999: 4W-315 Gerald Mitchell - Groove Within The Groove (12")
- 1999: 4W-320 Wild Planet - Genetic Remixes (12")
- 1999: 4W-325 Octave One Presents Kaotic Spacial Rhythms - M-Class / Kaotic Space(12")
- 1999: 4W-330 Random Noise Generation - The Existence Of Echelon (12")
- 1999: 4W-335 Octave One Presents Kaotic Spacial Rhythm - Kaotic Spacial Rhythms Two (12")
- 1999: 4W-400 Wild Planet - Transmitter (2x12")
- 1999: 4WCD-400 Wild Planet - Transmitter (CD, album)
- 2000: 430WUKT1 DJ Rolando - Jaguar (12")
- 2000: 430WUKT2 DJ Rolando - Jaguar (12", Ltd)
- 2000: 430WUKTCD1 DJ Rolando A.k.a. Aztec Mystic - Jaguar (CD, Maxi)
- 2000: 430WUKTCD2 DJ Rolando - Jaguar (CD, Enh, Maxi)
- 2000: 4W-340 Octave One - Black Water (12")
- 2000: 4W-345 Octave One Presents Kaotic Spacial Rhythms - Kaotic Spacial Rhythms Three - Barrage (12")
- 2000: 4W-350 DJ Rolando - Jaguar (Mayday Remixes) (12")
- 2000: 4W-45011 Random Noise Generation - Links In The Chain (2x12", compilation)
- 2000: 4WCD-4049 DJ Rolando - Jaguar (CD, Maxi)
- 2000: 4WCD-45012 Random Noise Generation - Links In The Chain (CD, compilation album)
- 2002: 4W-500 Random Noise Generation - The Unknown (12")
- 2002: 4W-505 KSR - Down From The Sky (12")
- 2004: 4W-370 Random Noise Generation - Games Of Chance (4 Mixes) (12", W/Lbl, Promo)
- 2004: 4W-380 Random Noise Generation Featuring Lance Burden - A Better Tomorrow / Roof Raiser (12")
- 2005: 4W-385 Octave One - Somedays (12")
- 2005: 4W-390 Random Noise Generation - Rock My Soul (12")
- 2006: 4WDVD560 Octave One - Off The Grid (DVD-10, PAL, NTSC)
- 2008: 4W-590 Octave One - I Need Release (12")
- 2009: 4WCD-600 Octave One - Summers on Jupiter (CD, album)
- 2009: 4W-600 Octave One Summers on Jupiter (2X12")

== See also ==
- List of record labels
