= Waveform Transmission Vol. 2 =

Studio album by The Vision
- Released: 1993
- Genre: Detroit techno
- Length: 32:44
- Label: Tresor
- Producer: Vision

The Vision chronology
Toxin 12 EP (1992)	Waveform Transmission Vol. 2 (1993)	Spectral Nomad (1996)

Waveform Transmission chronology
Waveform Transmission Vol. 1 (1993)	Waveform Transmission Vol. 2 (1993)	Waveform Transmission Vol. 3 (1994)

Waveform Transmission Vol. 2 is an album by American electronic musician and record producer Robert Hood, released under the alias The Vision. Issued in 1993 via Tresor record label, it is the second instalment of the Waveform Transmission series. Featuring a different style from Hood's future releases, the record attributes influences to his collective Underground Resistance and Jeff Mills.

== Critical reception ==
Professional ratings
Review scores
Source	Rating
AllMusic	2.5/5 stars

AllMusic critic Jason Birchmeier found the record to be "nowhere near as realized as his [Hood's] later Tresor recordings such as Internal Empire and Minimal Nation." Birchmeier further stated: "With the syncopated pounding and the maelstrom of looped laser sounds, a stark, austere motif pervades throughout these eight songs; unfortunately, the variety of experimental song ideas so common to his later work is notably absent." Ruaridh Law of Fact described the tracks as "heavy, atonal DJ workouts with plenty of rattling percussion and relatively high BPMs," while comparing them to the "noisy, fast, unrefined-sounding techno" that Hood released on Hard Wax label. Techno: The Rough Guide author Tim Barr thought that the record "demonstrates a distinctive and restless creativity that was all his own."

== Track listing ==
All tracks composed by Vision.

1. "K-Force" — 4:21
2. "Liquification" — 2:01
3. "Weapons" — 2:41
4. "Gamma Scale" — 5:47
5. "Chrome" — 3:23
6. "Projectile Darts" — 5:06
7. "The Protector" — 3:28
8. "Magnetic Storm" — 5:41

== Personnel ==
Album credits as adapted from CD liner notes.

- Vision — producer, mixing
- Krypton — graphic design
