= Industrial techno =

Musical subgenre

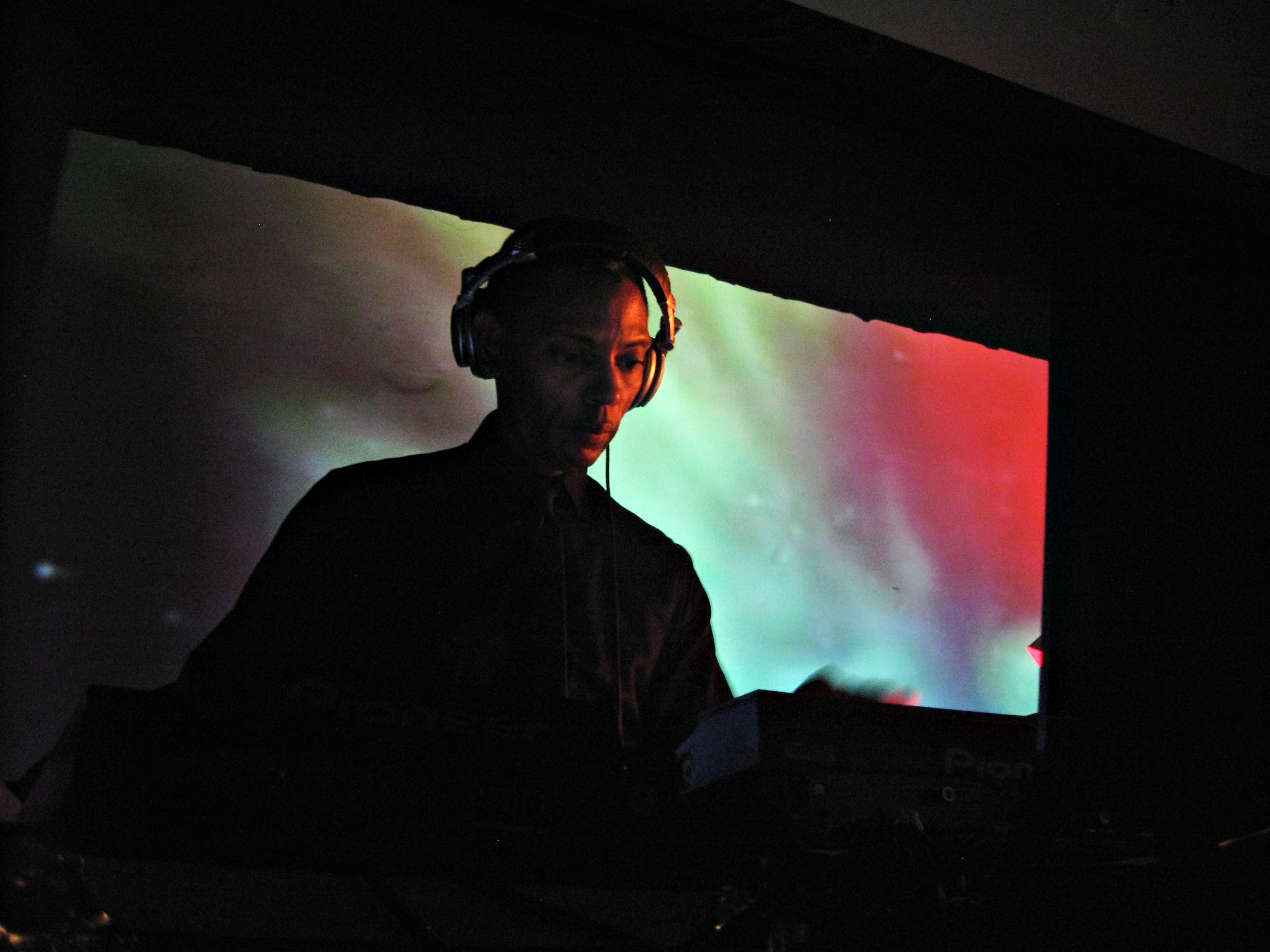
- Jeff Mills performing in 2010
- Stylistic origins: Techno; industrial; electronic; industrial dance
- Cultural origins: Late 1980s to early 1990s, UK, US, Japan

Other topics
- Electro-industrial; electronic body music; power noise

Industrial techno is a subgenre of techno and industrial dance music that originated in the 1990s. Characteristically, it incorporates influences from the bleak, noisy sound and aesthetics of early industrial music acts, particularly Cabaret Voltaire and Throbbing Gristle. American industrial music label Wax Trax! also had a profound influence over the genre's development.

== History ==
The origins of industrial techno date back to the early 1980s with the work of Japanese musician Ryuichi Sakamoto, then a member of Yellow Magic Orchestra. According to Fact and Louder Than War, Sakamoto's solo album B-2 Unit (1980) anticipated the sounds of industrial techno.

Some of the earliest musical projects in the genre include the band Final Cut, formed by Jeff Mills and Anthony Srock in Detroit during the late 1980s. Their 1989 debut industrial-techno album Deep into the Cut was described by The Wire as "a significant moment in the convergence of the classic industrial aesthetic and the emerging sound of Detroit techno".

The genre has seen a resurgence in the 2010s, spearheaded by acts such as Adam X, Orphx, and Ancient Methods, and others later like Blawan and Karenn. Other artists associated with industrial techno include Cut Hands, Helena Hauff, Forward Strategy Group, Surgeon, Michael Forshaw, Jeff Mills, Regis, Dominick Fernow and Mike Banks. Perc Trax record label has been credited with the revival of the genre in the UK, with artists such as Perc, Truss, Happa and Ansome. Some revival artists have subsequently been criticized for making the new music in the genre that "sounds old, that it's overly indebted to a sound invented and thoroughly exhausted in the '90s", but despite this, innovation derived from the post-dubstep and garage scene have been highlighted. As a result, it has gained a significant fanbase from the post-dubstep audience.

== See also ==
- Post-industrial music
