= Motech Records =

- Founded: 2002
- Founder: DJ 3000
- Genre: Detroit techno minimal techno techhouse
- Country of origin: United States
- Location: Detroit, Michigan, U.S.
- Official website: http://www.motechrecords.com/

Motech Records (commonly abbreviated to Motech) is a techno record label founded in 2002 and is operated by producer / DJ Franki Juncaj commonly known as DJ 3000. It is based in Detroit, Michigan, U.S., though also has operations in the Netherlands.

Juncaj founded Motech Records "in 2002 with my best friend Shawn Snell because we saw that electronic music, not only coming out of Detroit, but in general, was getting formulaic and somewhat predictable. We wanted to take the influences we had been exposed to and create something that was our own". Juncaj said he discovered that there were others producing music that was "atypical" to the Detroit sound. From there, Motech Records became an outlet to push boundaries without having to prove anything. Since the initial releases primarily focused on Juncaj's productions under the DJ 3000 moniker, the Motech Records roster has grown internationally to include artists such as Robert Hood, Ken Ishii, Samuel L Session and Mark Broom.

== Notable artists ==
- DJ 3000 (label head)
- Black Phuture
- Gerald Mitchell
- Santiago Salazar
- Subotika
- Gary Martin
- Esteban Adame
- Shawn Snell
- DJ Compufunk
- Ellen Allien
- Jack De Marseille
- Robert Hood
- Samuel L Session
- Ken Ishii
- Alexis Tyrel
- Aux 88
- T. Linder
- Mark Broom
- Mark Flash
- Orlando Voorn
- DJ Bone
- Max Tkacz
- OktoRed
- Diametric
- Veronique Page
