= Abdul Qadim Haqq =

Haqq
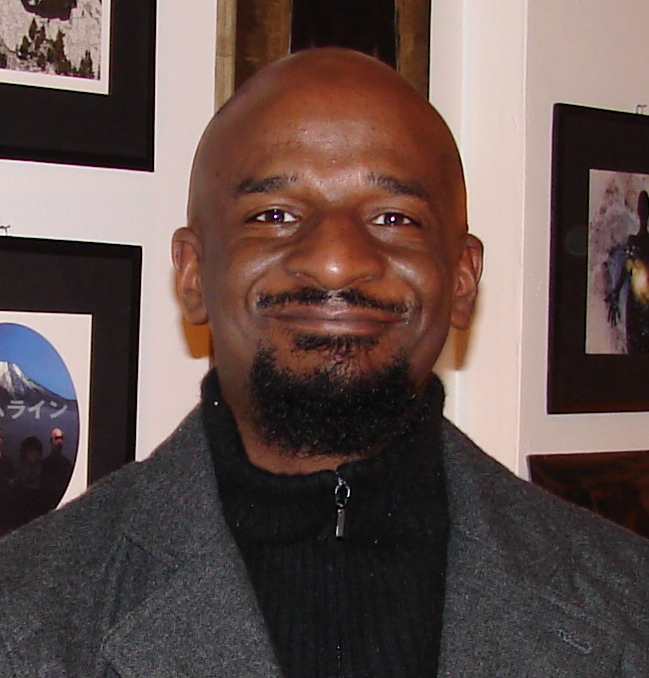
- Education: Center for Creative Studies Alumni 1991
- Known for: Illustration; Futurism; Detroit techno Photography; Author; Classic EDM Album Covers
- Notable work: Requiem for a Machine Soul; 25 Years of Techno Art; The Technanomicron

Abdul Qadim Haqq (born December 24, 1968), also known as Haqq and The Ancient, is an American artist associated with casual culture within the Detroit techno music subculture. Haqq's artwork has been featured on records by Detroit techno artists Juan Atkins, Metroplex, Derrick May, Transmat, Underground Resistance, Kevin Saunderson, and Carl Craig.

Third Earth Visual Arts was founded by Haqq, who infuses sci-fi elements, future-oriented designs, and time travel narratives within his art pieces. His love for fantasy art was inspired by childhood pastimes such as watching sci-fi and Japanese animation. Haqq majored in graphic illustration at the College for Creative Studies.

== Early life and education ==
Haqq was born in Detroit. As a child, he developed an early appreciation for visual art due to science fiction films and animations from Japan. This was instrumental in developing his later artistic style based on futuristic and imagination visual ideas. Later in life Haqq pursued further education in graphic illustration at the College for Creative Studies, which helped him create visual album designs and branding in the music industry.

== Career ==
Haqq completed his first work for Derrick May's record label Transmat in October 1989. It was the start of what would become his long-standing involvement with Detroit techno musicians and record labels.

From the '90s to the 2000s, he worked in creating cover art and visuals for many techno records. He became well-known for creating imagery that defined the image of the Detroit techno culture, especially when working with musicians like Juan Atkins and Carl Craig. The style of his artwork often included futuristic backgrounds, futuristic figures and ideas about advanced civilizations.

Another important project for him was working on the visuals for the music collective Drexciya, whose music was based around an underwater civilization.

In addition, Haqq has participated in exhibitions across the world and in the U.S. The "Abdul Qadim Haqq & Shinichiro Watanabe Joint Exhibition" has been showcased in the Netherlands at the "GalleryIKOI" and in Tokyo, Japan.

In 2014 Haqq published a book titled, "1989–2014: 25 Years of Techno Art" in 2014 as a retrospective compilation of his artwork. This book features photography and illustrations of the Detroit techno scene's important work, including Drexciya, Gerald Mitchell, Dj Rolando, that records the Detroit techno community in one book.

== Artistic style and themes ==
The characteristics of the works created by Haqq include sci-fi imagery, Afro-futurism, and stories based on science fiction concepts such as time traveling. Haqq's art has been interpreted as showing deeper themes within Detroit Techno, technology, identity and imagination of an alternative future.His artwork was also linked with the development of Afrofuturist aesthetics within electronic music culture.
