= Galaxy 2 Galaxy =

Music group

Galaxy 2 Galaxy is a live electronic and jazz music collective featuring members of Underground Resistance. The name comes from an EP created by Mike Banks in 1993. Fame in the techno community rose from the release of A High Tech Jazz Compilation in 2005.

== History ==
Jeff Mills and Mike Banks had an idea that jazz music and musicians could operate with the same "man machine" doctrine that was seen in Kraftwerk's music. This was presaged by early experiments with synthesizers and jazz by artists including Herbie Hancock, Stevie Wonder, Weather Report, Return to Forever, Larry Heard and Lenny White's Astral Pirates. This pointed them in this direction and led to the first "hi-tech jazz release on UR which was Nation 2 Nation in 1990. Mike Banks subsequently released the Galaxy 2 Galaxy EP on UR in 1993.

This EP was an example of "hi-tech jazz" which was a style of music pioneered by UR and named after the track on this EP. Subsequently, the tracks "Journey of the Dragons" and "Hi-Tech Jazz" have appeared on a number of compilations by artists including Danny Krivit and Laurent Garnier. On these compilations, rather than credit Banks, the tracks were attributed to Galaxy 2 Galaxy.

Having created this EP, Mike Banks did not use the name Galaxy 2 Galaxy again. However, from 2005 to commemorate the Tsunami Disaster Relief, the name was used as a name for various members of Underground Resistance playing live, using the same concept as Timeline. This live band includes such notables from the UR stable as Esteban Adame, Santiago Salazar, DJ Dex, Gerald Mitchell, Raphael Merriweathers Jr. and Mike Banks.

== Discography ==
=== Galaxy 2 Galaxy ===
A1 Hi-Tech Jazz (The Science)
A2 Hi-Tech Jazz (The Elements)
B1 Journey Of The Dragons
B2 Star Sailing
C1 Astral Apache (Star Stories)
C2 Deep Space 9 (A Brother Runs This Ship)
D1 Rhythm Of Infinity
D2 Metamorphosis

=== A Hitech Jazz Compilation ===
Disc 1

1 Metamorphosis (3:26)
2 Transition (6:23)
3 The Theory (Mind Mix) (2:25)
4 Return Of The Dragons (7:14)
5 Big Stone Lake (4:18)
6 Sometimes I Feel Like (6:14)
7 Body And Soul (5:32)
8 Nation 2 Nation (5:19)
9 303 Sunset (3:25)
10 A Moment In Time (3:09)
11 Jupiter Jazz (4:30)
12 Amazon (4:36)
13 Astral Apache (5:20)
14 Deep Space 9 (5:46)

Disc 2

1 Hi-Tech Jazz (5:37)
2 Star Sailing (6:31)
3 Windchime (6:09)
4 Timeline (6:35)
5 First Galactic Baptist Church (7:11)
6 Inspiration (6:31)
7 Momma's Basement (7:09)
8 Afro's, Arps And Minimoogs (12" Mix) (6:48)
