= DJ Rolando =

American DJ

- Born: Mexicantown, Detroit, U.S.
- Genres: Techno, House
- Occupations: Musician; record producer; DJ
- Years active: 1987-present
- Labels: Underground Resistance, Delsin, Ostgut Ton
- Formerly of: Underground Resistance

DJ Rolando (born Rolando Rocha) a.k.a. The Aztec Mystic is an American techno DJ and producer from Detroit, Michigan, United States. A former member of Detroit’s famed Underground Resistance from 1994 to 2004, he is best known for his song "Jaguar". Rolando parted ways with UR and relocated to Edinburgh in 2004, where he remains an active DJ, frequently appearing at prominent European venues including Tresor and Berghain.

== Personal life ==
Rolando grew up in Mexicantown, Detroit. He states that his father was a musician: "He was a very talented guy. He was one of these dudes who just picked up an instrument and—BOOM—played it right away. I wish I had half the talent he had." Rolando moved to Edinburgh in the mid-2000s.

== Career ==
Rolando was inspired by seeing Jeff Mills perform in 1986, and began DJing the subsequent year. He first got his DJing equipment in 1987. He played at neighborhood venues and started off playing early hip-hop, electro, and Latin freestyle. He started attending techno and house parties in the early and mid-1990s, stating that "it was unbelievable to hear a whole night of this music. It was life changing."

Rolando was introduced to Underground Resistance in 1994, being in conversation with Mike Banks, James Pennington, James Stinson, and Andre Holland. In 1999, his track "Knights of the Jaguar" became the subject of a heated copyright battle with Sony BMG, who were "seemingly unaware of the collective’s stance towards corporate entities [and] first attempted to license, and then bootlegged [the track] as a cover version, before being issued a cease-and-desist." Billed as "Jaguar" it peaked at #43 in the UK Singles Chart in October 2000.

The track's reputation and popularity has continued to grow. Matthew Kershaw, music editor of the magazine Mixmag, named "Jaguar" among 2000's "uncategorisable" club tracks in the liner notes of the Kiss mix album Kiss House Nation 2001, highlighting its "builds and constantly evolving structure". In 2013, it was voted the 26th best House track of all time by Mixmag readers.

== Discography ==
Singles / Extended Plays

- The Aztec Mystic (1996)
- Octave One - Aztlan / DayStar Rising (1998) w/ Mike Banks
- Knights Of The Jaguar EP (1999)
- Revenge Of The Jaguar - The Mixes (2000)
- Hiatus EP (2008)
- The Afterlife EP (2008)
- 5 To 9 EP (2010)
- The Test (2011) w/ Nic Fanciulli
- The Lost Mixes Part 2 EP (2012) w/ Nic Fanciulli
- D & N's EP (2013)
- Wheesht EP (2014)
- Juu EP (2014)
- Undercover EP (2015)
- Time to Jack EP (2017)
