= Nighttime World Volume 1 =

Nighttime World, Volume 1
- Original 1995 LP

Studio album by Robert Hood
- Released: 1995
- Recorded: M-Plant Studios, Detroit
- Genre: Electronic; downtempo
- Length: 43:36
- Label: Cheap
- Producer: Robert Hood

Robert Hood chronology
Internal Empire (1994)	Nighttime World, Volume 1 (1995)	Nighttime World Volume 2 (2000)

Nighttime World Volume 1 is an album by American electronic musician Robert Hood, released in 1995 on Cheap Records. Compared to his previous minimal techno work, the record features influences and elements from jazz, soul and downtempo. Its follow-up record, Nighttime World Volume 2, built upon the style of its predecessor and was released on Hood's M-Plant in 2000.

== Background ==
The record draws upon soul, jazz and downtempo styles, while preserving four-on-the-floor structures on a plethora of tracks; AllMusic critic John Bush described Nighttime World Volume 1 as "practically a soul album." Pitchfork's Andrew Gaerig remarked that the record was "pock-marked with jazz and made sidelong glances at house." On the stylistic change, Hood stated:

That turned everything upside down when it was first released, people were scratching their heads. I’d done Internal Empire and Minimal Nation, and now here was some listening music. It took you from jazz to techno to experimental to minimal. I wanted people to know I wasn’t one-dimensional. My idea was that after the club has closed and you’re headed home, away from the crowd and there’s solitude. That was my idea a night drive along the Detroit River when it’s just you and your thoughts.

Hood has cited jazz artists Joe Sample, The Crusaders, Jean-Luc Ponty and Donald Byrd as influences for mixing different sounds. The album opener "Behind This Door" features a string section, while the track "The Colour of Skin" is led by a piano vamp and hip hop tempo. The latter was "written from the perspective of a black kid growing up in Detroit but looking at the city from a watcher’s point of view." The track "Untitled" was based on a Hood's former track "Moveable Parts", originally released on the namesake 12".

== Critical reception ==
Professional ratings
Review scores
Source	Rating
AllMusic	5/5 stars

AllMusic critic John Bush labeled the record as "more than just a collection of great tracks" unlike Internal Empire, noting the soul influence and "Hood's growth as a producer not posing a threat to his sound". Bush further described the album as "one of the most inventive full-lengths to come out of Detroit." Matt Miner of Westword described it as a "soulful classic" and "one of the finest electronic-music albums ever to come out of Detroit."

== Track listing ==
All tracks written by Robert Hood.

1. "Behind This Door" — 5:05
2. "Nighttime World" — 5:25
3. "Episode No. 19" — 3:48
4. "The Color of Skin" — 3:46
5. "Electric Nigger Pt. 1" — 7:56
6. "Nighttime" — 4:32
7. "Untitled" — 7:24
8. "Stark Reality" — 5:47

== Personnel ==
Album personnel as adapted from liner notes:

- Robert Hood — writer, producer
- Manfred Hummel — mastering (credited as HM)
