= Final Cut (band) =

American musical group

Final Cut is a techno-industrial band formed in Detroit, Michigan and led by Anthony Srock with a revolving cast of guest musicians.

== History ==
Srock, then a DJ in Detroit, formed Final Cut (sometimes preceded by The) in the late 1980s as a collaboration with DJ Jeff Mills. They released their debut single "Take Me Away" in 1989 and the album Deep in 2 the Cut later that year. Final Cut was noted for mixing established industrial music with Detroit techno, with a sound comparable to heavy metal but made with machines rather than guitars. Deep in 2 the Cut gained appreciation years later as an influential early entry in the development of industrial music. Mills then left the project, and Srock took a leadership role with various guest musicians and a more guitar-oriented sound.

The project was signed to I.R.S. Records and their second album Consumed was released in 1992. That year, Final Cut toured with an all-live band with Srock on lead vocals. After a period of inactivity, Srock returned with another collection of guest musicians in 1996, releasing the album Atonement. This album added 1970s funk to the project's established industrial sound. A remix EP titled Grind was released in 1998. A new album was started in 2004 but never completed.

Srock later founded Full Effect Records. The 2009 hit single "Warriors Dance" by The Prodigy featured a sample of the Final Cut song "Take Me Away".

== Selected collaborators ==
- Taime Downe
- Ogre
- Martin Atkins
- Charles Levi
- Chris Connelly
- Louis Svitek
- William Tucker
- Dwayne Goettel
- Jeff Mills
- Greg Lucas
- Max Edgin
- Joe Lafata

== Discography ==
=== Albums ===
- Deep into the Cut (1989)
- Consumed (1992)
- Atonement (1996)
- Grind (EP, 1998)
