= X-101 =

X101 or X-101 may refer to:

- Kh-101 (Cyrillic: Х-101), a Russian long range cruise missile
- X-101 Destroyer, an album produced by Mike Banks (musician)
