= Santiago Salazar =

Santiago Salazar may refer to:

- Santiago Salazar (footballer)
- Santiago Salazar (musician)
