= Deep into the Cut =

Studio album by Final Cut
- Released: 1989
- Genres: Industrial; techno; EBM
- Length: 1:00:50 (CD)
- Label: Full Effect
- Producers: Mike Banks; Jeff Mills

Final Cut chronology
Deep into the Cut (1989)	Consumed (1992)

Deep into the Cut (also known as Deep in 2 The Cut) is the debut studio album of Final Cut, released in 1989 by Full Effect Records.

== Reception ==
Professional ratings
Review scores
Source	Rating
AllMusic	3/5 stars

AllMusic awarded the album three out of five stars and said "the sounds on Deep Into the Cut do retain a substantial amount of harsh aggression, with Mills and Srock favoring rude, dark sounds -- a style of heavy metal without guitars but rather malicious machines and a sense of nihilism."

== Track listing ==
All music is composed by Jeff Mills and Anthony Srock.

Here
No.	Title	Length
1.	"Intro to the Cut"
2.	"Open Your Eyes"
3.	"The Prosecuted"
4.	"Burn Baby Burn"
5.	"The Escape"

There
No.	Title	Length
1.	"Now To That's Funky"
2.	"Harmony"
3.	"I Told You Not to Stop"
4.	"Celestial USU"

CD issue track listing
No.	Title	Length
1.	"She Destroys"	5:45
2.	"Rotation"	5:50
3.	"Temptation"	7:56
4.	"I Told You Not to Stop"	5:35
5.	"Burn Baby Burn"	7:00
6.	"Now That's Funky"	5:53
7.	"Harmony"	5:33
8.	"Celestial V.S.U."	3:56
9.	"Open Your Eyes"	7:26
10.	"The Prosecuted"	5:51
11.	"The Escape"	2:45

== Personnel ==
Adapted from the Deep into the Cut liner notes.

Final Cut

- Jeff Mills – instruments, production
- Anthony Srock – instruments

Production and design

- Mike Banks (as Mad Mike Banks) – production

== Release history ==
Region	Date	Label	Format	Catalog
United States	1989	Full Effect	LP	FE0700
United States	1990	Full Effect	LP	FE0700
Germany	1990	Big Sex	CD	Big Sex 015
United Kingdom	2016	We Can Elude Control	LP	WCEC012
