= Lifestyles of the Laptop Café =

2001 album by James Stinson

Studio album by the Other People Place
- Released: September 3, 2001
- Genre: Detroit techno
- Length: 51:51
- Label: Warp
- Producer: The Other People Place

Lifestyles of the Laptop Café is the only studio album by the Other People Place, a recording project by American electronic music producer James Stinson. It was released on September 3, 2001, through Warp. Stinson's identity as the album's producer was not confirmed until after his death in 2002. Largely overlooked at the time of its release, Lifestyles of the Laptop Café has since received retrospective critical acclaim. After being out of print for several years, the album was reissued by Warp in 2017.

== Background and composition ==
Lifestyles of the Laptop Café was conceived as one of seven conceptually-linked releases by James Stinson's group Drexciya and its offshoot projects, and while not conceptually the first in the series, it was the first to be released.

Veering away from the complex science fiction themes of Stinson's work with Drexciya, Lifestyles of the Laptop Café is a more subdued album in content and mood. The album's lyrics—often limited per song to single, repeated sentences—express feelings of yearning and loneliness. The opening track, "Eye Contact", revolves around a spoken monologue in which a man falls in love with a woman in an Internet café, beginning a romantic narrative that plays out over the course of the remaining tracks. Musically, the album draws on influences from electro, techno and electropop. Fact's Daniel Montesinos-Donaghy describes its musical style as a "lush and often romantic mid-tempo take on Detroit techno", while Ken Taylor of AllMusic writes that the album is dominated by "jazzy tech-house rhythms". Stinson's production juxtaposes "brisk, scuttling" rhythms with melancholic synthesizer melodies. Several of the album's songs feature Stinson's own vocals.

== Release ==
Lifestyles of the Laptop Cafe was issued by Warp on September 3, 2001. Former label employee Tom Browne recalled its release as being "really low-key". The album's cover art was designed by the graphic design studio The Designers Republic and features a photograph by Matt Pyke of a PowerBook laptop in a forest located near Warp's offices. Keeping with the secrecy of Drexciya, the Other People Place's identity was not publicly disclosed. An October 2001 profile by Muzik described the magazine's attempt at contacting the Other People Place for an interview, which was met with a response from "a now defunct e-mail address whose user claimed to be at a console deep beneath the ocean waves somewhere off the coast of Malta". Nonetheless, James Stinson was long rumored to have been behind the project, which was later confirmed following his death in 2002.

While initially released to little attention, over the following years the album gradually increased in reputation. Lifestyles of the Laptop Café remained out of print until a petition to re-release the album, prompted by reports of secondhand copies being sold at exceedingly high prices on online retailers such as Discogs, was launched by fans. In response, Warp re-issued the album on vinyl on February 10, 2017. It peaked at number seven on the UK Official Vinyl Albums Chart.

== Critical reception ==
Professional ratings
Review scores
Source	Rating
AllMusic	4/5 stars
NME	7/10
Pitchfork	7.8/10 (2002); 8.8/10 (2017)
Resident Advisor	5/5
Spectrum Culture	4.5/5 stars
Uncut	8/10

In a contemporary review, Mark Richardson of Pitchfork compared Lifestyles of the Laptop Café to Drexciya's work, noting a "similarly rigid" quality, while nonetheless differentiating it as "much more relaxed, with slow-to-mid tempos and a velvety sonic palette", concluding that its charm comes from "its subtlety". Writing in AllMusic, Ken Taylor felt that "every track treats the music respectfully, pushing forward in a very new groove", while NME called it a "warm, inviting and accessible" record. In contrast, Exclaim!'s Cam Lindsay deemed the album unchallenging, unoriginal and "quite dated", suggesting that it would only be worth acquiring by "Warp enthusiasts".

Retrospectively, Lifestyles of the Laptop Café has increased in acclaim. In 2010, Resident Advisor named it the fifteenth best album of the 2000s. Site critic Chris Burkhalter described it as a "touching and human" record that "made Stinson's untimely passing a year later all the more heartbreaking." Resident Advisor's Matt Unicomb wrote that its "subtle genius has since been revealed through the simplicity for which it was criticized", deeming it "one of electronic music's most essential records". Spectrum Culture critic Daniel Bromfield called it "one of the most intimate of all techno records... what makes Lifestyles such a wonderful listen is the deep sense of comfort it imparts despite its robotic composition". Pitchfork's Andy Beta reflected that Stinson "looks out onto a world increasingly disassociated, communicating by computers instead of voices", calling the album "prescient in imagining our current connected-yet-disconnected state", while suggesting that it also anticipated "a shift in how people even interact with electronic music, geared more towards home listening than the club."

== Track listing ==
All tracks are written by the Other People Place.

Lifestyles of the Laptop Café track listing
No.	Title	Length
1.	"Eye Contact"	5:30
2.	"It's Your Love"	7:31
3.	"Moonlight Rendezvous"	7:07
4.	"You Said You Want Me"	4:23
5.	"Let Me Be Me"	7:46
6.	"Running from Love"	5:50
7.	"Lifestyles of the Casual"	5:29
8.	"Sunrays"	8:15
Total length:		51:51

== Charts ==
Chart (2017)	Peak position
UK Vinyl Albums (OCC)	7
