= Octave One =

Group of American techno musicians

- Also known as: Random Noise Generation; Never On Sunday
- Origin: Michigan, U.S.
- Genres: Techno, Detroit techno, house, jungle, drum and bass
- Instruments: Synthesizer, Drum Machine, Mixing console, Drum sequencer (controller) and Sound effect
- Years active: 1989-present
- Labels: 430 West Records, Tresor, Concept Music
- Members: Lawrence Burden, Lenny Burden, Lynell Burden, Lance Burden, Lorne Burden
- Website: Official Site

Octave One is a group of American techno musicians composed of siblings Lenny Burden and Lawrence Burden, sometimes associated with their three other brothers, Lorne Burden, Lynell Burden and Lance Burden. In 1989, the group debuted on Derrick May's Transmat record label with the single "I Believe". In 1990, "I Believe" was included on the compilation Techno 2: The Next Generation (10 Records). Also In 1990, with their brother Lynell, they formed the record label 430 West Records to release the vinyl record Octave One "The Octivation EP". Octave One have remixed recordings for Massive Attack, Joey Negro, DJ Rolando, Steve Bug, John Thomas, The Trammps, Rhythim is Rhythm, and Inner City. In 2000, Octave One released their most commercially successful recording, "Blackwater". In 2002, "Blackwater" was remixed by the band with a reworked live string arrangement performed by the Urban Soul Orchestra in London, England. The single was re-released by Concept Music (United Kingdom), Ministry of Sound/Voidcom (Germany), Vendetta Records (Spain), and Tinted (Australia) in the same year. It peaked at #47 (February 2002) and #69 (September 2002) in the UK Singles Chart.

Octave One tour the world as live electronic musicians. They are included in the second generation of Detroit techno artists.

Mainly known for their techno recordings, the Burden brothers have also produced many recordings of house music and other electronic genres using other pseudonyms, in particular Random Noise Generation, Metro D (with Terrell Langston) and Never On Sunday.

== Discography ==
=== Octave One ===
Year	Title	Format(s)	Label
1990	I Believe	12" Vinyl EP	Transmat
1991	Octivation EP	12" Vinyl EP	430 West Records
1994	The X Files	2x12" Vinyl EPs	430 West Records
1995	Conquered Nation	12" Vinyl EP	430 West Records
1995	Cymbolic	2x12" Vinyl EPs	430 West Records
1995	Foundation EP	12" Vinyl EP	430 West Records
1996	Images From Above	2x12" Vinyl EPs	430 West Records
1996	Point-Blank	12" Vinyl EP	430 West Records
1997	The Living Key	2x12" Vinyl EPs	430 West Records
1997	The Living Key (To Images From Above)	CD	430 West Records
1998	DayStar Rising	12" Vinyl EP	430 West Records
1998	The Collective	CD, 2x12"Vinyl EPs	430 West Records
1999	Art And Soul	12" Vinyl EP	430 West Records
2000	Black Water	12" Vinyl EP	430 West Records
2004	The Theory Of Everything	CD, 3x12"Vinyl EPs	Concept Music
2005	Somedays	12" Vinyl EP	430 West Records
2006	Off the Grid/Love and Hate	12" Vinyl	Tresor
2007	Off the Grid	DVD/CD, 2x12" Vinyl EPs	Tresor
2008	Here Comes The Push/I Need Release	12" Vinyl EP	430 West Records
2009	Summers On Jupiter	CD, 2x12" Vinyl EPs	430 West Records
2015	Burn It Down	CD, 2x12" Vinyl EPs	430 West Records
2016	Love By Machine	CD, CD + CDr Promo, 2x12" Vinyl EPs	430 West Records
2016	Just Don't Speak	12" Vinyl	430 West Records
2016	Jazzo Reworks / Bad Love	12" Vinyl	430 West Records
2019	Locus Of Control Vol. 1	12" Vinyl	430 West Records

=== Random Noise Generation ===
Year	Title	Format	Label
1991	Falling In Dub	12"	430 West Records
1992	Falling In Dub	12", CD, Maxi	Low Spirit Recordings
1992	Falling In Dub (The Remixes)	12"	430 West Records, Outer Rhythm, Buzz
1993	Random Beats & Tracks Vol. I	12"	430 West Records
1994	Random Beats & Tracks Vol. I & II	2x12"	430 West Records
1994	Random Beats & Tracks Vol. 3	12"	430 West Records
1996	Generations Of Soul	12"	430 West Records
1997	The Legacy	12"	430 West Records
1999	(The Existence Of) Echelon	12"	430 West Records
1999	Instrument Of Change	12"	430 West Records
1999	The Existence Of Echelon	12"	430 West Records
2000	Links In The Chain	2x12, CD, Compilation	430 West Records
2002	The Unknown	12"	430 West Records
2004	A Better Tomorrow / Roof Raiser	12"	430 West Records
2004	Games Of Chance (4 Mixes)	12", W/Lbl, Promo	430 West Records
2005	Reign	2x12", CD, album	Concept Music
2005	Rock My Soul	12"	430 West Records
