= James Stinson =

James Stinson may refer to:

- James Stinson (musician), a member of the electronic music duo Drexciya
- James Stinson (How I Met Your Mother), a character on the American TV series
