= Esteban Adame =

- Born: Los Angeles California
- Genres: Jazz, techno
- Occupations: Pianist; record producer; DJ
- Instruments: Piano, synths
- Years active: early 1990s-present
- Member of: Underground Resistance, Galaxy 2 Galaxy
- Website: wwww.estebanadame.com

Esteban Adame is an American DJ. His career originated from the rave culture of Chicanos and Latinos in the 1990s. He started DJing at the age of 15. In 2004, he was asked by "Mad" Mike Banks of Underground Resistance to join the music collective in Detroit, Michigan. Banks reportedly was interested when he "found out Chicanos from Southern California were interested in UR records, sensing a common ground between Los Angeles's Latino enclaves and the Black neighborhoods of Detroit." Adame would go on to play piano for the label's electronic jazz band Galaxy 2 Galaxy.

In 2006, he founded label Ican with Santiago Salazar and has released multiple productions for the label. He has collaborated with Nomadico, who he formed the group El Coyote with, as well as DJ 3000. In 2019, he and Nomadico played the Carnaval De Bahidorá festival in Mexico. Adame also releases music under the name Frequencia, which has been described as the experimental and "darker side of his productions."

After his years in the DJ life, Esteban Adame is currently teaching a small school, Artesia High School, and has been teaching there since 2017. He has also achieved a Doctoral Degree from Boston University in Boston, Massachusetts.

== Discography ==
=== Albums ===
- Day Labor (2014)

=== Singles & EPs ===
- Unofficial Discourse (2018)
- Mayan Basement EP (2018)
- Angeleno EP (2018) w/ Santiago Salazar
- Mextli EP (2017)
- Descendants EP (2017)
- Notice This EP (2014) w/ Nef Nunez
- Brown Dream EP (2013)
- Determinacion EP (2011)
- East Los Luv EP (2011)
