= Members of the House =

American house music group

Members Of The House
- Origin: Detroit, Michigan
- Genre: House music/Techno
- Years active: 1987-1995, 2016
- Label: Underground Resistance
- Past members: Core Four: Hassan Watkins, Bill Beaver, Randy "Paul" McKaskill, Quentin McRae Avery Midnite, Bill Beaver, Charlie Gilreath, Clarence Kendricks Jr., Crystal Gaynor, Hassan Watkins, Jeff Mills, Lawrence D. Hall, Mike Banks, Niko Marks, Quentin McRae, Randy Paul McKaskill, Raphael Merriweathers Jr., Ron Andrews, Roxanne Jordan, Rufus Harris, Scott Weatherspoon, Teddy Dudley, Tunesia Fowler, Yolanda Reynolds

Members of the House was house music group founded by Mike Banks in Detroit in the late 1980s. The four man vocal core that consisted of Bill Beaver, Hassan Watkins, Quentian McRase, and Randy " Paul" McKaskill briefly became an overnight sensation in Europe.

== Influences ==
The groups influences drew from a deep well of Detroit's musical DNA. Detroit's musical foundations were steeped in Motown's legacy, gospel, and R&B. These traditions that help shape the city's club and dance music scenes for decades before house arrived. The arrival of house musical starts with mixing with Motown's soul, funk and new electronic sounds. The influences for each member were personal. Hassan Watkins described himself as a soul singer who dabbled in church music before Banks recruited him. Their vocal approach leaned heavily on the Motown model where Hassan Watkins and Bill Beaver compared the group ot the Temptations, and the discipline Banks instilled mirrored Berry Gordy's production philosophy. Mike Banks had known how to play bass and guitar with Parliament/Funkadelic which gave him a deep grounding in Black American funk and soul traditions.

== Career ==
The group began as a loose collective before settling into its core line up. "Members of the House" earliest release was in 1987 of a compilation called "Keep Believin'", along with "Share this House" (1988), "Reach Out For The Love" (1991), "These Are My People"/Feel the Fire" (1991). Their breakthrough came with "Reach Out For The Love", which gained weekend radio play on Detroit's WJLB through Jeff Mills' Saturday night house mix that soon reached overseas. There 1991 European tour was their commercial peak with having done 32 shows in a single mother, crowds up to 5,000 people, features in Blue & Soul magazine and a near deal with Sony. In Detroit, they weren't that well known, and the group released records until around 1995 before fading from the view.

== Relation to techno ==
"Members of the House" existed at the precise origin point of what would become Detroit's global techno legacy. Underground Resistance, that features Jeff Mills, Robert Hood, and Mad Mike Banks, formed part of the second wave of Detroit techno that broke through internationally in the early 1990s. Before that, Banks had been building a different kind of music basement. One that was soulful, vocal and euphoric. The group originally released records on Underground Resistance before Banks and Derwin Hall launched Happy Records. "Members of the House" in the world shared with other house music artists by sharing studios, collaborating on music, and record labels with the figures who would go on to define Detrios techno globally.

== Sound and technology ==
The group's sound was built on stacked gospel style harmonies layered over house production. Watkins describe it was "harmony chords on top of house", with unison passages giving it a gospel like quality. All recording was done on two inch analog tape with MIDI chained equipment. They didn't use any computer or digital editing. Detroit electronic music was produced using synthesizers, drum machines, multi track mixers, and tape recording equipment. These were the tools that were affordable and accessible.

== Legacy ==
"Members of the House" put a face on a genre that has been used to being faceless. Derwin Hall has mentioned that you could listen to house musical all night and never know the artist's name, "Members of the House" helped change that. The Oxford Handbook of Electronic Dance Music argues that Detroit house and techno represent a form of Black cultural heritage that has been historically under protected and unrecognized.
