= Terrence Parker =

American musician

- Parker performing in 2010 at K4 club in Ljubljana, Slovenia.

Background information
- Also known as: Telephone man
- Origin: Detroit, Michigan, United States
- Genres: Detroit house
- Occupations: Producer, DJ
- Instrument: Turntables
- Years active: 1980–present
- Labels: 430 West; Sony Music Entertainment; Studio !K7
- Website: www.terrenceparkermusic.com

Terrence Parker is an American house DJ and music producer from Detroit, Michigan, United States.

== Biography ==
Parker has a long career in DJing. In 2010 he celebrated his 30th music anniversary. He has been actively DJing in hundreds of cities around the world. These events range from night clubs (large and small) to music festivals with more than 100,000 people. Since 1988, Parker has released more than 100 recordings on various labels, and has had top 20 hits with his songs "Love's Got Me High", "The Question" and albums such as Detroit After Dark in the UK, The Netherlands, Germany, and France. Parker can be known for his spiritual side and adding that into his music. He is nicknamed "The Telephone man" because he uses a telephone handset as headphones.

== Partial discography ==
- Tragedies of a Plastic Soul Junkie (1996)
- Emancipation of My Soul (1996)
- Detroit After Dark (1997)
- No Weapons Formed Against Me Shall Prosper (1997) (as Seven Grand Housing Authority)
- GOD Loves Detroit (2014)
- Life On The Back 9 (2017)
