= Consumed (Final Cut album) =

Studio album by Final Cut
- Released: 1992
- Genre: Electro-industrial
- Length: 53:13
- Label: I.R.S.
- Producer: Joseph Lafata; Anthony Srock

Final Cut chronology
Deep into the Cut (1989)	Consumed (1992)	Atonement (1996)

Consumed is the second studio album by Final Cut, released in 1992 by I.R.S. Records.

== Reception ==
Professional ratings
Review scores
Source	Rating
AllMusic	3/5 stars

AllMusic awarded Consumed three out of five stars and said it "steps neatly into the cold-wave style that many other Nettwerk-distributed bands were practicing at the same time, most notably Front 242 and Manufacture."

== Track listing ==
No.	Title	Writer(s)	Length
1.	"U.F.O.T.M."	Anthony Srock; William Tucker	6:55
2.	"Methodical Virtue"	Joseph Lafata; Srock; Tucker	4:26
3.	"Tranquilized"	Chris Connelly; Srock; Tucker	5:13
4.	"Clean the Machine"	Srock; Tucker	4:14
5.	"A Dance for the Saints"	Lafata; Srock	6:02
6.	"I Believe in You"	Lafata; Srock	4:36
7.	"Testament"	Lafata; Srock	5:27
8.	"Fear"	Connelly; Lafata; Srock	4:38
9.	"Broken"	Lafata; Srock	6:47
10.	"Primal Understanding"	Connelly; Srock; Tucker	4:55

== Personnel ==
Adapted from the Consumed liner notes.

Final Cut

- Joseph Lafata – keyboards, drums, percussion, backing vocals, arrangements, production, mixing
- Anthony Srock – vocals, keyboards, drum programming, arrangements, production, engineering, mixing
- William Tucker – guitar, noises, co-producer, mixing

Additional performers

- Chris Connelly – vocals and backing vocals (3, 8, 10)
- Hobey Echlin – bass guitar (5, 7)
- John Garstecki – keyboards (2, 6, 10)
- Ryan Moore – vocals (4, 8, 9)
- Michael Segal – guitar (5)
- Dave Straughter – vocals (9)
- Dennis White – guitar (7, 9), bass guitar (7)

Production and design

- Tom Baker – mastering
- Mike E. Clark – engineering, assistant programming (3, 6, 7)
- David Feeny – engineering
- George Maniatis – co-producer, mixing
- John Rummen – photography, design
- Shawn Stubbs – assistant engineering
- Jessica Villines – assistant engineering

== Release history ==
Region	Date	Label	Format	Catalog
United States	1992	I.R.S.	CD, CS	X2-13147
Canada	1992	Nettwerk	CD	W2-30060
