= Transmat =

Record label

- Transmat logo
- Founded: 1986
- Founder: Derrick May
- Status: Inactive
- Genre: Techno
- Country of origin: United States
- Location: Detroit, Michigan
- Official website: www.transmat.net

Transmat is the record label of Detroit techno musician Derrick May, founded in 1986. Its artists included Rhythim Is Rhythim, James Pennington, Joey Beltram, and Carl Craig. Transmat included the sub-label Fragile Records. Transmat Records was located in the Eastern Market district of Detroit, in an area dubbed by May as "Techno Boulevard". The label had its own building in which May produced music. The building later became the La Ventana Cafe.

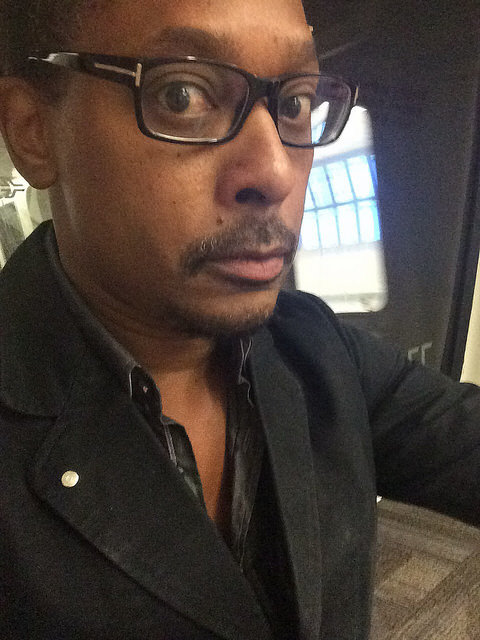
Creator of Transmat Records, Derrick May

== Artists ==
- Juan Atkins
- Joey Beltram
- Carl Craig
- Robert Hood
- Derrick May
- Octave One
- James Pennington
- Stacey Pullen
- Rhythim Is Rhythim
- Karim Sahraoui
- Hiroshi Watanabe

== See also ==
- List of electronic music record labels
