= Internal Empire =

- Original 1994 CD cover

Studio album by Robert Hood
- Released: 1994
- Studio: M-Plant Studio, Detroit
- Genre: Minimal techno
- Length: 49:20
- Label: Tresor; Logic
- Producer: Robert Hood

Robert Hood chronology
Minimal Nation (1994)	Internal Empire (1994)	Nighttime World Volume 1 (1995)

Internal Empire is an album by American electronic musician Robert Hood. It was released in 1994 through Tresor, as a follow-up to Minimal Nation, released in the same year. The album showcases a further development on Hood's minimal sound, as well as departure from his collaborations with Underground Resistance. Alongside Minimal Nation, the album is cited as one of the important works in minimal techno genre.

The album was reissued by Tresor in 2019, as a part of its 25th anniversary. It was previously reissued by the label in 1998. The label Minus takes its name from the namesake track from the record.

== Background ==
On the album's recording, Hood stated that he was faced with the challenge of producing a follow-up to Minimal Nation; he subsequently cancelled his tour dates and recorded Internal Empire on his living studio. On the sound, he has stated:

My intention was to create something distinctively different. Looking out my living room window in Detroit watching people go by gave me a new perspective. It made me look at the world within myself. And 25 years later I am still discovering.

Previously, Hood also reported that he had embraced the minimal sound evidenced on the record and its companions innately, further adding that the "chordy, organistic, really stripped down minimal sound" was "natural for me [him]."

== Critical reception ==
Professional ratings
Review scores
Source	Rating
AllMusic	4.5/5 stars
Spectrum Culture	4.5/5 stars

AllMusic's John Bush stated that the record "defines his [Hood's] minimalist manifesto, with a conventional four-four beat underpinning series of skeletal machine effects." Jake Cole of Spectrum Culture labeled the album as "perhaps the definitive moment of his [Hood's] career" and "watershed establishment of an electronic music so bare that it has ironically left enough space to explore, making it a still relevant subgenre." Cole also noted that "the sharper sonic clarity [of the record] only deepens one’s appreciation for the subtle density of Hood’s minimal sound." Resident Advisor's Lee Smith described Internal Empire as "truly the first techno record that deserved to be called 'minimal'."

== Tracklist ==
1994 CD version

1. "Intro" — 1:30
2. "Master Builder" — 3:32
3. "Parade" — 5:09
4. "Within" — 3:11
5. "Minus" — 5:24
6. "Internal Empire" — 3:25
7. "Home" — 7:32
8. "Multiple Silence" — 4:36
9. "Spirit Levels" — 5:06
10. "The Core" — 3:56
11. "Chase" — 5:59

1994 vinyl version

1. "Internal Empire"
2. "Minus"
3. "Within"
4. "Home"
5. "Rek"
6. "Chase"
7. "Spirit Levels"

== Credits ==
Album credits as adapted from 1994 CD liner notes:

- Robert Hood — music
- Constructure — design
