= Atonement (Final Cut album) =

Studio album by Final Cut
- Released: May 28, 1996
- Studio: Various: Moist and Funky Studio; (Detroit, Michigan); Warzone; (Chicago, Illinois)
- Genre: Industrial rock
- Length: 42:00
- Label: Fifth Colvmn
- Producer: John Bagguley; Julian Beeston; Steve White

Final Cut chronology
Consumed (1992)	Atonement (1996)	Grind (1998)

Alternative cover

Atonement is the third studio album by Final Cut, released on May 28, 1996 by Fifth Colvmn Records.

== Reception ==
Professional ratings
Review scores
Source	Rating
AllMusic	2.5/5 stars

Aiding & Abetting gave Atonement a positive review, saying "The Final Cut takes the best ideas of the world's finest industrial purveyors, adding a few new ideas just for the hell of it." AllMusic awarded the album two and a half out of five stars and said "while the results fit snugly into 1990s industrial territory, the record is also strongly influenced by the blaxploitation-styled guitar funk of the 1970s." Sonic Boom gave the album a mixed review, saying "musically this EP is all over the place. It ranges from the very traditional guitar, drums, bass of CSC to club remixes almost totally devoid of a guitar" and "If you are either a CSC or Meathead completist you will want to pick up this EP which has tracks that appear nowhere else."

== Track listing ==
All music is composed by Anthony Srock, Greg Lucas, VaN Christie and Jason McNinch.

No.	Title	Length
1.	"Terminate"	3:39
2.	"STD"	5:57
3.	"Dim"	5:47
4.	"It Comes Too"	4:38
5.	"Wallow"	6:04
6.	"The Shake"	4:55
7.	"Straddle"	5:16
8.	"Nothing at All"	5:44

== Personnel ==
Adapted from the Hands of Ash liner notes.

Additional performers

- Greg Lucas- guitars, samplers
- Martin Atkins – drums (1)
- Beth – backing vocals (6)
- Chris Connelly – vocals (8)
- Tyree Davis – percussion (2, 3)
- Dena – backing vocals (6)
- Taime Downe – guitar (2)
- Hobey Echlin – bass guitar (1)
- JC – vocals (2, 4, 5)
- Kurt Komraus – instruments
- Anthony Srock – mixing
- Louis Svitek – guitar (4, 5)
- Matt Warren – programming

Production and design

- Tom Baker – mastering
- Van Christie – engineering, mixing, editing
- Zalman Fishman – executive-producer
- Sean Joyce – assistant engineering
- Jim Marcus – engineering, typography, design
- Stephen Moore – assistant engineering
- Jason McNinch – editing
- Rex Ritter – photography
- Anthony Srock – mixing, editing

== Release history ==
Region	Date	Label	Format	Catalog
United States	1996	Fifth Colvmn	CD	9868-63223
United States	1998	Slipdisc	CD	008,633,124
