= Xeo-Genetic =

Studio album by Aux 88
- Released: February 16, 1999
- Genre: Electro
- Length: 62:58
- Label: Direct Beat
- Producer: Self-produced

Aux 88 chronology
Reprogramming The Machine	Xeo-Genetic	AUX 88

Xeo-Genetic is the fourth studio album by the electro group Aux 88. The album was nominated for the Detroit Music Awards.

== Track listing ==
1. Begin (Intro 1) 0:11
2. Welcome (Intro 2) 1:02
3. Play It Loud 5:17
4. The Light (Interlude) 0:48
5. Electric Light 5:25
6. Synthesizers 5:35
7. No Time (Episode) 2:35
8. I Hear Rhythms 6:05
9. Radio Waves 5:26
10. Don't Stop It 4:51
11. Xeo-Genetic 2:59
12. Just a Test (Interlude) 0:04
13. I Need to Find Myself 3:12
14. Rise of the Phoenix 6:02
15. Alien Contact (Interlude) 0:48
16. Computer Speaks 4:56
17. Hydro Spin (Episode) 1:12
18. Rhythm by Numbers 4:37
19. Completed (Outro 1) 0:32
20. Return (Outro 2) 0:07
