= James Stinson (musician) =

American techno musician (1969–2002)

- Born: James Marcel Stinson; September 14, 1969; Detroit, Michigan, U.S.
- Died: September 3, 2002 (aged 32) Newnan, Georgia, U.S.
- Genres: Detroit techno; electro
- Labels: Tresor; Warp; Rephlex; Clone
- Formerly of: Drexciya

James Marcel Stinson (September 14, 1969 – September 3, 2002) was an American techno musician from Detroit. Known for his work in the Detroit techno genre, he co-founded the Afrofuturist techno duo Drexciya with Gerald Donald in 1992. As a solo artist, he released music as The Other People Place and other aliases.

Stinson was regarded as one of the most well-known producers of techno and electro in the late 1990s and early 2000s. He was also credited as one of Detroit's most influential musicians of the 1990s and as a pioneer of Afrofuturism in electronic music.

== Biography ==
James Marcel Stinson was born in Detroit's East Side on September 14, 1969 to James and Helen Stinson. He graduated from Kettering High School in 1989. When not making music, Stinson held a job as a truck driver.

Stinson's first musical release was an EPs released in 1991 called Hyperspace Sound Lab under the alias Clarence G on the now-defunct Flourescent Sounds label. The following year, he formed Drexciya with Gerald Donald. The duo also released an EP that year under the name L.A.M., an acronym meaning Life After Mutation. Stinson was also a member of the Detroit-based Underground Resistance techno collective in the early 1990s. In 1995, Stinson and Donald formed a short-lived duo called Elecktroids. They released an EP that July followed by an album, Elektroworld, in August. Stinson played a key role in writing Drexciya’s complex science fiction world.

Following the success of Drexciya's debut album Neptune's Lair in 1999, he began releasing music more frequently under different aliases. His best known solo work, Lifestyles of the Laptop Café, was released by Warp on September 3, 2001, under his moniker of The Other People Place. The record, which features Stinson’s own vocals, was noted for its jazz and tech house influences and for its simplicity in sound and narrative in contrast to his work with Drexciya. It received little promotion upon release and soon went out of print. Following Stinson’s death and the subsequent confirmation that he had produced the album, it attracted growing interest from record collectors. Its 2017 vinyl reissue by Warp brought renewed attention to the album which led to broader recognition among electronic music fans and critics. Resident Advisor would call it “one of electronic music’s most essential records”.

Following the release of Lifestyles of the Laptop Café, he released an EP and album as Transllusion in November 2001. In early 2002, he released an album as Abstract Thought, as well as two more releases as Transllusion. Following these releases, he relocated to the Atlanta area seeking a warmer environment to help treat an undisclosed heart condition.

In Georgia, he began working on a new album under the alias Shifted Phases. This album, The Cosmic Memoirs of the Late Great Rupert J. Rosinthrope, was released by Tresor Records posthumously on October 1. A second posthumous release, Mice or Cyborg, was released by Clone Records in November 2003 under the alias Lab Rat X.

Stinson died on September 3, 2002, in Newnan, Georgia, at the age of 32 from complications of his heart condition. He was buried in Detroit. He was married to Andrea Stinson (née Clementson) and the couple had two children together.

He was a very private figure who was not confirmed as a member of Drexciya until after his death. In 2017, Clone Records released an EP called Laptop Cafe under the Jack Peoples moniker as part of their Aqualung series. The EP contained six previously unreleased songs from Lifestyles of the Laptop Café.

== Discography ==
=== Clarence G ===
==== EPs ====
- Hyperspace Sound Lab (1991), Flourescent Sound

=== The Other People Place ===
==== Studio albums ====
- Lifestyles of the Laptop Café (2001), Warp

=== Transllusion ===
==== Studio albums ====
- Opening of the Cerebral Gate (2001), Supremat
- L.I.F.E. (2002), Rephlex

==== EPs ====
- Mind Over Positive and Negative Dimensional Matter (2001), Supremat
- Third Eye (2002), Rephlex

=== Abstract Thought ===
==== Studio albums ====
- Hypothetical Situations (2002), Kombination Research

=== Shifted Phases ===
==== Studio albums ====
- The Cosmic Memoirs of the Late Great Rupert J. Rosinthrope (2002), Tresor

=== Lab Rat XL ===
==== Studio albums ====
- Mice or Cyborg (2003), Clone

=== Jack Peoples ===
==== EPs ====
- Laptop Cafe (2017), Clone

=== With Drexciya ===
==== Studio albums ====
- Neptune's Lair (1999), Tresor
- Harnessed the Storm (2002), Tresor
- Grava 4 (2002), Clone

==== Compilation albums ====
- The Quest (1997), Submerge
- Journey of the Deep Sea Dweller I (2011), Clone
- Journey of the Deep Sea Dweller II (2012), Clone
- Journey of the Deep Sea Dweller III (2013), Clone
- Journey of the Deep Sea Dweller IV (2013), Clone

==== EPs ====
- Deep Sea Dweller (1992), Shockwave Records
- Drexciya 2: Bubble Metropolis (1993), Underground Resistance
- Drexciya 3: Molecular Enhancement (1994), Rephlex, Submerge
- Drexciya 4: The Unknown Aquazone (1994), Submerge
- Aquatic Invasion (1994), Underground Resistance
- The Journey Home (1995), Warp
- The Return of Drexciya (1996), Underground Resistance
- Uncharted (1997), Somewhere in Detroit
- Hydro Doorways (2000), Tresor

==== Singles ====
- "Fusion Flats" (2000), Tresor
- "Digital Tsunami" (2001), Tresor
- "Drexciyan R.E.S.T. Principle" (2002), Clone

=== With L.A.M. ===
==== EPs ====
- Balance of Terror EP (1992), Hardwax

=== With Elecktroids ===
==== Studio Albums ====
- Elektroworld (1995), Warp

==== EPs ====
- Kilohertz (1995), Warp
