= Harnessed the Storm =

Album by Drexciya

Studio album by Drexciya
- Released: 2002
- Genre: Electro; techno; IDM
- Length: 58:30
- Label: Tresor

Drexciya chronology
Neptune's Lair (1999)	Harnessed the Storm (2002)	Grava 4 (2002)

Singles from Harnessed the Storm
- 1. "Digital Tsunami" Released: 2001

Harnessed the Storm is the second studio album by American electronic music duo Drexciya. It was released on Tresor in 2002. Designed as the first of seven conceptually linked albums that the duo produced over the course of a single year, it is the only one credited to Drexciya. Different aliases were used for the others.

== Music ==
The album's instrumentation has been said to incorporate "impossibly deep, depth charge bass and squawking lead synths."

== Critical reception ==
Professional ratings
Review scores
Source	Rating
AllMusic	4/5 stars
Alternative Press	8/10

Philip Downey of Exclaim! described Harnessed the Storm as "forward-looking, vocal-less, sci-fi stuff". Andy Battaglia of The A.V. Club felt that Drexciya "still creates some of the most visionary electro around", but concluded that the album's "Detroit-style formalism" sounds "too old-fashioned to sneak the future into the past".

In 2010, Resident Advisor placed Harnessed the Storm at number 97 on its list of the "Top 100 Albums of the 2000s". In 2017, Pitchfork placed it at number 11 on its list of "The 50 Best IDM Albums of All Time". Staff writer Mark Richardson wrote: "Harnessed the Storm wasn’t completely in sync with what was happening in IDM at the time of its release—for one thing, Donald and Stinson preferred old-school synths and sequencers to computers. But its adventurous spirit, disorienting layers of rhythm, and sheer beauty make it a natural fit with the other albums on this list."

== Track listing ==
Vinyl edition
No.	Title	Length
1.	"Digital Tsunami"	6:22
2.	"Soul of the Sea"	4:32
3.	"Dr. Blowfins' Black Storm Stabilizing Spheres"	6:13
4.	"Song of the Green Whale"	5:00
5.	"Lake Haze"	5:18
6.	"Mission to Ociya Syndor and Back"	5:14
7.	"Under Sea Disturbances"	8:08

CD edition
No.	Title	Length
1.	"Under Sea Disturbances"	8:08
2.	"Digital Tsunami"	6:22
3.	"Soul of the Sea"	4:32
4.	"Song of the Green Whale"	5:00
5.	"Dr. Blowfins' Black Storm Stabilizing Spheres"	6:13
6.	"The Plankton Organization"	6:09
7.	"Mission to Ociya Syndor and Back"	5:14
8.	"Aquatic Cataclysm"	5:19
9.	"Lake Haze"	5:18
10.	"Birth of New Life"	6:23
