= Robert Hood =

American electronic music producer and DJ

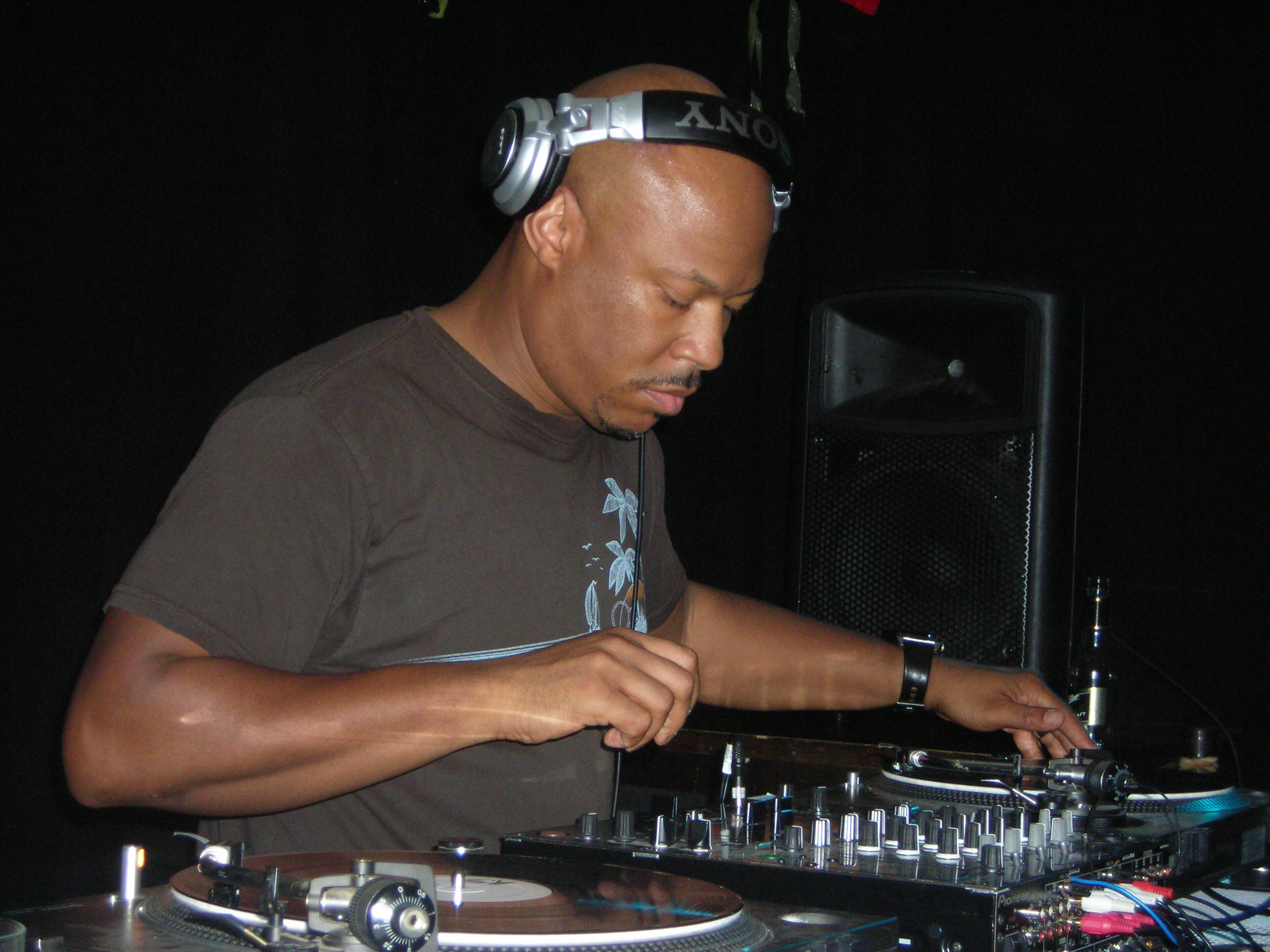
- Hood performing in 2009

Background information
- Also known as: Monobox, The Vision, Inner Sanctum, Floorplan, Mathematic Assassins, Robert Noise
- Born: 1965 (age 60–61)
- Origin: Detroit, Michigan, U.S.
- Genres: Techno, minimal techno
- Occupations: Musician, DJ, producer
- Years active: 1990–present
- Labels: M-Plant, Metroplex, Axis, Peacefrog
- Spouses: Alexandra Schmidt (m. 1995; died 1999); Gail Spring (m. 2003)

Robert Hood (born 1965) is an American electronic music producer and DJ. He is a founding member of the group Underground Resistance as a 'Minister of Information' with Mad Mike Banks and Jeff Mills. He is often considered to be one of the founders of minimal techno. In 1994, Hood founded the minimal techno label M-Plant in Detroit.

== Biography ==
=== Underground Resistance ===
Hood was a member of Underground Resistance, a techno collective started by Jeff Mills and former Parliament bass player 'Mad' Mike Banks. The group embraced militant, revolutionary rhetoric, and only appeared in public dressed in ski masks and black combat suits.

=== Solo work and independent label ===
In 1992, Hood left Detroit and Underground Resistance with Jeff Mills to create a series of recordings both as H&M and X-103. In 1994, Hood founded minimal techno label M-Plant releasing the album Minimal Nation, which is considered the inspiration for the minimal techno genre.

=== Gospel-era ===
Hood was inspired to incorporate gospel music with house music, disco and techno music. The first gospel-inspired track "We Magnify His Name" was launched under the Floorplan project. In 2016 Floorplan expanded to include Hood's daughter, Lyric Hood.

== Discography ==
=== Releases ===
Robert Hood has released music under his own name, Monobox, Inner Sanctum, The Vision and other aliases. When recording with Jeff Mills, he used the alias H&M. Floorplan is a collaboration with his daughter Lyric Hood.

==== As Robert Hood ====
- Robert Hood - Sophisticcato, 12-inch (Duet)
- Robert Hood - The Grey Area, 12-inch (M-Plant)
- Robert Hood - Spectra, 12-inch (M-Plant)
- Robert Hood - Red Passion III, 12-inch (Duet)
- Robert Hood - Addict, 12-inch (M-Plant)
- Robert Hood - Internal Empire, CD (Tresor)
- Robert Hood - The Protein Valve, 12-inch (M-Plant)
- Robert Hood - Internal Empire, CD (Tresor)
- Robert Hood - The Pace, 12-inch (M-Plant)
- Robert Hood - Master Builder, 12-inch (Tresor)
- Robert Hood - Minimal Nation Misspress, 2x12-inch (Axis)
- Robert Hood - Minimal Nation, 2x12-inch (Axis)
- Robert Hood - Internal Empire, 12-inch (M-Plant)
- Robert Hood - Internal Empire, 2x12-inch (Tresor)
- Robert Hood - Internal Empire, CD (Logic Records)
- Robert Hood - Nighttime World Volume 1, CD (Cheap)
- Robert Hood - Nighttime World Vol. 1, 2x12-inch (Cheap)
- Robert Hood - Moveable Parts Chapter 1, 12-inch (M-Plant)
- Robert Hood - Master Builder, CD5" (BMG)
- Robert Hood - Minimal Nation, 2x12-inch (M-Plant)
- Robert Hood - The Vision, 12-inch (Metroplex)
- Robert Hood - Underestimated, 12-inch (M-Plant)
- Robert Hood - Moveable Parts Chapter 2, 2x12-inch (M-Plant)
- Robert Hood - All Day Long, 12-inch (M-Plant)
- Robert Hood - Hoodlum, 2x12-inch (Drama)
- Robert Hood - Psychic / Pole Position, 12-inch (M-Plant)
- Robert Hood - Stereotype, 12-inch (M-Plant)
- Robert Hood - Red Passion II, 12-inch (Duet)
- Robert Hood - Satellite - A Force Of One, 12-inch (Hardwax)
- Robert Hood - Internal Empire, 2x12-inch (Tresor)
- Robert Hood - Technatural EP, 12-inch (M-Plant)
- Robert Hood - Red Passion I, 12-inch (Duet)
- Robert Hood - Nighttime World Volume 2, CD (M-Plant)
- Robert Hood - Nighttime World Volume 2, 3x12-inch (M-Plant)
- Robert Hood - Apartment Zero, 12-inch (Logistic Records)
- Robert Hood - Invincible, 12-inch (M-Plant)
- Robert Hood - The Greatest Dancer, 12-inch (M-Plant)
- Robert Hood - The Deal, 12-inch (Duet)
- Robert Hood - Master Builder, 12-inch (Tresor)
- Robert Hood - Who Taught You Math, 12-inch (Peacefrog)
- Robert Hood - The Metronome, 12-inch (M-Plant)
- Robert Hood - Monobox EP, 12-inch (Logistic Records)
- Robert Hood - Point Black, 2x12-inch (Peacefrog)
- Robert Hood - Point Black, CD (Peacefrog)
- Robert Hood - The Art Of War, 2x12-inch (Peacefrog)
- Robert Hood - Kick Dirt E.p, 12-inch (M-Plant)
- Robert Hood - The Black & White E.p, 12-inch (M-Plant)
- Robert Hood - "i", 12-inch (M-Plant)
- Robert Hood - Untitled 5, 12-inch (M-Plant)
- Robert Hood presents HoodMusic Vol 1, 12-inch (Music Man)
- Robert Hood presents HoodMusic Vol 2, 12-inch (Music Man)
- Robert Hood presents HoodMusic Vol 3, 12-inch (Music Man)
- Robert Hood - Shonky In The Hood EP, 12-inch (Freak n' Chic)
- Robert Hood – Superman / Range, 12-inch (M-Plant)

==== As Monobox ====
- Monobox - Realm (12-inch) (M-Plant)
- Monobox - Downtown (12-inch) (M-Plant)
- Monobox - Population (12-inch) (M-Plant)
- Monobox - Molecule (12-inch) (Logistic)
- Monobox - Molecule (LP/CD) (Logistic)
- Monobox - Regenerate (LP/Digital) (M-Plant)

==== As H&M with Jeff Mills ====
- H&M - Tranquilizer EP, 12-inch (Axis)
- H&M - Tranquilizer EP, 12-inch (Network)
- H&M - Drama EP, 12-inch (Axis)

==== As The Vision ====
- The Vision - Gyroscopic EP, 12-inch (Underground Resistance)
- The Vision - Toxin 12 EP, 12-inch (Hardwax)
- The Vision - Waveform Transmission Vol. 2, 2x12-inch (Tresor)
- The Vision - Spectral Nomad, 12-inch (Metroplex)
- The Vision - The Vision, 12-inch (Hardwax)
- The Vision - Other Side Of Life, 12-inch (Interface Records)
- The Vision - Laidback & Groovy, 12-inch (Nu Groove)

==== As inner sanctum ====
- Inner Sanctum - Inner Sanctum, 12-inch (Axis)

==== As FLOORPLAN (w/ Lyric Hood) ====
- Floorplan - Funky Souls (12-inch) (Drama)
- Floorplan - Doin' My Thing EP (12-inch) (Drama)
- Floorplan - Envy (12-inch) (Drama)
- Floorplan - Come On Rock / Burner (12-inch) (Drama)
- Floorplan - On The Case (12-inch) (Duet)
- Floorplan - Shop / Learn (12-inch) (Duet)
- Floorplan - Living It Up / Wall To Wall (12-inch) (M-Plant)
- Floorplan - Sanctified EP (12-inch) (M-Plant)
- Floorplan - Paradise (LP/CD) (M-Plant)
- Floorplan - Victorious (LP/CD) (M-Plant)

==== As Mathematic Assassins ====
- The Mathematic Assassins - Calculator (12-inch) (Hardwax)

==== As Missing Channel (w/ Claude Young) ====
- Missing Channel - Atomic Whirlpool, 12-inch (Hardwax)
- Missing Channel - Onslaught, 12-inch (Hardwax)
- Missing Channel - Submerged, 12-inch (Hardwax)

==== As X-101 (w/ Mad Mike & Jeff Mills) ====
- X-101 "Sonic Destroyer" (U.R)
- X-101 "Whatever Happened To Peace" (U.R)
- X-101 "X-101" (Tresor)

==== As X-102 (w/ Mad Mike & Jeff Mills) ====
- X-102 "Discovers The Rings Of Saturn" (Tresor)
- X-102 "OBX-A" (U.R)

==== As X-103 (w/ Jeff Mills) ====
- X-103 - Thera, 12-inch (Axis)
- X-103 - Atlantis, CD (Tresor)
- X-103 - Atlantis, 2x12-inch (Tresor)
- X-103 - Thera EP, 12-inch (Tresor)
- X-103 - Tephra EP, 12-inch (Axis)

=== Remixes ===
- Ian Pooley - My Anthem (Force Inc.) 1995
- DBX "Losing Control" (Peacefrog)
- Dave Clarke " Wisdom To The Wise/ Red 2" (Deconstruction)
- Diego "Mind Detergent" (Kanzleramt)
- Turner "When Will We Leave" (Ladomat)
- Oliver Ho "Changing" (Meta)
- Allen Gamble "Militant" (Fusion Technology Records "FTR") - 2003
- Allen Gamble "Your Mind is Mind" Monobox Mix - (Fusion Technology Records "FTR") - 2005
- The Black Dog (Soma) - 2008
- Marc Romboy "The Beat" (Systematica) - 2009
- Detroit Grand Pubahs "Funk all Y'all" (Detelefunk) - 2009
- Ben Klock "Goodly Sin" (Ostgut Ton) - 2009
- Youandme "Close To Me" (Ornaments) - 2010
- Aufgang "Barock" (Infine) - 2010
- Juju & Jordash "Deep Blue Manies" (Dekmantel) - 2010
- Boys Noize "Trooper" (BNR) - 2010
- Roel Salemink "Silenth Noises" (BulletDodge) - 2010
- O/V/R "Post Traumatic Son" (Blueprint) - 2011
- DJ 3000 "Hotel Oasiz" (Motech) - 2011
- TommyFourSeven (CLR) - 2011
- Orlando Voorn "Phuture" (Underground Liberation) - 2011
- Carl Taylor - Debbie's Groove (EPM) - 2012

=== Mix CDs ===
- "Caught In The Act" (Logistic)
- Fabric 039: Robert Hood – March 2008
- "Deep Concentration: The Grey Area mix" - December 2008
- DJ Kicks: Robert Hood - !K7 Records - November 2018
