= Santiago Salazar (musician) =

Chicano DJ

- Born: Bassett, California
- Genres: Techno
- Occupations: Musician; record producer; DJ
- Years active: early 90s-present
- Labels: Love What You Feel, Planet E Communications, Rush Hour, Seventh Sign Recordings, In The Machine Age, River Rapid

Santiago Salazar a.k.a. DJ S² is a Chicano DJ in Los Angeles who began his career in the underground dance music scene in the early 90s. Salazar was invited to Underground Resistance in Detroit by Mike Banks, where he stayed from 2002 to 2006. He released his debut album Chicanismo in 2015 and received positive reviews for subsequent albums and EPs.

== Personal life ==
Salazar grew up in Bassett, California, a Latino suburb near La Puente about twenty miles from Downtown Los Angeles, where he was influenced by the sounds of Italo disco, cumbia, high-energy rap music, R&B, funk, and hi-NRG disco. Later, he was influenced by house and techno music, inspired by mixtapes his brother would bring home from the gay underground scene in Los Angeles, particularly by X–102's "The Rings Of Saturn" and "Big Fun" by Inner City. He remarks that he grew up on KDEY and Power 106 radio, where he became influenced by DJs such as David Alvarado.

For Salazar, growing up in Bassett was "kind of like living in fear ... a couple of my friends got shot, there was a local gang there. I was the first kid from my whole block to graduate." He experienced police harassment and violence while working in Los Angeles. He has played at high-profile clubs, yet chooses to keep a low-profile, working as a custodian as a side job. Salazar has been described as someone who knows their roots and respects them. A short documentary on Salazar's life was made in 2015 called Santiago's Theme by director Alvaro Parra and Heyjin Jun.

== Career ==
Salazar first started playing as a DJ at after-hours clubs in Los Angeles, including the Beverly Room, the Studio and Graveyard Shift. He relocated in Detroit in 2002, learning about music production from Mike Banks of Underground Resistance. Banks, who was interested in using music for the betterment of minority neighborhoods, took note of Salazar and invited him to Detroit. Salazar initially worked at Submerge distribution and was eventually signed to Underground Resistance, associated with its offshoots Los Hermanos and Galaxy 2 Galaxy. He toured Japan as part of Marc Floyd's Chaos project. Salazar returned to L.A. in 2006 and founded labels Major People, Ican (as in Mex-Ican, with Esteban Adame) and Historia y Violencia (with Juan Mendez a.k.a. Silent Servant).

In 2015, Salazar released his debut studio album Chicanismo, influenced by Detroit techno and Latin music. Salazar stated that growing up as a Chicano was important to shaping the sound of the album: “I think [the album] stands out from the modern style of techno. Everybody is making their stuff really cold, with a technical aspect to their project. I wanted to give my first album a Chicano feel.” "Mama Paz," a track dedicated to Salazar's mother, was selected as a standout by NPR: "It's the kind of small-a anthem that can unite a diverse dance-floor, and the kind of music that both Salazar's mom and his musical elders in Detroit and Los Angeles can be proud to have fostered."

Salazar released his second album Aspirations for Young Xol in 2017 and The Night Owl in 2019, which received positive reviews. In an interview for 5 Magazine, Salazar noted that he released Aspirations to help pay for his son's schooling and that "everything I’m doing is focused on his wellbeing ... I see this as my way of showing him that you can do good with art and music." He connects this with Chicano identity: "So I guess there is a Chicano aspect of just trying to make it, you know?" He played at major nightclubs such as Berghain and Fabric as well as festivals like DEMF. Salazar's 2019 EP RR002 ("Piano Adjacent"’/"Cosmic Powwow") for River Rapid received positive reviews and was described as a "key release" for the label by DJ Mag.

== Discography ==
Studio Albums

- Chicanismo (2015)
- Aspirations for Young Xol (2017)
- The Night Owl (2019)
- Cloud Iridescence LP (2019)
- 1998 (2020)

Singles / Extended Plays

- Tzolkin / Kawak (2005) w/ DJ Dex
- Gjeloshaj 1862 (2007) w/ DJ 3000
- Santuario / Lo Profundo (2008) w/ Silent Servant
- Materia Oscura (2008)
- Arcade (2009)
- La Noche / La Minoria (2009) w/ Silent Servant
- Your Club Went Hollywood (2010)
- La Soledad / Caja De Luz (2011) w/ David Alvarado
- Izalco / Retiro (2011) w/ Roque Hernandez
- Smile Now, Cry Later (2011)
- Mi Alma / Corazon (2012) w/ Silent Servant
- Rise EP (2012)
- New Beginnings EP (2013)
- Departure EP (2014)
- Galactic Stomp EP (2014)
- EP2002 (2018)
- Angeleno EP (2018) w/ Esteban Adame
- RR002 (2019)

Compilations

- H&V 001+002+003 (2009) w/ Silent Servant
