= Hiroshi Watanabe =

Hiroshi Watanabe may refer to:

- Hiroshi Watanabe (animator) (わたなべ ひろし), Japanese animation director
- Hiroshi Watanabe (equestrian) (渡辺 弘; born 1947), Japanese equestrian
- Hiroshi Watanabe (photographer) (渡邉 博史; born 1951), Japanese photographer
- Hiroshi Watanabe (weightlifter) (渡辺 博; born 1967), Japanese weightlifter
