= Minimal Nation =

- Original 1994 LP

Studio album by Robert Hood
- Released: 1994
- Genre: Techno; minimal techno; psychedelic
- Length: 35:54
- Label: Axis
- Producer: Robert Hood

Robert Hood chronology
Internal Empire EP (1994)	Minimal Nation (1994)	Internal Empire (1994)

Minimal Nation is an album by American electronic musician Robert Hood. Released in 1994 through Jeff Mills' Axis Records label, it is considered a landmark release in the techno genre and one of the minimal techno's key founding documents.

A restored and remasterered reissue of the album, featuring several tracks that were originally left off, was released in 2009. A triple LP reissue was also released on Hood's own record label, M-Plan, in 2015.

== Background and music ==
Fact magazine critic Marcus Scott stated that each track on the record "consists of rolling riffs that stammer and bounce across the metronomic rhythm, breaking the momentum with tiny synapse snapping manipulations. According to Wondering Sound critic Philip Sherburne, the album "rendered the familiar thump and squelch of Detroit techno even stranger, subtracting all remaining traces of disco and R&B and imagining rhythm as a kind of chattering conversation between sentient machines." It also features traces of jazz, "with the clash of fixed-interval chords undercutting conventional key signatures."

According to Hood, he developed Minimal Nation's sound after coming across a chord sound on a Roland Juno 2 keyboard and "realizing that he didn't need anything else other than the chord sound and a particular pattern". He has cited the bleakness of the music as a reflection of his hometown, Detroit. He also reflected to its nature as a "a protest record", stating:

"Nobody seems to get that [the record]. Techno was becoming one huge sample and the raves were becoming all about drugs... Minimalism is not going to stop, because it’s a direct reflection of the way the world is going. We’re stripping down and realising that we need to focus on what’s essential in our lives."

== Reception and legacy ==
Professional ratings
Review scores
Source	Rating
Fact	9/10

In an introspective review, Marcus Scott of Fact magazine praised the album, described it "as direct as psychedelic music gets". Scott also wrote that the record "sounds like punk compared to what minimal means in 2009: a vision of hedonistic, wasted bohemian youth listening to gentle, anodyne prog-rock length tracks." XLR8R's AJ Calzada regarded the album's tracks as the "most important tracks in techno music; it’s [sic] title becoming the very blueprint for a new generation of machine-funk makers, warehouse movers, and minimal techno worshippers."

Fact magazine also listed the album as number 53 on its list of "The 100 Best Albums of the 1990s".

== Track listing ==
=== Original LP version ===
1. "One Touch" – 3:58
2. "Museum" – 5:12
3. "Ride" – 4:16
4. "Acrylic" – 3:54
5. "Unix" – 3:14
6. "Rhythm" – 5:04
7. "Station Rider E" – 4:36
8. "The Pace" – 5:40

=== Reissue ===
1. "One Touch"
2. "Museum"
3. "SH.101"
4. "Rhythm of Vision"
5. "Unix"
6. "Ride"
7. "Station Rider E"
8. "Self Powered"
9. "Sleep Cycle"
10. "Rhythm of Vision (Original)"

=== Bonus CD ===
1. "One Touch
2. "Museum"
3. "SH.101"
4. "Rhythm of Vision"
5. "Unix"
6. "Ride"
7. "Station Rider E"
8. "Self Powered"
9. "Sleep Cycle"
10. "Rhythm of Vision (Original)"
