= AUX 88 =

AUX-88
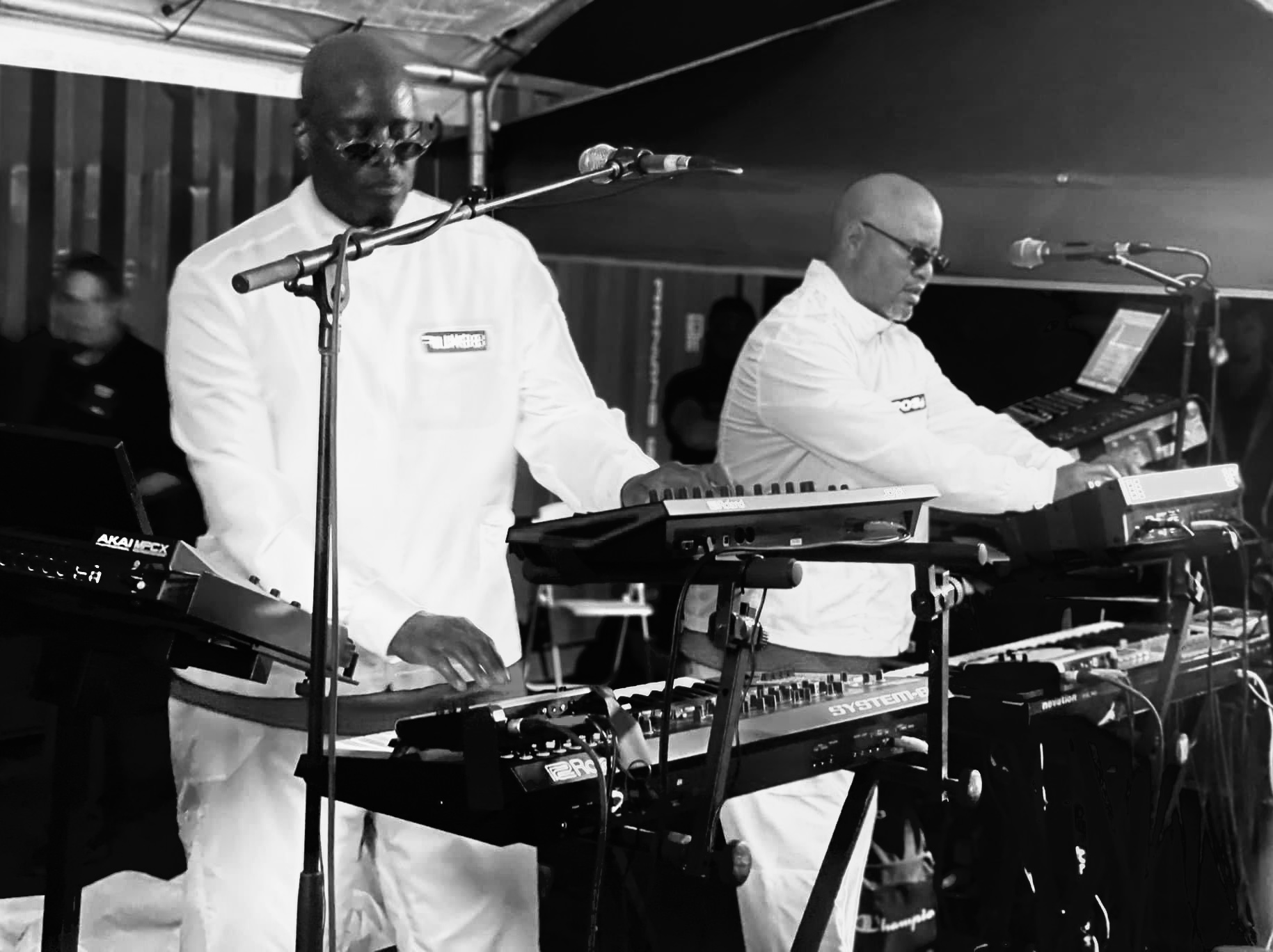
- AUX 88Live

Background information
- Origin: Detroit, Michigan, U.S.
- Genres: Electro
- Instruments: Vocals; synthesizer; drum machine
- Years active: 1993–present
- Labels: Direct Beat; Puzzlebox

From the eastside of Detroit Michigan, AUX88 is an electronic band composed of the duo TOMTOM (Tommy Hamilton) and POSATRONIX (William “BJ” Smith). The group originally included members Keith Tucker and Anthony Horton, who left the group to pursue other opportunities.

AUX88 has released numerous records, primarily on 430 West and Direct Beat Records, including “Direct Drive,” “My Aux Mind,” “I Need to Freak,” “Shake it” and “Play it Loud.” Their debut album “Bass Magnetic” was released in 1993, followed by “Is It Man or Machine?” in 1996. From 1999 to 2005, AUX88 would go on to release a CD in the “Electro Boogie’’ series of mixed albums, their self-titled, third album “AUX88,””Xeo-Genetic,” ”Black Tokyo’’ and “Mad Scientist.”

AUX88 contributed to Detroit techno as well as to the global electronic music scene. As recognition for their contributions, AUX88 won two Detroit Music Awards in 1999 for “Outstanding Electronic/ Dance Artist/Group” and “Outstanding Electronic/Dance Recording” for “Play It Loud,” as well as being awarded with a Spirit of Detroit Award in 2022.

== Discography ==
- 1993: Bass Magnetic
- 1996: Is It Man or Machine?
- 1998: Reprogramming The Machine
- 1998: Xeo-Genetic
- 2005: AUX 88
- 2009: Mad Scientist
- 2010: Aux 88 Presents Black Tokyo
- 2020: Counterparts
