= Drexciya =

American musical group

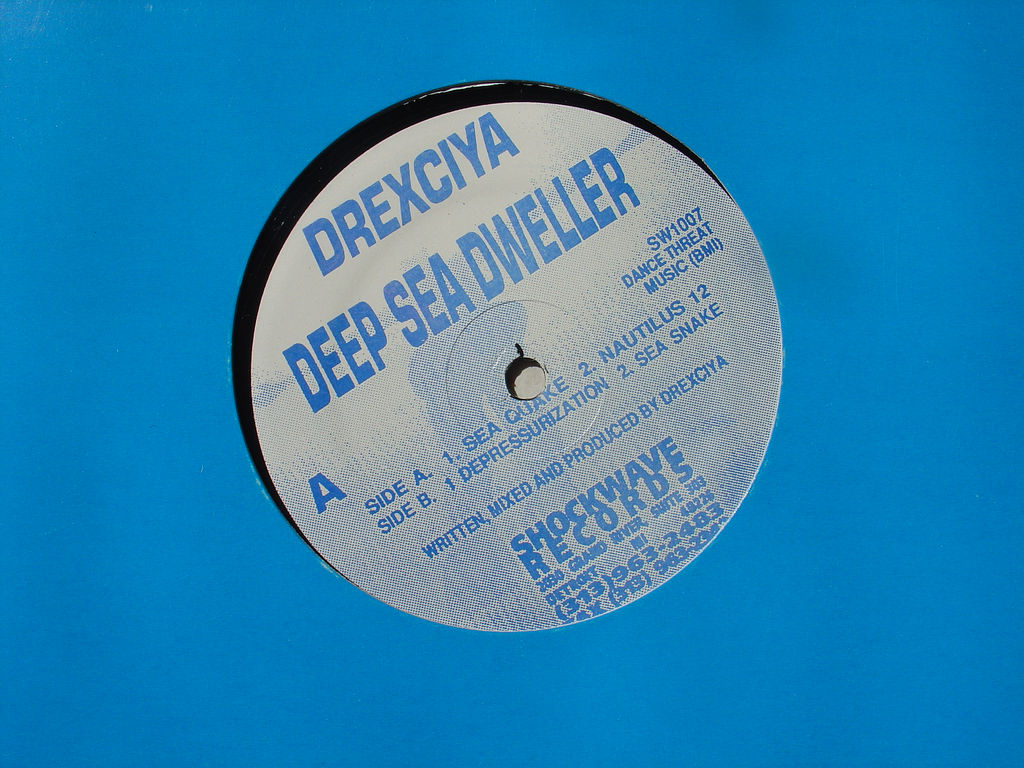
- Deep Sea Dweller (1992), Shockwave Records

Background information
- Origin: Detroit, Michigan, U.S.
- Genres: Detroit techno; electro
- Years active: 1992–2002
- Labels: Underground Resistance; Tresor; Rephlex; Submerge Records; Clone Records
- Past members: James Stinson; Gerald Donald

Drexciya was an American electronic music duo from Detroit, Michigan, consisting of James Stinson (1969–2002) and Gerald Donald.

== Career ==
The majority of Drexciya's releases were dancefloor-oriented electro, punctuated with elements of retro and 1980s Detroit techno, with occasional excursions into the ambient and industrial genres. They had 3 releases on the highly influential Underground Resistance Detroit record label. Tracks were mostly centered around the Roland TR-808 drum machine, Roland D-20 synthesizer, Casio CZ-5000, Kawai K1 synthesizer, Korg Mono/Poly synthesizer, and Roland TR-909 drum machine.

Drexciya's music was mechanical and fluid, filled with underwater and aquatic noises. In an interview highlighting Drexciya's music and history, according to Mike Rubin, “To the standard electro palette of analog synths and 808s, Drexciya added a bubbly variety of wet-sounding keyboard lines, plus echoey sonar pings, depth charges and diving sounds.” Drexciya's music had an alien-like feel to it with the artwork reflecting the feeling of the music.

In the early 1990s, the idea of ecocriticism was starting to rise. Drexciya was one of the leading experts in this area and made it very popular amongst techno and other music genres. Drexciya's highlighted the oceanic myths alien-like cover art with their music in a revolutionary way that still today artists try and replicate.

Drexciya's music pertained to myth and legend, but was also about spreading awareness of ethical treatment, especially with African Americans. Drexciya highlighted the mistreatment of the African Americans in history and wanted the Detroit duo's music to bring light in an artistic way to a historical problem. Drexciya did this by telling stories and transferring information within the duo's art and music.

In 1997, Drexciya released a compilation album, titled The Quest. The duo released three studio albums: Neptune's Lair (1999), Harnessed the Storm (2002), and Grava 4 (2002). Drexciya's music was so well received that in 1999 Neptune's Lair received the "Dance CD of the week" award by CD reviews.

Drexciya, which eschewed media attention and its attendant focus on personality, developed around a nautical afrofuturist myth. The group revealed in the sleeve notes to their 1997 album The Quest that "Drexciya" was an underwater country populated by the unborn children of pregnant African women who were thrown off of slave ships; the babies had adapted to breathe underwater in their mothers' wombs. The myth was built partly on Paul Gilroy's The Black Atlantic: Modernity and Double Consciousness (1993), according to Kodwo Eshun.

All of Drexciya's music and artwork reflected the myth by showing the alien and aquatic feelings commonly associated with the music. The artwork brought attention to Afrofuturism and African American culture, especially in the Detroit area.

Stinson died suddenly on September 3, 2002, of a heart condition. Gerald Donald continues to produce music as part of the groups Dopplereffekt, Der Zyklus, Elecktroids, NRSB-11, Daughter Produkt and under other monikers such as XOR Gate, Arpanet, Japanese Telecom, Glass Domain and more.

== Legacy ==
in 2011 a documentary was written on struggling community in Ghana, what was once a booming city of tourism now is collapsing, the documentary had an afro-futurism motive that was inspired from the works of the Drexciya techno music group.

In 2019, with support from Gerald Donald and Helen Stinson, the mother of James Stinson, visual artist Abu Qadim Haqq created The Book of Drexciya, Volume I (and later The Book of Drexciya, Volume II in 2021), which was inspired by the mythos of Drexciya's work. The books chronicle the origins of Drexciya and the rise of their first ruler, Drexaha.

Also in 2019, industrial hip-hop group Clipping cited Drexciya and their mythology as an influence to their 2017 song, The Deep.

In 2023, "From the Deep: In the Wake of Drexciya", a multimedia exhibition by American photographer and contemporary artist Ayana V. Jackson opened at the National Museum of African Art. The exhibit took inspiration from the founding myth of Drexciya and directly featured music by the group. The exhibition which concluded in January 2025, is one of several exhibitions labeled as "anti-American propaganda” by US President Donald Trump's administration.

== Discography ==
=== Studio albums ===
- Neptune's Lair (1999), Tresor
- Harnessed the Storm (2002), Tresor
- Grava 4 (2002), Clone

=== Compilation albums ===
- The Quest (1997), Submerge
- Journey of the Deep Sea Dweller I (2011), Clone
- Journey of the Deep Sea Dweller II (2012), Clone
- Journey of the Deep Sea Dweller III (2013), Clone
- Journey of the Deep Sea Dweller IV (2013), Clone

=== EPs ===
- Deep Sea Dweller (1992), Shockwave Records
- Drexciya 2: Bubble Metropolis (1993), Underground Resistance
- Drexciya 3: Molecular Enhancement (1994), Rephlex, Submerge
- Drexciya 4: The Unknown Aquazone (1994), Submerge
- Aquatic Invasion (1994), Underground Resistance
- The Journey Home (1995), Warp Records
- The Return of Drexciya (1996), Underground Resistance
- Uncharted (1997), Somewhere in Detroit
- Hydro Doorways (2000), Tresor

=== Singles ===
- "Fusion Flats" (2000), Tresor
- "Digital Tsunami" (2001), Tresor
- "Drexciyan R.E.S.T. Principle" (2002), Clone
