= Underground Resistance =

American techno musical collective

Background information
- Origin: Detroit, Michigan, U.S.
- Genres: Detroit techno, electro, acid techno
- Years active: 1989–present
- Labels: Underground Resistance, Somewhere in Detroit (SID)
- Members: Mike Banks, Andre Holland, Billebob, Chuck Gibson, Cornelius Harris, Dan Caballero, Buzz Goree, Frankie Fultz, Gerald Mitchell, Ghetto Tech, ISH, James Pennington, Marc Floyd, Mark Flash, Mark Taylor, Mike Clark, Milton Baldwin, Raphael Merriweathers Jr., Santiago Salazar, De'Sean Jones, Jon Dixon, Esteban Adame, Gerardo Cedillo, Emanuel Cedillo
- Past members: Jeff Mills, Robert Hood, DJ Rolando, Gerald Donald, James Stinson
- Website: www.undergroundresistance.com

Underground Resistance (commonly abbreviated to UR) is an American musical collective from Detroit, Michigan. Producing primarily Detroit techno since 1990, they are also renowned for their militant political and anti-corporate ethos.

== History ==
First formed in 1989 by "Mad" Mike Banks and Jeff Mills, UR related the aesthetics of early Detroit techno to the social, political, and economic circumstances which followed on from Reagan-era inner-city economic recession, producing uncompromising music geared toward promoting awareness and facilitating political change. In contrast to techno that preceded UR, UR tried to appeal to lower class African Americans in Detroit. UR's tracks created a sense of self-exploration, experimentation and the ability to change yourself and circumstances. Additionally, UR wanted to establish a means of identification beyond traditional lines of race and ethnicity. By targeting lower class African Americans, UR intended to inspire black men to get out of the poverty cycle in the city. Their mission was to return techno music to the underground: underground not meaning experimental and unpopular music, but rather a deliberate effort to create sonic communities on the periphery of mainstream culture as resistance against the socio-economic racial hierarchies. It was about providing new ways for lower class African Americans to form their identities. The Underground Resistance's politics extended to providing alternative identities to inner city African American youth, other than the hyper-masculine, hard and violent identities existing within the city. This was a gendered group, however, and the UR focused their attention on young black men. Another form of UR's rebellion concerns the rejection of the commercialization of techno. This is evident in the messages scratched in UR vinyl, lyrics and sounds expressing economic independence from major record labels.

Jeff Mills was already an established technical DJ who came from a background of "industrial music", which was punchy, rigid, and influenced by European rock n roll with hubs in Belgium and Chicago. Mills was heavily influenced by the sound of groups like Belgium-based Front 242, and formed the group Final Cut in 1989 with Tony Srock for Paragon Records. After a falling out with producer Jerry Capaldi involving unequal power dynamics between the white suburban executives and the Black musicians, Final Cut left the label. Mills also left Final Cut in 1990, after which he joined Banks, whom he knew from early sessions at Paragon. Banks was also working on funk and house-inspired projects with the group "Members of the House." At this time, Robert Hood was going by Robert Noise, and created artwork for the group's 1987 LP. Banks had also previously been a part of a group called "the Mechanics," which sometimes covered Kraftwerk's songs live, again demonstrating the shift in the popularity of electric music from the house scene in Chicago to white artists and the European market. The goal of Underground Resistance would be to bring these sounds back to the communities that created them.

As Underground Resistance, Banks and Mills tried to get Juan Atkins of The Belleville Three and Cybotron to release their first record on his Metroplex label but he did not end up getting to the record quickly enough. The duo ended up releasing the record themselves, establishing their ethos for independent music releases, describing their sound as a "rumor in the music." The group attempted to merge the sounds of both Final Cut and Members of the House on their first track The Theory, but really came into their sound by the fourth release, Waveform (1991). Their sound was informed by their lived realities as well as the music scene at the time, namely the "Reagan era of inner-city economic recession" that particularly affected Detroit, along with the longstanding racial relations of the country that led to the rise and collapse of the Black Panther Party. Their ethos consists of Afro-futurist and anti-corporate sentiments that center the self-fashioning of their own image and control of their production and distribution.

Their move against forces destroying their communities included a rejection of hedonism and the image of techno as drug music. They also have a persona that emphasizes anonymity to push back against the profiling of Black DJs, performing wearing balaclavas and touting the nondescript "UR" logo. This move was meant to work against the idea of the "superstar DJ," emphasizing the mission of the music as a communal project. This anonymity is emphasized by the legion of artists that cycle through the collective, notably including Gerald Mitchell, DJ Rolando, and James Stinson of Drexciya.

In response to the economic reality of Black Detroiters at the time, Underground Resistance became involved with Submerge, a "supportive economic community" of labels and musicians but also lawyers and financial experts that allowed musicians to experiment with a financial safety net.

As with Public Enemy, there have been intimations that UR's subversively 'militant' approach to music was related to the activities of the Black Panthers in the 1970s. In a 2006 interview, Mills responds to that claim: "All the black men you see in America today are the direct result of those actions: all the freedoms we have, as well as the restrictions, refer back to the government and the Black Panthers in the '70s". Mills continues: "So we make music. We make music about who we are and where we’re from. Of course there are going to be links – that's why we had songs with titles like Riot. Because that's indicative of the era we were born in, and the things we remember. As time goes on, naturally I think the messages will get further away from that. It's not a coincidence. There is a reason behind UR and Public Enemy and these people."

Many of UR's earliest output would be the product of various experiments by Banks, Mills, and Hood – both solo and in collaboration. "The Theory" and "Eye Of The Storm" (Sonic EP) were among the two earliest UR tracks to be released in 1990, followed by a stream of EPs and singles including "Riot", "Acid Rain", and "Jupiter Jazz". From Submerge came the Underground Resistance side projects X-101 and X-102. Under the aliases X-101 and X-102, the trio released both EPs such as "Sonic Destroyer" and "Groundzero (The Planet)" and the albums "X-101" and "X-102 Discovers The Rings of Saturn".

When Mills and Hood moved on from the collective in 1992 to achieve international success as solo artists and DJs, Banks continued to lead UR releasing EPs during the mid-1990s such as "Return of Acid Rain", "Message to the Majors", and excursions into Nu Jazz on "Hi-Tech Jazz" as Galaxy 2 Galaxy. Increasingly acclaimed artists such as DJ Rolando, Suburban Knight, and Drexciya also joined the collective.

"Message to the Majors", released in 1992, saw UR in full opposition to the music industry and the commercialization of Techno. In the album notes, the collective writes, "Message to all murderers on the Detroit Police Force -- We'll see you in hell." What's made clear by this oppositional rhetorics is that UR's "commitment to metropolitan politics and the criticism of its racist dimension seem to be at least equally important." In fact, URs discussion of race is an integral and distinguishing aspect of its politics and aesthetics that functions to directly oppose not only real-life systems of white supremacy, but also the media that maintains its prevalence in the mainstream.

"Interstellar Fugitives", the first full album credited to Underground Resistance (and released in 1998), saw Mike Banks redefining the collective's sound as "High-Tech Funk", reflecting a shift in emphasis from hard, minimal club Techno to breakbeats, Electro and even occasionally Drum and Bass and down-tempo Hip-Hop.

In 2014, UR took part in a lecture and discussion at New York's Museum of Modern Art.

Their website proclaims the following call to action, encapsulating their attitudes towards the formal music economy:

Isn't it obvious that music and dance are the keys to the universe? So called primitive animals and tribal humans have known this for thousands of years! We urge all brothers and sisters of the underground to create and transmit their tones and frequencies no matter how so called primitive their equipment may be. Transmit these tones and wreak havoc on the programmers! Long live the underground!

- Underground Resistance

== Conflict with Sony BMG ==
In 1999, DJ Rolando released UR's most commercially successful EP, "The Knights of The Jaguar". Legal and conceptual ownership of the track became the subject of a battle between UR and Sony BMG, the details of which are contested.

Sony claimed in subsequent statements that they first tried to contact UR to license the EP for release in Germany, recognizing the potential for a crossover hit. Receiving no response, they instead commissioned and released a trance cover version of the original, "tone-for-tone", which was released as a promo. For their part, UR denies that they ever received a request from Sony to license the track.

Founding member "Mad" Mike denounced the release, arguing that it did not constitute a legitimate cover as it was intended to profit from rather than offer tribute to the group. When confronted, Sony justified its actions by stating they intended to credit Rolando as the composer of the work and grant him royalties on its sale.

Although the group initially suggested they might pursue legal action, they instead conducted a direct action campaign against the label. "Mad" Mike described the strategy as a conceptual rejection of the justice system and its legitimacy. Fans were encouraged to boycott the release and contact record stores and the labels themselves with messages of protest. Some fans reported vandalizing or destroying copies in record stores.

Due to the negative attention directed against the label, Sony voluntarily withdrew the release, citing a desire to avoid further damaging their relationship with the musical underground. The dispute ultimately contributed to the international popularity of the original UR release, which became seen as symbolic of the group's independence and anti-corporate stance.

Rolando departed the collective in 2004.

== Interstellar Fugitives ==
Interstellar Fugitives is the name of a series of compilation-oriented releases associated with the Detroit techno collective Underground Resistance. The first release under the name, issued in 1998, presented recordings by multiple affiliated producers and has been described in retrospective commentary as documenting the wider creative network surrounding the group.

Commentators have noted that the release explored a broader stylistic palette than much of Underground Resistance’s earlier output, incorporating elements of electro, breakbeat and ambient textures alongside established Detroit techno forms. The project has been associated with the collective’s late-1990s shift toward a musical direction sometimes characterised by members as “high-tech funk”.

A follow-up release, Interstellar Fugitives 2 – Destruction of Order, appeared in the mid-2000s, similarly presenting work by artists connected to the Underground Resistance and Submerge distribution network. The name has also been used in connection with live performance configurations involving members of the collective.

== Underground Music Academy ==
Recently, the Underground Music Academy (UMA) was launched in May 2023 by the DJ and producer Waajeed, a student and collaborator of Underground Resistance. The UMA Bandcamp page defines it as “a Detroit-based community music hub, which aims to build the future leaders of electronic music through its distinctive educational curriculum and mentorship model, rooted in Detroit’s Black electronic music legacy.” The academy offers lessons on DJing and music production, offering scholarships to increase accessibility for marginalized youth.

== Discography ==
=== Albums ===
- X-101 (1991 – as X-101)
- X-102 – Discovers The Rings Of Saturn (1992 – as X-102)
- Interstellar Fugitives (1998)
- Interstellar Fugitives 2 – Destruction Of Order (2005)

=== Compilations ===
- Revolution For Change (1991)
- A Hi-tech Jazz Compilation (2005 – as Galaxy 2 Galaxy)

=== Singles/EPs ===
- The Theory (1990 – appeared on the Equinox Chapter One EP)
- Sonic EP (1990)
- Your Time Is Up (1990 – With Yolanda)
- Punisher (1991)
- Riot EP (1991)
- Waveform E.P. (1991)
- The Final Frontier (1991)
- Living For The Nite (1991 – With Yolanda)
- Elimination/Gamma-Ray (1991)
- Nation 2 Nation (1991)
- Fuel For The Fire – Attend The Riot (1991)
- Sonic Destroyer (1991 – as X-101)
- Groundzero / The Rings Of Saturn (1991 – as X-102)
- The Seawolf (1992)
- Fury (1992)
- World 2 World (1992)
- Message To The Majors (1992)
- Belgian Resistance (1992)
- Acid Rain EP (1992)
- Panic EP (1992)
- Piranha (1992)
- Kamikaze (1992)
- The Return Of Acid Rain – The Storm Continues (1993)
- Acid Rain III – Meteor Shower (1993)
- Dark Energy (1994)
- Electronic Warfare (1995)
- Soundpictures EP (1995)
- Electronic Warfare – Designs For Sonic Revolutions (1996)
- Ambush (1997)
- The Turning Point (1997)
- The Infiltraitor (1997)
- Codebreaker (1997)
- Radioactive Rhythms (1997)
- Knights Of The Jaguar EP (1998)
- Hardlife (2001)
- Millennium To Millennium (2001)
- Illuminator (2002)
- The Analog Assassin (2002)
- Inspiration/Transition (2002)
- Actuator (2003)
- Transition/Windchime (2003)
- Ma Ya Ya (2004)
- Interstellar Fugitives 2 – The Destruction Of Order (2006)
- Footwars (2007)
- Electronic Warfare 2.0 (2007)
- Electronic Warfare 2.1 (2007)
- This Is What Happens (2009)
- Somewhere In Japan EP (2010)
- UR Presenta Mano De Fuego (2022)

=== Remixes ===
- 1991 Digital Boy – "This Is Mutha F**ker!"
- 1991 The Reese Project – "Direct Me"
- 1992 Bass Probe – "Mind Experiments"
- 1992 Chez Damier – "Can You Feel It"
- 1992 Ingator II – "Skyscratch (Mano Mano)"
- 1992 Maurizio – "Ploy"
- 1992 The Reese Project – "The Colour of Love"
- 1993 Seven Grand Housing Authority – "The Question"
- 1997 Rashid Salaam – "'D' Old Skool Dances"
- 2000 Kraftwerk – "Expo 2000"
- 2002 Model 600 – "Update"
- 2006 Depeche Mode – "People Are People"
- 2007 Commix – "Satellite Song"
- 2008 Anthony Rother – "When The Sun Goes Down"
- 2010 Soul Designer – "The Soul Is Back"
- 2010 Randolph – "GPS"
- 2013 Robert Hood – "Black Technician"
- 2015 Esteban Adame – "Rise & Shine"
- 2017 Funkadelic – "Music 4 My Mother"
- 2018 Radio Slave – "Trans"
- 2022 Waajeed – "Motor City Madness"

== See also ==
- Detroit techno
- List of record labels
