= Mike Banks (musician) =

American record producer

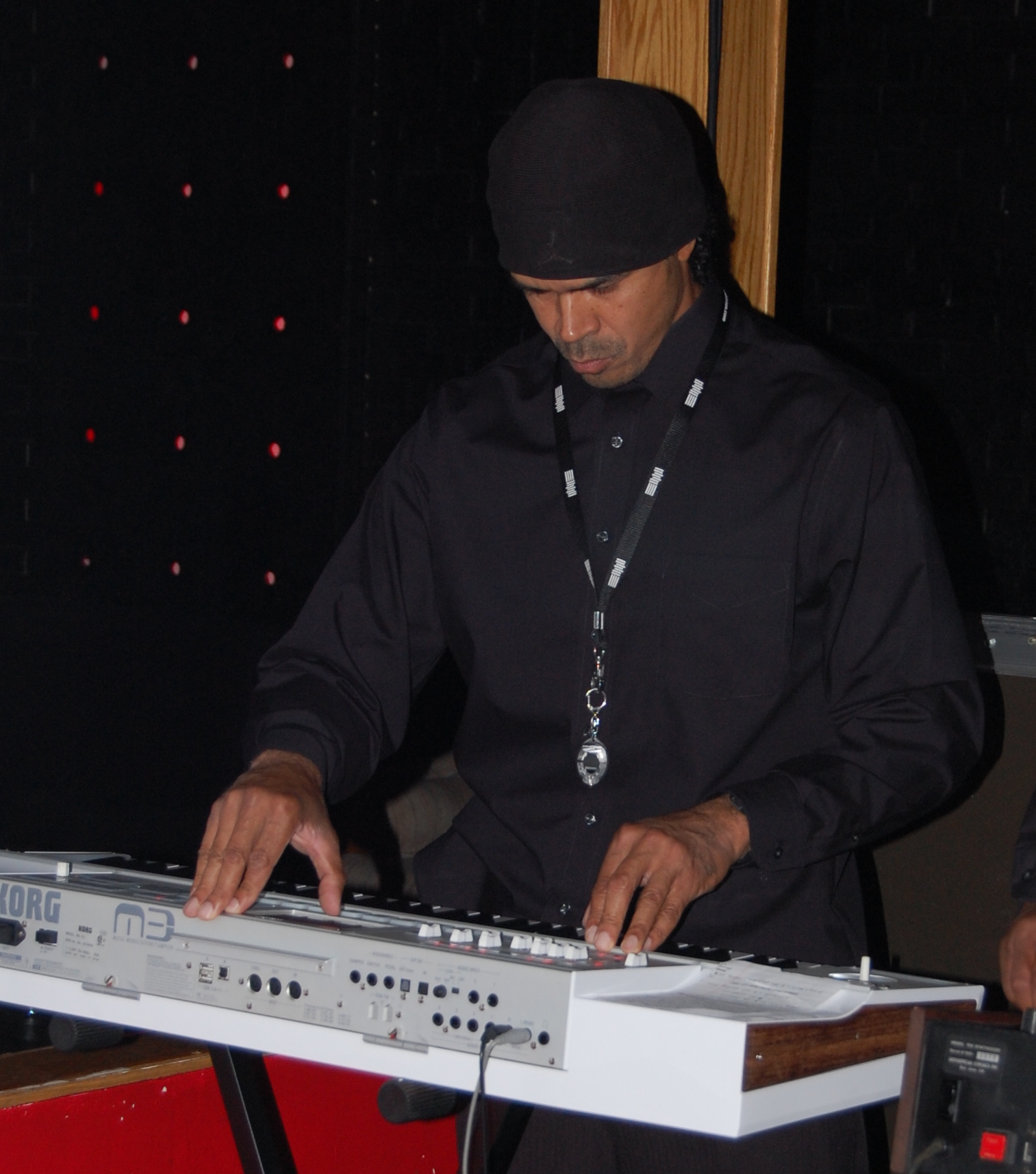
Mike Banks in 2010

Michael Anthony Banks, better known as "Mad" Mike Banks, is an American record producer. He is the co-founder, along with Jeff Mills, of record label Underground Resistance and was a key player in the "second generation" of Detroit techno.

Banks lives in Detroit, Michigan, and is a former studio musician (bass/guitar), having played with Parliament/Funkadelic among others. He worked in the second half of the 1980s with the collective Members of the House, releasing several 12" singles. Banks and Mills founded the label Underground Resistance in the late 1980s, and the pair, along with Robert Hood, produced most of the label's early releases. After Hood and Mills's departure from Underground Resistance, Banks headed the label himself, releasing material from acts such as Drexciya and Sean Deason in addition to his own productions.

He is also co-founder and co-owner with Christa Robinson of Submerge Distribution since 1992. Submerge, along with Underground Resistance, is an independent record label which distributes Detroit-based techno worldwide.

Among Banks's early influences are Derrick May, Juan Atkins and Marshall Jefferson; his later work shows his increasing interest in acid house and industrial. Banks has hewn strictly to an ethic of the underground and refuses to be photographed in public as part of this ethic. His releases often deal with elements of political and social commentary, which have made him a controversial figure from within the Detroit electronic music scene. Banks quit playing live shows in the late 1990s due to continuing problems with bringing electronic equipment through customs agencies, but began doing live shows again in the mid-2000s.

== Discography ==
=== Productions ===
- Members Of The House - Keep Believin' (1987)
- Members Of The House - Share This House (1988)
- Underground Resistance - Your Time Is Up, Direct Me (1990)
- X-101 - Sonic Destroyer (1991)
- Underground Resistance - Waveform EP (1991)
- Underground Resistance - Nation 2 Nation (1991)
- Members Of The House - Reach Out For The Love, These Are My People (1991)
- X-102 - Discovers The Rings Of Saturn (Tresor, 1992)
- Underground Resistance - Acid Rain II; Belgian Resistance; Kamikaze; Message To The Majors; The Seawolf; Piranha; Death Star; Happy Trax No. 1 (1992)
- Underground Resistance - World 2 World (1992)
- Underground Resistance - Revolution For Change (1992)
- The Martian - Meet The Red Planet (1992)
- Davina - Don't You Want It (1992)
- Galaxy 2 Galaxy - Galaxy 2 Galaxy (double-maxi comportant les morceaux Hi-Tech Jazz (The Science), Hi-Tech Jazz (The Elements), Journey Of The Dragons, Star Sailing, Astral Apache, Deep Space 9, Rhythm Of Infinity, Metamorphosis) (1993)
- The Martian - Cosmic Movement / Star Dancer (Red Planet) (1993)
- The Martian - Journey To The Martian Polar Cap (Red Planet) (1993)
- The Martian - Sex In Zero Gravity (Red Planet) (1993)
- The Martian - The Long Winter Of Mars (Red Planet) (1994)
- Members Of The House - Party Of The Year (1994)
- The Martian - Ghostdancer (1995)
- L'Homme Van Renn - The (Real) Love Thang (1995)
- The Martian - Firekeeper / Vortexual Conceptions (1996)
- The Martian - Particle Shower / The Voice Of Grandmother (1996)
- L'Homme Van Renn - Luv + Affection (1996)
- UR - The Hostile / Ambush (1997)
- UR - Codebreaker (1997)
- UR - Radioactive Rhythms (1997)
- UR - The Turning Point (1997)
- UR - Millennium To Millennium (2001)
- UR - Inspiration / Transition (2002)
- UR - Illuminator (2002)
- UR - The Analog Assassin (2002)
- UR - Actuator (2003)
- The Martian - Pipecarrier (2003)
- The Martian - Tobacco Ties / Spacewalker (2003)
- Perception & Mad Mike - Windchime (Underground Resistance, 2004)
- UR - My Ya Ya (2004)
- The Martian - The Last Stand EP (2004)
- UR - Presents Galaxy 2 Galaxy - A Hi-Tech Jazz Compilation (2005)
- Mad Mike - Scalper (Underground Resistance, 2005)
- Mad Mike - Attack Of The Sonic Samurai (Somewhere In Detroit, 2006)
- 040 - Never (Underground Resistance, 2006)
- Mad Mike - Hi-Tech Dreams / Lo-Tech Reality (Underground Resistance, 2007)
- X-102 - Rediscovers The Rings Of Saturn (Tresor, 2008)
