= Jeff Mills =

American DJ, record producer, and composer

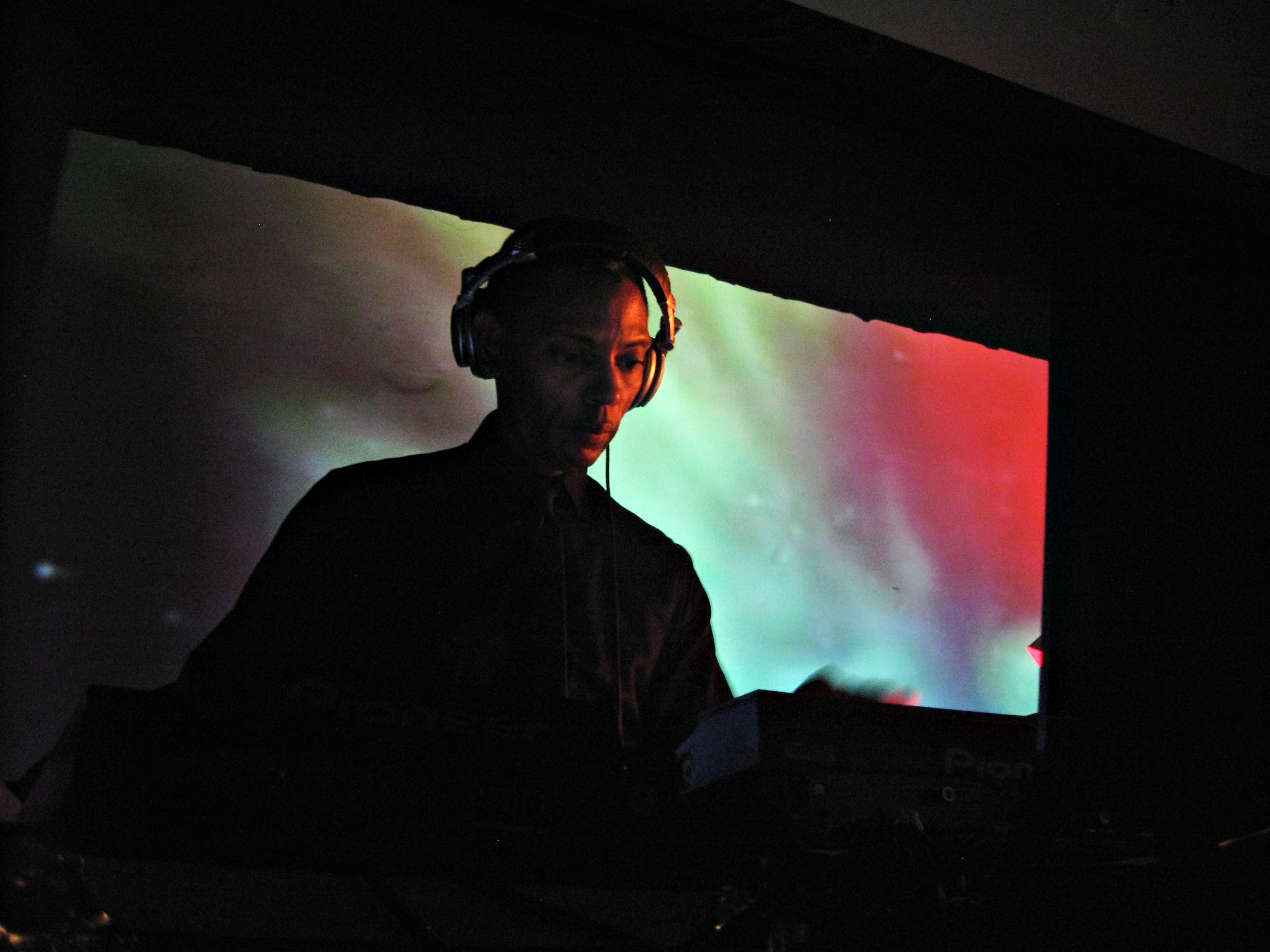
- Mills performing in 2010

Background information
- Also known as: The Wizard, True Faith
- Born: June 18, 1963 (age 63); Detroit, Michigan, U.S.
- Genres: Detroit techno, minimal techno
- Occupations: DJ, record producer, composer
- Instruments: Turntable, synthesizer, drum machine
- Years active: 1980–present
- Label: Axis Records

Jeff Mills (born June 18, 1963, in Detroit, Michigan), also known as "the Wizard", is an American DJ, record producer, and composer. In the late 1980s Mills founded the techno collective Underground Resistance with fellow Detroit techno producers 'Mad' Mike Banks and Robert Hood but left the group to pursue a career as a solo artist in the early 90s. Mills founded the Chicago based Axis Records in 1992, which is responsible for the release of much of his solo work.

Mills has received international recognition for his work as a DJ and producer. He featured in Man from Tomorrow, a documentary about techno music that he produced along with French filmmaker Jacqueline Caux. He continued working in film, releasing Life to Death and Back, a film he shot in the Egyptian wing of the Louvre Museum where he also had a four-month residency. In 2017 the president of the Arab World Institute and former French Minister of Culture Jack Lang awarded Mills the Ordre des Arts et des Lettres for his services to the arts.

== Career ==
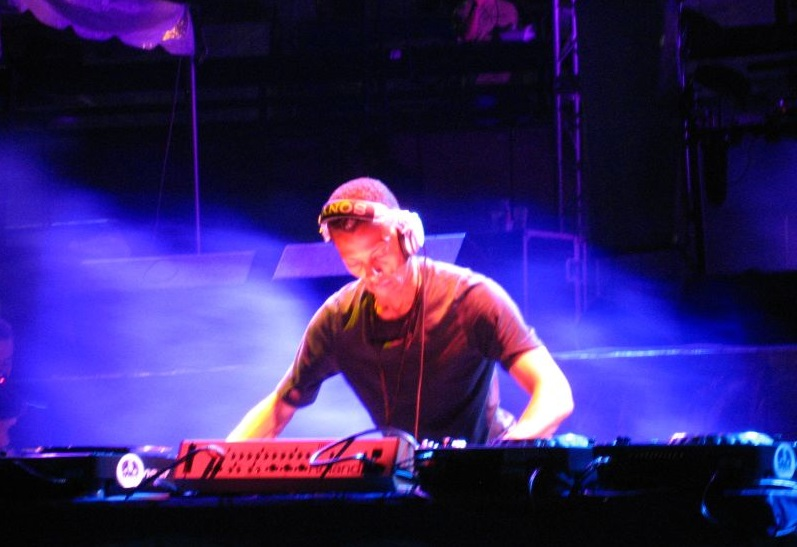
Jeff Mills performing in Detroit in 2007

=== Early career and radio DJ ===
A 1981 graduate of Mackenzie High School, Mills started his career in the early 1980s using the name "the Wizard". He performed DJ tricks like beat juggling and scratching during his sets. He had a nightly show as the Wizard at WDRQ and later at WJLB under the same name. He would highlight local techno artists, giving light to artists such as Derrick May, Kevin Saunderson and Juan Atkins.

In his early career, Mills managed numerous residencies in the Detroit area. He credits The Necto as the residency where he was able to experiment with new ideas in techno music. Mills played The Necto where he began incorporating concepts such as different equipment setups, including positioning himself on the dance floor with the people. For his radio DJ spots, Mills had a music spending budget to use for his sets. Mills would also drive as far as Toronto or Chicago in order to purchase newly released music.

=== Underground Resistance ===
Mills is a founding member of Underground Resistance, a techno collective that he started with former Parliament bass player 'Mad' Mike Banks. The group embraced revolutionary rhetoric and only appeared in public dressed in ski masks and black combat suits. Mills never "officially" left the group, but did begin to pursue his own ventures outside of the collective. Many of Underground Resistance's labelmate's early releases were the product of various experiments by Banks and Mills, both solo and in collaboration, before Mills left the collective in 1991 to achieve international success as a solo artist and DJ. The collective continues to be a mainstay of Detroit's music scene.

UR related the aesthetics of early Detroit Techno to the complex social, political, and economic circumstances which followed on from Reagan-era inner-city economic recession, producing uncompromising music geared toward promoting awareness and facilitating political change. UR's songs created a sense of self-exploration, experimentation and the ability to change yourself and circumstances. Additionally, UR wanted to establish a means of identification beyond traditional lines of race and ethnicity. Another form of UR's rebellion concerns the rejection of the commercialization of techno. This is evident in the messages scratched in UR's records, lyrics and sounds expressing economic independence from major record labels.

=== Solo work and independent labels ===
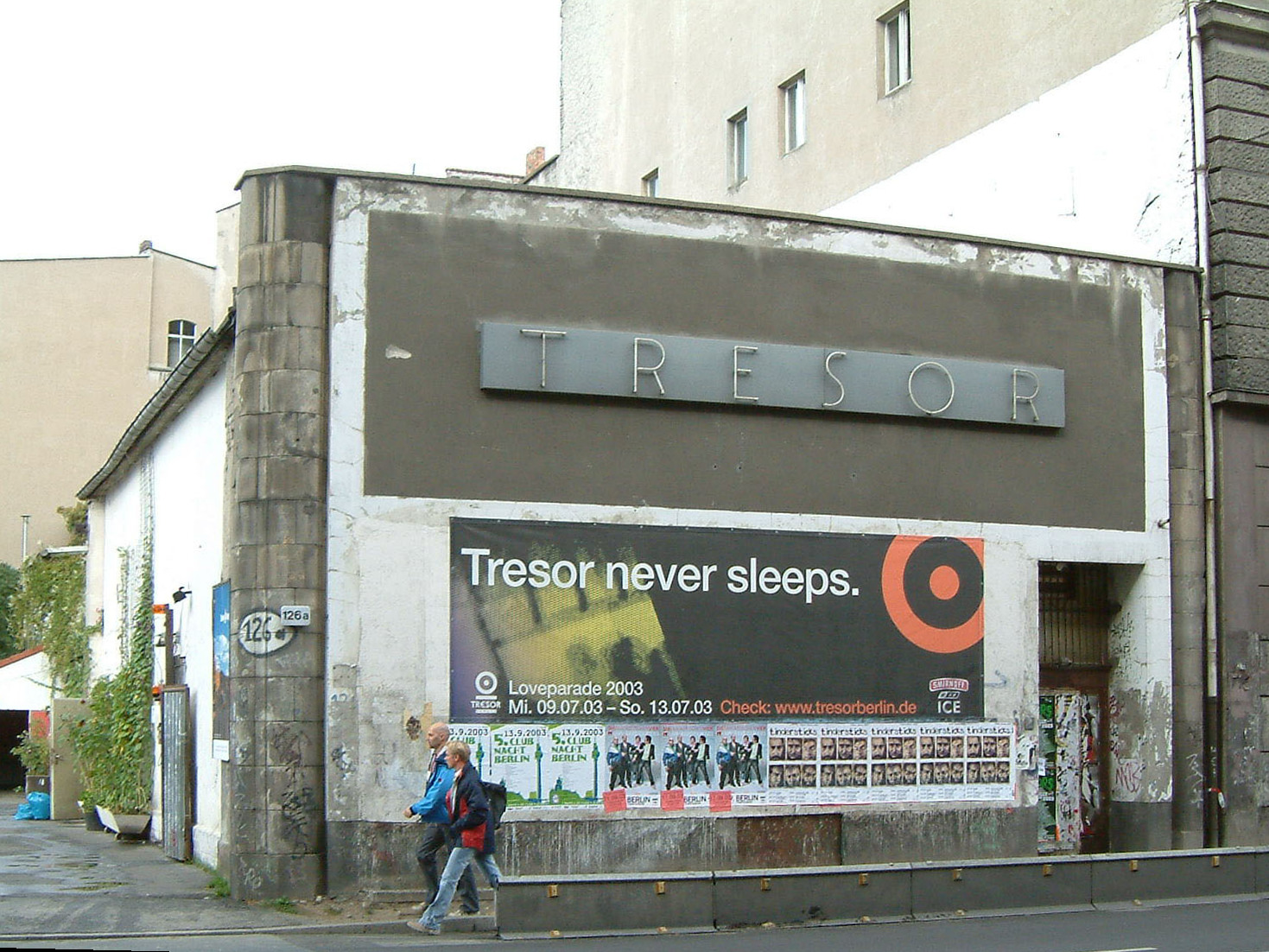
The Tresor Club in Berlin, where Mills was a resident prior to launching Axis Records

Mills left Underground Resistance in 1991 to pursue his own ventures. He relocated from Detroit, first to New York, then Berlin (as a resident at the Tresor club), and then Chicago. There in 1992, with fellow Detroit native Robert Hood, he set up the record label Axis, and later, sub-labels Purpose Maker, Tomorrow, and 6277, all aiming for a more minimal sound than most of the techno being produced in those years.

Mills released Blue Potential in 2006, a live album of him playing with the 70 piece Montpelier Philharmonic Orchestra in 2005. The album was a remix for classical interpretation, following musical acts such as Radiohead. In 2013, he released Where Light Ends, an album inspired by the Japanese astronaut Mamoru Mohri and his first trip to space. In 2018, Mills recorded E.P. Tomorrow Comes The Harvest with legendary afro-jazz drummer Tony Allen.

=== Film, soundtracks, and documentary ===
Mills performed a live set in January 2015 at the Jewish Community Center in San Francisco, California. The set was performed with four turntables to create a cinemix soundtrack for Woman in the Moon, the 1929 silent film from Fritz Lang. The set was performed during a screening of the film at the center. Mills has previously completed work highlighting Lang's career, including composing, performing, and releasing a soundtrack to Lang's 1927 silent film Metropolis, releasing the soundtrack in 2000.

Mills became involved in film with the help of French filmmaker Jacqueline Caux. He helped Caux produce the film Man from Tomorrow, a documentary about techno music that featured Mills. He continued in the film industry with the release of the independent film Life to Death and Back which he shot in the Egyptian wing of the Louvre Museum in France, the same museum where he had a four-month residency.

== Music style ==
In his DJ sets, Mills usually uses three decks, a Roland TR-909 drum machine, and up to 70 records in one hour. Mills' Exhibitionist DVD, from 2004, features him mixing live on three decks and CD player in a studio. In 2011, Mills switched to using three or four CD decks for most of his club appearances, instead of the usual Technics turntables. Mixmag described Mills as the "master" of the 909.

He was mentioned by Detroit rapper Eminem in his song "Groundhog Day", from his album The Marshall Mathers LP 2. Eminem says: "...and discovered this DJ who was mixing, I say it to this day, if you ain't listened to the Wizard, you ain't have a fucking clue what you was missing..."

In 1996 a DJ mixtape of Jeff Mills Djing in Tokyo's Liquid Rooms was released. It is often cited as one of the most important, most energetic and seminal mixes in Techno history. In 2025/2026, on the 30th anniversary of the 1995 event, Mills toured all over the world, often using vinyl and reel to reel as his Djing format.

== Art exhibits ==
Mills is also an artist and has shown his works at exhibits internationally. His works have included "Man of Tomorrow," a portrait of Mills that shows his perception of the future as well as "Critical Arrangements" exhibited at Pompidou Centre in 2008 as a part of "Le Futurisme à Paris – une avant-garde explosive." One of his most notable works was exhibited in 2015. Known as "The Visitor," it was a sculpture of a drum machine inspired by a UFO sighting in Los Angeles from the 1950s.

== Discography ==
=== Studio albums ===
Year, Title (Label)

- 1992, Waveform Transmission Vol.1 (Tresor)
- 1994, Waveform Transmission Vol. 3 (Tresor)
- 1996, Live at the Liquid Room, Tokyo (Sony/React)
- 1997, The Other Day (Sony/React/Labels)
- 1997, Purpose Maker Compilation (React/Labels/NEWS/Neuton/Energy/Watts)
- 1998, From the 21st (Sony)
- 2000, Lifelike (Sony/Labels/NEWS)
- 2000, Art of Connecting (Next Era/Hardware)
- 2000, Metropolis (Tresor)
- 2001, Time Machine (Tomorrow)
- 2001, Every Dog Has Its Day CD (Sony/Labels/NEWS)
- 2002, Actual (Axis)
- 2002, At First Sight (Sony/React/NEWS/Energy/Intergroove)
- 2003, Medium (Axis)
- 2004, Exhibitionist (Axis/React/NEWS/Sonar)
- 2005, Three Ages (MK2)
- 2005, Contact Special (Cisco/Soundscape)
- 2006, One Man Spaceship (Cisco/Soundscape)
- 2008, X-102 Rediscovers the Rings of Saturn (Tresor)
- 2008, Gamma Player Compilation Vol. 1: The Universe by Night (Axis)
- 2009, Sleep Wakes (Third Ear)
- 2010, The Occurrence (Third Ear)
- 2011, The Power (Axis)
- 2011, 2087 (Axis)
- 2011, Jeff Mills/Dj Surgeles Something in the Sky Mix (Axis)
- 2011, Fantastic Voyage (Axis)
- 2012, The Messenger (Axis)
- 2012, Waveform Transmission Vol. 1 Remastered (Axis)
- 2012, Sequence – The Retrospective of Axis Records (Axis)
- 2013, The Jungle PlanetH
- 2014, Emerging Crystal Universe (Axis)
- 2014, Woman in the Moon (Axis)
- 2015, When Time Splits (with Mikhail Rudy) (Axis)
- 2015, Proxima Centauri (Axis)
- 2016, Free Fall Galaxy (Axis)
- 2017, A Trip to the Moon (Axis)
- 2017, Planets (Axis)
- 2019, Moon - The Area of Influence (Axis)

=== Extended plays ===
Year, Title (Label)

- 1992, Tranquilizer (Axis)
- 1993, Mecca (Axis)
- 1993, Thera (Axis)
- 1994, Cycle 30 (Axis)
- 1994, Growth (Axis)
- 1995, Purpose Maker EP (Axis)
- 1995, Humana (Axis)
- 1995, Tephra (Axis)
- 1996, Other Day EP (Axis)
- 1996, Very (Axis)
- 1996, AX-009ab (Axis)
- 1996, Java (Purpose Maker)
- 1996, Kat Moda (Purpose Maker)
- 1997, Universal Power (Purpose Maker)
- 1997, Our Man in Havana (Purpose Maker)
- 1997, Steampit (Purpose Maker)
- 1997, More Drama (Axis)
- 1997, Tomorrow EP (Axis)
- 1998, Vanishing (Purpose Maker)
- 1998, Live Series (Purpose Maker)
- 1999, Skin Deep (Purpose Maker)
- 1999, If/Tango (w/ Anna F.) (Purpose Maker)
- 1999, Apollo (Axis)
- 1999, Preview (Tomorrow)
- 2000, Every Dog Has Its Day vol.1 (Axis)
- 2000, Lifelike EP (Axis)
- 2000, Metropolis EP (Axis)
- 2000, Every Dog Has Its Day vol.2 (Axis)
- 2000, Circus (Purpose Maker)
- 2001, Jetset (Purpose Maker)
- 2001, Electrical Experience (Purpose Maker)
- 2001, 4Art/UFO
- 2002, Every Dog Has Its Day vol.3 (Axis)
- 2002, Actual (Axis)
- 2003, Every Dog Has Its Day vol.4 (Axis)
- 2003, Medium (Axis)
- 2003, See the Light part 1 (Axis)
- 2003, See the Light part 2 (Axis)
- 2003, See the Light part 3 (Axis)
- 2003, Divine (Purpose Maker)
- 2004, Expanded (Axis)
- 2004, From the 21st part 1 (Axis)
- 2004, From the 21st part 2 (Axis)
- 2004, The Tomorrow Time Forgot (Axis)
- 2005, Suspense/Dramatized (Axis)
- 2005, Time Mechanic (Axis)
- 2006, Blade Runner (Axis)
- 2006, The Bells (Purpose Maker)
- 2007, Natural World (Purpose Maker)
- 2007, Systematic/The Sin (Axis)
- 2008, Alpha Centauri (Axis)
- 2008, FlyBy (Axis)
- 2008, Eternity (Tomorrow)
- 2008, Adjustments (Tomorrow)
- 2009, Good Robot (Axis)
- 2009, The Defender (Axis)
- 2009, The Drummer (Purpose Maker)
- 2009, The Drummer part 2 (Purpose Maker)
- 2009, Something in the Sky (Something In The Sky)
- 2010, The Drummer part 3 (Purpose Maker)
- 2010, Something in the Sky 2 (Something In The Sky)
- 2010, Something in the Sky 3 (Something In The Sky)
- 2010, Something in the Sky 4 (Something In The Sky)
- 2010, Something in the Sky 5 (Something In The Sky)
- 2010, Something in the Sky 6 (Something In The Sky)
- 2011, Something in the Sky 7 (Something In The Sky)
- 2011, Beat Master (Axis)
- 2011, The Power (Axis)
- 2011, Star Chronicles (Tomorrow)
- 2012, Something in the Sky 10 (Something In The Sky)
- 2013, Something in the Sky 11 (Something In The Sky)
- 2013, The Space Horizon (Axis)
- 2014, What a Machine Believes (Axis)
- 2014, Zones and Layers (Axis)
- 2015, Exhibitionist 2 part 1 (Axis)
- 2018, Tomorrow Comes the Harvest (with Tony Allen) (Blue Note Records)

== Filmography ==
- 2004, Exhibitionist (Axis/React/NEWS/Sonar)
- 2004, Three Ages (MK2)
- 2006, The Bells – 10 Year Anniversary (Axis)
- 2006, Blue Potential (with Monpelier Philharmonic Orchestra) (UWe)
- 2013, Chronicles of Possible Worlds (Axis/Second Nature)
- 2014, Man from Tomorrow (Axis)
- 2015, Exhibitionist 2 (Axis)
