= List of Billboard number-one dance singles of 1989 =

Billboard magazine compiled the top-performing dance singles in the United States on the Hot Dance Music Club Play chart and the Hot Dance Music 12-inch Singles Sales chart. Premiered in 1976, the Club Play chart ranked the most-played singles on dance club based on reports from a national sample of club DJs. The 12-inch Singles Sales chart was launched in 1985 to compile the best-selling dance singles based on retail sales across the United States.

== Charts history ==
Chart history
Issue date	Hot Dance Music Club Play		Hot Dance Music 12-inch Singles Sales		Ref.
Issue date	Title	Artist(s)	Title	Artist(s)	Ref.
January 7	"Get on the Dance Floor"	Rob Base and DJ E-Z Rock	"I Wanna Have Some Fun"	Samantha Fox	
January 14	"Get on the Dance Floor"	Rob Base and DJ E-Z Rock	"The Lover In Me"	Sheena Easton	
January 21	"Good Life"	Inner City	"Walking Away"	Information Society	
January 28	"Good Life"	Inner City	"Wild Thing"	Tone-Loc	
February 4	"Wild Thing"	Tone Lōc	"Wild Thing"	Tone-Loc	
February 11	"All She Wants Is"	Duran Duran	"Wild Thing"	Tone-Loc	
February 18	"All She Wants Is"	Duran Duran	"Straight Up"	Paula Abdul	
February 25	"Fading Away"	Will to Power	"Straight Up"	Paula Abdul	
March 4	"Fading Away"	Will to Power	"Straight Up"	Paula Abdul	
March 11	"That's the Way Love Is"	Ten City	"I Beg Your Pardon"	Kon Kan	
March 18	"She Drives Me Crazy"	Fine Young Cannibals	"I Beg Your Pardon"	Kon Kan	
March 25	"She Drives Me Crazy"	Fine Young Cannibals	"Girl You Know It's True"	Milli Vanilli	
April 1	"This Is Acid (A New Dance Craze)"	Maurice	"Girl You Know It's True"	Milli Vanilli	
April 8	"This Is Acid (A New Dance Craze)"	Maurice	"This Is Acid (A New Dance Craze)"	Maurice	
April 15	"Like a Prayer"	Madonna	"This Is Acid (A New Dance Craze)"	Maurice	
April 22	"Like a Prayer"	Madonna	"Like a Prayer"	Madonna	
April 29	"Buffalo Stance"	Neneh Cherry	"Like a Prayer"	Madonna	
May 6	"Real Love"	Jody Watley	"Like a Prayer"	Madonna	
May 13	"Real Love"	Jody Watley	"Like a Prayer"	Madonna	
May 20	"We Call It Acieed"/ "Trance Dance"	D-Mob featuring Gary Haisman	"Funky Cold Medina"	Tone-Loc	
May 27	"Round & Round"	New Order	"Buffalo Stance"	Neneh Cherry	
June 3	"Me Myself and I"	De La Soul	"Me Myself and I"	De La Soul	
June 10	"Uh-Uh Ooh-Ooh Look Out (Here It Comes)"	Roberta Flack	"Me Myself and I"	De La Soul	
June 17	"Ain't Nobody Better"	Inner City	"This Time I Know It's For Real"	Donna Summer	
June 24	"Keep on Movin'"	Soul II Soul	"Keep on Movin'"	Soul II Soul Featuring Caron Wheeler	
July 1	"Secret Rendezvous"	Karyn White	"Keep on Movin'"	Soul II Soul Featuring Caron Wheeler	
July 8	"Express Yourself"	Madonna	"Keep on Movin'"	Soul II Soul Featuring Caron Wheeler	
July 15	"Express Yourself"	Madonna	"Keep on Movin'"	Soul II Soul Featuring Caron Wheeler	
July 22	"Express Yourself"	Madonna	"Express Yourself"	Madonna	
July 29	"Deep in Vogue"	Malcolm McLaren	"Express Yourself"	Madonna	
August 5	"Let It Roll"	Doug Lazy	"Express Yourself"	Madonna	
August 12	"Come Home with Me Baby"	Dead or Alive	"Express Yourself"	Madonna	
August 19	"Batdance"	Prince	"Friends"	Jody Watley with Eric B. & Rakim	
August 26	"Back to Life (However Do You Want Me)"	Soul II Soul featuring Caron Wheeler	"Come Home with Me Baby"	Dead or Alive	
September 2	"Back to Life (However Do You Want Me)"	Soul II Soul featuring Caron Wheeler	"Batdance" (From "Batman")	Prince	
September 9	"Back to Life (However Do You Want Me)"	Soul II Soul featuring Caron Wheeler	"Back to Life (However Do You Want Me)"	Soul II Soul featuring Caron Wheeler	
September 16	"It's Time to Get Funky"	D-Mob featuring LRS	"Back to Life (However Do You Want Me)"	Soul II Soul featuring Caron Wheeler	
September 23	"Do You Love What You Feel"	Inner City	"Back to Life (However Do You Want Me)"	Soul II Soul featuring Caron Wheeler	
September 30	Life Is a Dance (all cuts)	Chaka Khan	"Back to Life (However Do You Want Me)"	Soul II Soul featuring Caron Wheeler	
October 7	"Miss You Much"	Janet Jackson	"Miss You Much"	Janet Jackson	
October 14	"Miss You Much"	Janet Jackson	"Miss You Much"	Janet Jackson	
October 21	"French Kiss"	Lil Louis	"Miss You Much"	Janet Jackson	
October 28	"French Kiss"	Lil Louis	"Miss You Much"	Janet Jackson	
November 4	"Pump Up the Jam"	Technotronic	"French Kiss"	Lil Louis	
November 11	"Pump Up the Jam"	Technotronic	"French Kiss"	Lil Louis	
November 18	"Pump Up the Jam"	Technotronic	"French Kiss"	Lil Louis	
November 25	"Pump Up the Jam"	Technotronic	"Pump Up the Jam"	Technotronic Featuring Felly	
December 2	"Git on Up"	Fast Eddie featuring Sundance	"Pump Up the Jam"	Technotronic Featuring Felly	
December 9	"Love on Top of Love (Killer Kiss)"	Grace Jones	"Pump Up the Jam"	Technotronic Featuring Felly	
December 16	"Love on Top of Love (Killer Kiss)"	Grace Jones	"Pump Up the Jam"	Technotronic Featuring Felly	
December 23	"Rhythm Nation"	Janet Jackson	"Pump Up the Jam"	Technotronic Featuring Felly	
December 30	"Rhythm Nation"	Janet Jackson	"Pump Up the Jam"	Technotronic Featuring Felly	

== See also ==
- 1989 in music
- List of Billboard Hot 100 number ones of 1989
