= Timeline of Billboard number-one dance songs =

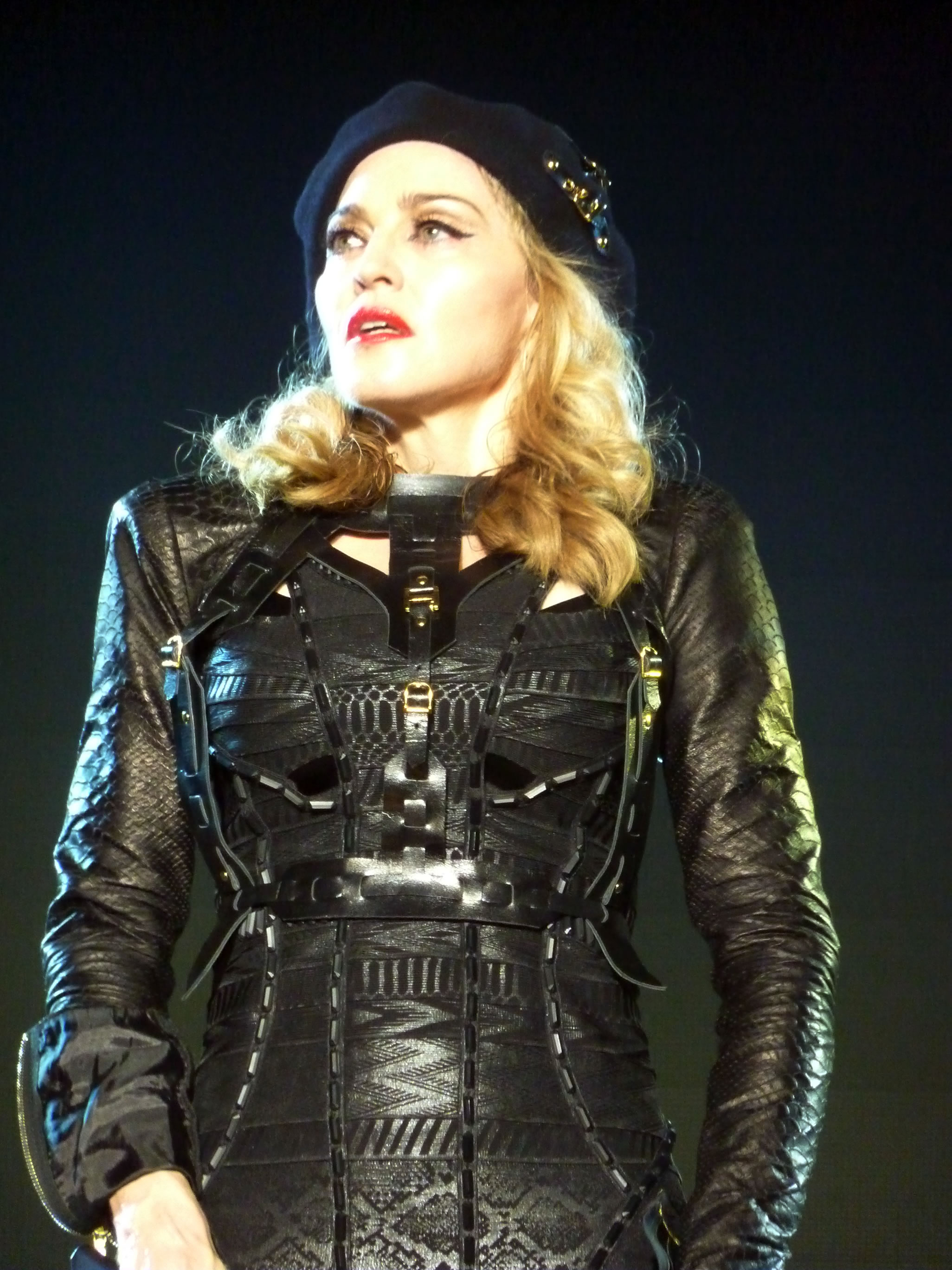
Madonna is Billboard's most successful dance music artist of all time.

Billboard magazine has published charts ranking the top-performing dance music songs in the United States since 1974. Originally a top-ten list of tracks that garnered the largest audience response in New York City discothèques, the chart began on October 26, 1974, under the title Disco Action. The chart went on to feature playlists from various cities around the country from week to week. Billboard continued to run regional and city-specific charts throughout 1975 and 1976 until the issue dated August 28, 1976, when a 30-position National Disco Action Top 30 premiered. The first number-one song on the chart for the issue dated August 28, 1976, was "You Should Be Dancing" by the Bee Gees.

The Dance/Disco chart was split into the 12-inch Singles Sales chart and the Club Play chart on the issue dated March 16, 1985. The first number one on the dance sales chart was "New Attitude"/"Axel F", a split single by Patti LaBelle and Harold Faltermeyer from Beverly Hills Cop soundtrack. On March 1, 2003, Billboard launched the 40-position Hot Dance Radio Airplay chart online August 16, 2003, ranking the songs on stations playing mainly dance music. The first dance airplay number one was Beyoncé's "Crazy In Love". On the issue dated January 26, 2013, Billboard launched the Hot Dance/Electronic Songs chart, tracking top 50 dance songs based on digital downloads, radio airplay, streaming, and club play. Billboard split the Hot Dance/Electronic Songs chart on January 18, 2025 to create the Hot Dance/Pop Songs chart, which focuses on songs with "dance-centric vocals, melody, and hooks by artists not rooted in the dance genre". Since then, the Hot Dance/Electronic Songs chart compiles songs primarily recorded by DJs or producers, with an emphasis on electronic-based production.

Madonna is the most successful dance music artist of all time, with a total of 50 number ones on the Dance Club Songs chart and 33 number ones on the Dance Singles Sales chart. She additionally earned nine number ones on the Dance Airplay, which was created 20 years after her debut. Her dance chart-toppers span five different decades from "Holiday"/"Lucky Star" (1983) to "Love Sensation" (2026). David Guetta is the artist with the most number ones on the Dance Airplay chart, with a total of 21 songs from "The World Is Mine" (2004) to "Save Me Tonight" (2026). The Chainsmokers is the act with the most number ones on the Hot Dance/Electronic Songs chart, with a total of six songs from "#Selfie" (2014) to "Something Just Like This" (2017).

== Dance charts history ==
Each entry in the "Year" column links to the list of number ones for that particular year.

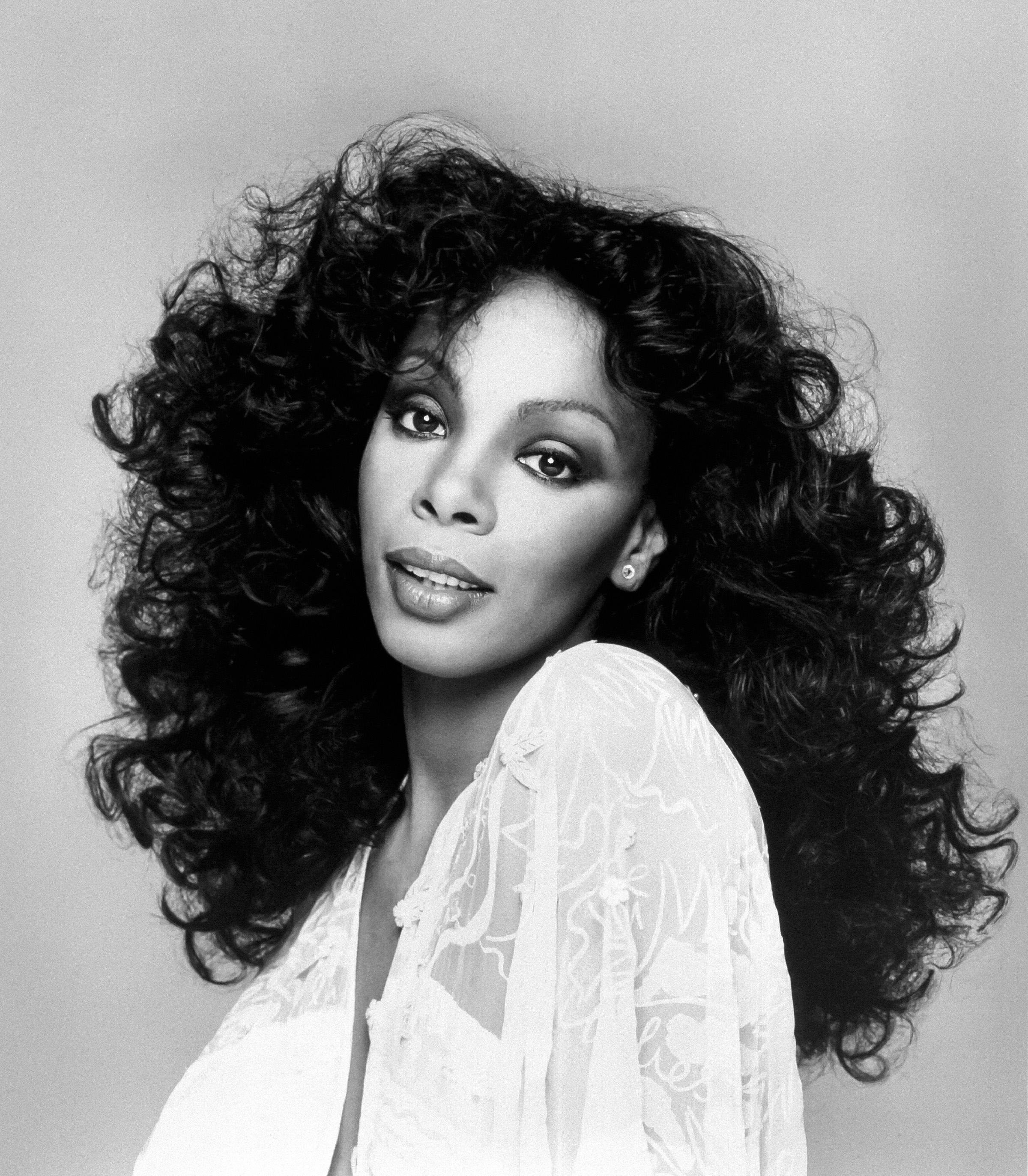
Donna Summer is the most successful dance artist of the 1970s, with seven number ones during the decade.

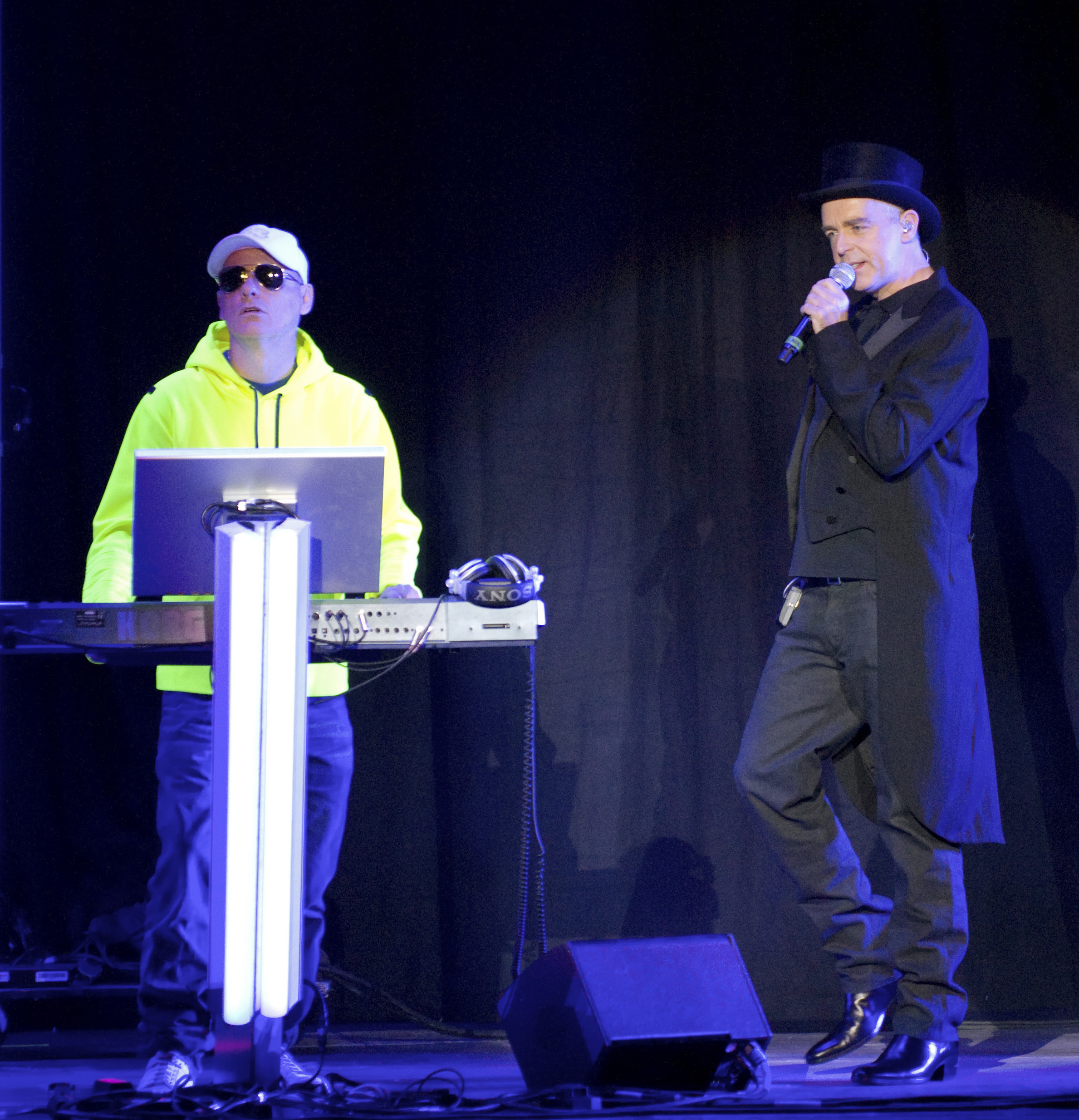
Pet Shop Boys is the most successful group on the Dance Club Songs chart.

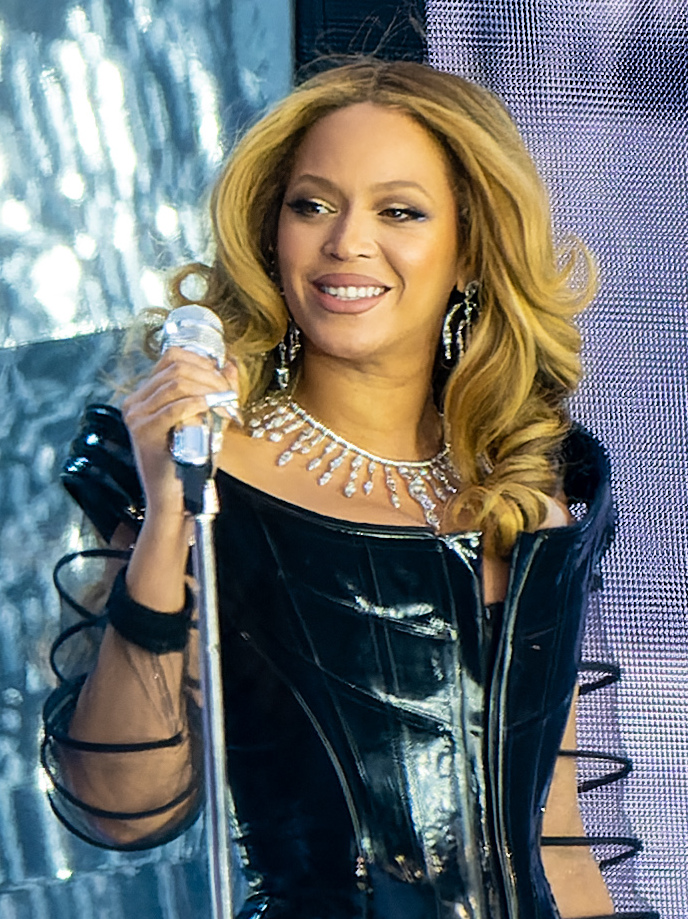
"Crazy in Love" (2003) by Beyoncé is the first dance airplay number one.

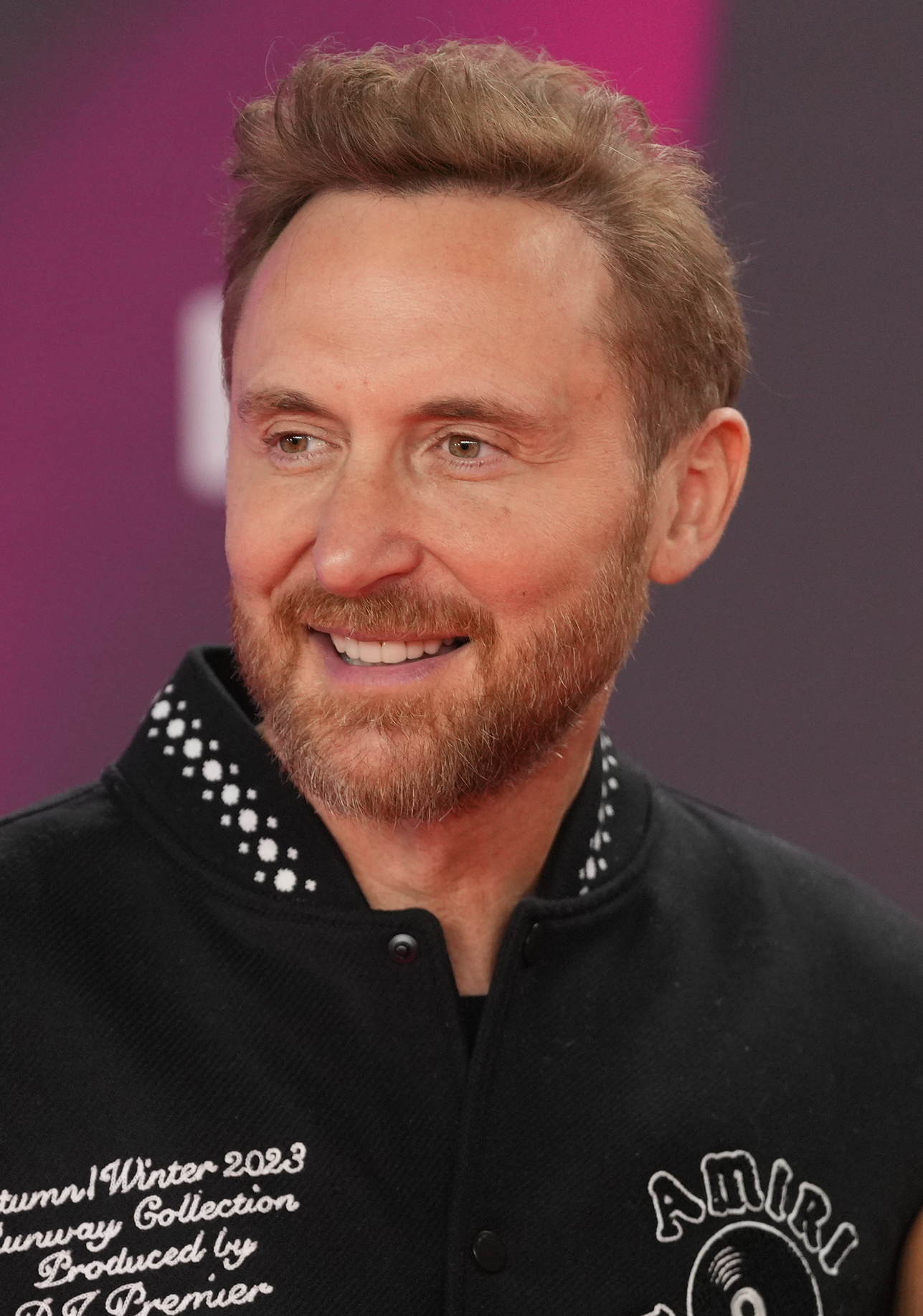
David Guetta has charted a record 21 dance airplay number ones since 2004.

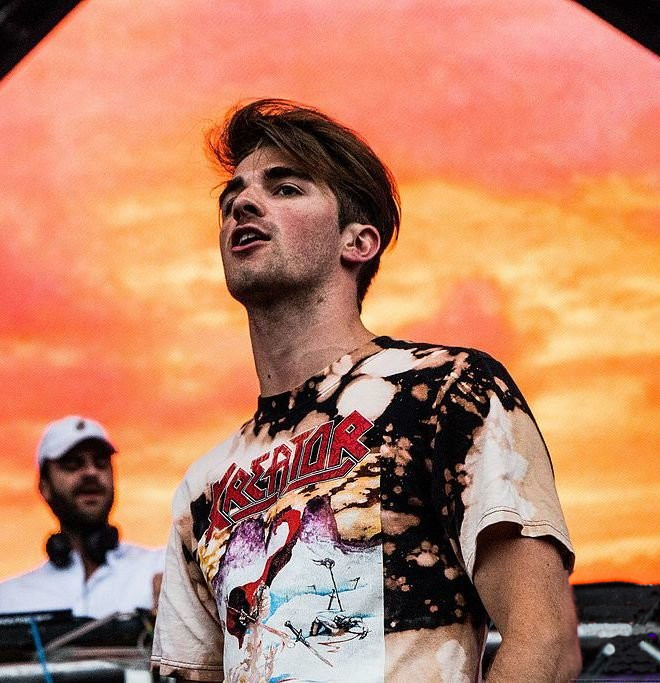
The Chainsmokers has charted a record six number ones on the Hot Dance/Electronic Songs since 2014.

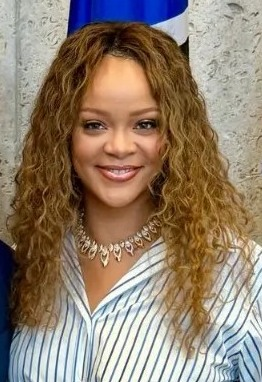
Rihanna's Anti (2016) is the only album to produce eight number ones on the Dance Club Songs chart.

Chart history
Year	Notes	Ref.
1974	Billboard launched Disco Action chart, its first dance music chart, on the issue dated October 26; the first number one was "Never Can Say Goodbye" by Gloria Gaynor.	
1975	Record World began compiling a dance chart which incorporated club play on a national level, with "Bad Luck" by Harold Melvin & the Blue Notes as the first number-one single. Billboard statistician Joel Whitburn adopted its chart data from the weeks between March 29, 1975, and August 21, 1976, into Billboards club play history.	
1976	Billboard premiered the National Disco Action Top 30 chart, which based on club play across the United States, on the issue dated August 28; the first number one was "You Should Be Dancing" by the Bee Gees.	
1977	Donna Summer scored her first two chart-toppers on the National Disco Action Top 40, with the LP cuts of I Remember Yesterday and Once Upon a Time.	
1978	The year's top-performing disco single was the LP cuts from Thank God It's Friday soundtrack by Donna Summer, Pattie Brooks, Love & Kisses, and Sunshine	
1979	Donna Summer's Bad Girls (LP cuts) topped the Disco Top 80 chart for seven consecutive weeks, the longest that year. "No More Tears (Enough Is Enough)" became Summer's seventh disco number one, the most by any act of the decade.	
1980	Change's The Glow of Love (LP cuts) topped the Disco Top 100 chart for nine consecutive weeks, the longest that year.	
1981	Prince earned his first disco number one with "Controversy"/"Let's Work", a double-A-side single which topped the Disco Top 80 chart for six consecutive weeks.	
1982	"Glad to Know You"/"3,000,000 Synths"/"Questionnaire" by Chas Jankel was the year's biggest single on the Dance/Disco Top 80, topping the chart for seven consecutive weeks.	
1983	Michael Jackson's Thriller (LP cuts) remained atop the Dance/Disco Top 80 chart for 11 weeks, the longest in history. Madonna achieved her first number-one single on the chart with "Holiday"/"Lucky Star".	
1984	Prince's "When Doves Cry" topped the Dance/Disco Top 80 chart for six consecutive weeks, longer than any other singles that year. On the issue dated October 20, the chart was renamed as the Hot Dance/Disco.	
1985	The Hot Dance/Disco chart was split into the 12-inch Singles Sales chart and the Club Play chart on the issue dated March 16. The first number one on the dance sales chart was "New Attitude"/"Axel F", a split single by Patti LaBelle and Harold Faltermeyer.	
1986	Janet Jackson achieved her first number ones on the dance charts, with "What Have You Done for Me Lately" on the 12-inch Singles Sales chart, as well as "When I Think of You" and "Control on the Club Play chart.	
1987	The word "disco" was removed from the title of the section of both charts beginning on September 19. Billboard retitled the section Hot Dance Music on October 24. Whitney Houston charted her first number ones on the Club Play chart, with "I Wanna Dance with Somebody (Who Loves Me)" and "So Emotional".	
1988	Rick Astley topped the Club Play chart with "Never Gonna Give You Up" and "Together Forever", the former of which also spent four weeks atop the 12-inch Singles Sales chart.	
1989	Inner City topped the Club Play chart with three singles: "Good Life, "Ain't Nobody Better", and "Do You Love What You Feel".	
1990	Janet Jackson released three number-one singles on the Club Play chart: "Rhythm Nation", "Escapade", and "Alright".	
1991	Mariah Carey earned her first number ones on the Club Play chart with "Someday" and "Emotions".	
1992	On the issue dated June 20, Billboard began to tabulate cassette tape and CD maxi-singles along with 12-inch singles, and the sales chart was renamed as the Hot Dance Music Maxi-Singles Sales.	
1993	The year's biggest dance single was "Supermodel (You Better Work)" by RuPaul. Despite stalling at number two on the Club Play chart, it topped the Maxi-Singles Sales chart for two weeks.	
1994	Kristine W earned her first number one on the Club Play chart with "Feel What You Want".	
1995	Mariah Carey charted two number ones on the Maxi-Singles Sales chart, "Fantasy" and "One Sweet Day", the former of which also topped the Club Play chart for three weeks.	
1996	2Pac's "How Do U Want It"/"California Love" topped the Maxi-Singles Sales chart for 12 non-consecutive weeks.	
1997	Toni Braxton's "Un-Break My Heart" was the year's biggest dance song, topping both the Club Play and Maxi-Singles Sales charts.	
1998	"The Boy Is Mine" by Brandy and Monica topped the Maxi-Singles Sales chart for 21 weeks, making it the longest-running number one at the time.	
1999	Jennifer Lopez charted at number one on the dance charts for the first time, with "If You Had My Love" topping the Maxi-Singles Sales chart and "Waiting for Tonight" topping the Club Play chart.	
2000	Madonna's "Music" was the year's biggest dance song, topping the Club Play chart for five weeks and the Maxi-Singles Sales chart for 11 weeks.	
2001	Sono's "Keep Control" was the year's top-performing song on the Club Play chart, spending four consecutive weeks at number one.	
2002	Kylie Minogue earned her first number one on the Club Play chart with "Can't Get You Out of My Head".	
2003	The Maxi-Singles Sales chart was renamed the Dance Singles Sales on March 1, 2003. Billboard launched the 40-position Hot Dance Radio Airplay chart online August 16, 2003, ranking the most-played songs on dance radio. The first dance airplay number one was Beyoncé's "Crazy In Love", which also became her first number one on the Club Play chart.	
2004	David Guetta, the artist with the most songs topping the Hot Dance Radio Airplay, scored his first number one on the chart, with "The World Is Mine" (featuring JD Davis).	
2005	On the issue dated June 18, "One Word" by Kelly Osbourne became the first ever song to top all three dance charts—Club Play, Singles Sales, and Airplay—in the same week.	
2006	"Every Day Is Exactly the Same" by Nine Inch Nails topped the Hot Dance Singles Sales chart. It spent the most weeks at number one by any single in the chart's history, with a total of 36 non-consecutive weeks.	
2007	The Hot Dance Singles Sales chart became only available at billboard.biz after the issue dated February 24, and was reduced from 25 to 15 positions on March 30. Dave Audé earned his first number one on the Club Play chart with "Make It Last".	
2008	Natasha Bedingfield earned the most number ones during the year, with "Love like This", "Pocketful of Sunshine", and "Angel".	
2009	On the issue dated June 20, the Hot Dance Club Play chart was renamed as the Hot Dance Club Songs. Pet Shop Boys topped the chart with "Love Etc." and "Did You See Me Coming?", extending their record as the group with the most number ones (11).	
2010	Rihanna charted four number ones on the Dance Club Songs with "Russian Roulette", "Hard", "Rude Boy", and "Only Girl (In the World)", as well as two number ones on the Hot Dance Airplay chart with "Rude Boy" and "Only Girl (In the World)".	
2011	Enrique Iglesias became the first male solo artist to have 10 number ones on the Dance/Club Play chart with "Tonight (I'm Lovin' You)", passing Michael Jackson and Prince with seven number ones each. The Hot Dance Airplay chart was renamed the Dance/Mix Show Airplay on the issue dated November 19.	
2012	"Call Me Maybe" by Carly Rae Jepsen spent 22 weeks atop the Hot Dance Singles Sales chart, the longest by a soloist.	
2013	On the issue dated January 26, Billboard launched the Hot Dance/Electronic Songs chart, tracking top 50 dance songs based on downloads, radio airplay, streaming, and club play. Its first number one was "Scream & Shout" by will.i.am and Britney Spears. Due to the decline of record sales, the Dance Singles Sales chart was defunct after the issue dated November 30.	
2014	"Turn Down for What" by DJ Snake and Lil Jon topped the Hot Dance/Electronic Songs chart for 12 consecutive weeks and became the chart's top-performing song of the year. The Chainsmokers, the act with the most number ones (7) on the Hot Dance/Electronic Songs, topped the chart for the first time with "#Selfie".	
2015	"Lean On" by Major Lazer & DJ Snake featuring MØ topped the Hot Dance/Electronic Songs chart for 23 consecutive weeks (including one week in 2016) and became the chart's top-performing song of the year.	
2016	Rihanna's eighth studio album, Anti, spawned the Dance Club Songs number ones "Work", "Kiss It Better", and "Needed Me". It scored five additional chart-toppers for the next two years—"Love on the Brain", "Sex with Me", "Pose", "Desperado", and "Consideration"—becoming the only album to produce eight number ones on the chart.	
2017	With "Swish Swish", Katy Perry set the record for the most consecutive number ones on the Dance Club Songs chart (18).	
2018	On the issue dated September 29, "Happier" by Marshmello and Bastille began its 69-week running at number one on the Hot Dance/Electronic Songs chart, the longest by any song in the chart's history. It became the chart's only number-one song during the entire calendar year of 2019.	
2019	On the issue dated September 29, "Happier" by Marshmello and Bastille began its 69-week running at number one on the Hot Dance/Electronic Songs chart, the longest by any song in the chart's history. It became the chart's only number-one song during the entire calendar year of 2019.	
2020	Madonna achieved her 50th Dance Club Songs number one with "I Don't Search I Find", making her the first ever act to score as many as 50 chart-toppers on any single Billboard chart. Lasting for nearly 44 years, the Dance Club Songs chart was defunct after the issue dated March 28 due to the COVID-19 pandemic causing nightclubs to close.	
2021	On the issue dated October 23, "Cold Heart (Pnau remix)" by Elton John and Dua Lipa began its 36-week running at number one on the Hot Dance/Electronic Songs chart.	
2022	On the issue dated October 1, "I'm Good (Blue)" by David Guetta and Bebe Rexha began its 55-week running at number one on the Hot Dance/Electronic Songs chart.	
2023	Dua Lipa's "Houdini" was the longest-running solo number one of 2023 on the Hot Dance/Electronic Songs chart. It spent a total of 17 non-consecutive weeks at the summit and became the chart's top-performing song of 2024.	
2024	Dua Lipa's "Houdini" was the longest-running solo number one of 2023 on the Hot Dance/Electronic Songs chart. It spent a total of 17 non-consecutive weeks at the summit and became the chart's top-performing song of 2024.	
2025	Beginning on the issue dated January 18, the Hot Dance/Electronic Songs was revamped to only include "songs primarily recorded by DJs or producers, with an emphasis on electronic-based production". As the result, Billboard premiered the Hot Dance/Pop Songs, containing 15 songs with "dance-centric vocals, melody, and hooks by artists not rooted in the dance genre". The chart's first number one was "It's OK I'm OK" by Tate McRae.	
2026		

== See also ==
- List of artists who reached number one on the U.S. Dance Club Songs chart
- List of artists who reached number one on the U.S. dance airplay chart
- List of artists who reached number one on the Hot Dance/Electronic Songs
