= Fast Eddie (producer) =

American house musician

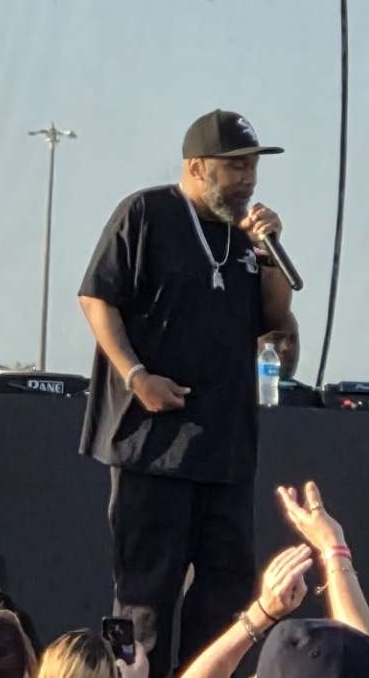
- Fast Eddie on June 14, 2025 in Aurora, Illinois

Background information
- Birth name: Edwin A. Smith
- Also known as: Fast Eddie
- Origin: Chicago, Illinois, US
- Genres: House, hip house, hip hop
- Occupation: Record producer
- Years active: 1987–present

Edwin A. Smith, known as Fast Eddie, is an American house producer and hip hop musician from Chicago, Illinois.

== Career ==
Fast Eddie began as a DJ of the early Chicago house movement, including playing spots on WGCI-FM and WBMX. During that period, he produced one of his first singles in collaboration with Kenny "Jammin'" Jason entitled "Can You Dance", circa 1986. In 1987, Eddie came out with other house tracks such as "The Whop", based on the dance of the same name.

Eddie left WGCI for WBMX for a short time and then quit his radio DJ gigs to concentrate on producing. In 1988, he scored one of his biggest hits with "Acid Thunder" on DJ International Records. However, it was the track "Hip House" that established his career as a producer. Eddie popularized the genre of hip house. He scored several hits on the US Billboard Hot Dance Music/Club Play chart in the late 1980s and early 1990s, including "Git On Up" (featuring Sundance), which spent a week at number one in 1989, but only reached number 49 in the UK Singles Chart.

Eddie tried his hand at gangsta rap in 1990 by forming the group America's Most Wanted. Later that year, he released "Make Some Noise". At some time during 1995, Eddie made two ghetto house collaborations. The first of these is titled "Booty Call" with DJ Sneak and the other is titled "Pump It" with DJ Funk.

== Discography ==
=== Albums ===
- Jack to the Sound (1988)
- Most Wanted (1989)
- Straight Jackin' (1991)
- House Music (2009)

=== Singles ===
- "Can U Dance" with Kenny "Jammin" Jason (1987)
- "Don't Want It" with Kenny "Jammin" Jason feat. Paris Grey (1987)
- "Jack the House" (1987)
- "The Whop" (1987)
- "Let's Go" (1988)
- "Acid Thunder" (1988)
- "Yo Yo Get Funky" (1988)
- "Can U Still Dance" (1988)
- "Hip House" (1988)
- "Jack to the Sound" (1989)
- "Git on Up" feat. Sundance (1989)
- "Most Wanted" (1990)
- "Let's Do This" (1990)
- "Make Some Noise" (1990)
- "Watch Me Git Funky"/"Dance, Rock, Don't Stop" (1991)
- "Bak on da Scene" (1992)
- "No Other Lover" (1993)
- "The Nite Life" feat. Nesha (1993)
- "Girls Get Dum!" with White Knight feat. Juanie (1993)
- "Yeah Yeah Yeah" (1993)
- "Wild N Wet" with White Knight (1994)
- "Booty Call" with DJ Sneak (1994)
- "Pump It" (1995)
- "Doggy Style" (1996)
- "Over and Under (1997)
- "Bang That Thang" (1997)
- "Everything" (1998)
- "I Want You Girl" (1998)
- "Over and Under 2" (1998)
- "Rock Yo Body" feat. Joe Smooth & Max-A-Million (2012)

Featured singles

- "With This Ring Let Me Go" – Molella & Phil Jay present Heaven 17 meets Fast Eddie (1998)
- "Yo Yo (Throw Ya Hands Up)" – Higher And Higher meets Fast Eddie (1998)
- "Throw Your Hands Up (Yo Yo Get Funky - The Sequel)" – Jason Nevins vs. Fast Eddie (1999)
- "Be My Queen" – Molella feat. Fast Eddie (2009)
- "It's the Weekend" – Andrew Friendly feat. Fast Eddie (2009)
- "Let Me Sip My Drink" – Robbie Rivera feat. Fast Eddie (2010)

== Sampling ==
- "Most Wanted" – James Brown "Get on the Good Foot"
- "That's Bad" – Lyn Collins"Think"

== See also ==
- List of number-one dance hits (United States)
- List of artists who reached number one on the US Dance chart

Preceded by "Pump Up the Jam" by Technotronic featuring Felly	"Git on Up" Fast Eddie featuring Sundance; Billboard Hot Dance Club Play number-one single December 2, 1989	Succeeded by "Love on Top of Love" by Grace Jones
