= John Mostyn (music manager) =

- Origin: Cheshire, England (Based in Birmingham)
- Website: Mostyn.net

John Mostyn is a prominent music industry figure in the West Midlands, most notable for managing The Beat and later, Fine Young Cannibals.

Mostyn discovered Detroit based group Inner City, who under his direction had the hits 'Big Fun' and 'Good Life'.

Arguably, Mostyn's most notable success was with Fine Young Cannibals, whom he managed after The Beat separated. With Mostyn as manager the band enjoyed huge success, including a Billboard number 1 album with their album The Raw & the Cooked, which has been certified Platinum 11 times around the world. The band initially had great difficulty securing a recording contract. As described in an interview with John Mostyn : -

"We'd gone, in three months, from every record company rejecting them to every record company wanting them; that's what managers do."

Mostyn is also credited with launching Ocean Colour Scene, via his own Phffft label.

Though not originally from Birmingham Mostyn has spent most of his professional life in Birmingham. He has had considerable influence in the area's music industry, reportedly bringing over £30 million into the local economy. Mostyn was also involved in the launch of 2 Tone Records, as referenced in his biography at mostyn.net : -

"Gerry Dammers of the then unheard of ‘Specials’ bought a copy of their first single to John and announced that he was concerned that they would be able to sell their first pressing of a thousand. John immediately booked the band on a national tour and Chrysalis records picked up the band and the ‘Two Tone’ label. The Two Tone explosion was under way."

Mostyn has recently been working as tour manager for James Hunter.

Mostyn is now running Bob Lamb's (ex-UB40 producer) studio in Birmingham, now known as Highbury Studio. The studio has been used in the past by such notable acts as Duran Duran, Ocean Colour Scene and Stephen Duffy. Currently it hosts some of Birmingham's finest artists such as Ruby Turner, Alternative Dubstep Orchestra, and Goodnight Lenin.

== Associated acts ==
- The Beat
- The Specials
- Fine Young Cannibals
- Inner City
- Ocean Colour Scene
- James Hunter
- Trio Gitano
