= List of Billboard number-one disco singles of 1976 =

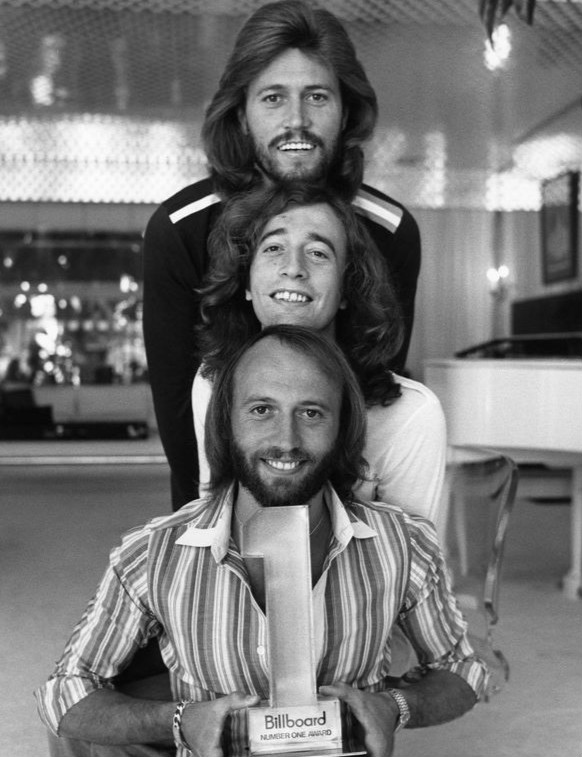
Bee Gees's "You Should Be Dancing" was the first number-one single on the National Disco Action Top 30 chart.

Billboard magazine compiled the top-performing disco singles in the United States on the National Disco Action Top 30 chart. Premiered on the issue dated August 28, the chart ranked the popularity of singles in nightclubs across the country, based on a national survey of club disc jockeys. Previously, Billboard started the Disco Action survey in 1974 which ranked the popularity of singles in New York City discothèques, expanded to feature multiple charts each week which highlighted playlists in various cities such as San Francisco, Boston, Los Angeles, Chicago, Miami, Phoenix, Detroit and Houston. The next year, Billboard′s rival publication Record World was the first to compile a dance chart which incorporated club play on a national level. Billboard statistician Joel Whitburn later "adopted" Record World′s chart data from the weeks between March 29, 1975, and August 21, 1976, into Billboard′s club play history. For the sake of continuity, Record World′s national chart is incorporated into the 1975 and 1976 lists.

== Chart history ==
Issue date	Single	Artist
Record World disco chart data
January 3	"I Love Music"	The O'Jays
January 10	"I Love Music"	The O'Jays
January 17	"Mighty High"	Mighty Clouds of Joy
January 24	"Mighty High"	Mighty Clouds of Joy
January 31	"Mighty High"	Mighty Clouds of Joy
February 7	"Mighty High"	Mighty Clouds of Joy
February 14	"Mighty High"	Mighty Clouds of Joy
February 21	"Movin'"	Brass Construction
February 28	"Movin'"	Brass Construction
March 6	"Movin'"	Brass Construction
March 13	"Movin'"	Brass Construction
March 20	"Turn the Beat Around"	Vicki Sue Robinson
March 27	"Turn the Beat Around"	Vicki Sue Robinson
April 3	"Turn the Beat Around"	Vicki Sue Robinson
April 10	"Turn the Beat Around"	Vicki Sue Robinson
April 17	"Love Hangover"	Diana Ross
April 24	"Love Hangover"	Diana Ross
May 1	"Try Me, I Know We Can Make It"	Donna Summer
May 8	"Try Me, I Know We Can Make It"	Donna Summer
May 15	"Try Me, I Know We Can Make It"	Donna Summer
May 22	"That's Where the Happy People Go"	The Trammps
May 29	"That's Where the Happy People Go"	The Trammps
June 5	"Disco Party"	The Trammps
June 12	"Disco Party"	The Trammps
June 19	"Disco Party"	The Trammps
June 26	"Disco Party"	The Trammps
July 3	"Disco Party"	The Trammps
July 10	"Trouble-Maker"	Roberta Kelly
July 17	"Trouble-Maker"	Roberta Kelly
July 24	"Heaven Must Be Missing an Angel"/ "Don't Take Away the Music"	Tavares
July 31	"Heaven Must Be Missing an Angel"/ "Don't Take Away the Music"	Tavares
August 7	"The Best Disco in Town"	The Ritchie Family
August 14	"You Should Be Dancing"	Bee Gees
August 21	"You Should Be Dancing"	Bee Gees
Billboard National Disco Action Top 30 data
August 28	"You Should Be Dancing"	Bee Gees
September 4	"You Should Be Dancing"	Bee Gees
September 11	"You Should Be Dancing"	Bee Gees
September 18	"You Should Be Dancing"	Bee Gees
September 25	"You Should Be Dancing"	Bee Gees
October 2	"Cherchez La Femme"/ "Sour and Sweet"/ "I'll Play the Fool"	Dr. Buzzard's Original Savannah Band
October 9	"My Sweet Summer Suite"/ "Brazilian Love Song"	The Love Unlimited Orchestra
October 16	"My Sweet Summer Suite"/ "Brazilian Love Song"	The Love Unlimited Orchestra
October 23	"Midnight Love Affair"/ "Crime Don't Pay"	Carol Douglas
October 30	"Down to Love Town"	The Originals
November 6	"My Sweet Summer Suite"/ "Brazilian Love Song"	The Love Unlimited Orchestra
November 13	Four Seasons of Love (all cuts)	Donna Summer
November 20	Four Seasons of Love (all cuts)	Donna Summer
November 27	Four Seasons of Love (all cuts)	Donna Summer
December 4	Four Seasons of Love (all cuts)	Donna Summer
December 11	Four Seasons of Love (all cuts)	Donna Summer
December 18	Four Seasons of Love (all cuts)	Donna Summer
December 25	"Don't Leave Me This Way"/ "Any Way You Like It"	Thelma Houston

== See also ==
- 1976 in music
- List of Billboard Hot 100 number ones of 1976
