= We're Only Human =

We're Only Human may refer to:

- We're Only Human (film), 1935 American film directed by James Flood
- We're Only Human (band), a 1980s British powerpop and rock band
