= John Mostyn =

John Mostyn may refer to:

- John Mostyn (MP for Flintshire) (died 1644), Welsh politician
- John Mostyn (British Army officer) (1710–1779), British governor of Minorca, 1768–1778
- John Mostyn (music manager), English music manager
- John Harold Mostyn (1887–1956), Lord Mayor of Sydney and rugby league administrator
