= Pennies from Heaven =

Pennies from Heaven may refer to:

- "Pennies from Heaven" (song), 1936 popular song originated by Bing Crosby
  - Pennies from Heaven, the second disc of the 1962 Bing Crosby box set Bing's Hollywood
- Pennies from Heaven (1936 film), starring Bing Crosby and Madge Evans, introducing the song
- Pennies from Heaven (TV series), 1978 BBC drama by Dennis Potter
- Pennies from Heaven (1981 film), musical starring Steve Martin and Bernadette Peters, based on the BBC TV series
- "Pennies from Heaven" (Inner City song), 1992
