= What Cha Gonna Do with My Lovin' (song) =

1979 single by Stephanie Mills

- US twelve-inch 33 1/3-RPM single

Single by Stephanie Mills

from the album What Cha Gonna Do with My Lovin'
- B-side: "Put Your Body in It"
- Released: July 1979
- Recorded: 1978
- Genre: Disco; funk
- Length: 8:03 (12"); 4:06 (7")
- Label: 20th Century-Fox Records
- Songwriters: Reggie Lucas; James Mtume
- Producers: James Mtume; Reggie Lucas

Stephanie Mills singles chronology
"This Empty Place" (1976)	"What Cha Gonna Do with My Lovin'" (1979)	"You Can Get Over" (1979)

Performance video
- "What Cha Gonna Do with My Lovin' " by Stephanie Mills on YouTube

"What Cha Gonna Do with My Lovin'" is a song by American singer and songwriter Stephanie Mills, released in July 1979 by 20th Century-Fox Records as the first single from the album of the same name (1979). It became a hit, reaching No. 22 on the US Billboard Hot 100. The song was also a top-10 hit on the Billboard R&B chart, as well as a minor hit in Canada.

== Track listing and formats ==
- US 12" Vinyl single

A. "What Cha Gonna Do with My Lovin'" – 8:02
B. "Put Your Body in It" – 6:00

- Australia 7" Vinyl single

A. "What Cha Gonna Do with My Lovin'" – 3:35
B. "Starlight" – 3:30

- UK 7" Vinyl single

A. "Put Your Body in It" – 6:00
B. "What Cha Gonna Do with My Lovin'" – 3:35

- Germany 7" Vinyl single

A. "What Cha Gonna Do with My Lovin'" – 4:05
B. "Put Your Body in It" – 5:02

== Personnel ==
- Stephanie Mills – vocals
- Reggie Lucas – guitars
- Harry Whitaker, Hubert Eaves III – keyboards
- James Mtume – percussion
- Reggie Lucas, James Mtume – producer

== Charts ==
Chart (1979)	Peak position
Canada Top Singles (RPM)	82
US Billboard Hot 100	22
US Hot R&B/Hip-Hop Songs (Billboard)	8

== Inner City version ==
"Whatcha Gonna Do with My Lovin'"
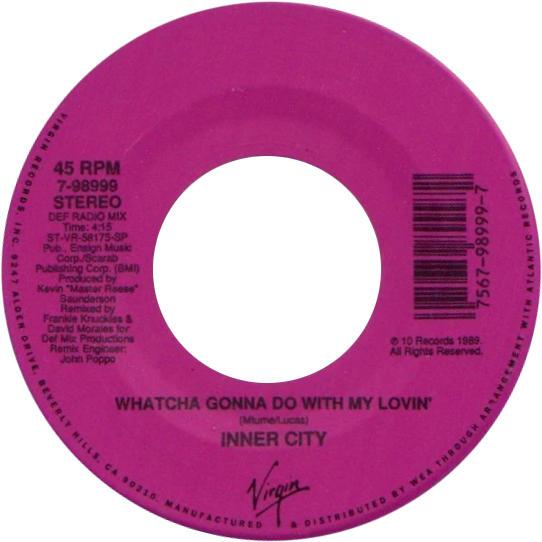

Single by Inner City

from the album Paradise (UK) Big Fun (US)
- B-side: "Set Your Body Free"
- Released: November 1989
- Recorded: 1989
- Genre: Disco; funk
- Label: Virgin
- Songwriters: Reggie Lucas; James Mtume

Inner City singles chronology
"Do You Love What You Feel" (1989)	"Whatcha Gonna Do with My Lovin'" (1989)	"That Man (He's All Mine)" (1990)

In 1989, the song was recorded by American dance group Inner City. It was released in November by Virgin Records as the group's fifth single and their fifth consecutive UK top 20 hit, reaching No. 12. Along with "Good Life", this is the only other Inner City song to make the US Billboard Hot 100 chart, peaking at No. 76. While all the group's previous singles had topped the Hot Dance Music/Club Play chart in the US, this was the first not to do so, although it still reached No. 8.

=== Critical reception ===
David Stubbs from Melody Maker wrote about the song, "A bit subdued, a bit derivative, a bit like Chaka Khan feeling a bit faint after a month on the Cambridge diet." Ian McCann from NME felt it "is the usual Kevin Saunderson sound slowed down 15 beats a minute. Paris is in her usual seductive self, but can Inner City hit with an Mtume song at his slack tempo and not theirs?" Chris Heath from Smash Hits remarked that the song "is quite different" from their earlier singles, "and is much more subtle, a bit like Soul II Soul in fact."

=== Charts ===
Chart (1989–90)	Peak position
Australia (ARIA)	86
Finland (Suomen virallinen lista)	22
Ireland (IRMA)	24
Luxembourg (Radio Luxembourg)	12
Netherlands (Dutch Top 40)	9
Netherlands (Single Top 100)	12
UK Singles (OCC)	12
US Billboard Hot 100	76
US Disco/Dance (Billboard)	8
US Cash Box Top 100	77
