= This Is Acid =

Single by Maurice with Hot Hands Hula
- Released: 1988
- Recorded: 1987
- Genre: Chicago house; acid house
- Length: 4:38 (radio edit version)
- Label: Vendetta/A&M
- Songwriter(s): Hula Mahone; Lidell Townsell
- Producer(s): Hot Hands Hula; Les Adams

"This Is Acid", also known by its full title, "This Is Acid (A New Dance Craze)", is a song by Chicago house music DJ and producer Maurice Joshua, who recorded the track under his first name "Maurice". It reached number one on the Billboard Hot Dance Club Play chart in April 1989 and stayed there for two weeks.

The song contains spoken lyrics performed by male singer "Hot Hands" Hula Mahone. The lyrics introduce the listener to the Chicago acid house sound.

"This Is Acid (A New Dance Craze)" is Joshua's only hit single, but he continued as a producer and remixer, winning a Grammy Award in 2004 for his remix of Beyoncé's "Crazy in Love".

== Versions ==
The original 4:56 version—made with only a Roland TR-808 drum machine, Roland TB-303 bass synthesizer, reverb, and vocals—was first released as a B-side track on the Maurice Joshua with Hot Hands Hula single "I Gotta Big Dick" in 1988, and only Mahone and producer Lidell Townsell were given writing credits.

When the song was later released as a separate single, the artist name was changed to just Maurice and the song was subtitled "A New Dance Craze". Most editions featured only sample-laden Les Adams remixes, by taking the vocals, adding a synth lead from Black Riot's "A Day in the Life", using the rhythm synth from Inner City's "Big Fun", numerous samples from Todd Terry's records, and repeated use of sirens and sexual screams in the background. These releases didn't mention Mahone or Townsell; they only credited Joshua as the only producer and writer, plus Les Adams and keyboardist Mike Stevens for the remixes. This version would later be included in the Trax Records' 20th Anniversary compilation set in 2006.

== In popular culture ==
Joshua and Mahone performed "This Is Acid" under the billing "Maurice & the Posse" during a March 1989 appearance on Dance Party USA.

"This Is Acid" was covered by German duo VooDoo & Serano off their album Radikal Techno 6.

The song can be heard in the video game Grand Theft Auto: San Andreas on the in-game radio station SF-UR.

== Track listings ==
=== Original version ===
(on Maurice Joshua with Hot Hands Hula – "I Gotta Big Dick" – Trax Records TX169):

- A1 – "I Gotta Big Dick" (6:20)
- A2 – "I Gotta Big Dick (Instrumental)" (5:23)
- B1 – "This Is Acid" (4:56)
- B2 – "Feel the Mood" (4:15)

=== 12" maxi (US) ===
(on Maurice – "This Is Acid (A New Dance Craze)" – Vendetta Records VE-7016):

- A1 – "This Is Acid (A New Dance Craze) (S & T Mix)" (7:22)
- A2 – "This Is Acid (A New Dance Craze) (Deep Dub)" (5:58)
- B – "This Is Acid (A New Dance Craze) (K & T Mix)" (6:24)
