= Fire (Inner City album) =

1990 album by Inner City

Studio album by Inner City
- Released: 1990
- Genre: Electronica; house; Detroit techno
- Label: 10
- Producer: Kevin Saunderson

Inner City chronology
Paradise (1989)	Fire (1990)	Praise (1992)

Singles from Fire
- 1. "That Man (He's All Mine)" Released: 1990; 2. "Till We Meet Again" Released: 1991

Professional ratings
Review scores
Source	Rating
AllMusic	3/5 stars
Chicago Tribune	3/4 stars

Fire is the second album by Detroit-based electronic music duo Inner City, released in 1990. Two singles were released from the album: "That Man (He's All Mine)" and "Till We Meet Again".

== Critical reception ==
AllMusic editor Alex Henderson felt the album provides "such inspired, gospel-influenced house music treasures", as "My Heart's Not Here with You", "Lovelight", "What Does It Take", and "That Man (He's All Mine)". He complimented Paris Grey as "a singer of depth and substance" and Kevin Saunderson as "an inventive, distinctive producer", and also highlighted "Hallelujah" and "Unity" as "fine examples of the uplifting "love/peace/togetherness" theme". Greg Kot from Chicago Tribune noted that Ten City crooner Byron Stingily and rappers 2 the Hardway "steal the show" as guest stars on the "R&B-flavored" "Till We Meet Again" and the "sassy Janet Jackson-like" "What Does It Take". He added that Grey's "sensual voice" is perfect for cuts such as "Hallelujah," "Unity" and the galloping "Fire".

== Track listing ==
1. "Innovators" — 3:01
2. "That Man (He's All Mine)" — 3:08
3. "Fire" — 3:53
4. "My Heart's Not Here with You" — 4:48
5. "Hallelujah" — 3:23
6. "Lovelight" — 4:11
7. "Till We Meet Again" — 5:18
8. "Vibes" — 3:44
9. "What Does It Take" — 3:33
10. "Unity" — 3:24
