= Incredible Kidda Band =

British power pop band

The Incredible Kidda Band (aka The Kidda Band) were a British power pop band formed in Nuneaton on 10 February 1976, and composed of Alan Hammonds (guitars, vocals), Graham "Kidder" Hammonds (percussion, backing vocals), Dave 'Legs' Lister, (lead guitar, backing vocals], John Rollason (guitar, backing vocals), Les Rollason (bass), Graham "Dick" Millington (drums). Later members of the band were Mark "Tarky" Bates (drums, backing vocals), Keith Taylor (bass), Mick Rollason (guitar, backing vocals) and Paul Gardner (drums).

== Career ==
The Incredible Kidda Band signed to Psycho Records on 19 January 1978 and their first powerpop single was released on 24 June that year. "Everybody Knows" backed with "No Nerve" were both written by Horden born Alan Hammonds and were recorded in London at Utopia Studios, and engineered by Andy Brook Jackson. Jackson later began work as an engineer for Pink Floyd in 1980, assisting in the live recording of The Wall at Earls Court, the film soundtrack for The Wall and the studio album The Final Cut. Jackson has since worked on all of David Gilmour's recordings/multimedia projects as an engineer and/or co-producer since 1984 and he also engineered Roger Waters' first solo album.

Members of the band were unhappy with the work of producer Des Dolan and so both tracks were remixed at Utopia Studios on 11 May at 1978. The band remained unhappy.

The single was reviewed in Melody Maker on 15 July 1978 by the producer Tony Visconti, famous for working with David Bowie, Marc Bolan and T-Rex as well as Thin Lizzy, and he wrote "Great!! A good record at last. Good solid beat and the group actually sings in tune. This could chart (as they say in the biz). They sound young but aren't quite punk or new wave. I commend them for keeping their sound strong, simple and uncluttered." Other positive reviews appeared in Sounds on 5 August 1978 (By Geoff Barton), "Expect them to sign to CBS any day now" and in Record Mirror on 9 August 1978 (By Rosalind Russell).

Despite the favourable reviews, the single failed to sell in large numbers upon its release, however it was destined to become a collector's item over 20 years later.

On 31 August 1978, the band was signed to Carrere Records by Peter Hinton, later to become the Producer of Wheels of Steel released in 1980 by heavy metal label mates Saxon. At the same time as the move of record company, the name was shortened to the Kidda Band.

The Kidda Band's first live performance in London took place at The Rock Garden in Covent Garden on 1 September 1978 and five coaches of fans travelled from Nuneaton to support them.

The band was already a very well regarded live act across the UK and in late 1978 they were signed to Birmingham based OAK music booking agency run by John Mostyn. John Mostyn later became the manager of many successful UK acts, such as The Beat, Fine Young Cannibals and Ocean Colour Scene.

The band were always a favourite choice at Radio 1 live events, and they shared the stage with Peter Powell, Paul Gambaccini and David "Kid" Jensen in their career.

The debut single release for Carrere was released on 29 June 1979 and was a double A-sided single featuring "Fighting my way back" and "Saturday Night Fever". The latter was written as a direct attack on the motion picture Saturday Night Fever which starred John Travolta and featured the music of the Bee Gees and which heavily influenced the UK music charts and live music venues at that time.

Both songs were recorded at Radio Luxembourg Studios on 14 and 15 December 1978 and both songs were once again written by Alan Hammonds. The sessions were engineered by Peter Hughes and co-produced by Graham "Kidder" Hammonds. The same team were to remix both tracks at the same studio on 1 May 1979.

During 1979, the Kidda Band were to support a number of established and emerging bands such as The Troggs, The Pirates, the Radio Stars and The Beat as their reputation for powerful live performances continued to grow.

On 11 September 1979, the band signed to talent management company "March Music/Fast Western Productions", founded and run by former Ten Years After drummer Ric Lee, prior to the release of their second Carrere single.

Muriel Young invited the band to appear on Get it together to promote the debut single. Muriel, the show's Producer, was a strong supporter of the band and she was to use the band again later that same series to promote their second single. The band entered Granada TV Recording studios on 13 November to record the soundtrack before filming both sides of the new single the following day.

The band's TV debut was broadcast on Granada television 4 December 1979. They were to appear regularly on the show thereafter until their demise.

The band's third single was recorded on 14 January 1980 at Chas Chandler's Portland Recording Studios, previously a member of The Animals, and manager of Jimi Hendrix, Slade and Nick Drake, and home to Barn Records. The session was engineered by Andy "Pugwash" Miller and produced by Mark Robbins.

At the time, Portland Recording Studios was also home to George "Porky" Peckham's cutting rooms, whose master discs, and the records produced from them, were known as "Porky Prime Cuts". George was previously cutting engineer at Apple Records for The Beatles. Both sides of the single were subsequently cut by George, and the run-out groove on both sides of the single has his classic motto, "A Porky Prime Cut", etched into it.

Once again, on 29 January 1980, the band entered Granada television's recording studio to re-record the single ready for their second Get it together appearance. The show itself was filmed on 30 January and broadcast on 19 February 1980.

On 31 January 1980, the band were offered the support slot on The Skids 1980 Tour and the prospect of wider recognition were heightened.

On 4 February 1980 the band's third single was released, and their second on Carrere Records, featuring "Get off the telephone" and backed with "Big boys don't cry". Once again both songs were written by Alan Hammonds. The Record Mirror review said the single "recreate(d) the sound of the late, great Glitter Band matched up with the hooks and teen appeal of the early Rollers".

On 13 February the support slot on tour with The Skids was cancelled as Carrere Records decided not to support it and relations with the label suffered as a result. On 3 March 1980, Mark "Tarky" Bates replaced Paul Gardener on drums.

The band continued to tour the UK extensively and on 17 May 1980 a live review appeared in the first volume/second edition of the independent rock weekly New Music News in which writer Paul Bearer extolled the virtues of their live performance and song writing prowess. "One day some musicologist is going to light up Alan Hammonds songbook and it'll be rather like the discovery of the Dead Sea Scrolls because nestling in those pages are some of the best pop songs to have been written over the past few years. Direct, melodic, a rough hewn commerciality wrapped around incisive and sharp lyrics with more than a touch of cheek thrown in for good measure: those are the qualities of the compositions. The Kidda Band play with punch and panache, putting more media- mirrored bands such as The Jags and the appalling The Knack, well and truly in the shade."

On 9 September 1980, they made their debut at London's The Venue alongside Jess Roden. Around that time Music Week said the band were "attracting interest from music business quarters other than Carrere."

On 1 October 1980, the Kidda Band left Carrere Records, with the alleged lack of record label support and investment being cited as the chief reason. Despite label mates Saxon gaining support slots on tour with more established bands such as Motörhead, no such tours were secured for the power pop band and their relationship with the record label rapidly deteriorated. The lack of plans for a debut album was also alleged to be a major contributory factor.

Just two weeks later, on 15 October 1980, the band were signed by Blue Chip/Cygnet Records, the new label run by record producer Rodger Bain, who had previously produced the single "Paranoid" for Black Sabbath, which entered the UK Singles Chart in July 1970 at Number 2.

1981 also saw the release of the band's fourth single, "If looks could kill" and "Don't she look F-A-B" produced by Spencer Shiroda. The single was cut at Strawberry Mastering which was owned by members of 10cc at that time. Despite healthy airplay, the sales of the single were once again disappointing and the band left Blue Chip Records on 28 April 1981.

Later that year the band played Avery Hill College, which was incorporated into the University of Greenwich in 1985, and the show was recorded for a possible live album release, but to date this recording has never surfaced.

In September 1982 the band entered Alaska Studios with engineer Pat Collier, previously of The Vibrators to record several new tracks including "I want You".

They continued to be a powerful live act "playing endless helpings of meat and potatoes rock n' roll garnished with delicate touches of 70's glitter" and "they ha(d) the ability of combining the no nonsense rawness of The Clash with the pop sensibility of classic Mott the Hoople."

The band continued to perform live and made regular studio visits, including to Denmark Street Studios on 22 January 1984 to record several live favourites such as "Hold my head up high".

On 10 November 1984 the band performed live at University of Essex in support of Orange Juice featuring Edwyn Collins.

Having played regularly at The Bridgehouse in Canning Town, the band hooked up with the owner/promoter Terry Murphy's own Vinyl Cuts Record label to release their fifth single, "Hold your head up high" and "I wouldn't treat a dog (Like you treat me)", in June 1985. Murphy was also manager of Wasted Youth and father to boxer turned TV actor Glen Murphy.

The single was recorded at Village Recorders on 19 March 1985 with the session being produced by their own Graham "Kidder" Hammonds and engineered by Gary Edwards. Both sides of the single were once again cut by George "Porky" Peckham and the run-out groove on both sides of the single have his classic motto, "A Porky Prime Cut", etched into them.

The band experienced several name changes, beginning with the shortening of the name to the Kidda Band before changing name completely to "The Kicks" on 7 November 1979 and finally to "We're Only Human" on 1 July 1981.

On 23 September 1985, the contract with March Music expired with neither Ric Lee nor the band taking up the option to continue working together.

In 1987 guitarist John Rollason took time out from the band to record the Dirty Strangers album with the Dirty Strangers and he was joined in the studio by Paul Fox, formerly of The Ruts, Keith Richards and Ronnie Wood. The album was produced by Prince Stanislas "Stash" Kosslowski de Rola.

The Kidda Band finally disbanded in 1989.

In 1999 Record Collector magazine identified numerous record collectors willing to purchase the debut single "Everybody Knows" for as much as £400 and the record continues to be a collector's item, particularly in the United States and Japan.

In 2000, due to this public demand for their back catalogue, the debut album, "Too Much Too Little Too Late" was released on Detour Records. The double album contained 29 tracks and featured both studio and demo recordings. The album received favourable reviews from across the world, particularly in Record Collector magazine - "The fame never came, but this album/CD rightly puts the Kidda Band's melodic punk tunes back on the map."

In 2002 the first four singles were repackaged and re-released by the Japanese independent punk and power pop record label, 1977 Records. All four sold out quickly.

On 24 February 2006, Alan Hammonds and Dave Lister were featured on "Pop into The Past" with Pete Chambers on BBC CWR.

On 28 March 2007, "Pop 'til you drop", the lyric book to accompany the album "Too Much Too Little Too Late" was published by Lulu. The album itself was also re-released on 20 June 2007 by the band's own "Black and Blue Records" label through "Detour Records".

In 2007, "Sign on the dotted line" was re-recorded by the "Teenage Frames".

In 2008, "If looks could kill" was re-recorded by New York-based Baby Shakes and the song continues to be part of their live repertoire. This was followed by "The Brothers Gross" versions of "I'm gonna join the army" and "We're gonna make it". Many other cover versions continue to surface.

During 2011, Last Laugh Records from New York released a series of single releases of Kidda Band material including the unreleased "Radio Caroline" and "(Watch out) Thief" plus a reissue of "Everybody Knows".

In December 2011, Red Lounge Records from Germany released a vinyl version of the "Too Much Too Little Too Late" album in a repackaged format.

In 2012 Last Laugh Records also re-released "Fighting My Way Back" and the unreleased "Bitch/She's a 50".

"Made In England (CD)", their second album of previously unreleased recordings, was released on 30 October 2014 on Black and Blue Records (UK).

On 4 April 2016 Last Laugh Records released a double A sided single "The Girls Said No" / "Bullet in my heart" which were both original recordings which were previously unreleased as singles.

On 1 July 2024, Austria's Bachelor Records released two double A sided singles, "If looks could kill/Don't she look F-A-B" (BR-135) and "I wouldn't treat a dog/Hold your head up high" (BR-136) and then followed up these with two more, "Can I take the car tonight/Major Tom" (BR-137) and "I'm gonna join the army now/Wait till your father gets home" (BR-138) on 31 October 2025, the latter two singles containing original recordings which were previously unreleased as singles.

== Discography ==
=== Singles ===
- "Everybody Knows" / "No Nerve" (6 May 1978) – Psycho P2608
- "Fighting My Way Back" / "Saturday Night Fever" (11 October 1979) – Carrere Records CAR119
- "Get off the telephone" / "Big boys don't cry" (7 March 1980) – Carrere Records CAR138
- "If looks could kill" / "Don't she look F-A-B" (21 August 1981) – Blue Chip/Cygnet BC102
- "Hold your head up high" / "I wouldn't treat a dog" (7 June 1985) – Vinyl Cuts Records VC002
- "Everybody Knows/No Nerve" (1 November 2002) – 1977 Records S045
- "Fighting My Way Back" / "Saturday Night Fever" (8 November 2002) – 1977 Records S046
- "Get off the telephone" / "Big boys don't cry" (15 November 2002) – 1977 Records S047
- "If looks could kill" / "Don't she look F-A-B" (22 November 2002) – 1977 Records S048
- "Radio Caroline" / "We're gonna make it" (25 March 2011) – Last Laugh Records HAW011
- "Everybody Knows" / "No Nerve" (22 July 2011) – Last Laugh Records HAW010
- "(Watch Out) Thief" / "You Belong To Me" (2 December 2011) – Last Laugh Records HAW017
- "Fighting My Way Back" / "Saturday Night Fever" (7 April 2012) – Last Laugh Records HAW021
- "Bitch" / "She's a 50" (8 November 2012) – Last Laugh Records HAW025
- "Girl Said No" / "Bullet in my heart" ( 4 April 2016) – Last Laugh Records HAW037
- "If looks could kill" / "Don't she look F-A-B" ( 1 July 2024) – Bachelor Records BR-135
- "I wouldn't treat a dog" / "Hold your head up high" (1 July 2024) – Bachelor Records BR-136
- "Can I take the car tonight" / "Major Tom" ( 31 October 2025) – Bachelor Records BR-137
- "I'm gonna join the army now" / "Wait till your father gets home" (31 October 2025) – Bachelor Records BR-138
- "****Release coming soon****" / "****Release coming soon****" (TBC 2026) – Bachelor Records BR-139
- "****Release coming soon****" / "****Release coming soon****" (TBC 2026) – Bachelor Records BR-140

=== Albums ===
- Too Much Too Little Too Late (CD)(19 June 2000) Detour Records DRCD 023
- Too Much Too Little Too Late (Vinyl)(19 June 2000) Detour Records DRLP 023
- Too Much Too Little Too Late (CD Reissue) (20 June 2007) Detour Records DRCD 023
- Too Much Too Little Too Late (Vinyl – Repackaged) (1 December 2011) Red Lounge Records RLR095
- Too Much Too Little Too Late (Vinyl – Re-release) (8 September 2014) Red Lounge Records RLR095
- Made In England (CD) (30 October 2014) Black and Blue Records (UK)BNBCD002
- Anthology (planned early 2026 Black and Blue Records (UK))
- Live album (planned early 2026 Black and Blue Records (UK))

== See also ==
- Music of the United Kingdom (2000s)
- Music of the United Kingdom (1980s)
- Music of the United Kingdom (1970s)
