= That's Where the Happy People Go =

Single by the Trammps

from the album Where the Happy People Go
- Released: March 3, 1976
- Recorded: 1975
- Studio: Sigma Sound, Philadelphia, Pennsylvania
- Genre: R&B, disco
- Length: 3:14
- Label: Atlantic
- Songwriter(s): Ronald Baker

The Trammps singles chronology
"Rubber Band" (1976)	"That's Where the Happy People Go" (1976)	"Disco Party" (1976)

"That's Where the Happy People Go" is a crossover single by Philadelphia-based disco group the Trammps. Released in December 1975, the single hit number one on the disco chart for two weeks in May 1976. "That's Where the Happy People Go" also reached number twelve on the soul chart and number twenty-seven on the Hot 100. Outside the US, "That's Where the Happy People Go" went to number thirty-five in the UK.

== Chart positions ==
Chart (1976)	Peak position
U.S. Billboard Hot 100	27
U.S. Billboard Disco File Top 20	1
U.S. Billboard Hot Black Singles	12
