= Tommy Onyx =

Tommy Onyx (born May 7, 1972) is a musician from Detroit, Michigan. He is best known as the producer of Inner City's 1999 remix of Good Life, which made #10 on the UK Singles Chart.

== Career ==
He moved to Detroit from Boston in 1988 and soon came to local prominence as keyboard player with the Alt Rock band The Charm Farm. Throughout the 1990s he served as the music director for the techno group Inner City. He co-wrote many of the band's iconic songs including "Hallelujah," the title track from the band's second album "Fire" and most recently 2014's "Bad Girl," a tribute to Donna Summer. In 1998 his Spanish language remix of Inner City's 1988 hit Good Life, "Buena Vida" reached #10 on the UK singles chart.

Onyx has also done world tours as the Music Director for E Dancer and Norma Jean Bell. In 1999, Onyx founded Loudbaby, a progressive web design and development company.

== Awards ==
He was twice voted Best Keyboardist in 1992 and 1993 at the Detroit Music Awards. He was nominated for Outstanding Electronic Writer/Producer in 2000 (Detroit Music Awards.)
