= Sundance (rapper) =

American rapper

Ericka Campbell, better known as Sundance, is an American rapper, DJ and radio personality.

She took up DJing with a relative, and in the late 1980s recorded a house record with Fast Eddie, "Git On Up", that was certified Gold by RIAA and Billboard.

== See also ==
- List of number-one dance hits (United States)
- List of artists who reached number one on the US Dance chart
