= TG Collective =

- TG Collective 2010

Background information
- Origin: Birmingham, England
- Genres: Flamenco, Gypsy jazz, jazz, world music, contemporary classical music
- Years active: 2006–present
- Labels: Stoney Lane, The Birds Recording Company
- Members: Jamie Fekete; Sam Slater; Percy Pursglove; Holly Jones; Lluis Mather; Kit Massey; Joelle Barker
- Website: Official site

TG Collective are an eclectic British-based ensemble, evolving from the successful acoustic guitar trio, Trio Gitano, in 2006. The TG Collective are based in Birmingham, England. Their sound draws on many influences, in particular Flamenco, Gypsy Jazz, Jazz and contemporary Classical music, with interchanging shapes and sizes of ensemble within a performance. The group is centered on two guitarists, set alongside a core of double bass, flute and violin and percussion, whilst also featuring flamenco dance in some performances.

The band issued an album, Release the Penguins, in 2012, their first since their previous 2005 release as Trio Gitano. Release The Penguins has received plaudits from The Sunday Times, Jazzwise, Songlines, FRoots, Time Out and Yahoo. The album has been played internationally, including BBC Radio 3 to KEXP-FM in Seattle, USA. Having toured extensively around the UK, TG Collective have appeared several times at the Cheltenham Jazz Festival; Kings Place, London; live on BBC One television; Jamie Oliver's Big Feastival; the Manchester Jazz Festival; a live session for Jazz FM and London's Pizza Express Jazz Club in Soho, in addition to touring in Ireland, France, Spain, Serbia and Bulgaria.

== Members ==
- Jamie Fekete (guitars)
- Sam Slater (guitars, oud)
- Percy Pursglove (double bass, trumpet)
- Holly Jones (flute, alto flute)
- Lluis Mather (clarinet, bass clarinet)
- Kit Massey (violin)
- Joelle Barker (cajon, riq, percussion)

== Trio Gitano 2001–2006 ==
The UK based acoustic guitar trio Trio Gitano was formed in 2001 by three 'graduate' members of the Birmingham School's Guitar Ensemble – Sam Slater, Jamie Fekete and Sophie Johnson.

The Trio was directed by composer, pianist and guitarist Bryan Lester, who still writes for The TG Collective. After performing together throughout their time together at The University of Birmingham, the Trio signed to The Birds Recording Company indie label in 2004 to release their debut album – Who Ate All The Tapas? in August 2005, and was voted as one of the Records of the Year by The Sunday Times. The album also received notable reviews in The Times, Jazzwise Magazine, Songlines Magazine, The Metro and coverage on BBC Radios 3 and 4.

During the summer of 2006, Sophie Johnson left the Trio, with multi-instrumentalist Percy Pursglove joining the group, adding new dynamic drive and direction on double bass, which paved the way for the formation and basis of the TG Collective in September 2006. Pursglove had previously studied jazz at Birmingham Conservatoire and The New School in New York.

The act later broke up as Bryan Lester died from inflammation in 2021.

== Associated acts ==
- Percy Pursglove
- Joelle Barker
- Kit Massey
- Lluis Mather
- Sam Slater
- The Destroyers
- Katy Carr

== Awards ==
- Who Ate All The Tapas? was No.4 in the Sunday Times' Records of the Year in 2005

== Discography ==
- Who Ate All the Tapas? Trio Gitano (Birds, 2005)
- Release the Penguins (Stoney Lane, 2012)
