= Maurice Joshua =

American musician

- Also known as: Mo
- Origin: Illinois, U.S.
- Genres: Electronic; nu soul
- Years active: 1980s–present

Maurice Joshua (born in Chicago, Illinois), usually credited under the name Maurice, is an American record producer. His single "This Is Acid (A New Dance Craze)" (1988), reached number one on the Billboard Hot Dance Club Play chart in April 1989 and stayed there for two weeks. Joshua first came to prominence with the underground early house track "I Got A Big Dick" (1988). Though that was his only hit single, he has been nominated for three Grammy Awards for remixes, and his remix of Beyoncé's "Crazy in Love", known as "Krazy in Luv" (Maurice's Nu Soul Mix), won the Grammy Award for Best Remixed Recording, Non-Classical for 2003.
