= Pennies from Heaven (Inner City song) =

Single by Inner City

from the album Praise
- Released: June 1, 1992
- Genre: Deep house; techno
- Length: 4:21
- Songwriters: Kevin Saunderson; Paris Grey
- Producer: Kevin Saunderson

Inner City singles chronology
"Let It Reign" (1991)	"Pennies from Heaven" (1992)	"Follow Your Heart" (1992)

Music video
- "Pennies from Heaven" on YouTube

"Pennies from Heaven" is a song by American electronic music group Inner City, released on June 1st, 1992 as the third single from their fourth album, Praise (1992). Despite the title, it is not a cover of the 1936 song of the same name. It is written by group members Kevin Saunderson and Paris Grey, and produced by Saunderson. The song became the duo's fifth and final number-one single on the US Billboard Hot Dance Club Play chart, reaching the top of the chart in August 1992 for two weeks. In the UK, it peaked at number 24 on the UK Singles Chart, while reaching number two on the Music Week Dance Singles chart. The accompanying music video featured people from all walks of life being invited by the duo for what will be a final meal, which at the end of the video resembled a portrait of The Last Supper. British magazine Mixmag ranked "Pennies from Heaven" number 62 in its "100 Greatest Dance Singles Of All Time" list in 1996.

== Critical reception ==
Larry Flick from Billboard magazine wrote, "After teasing U.S. club DJs with several tasty imports over the past few months, Detroit duo finally unleashes this slammin' deep houser domestically. Paris Grey is in fine voice, rising above a textured arrangement that's lightly shaded with techno nuances. A major hit in the offing." A writer from Mixmag described it as a "beautiful, joyous hymn to universal love and peace." Dele Fadele from New Musical Express found that "Paris Grey's spirited vocal and the Utopian sentiment save 'Pennies from Heaven' from the doldrums. You'll be saying your 'Hallelujahs' when a serious Gospel element creeps into the latter half of the 'Tunnel Mix Edit' while pop-haters search out the rare club mixes." Andy Beevers from Music Week named the song Pick of the Week in the category of Dance, complimenting its "irresistible combination of banging beats and soulful vocals".

== Impact and legacy ==
British dance music record producer and DJ Mark Moore named "Pennies from Heaven" one of his favourites in 1995, saying, "Inner City are one of my favourite bands. This record never fails to move me with Paris Gray's vocals, brilliant piano and the message. It's really uplifting and uniting."

British magazine Mixmag ranked the song number 62 in its "100 Greatest Dance Singles Of All Time" list in 1996.

== Charts ==
=== Weekly charts ===
Chart (1992)	Peak position
Australia (ARIA)	122
UK Singles (OCC)	24
UK Dance (Music Week)	2
UK Club Chart (Music Week)	1
US Hot Dance Club Play (Billboard)	1

=== Year-end charts ===
Chart (1992)	Position
UK Club Chart (Music Week)	7

== See also ==
- List of number-one dance singles of 1992 (U.S.)
