= Ann Saunderson =

British dance music singer (born 1967)

- Born: 30 December 1967 (age 57)
- Origin: Birmingham, England
- Genres: House, soul
- Years active: 1987–present
- Labels: Global Underground Ltd.
- Website: Myspace

Ann Saunderson (born Ann Karen Joy Nanton in Birmingham) is a British dance music singer.

== Biography ==
=== Early career ===
Ann Nanton met Kevin Saunderson when she went to join her older sister Judy in London in 1987 (Judy was already a session singer). Soon afterward, she married him and moved to the US, appearing on several of his recordings as a vocalist. She also recorded under the aliases Surreal and Karen Joy, and was lead vocalist of dance group Kaos. She also worked with Inner City, her husband's group.

=== Career ===
One of Saunderson's most known contributions to Inner City was its 1992 hit, "Pennies from Heaven". As Sürreal, in 1994 Saunderson covered "Pearls" (from the Love Deluxe album) by Sade. The late 1990s were rather inactive, and it was only in 2000 that Saunderson began to record with new acts. In the early 2000s, she worked with American techno group Octave One. She provided guest vocals on two of its single releases, "Blackwater" and "Somedays". All of these projects were large club hits and had great critical success, especially the former. Saunderson also featured on tracks on Octave One's debut album. Additionally, she provided vocals for singles by Slam ("Lie to Me", 2004), Dave Lee ("You're Not Alone", 2006), Notenshun ("Move a Little Closer", 2007), and Andre Crom & Chi Thanh ("These Walls", 2014).

== Discography ==
With Kaos

- "Definition of Love" (1989)
- "Gonna Get Over U" (1990)
- "Freedom of Choice" (1995)

As Karen Joy

- "Talk to Me" (1992)

As Surreal

- "Happiness"
- "Pearls" (1994)

As Ann Saunderson

- "Blackwater" (Octave One featuring Ann Saunderson) (2001) - UK #47
- "Blackwater" (remix) (Octave One featuring Ann Saunderson) (2002) - UK #69
- "Lie to Me" (Slam featuring Ann Saunderson) (2004)
- "Somedays" (Octave One featuring Ann Saunderson) (2005)
- "You're Not Alone" (Dave Lee featuring Ann Saunderson) (2006)
- "Move a Little Closer" (Notenshun featuring Ann Saunderson) (2007)
- "Lose Yourself" (Surkin featuring Ann Saunderson) (2011)
- "R.L.H." (Supernova featuring Ann Saunderson) (2013)
