= Big Fun (Inner City song) =

1988 single by Inner City

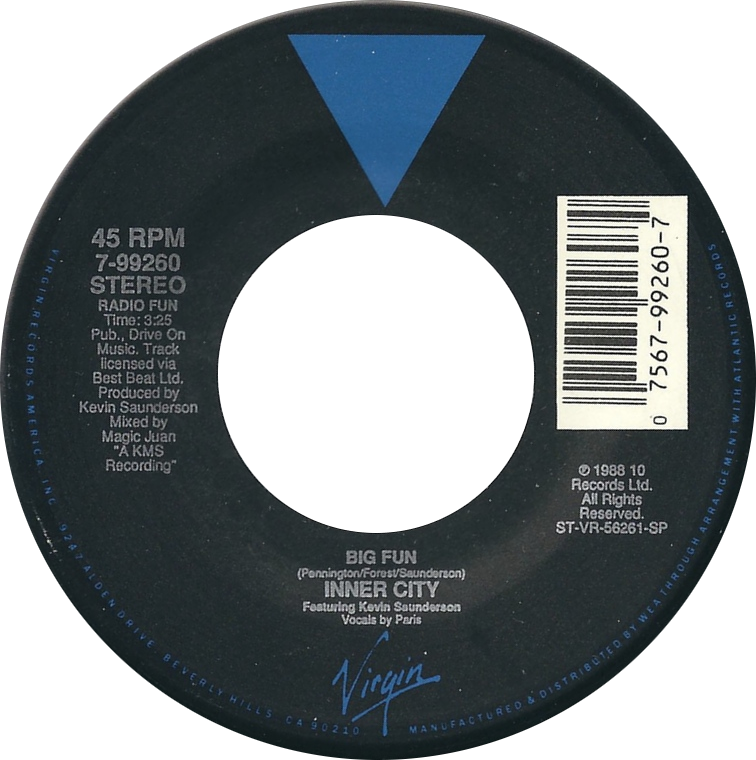
- Radio Fun track of the US 7-inch vinyl single

Single by Inner City featuring Kevin Saunderson

from the album Paradise
- Released: August 22, 1988 (UK)
- Genre: Techno; house
- Length: 3:25
- Label: 10; Virgin
- Songwriters: Kevin Saunderson; Paris Grey; Art Forest; James Pennington
- Producer: Kevin Saunderson

Inner City featuring Kevin Saunderson singles chronology
"Big Fun" (1988)	"Good Life" (1988)

Music video
- "Big Fun" on YouTube

"Big Fun" is a song by American electronic music group Inner City, released in August 1988 by 10 Records and Virgin Records as the first single from their debut album, Paradise (1989). The song is written by group members Kevin Saunderson and Shanna Jackson, formally known as Paris Grey with Art Forest and James Pennington, while Saunderson produced it. It went to number one on the US Billboard Dance Club Play chart for one week and was the first of five releases by the band to reach the top spot. "Big Fun" also peaked at number 50 on the Billboard Hot Black Singles chart. In the United Kingdom, it was a top-10 hit, peaking at number eight on the UK Singles Chart.

== Origins ==
Kevin Saunderson was working on the track in 1987 while attending college. His friend, Terry Baldwin was a Chicago house producer who introduced Paris Grey to Saunderson where he then decided her vocals fit perfectly for the song, successfully blending electric beats and soft pop sounds.

The song emerged during a time of electronic dance music that had not yet separated Chicago house and Detroit techno. The track combines a steady, dance-oriented rhythm often associated with Chicago house as well as including more synthetic textures and production styles that would become the future of techno.

"Big Fun" was an important factor in bringing the electronic genre to an international audience, particularly in the United Kingdom; where listeners distinguished house and techno as two separate genres. It is often viewed as the crossover between house and techno that led to the evolution of techno being defined as its own genre in the late 1980's and 1990's.

== Critical reception ==
AllMusic editor John Bush described "Big Fun" as a "surprise crossover success" in the United Kingdom. Stuart Maconie from NME wrote, "'Big Fun' is a dream of a record. Sparse and alienated but with a heart of pure raspberry ripple. Heard under the right circumstances at around 1am you may well mistake it for the voice of God." Another NME editor, John McCready said, "Kevin's production, the musical input of James Pennington and the smooth vocal stylings of Paris Grey are instinctive."

== Impact and legacy ==
"Big Fun" by Inner City

LA Weekly listed "Big Fun" at number seven in their list of "The 20 Best Dance Music Tracks in History" in 2015, saying, "'Big Fun' was electronic dance music's first pop moment. But beyond its obvious commercial impact, 'Big Fun' was also a milestone in the way it mixed a catchy lead vocal and synth hook with what was essentially a techno backing track. Electronic dance music, for better or worse, would never again be a wholly underground phenomenon." Mixmag ranked it as one of "The 30 Best Vocal House Anthems Ever" in 2018, stating that the song "marries Paris Grey's celebratory vocals with Kevin Saunderson's vibrant production that's packed full of fun flourishes. One of the most surefire party-starters in the crate of any DJ."

British public service broadcaster BBC included the song in their ranking of "30 Tracks That Shaped Dance Music Over the Last 30 Years" in 2019. They wrote, "As one of house music's most infectious crossover hits 'Big Fun' was a hit for young dancers and older ravers alike. It transformed dance music from something found in club basements to a genre that could move an entire nation."

"Our music is for everyone" Saunderson said

== Composition ==
The backing track focuses on Detroit sounds that are grittier and mechanical while also maintaining a steady up beat rhythm inspired by motor and machine work sounds. The vocalist, Grey, incorporates a unique voice that flows smoothly with the harsh beats.

“It wasn’t necessarily the darkest, most underground track that we had ever done, but it wasn’t commercial, either,” Saunderson said. “These lyrics, and her melody, just send it over the top. Her voice was just so unique. It was an instrument itself.”

== Other versions and homages ==
- The song was sampled (and backmasked) in “Just a Techno Groove” by Frank De Wulf under his projects Sounds In Order/Dow Jones in 1989.
- German DJ and remixer Gardeweg used portions of this song, along with Inner City's other two singles, "Good Life" and "Paradise," for his 2003 single "All I Want".
- At the end of 2014, a new version was recorded by D.O.N.S. and Terri B! on Carrillo Records. This version peaked at number one on the US dance chart.
- Rick Astley's 1988 UK top 10 single "Take Me To Your Heart" was heavily inspired by "Big Fun", according to its writer and producer Matt Aitken, who described the track as "a homage", before adding, "You can't copyright a synth pattern."

== Charts ==
=== Weekly charts ===
Chart (1988–1989)	Peak position
Australia (ARIA)	57
Austria (Ö3 Austria Top 40)	15
Canada Dance/Urban (RPM)	1
Finland (Suomen virallinen lista)	17
France (SNEP)	48
Ireland (IRMA)	5
Israel (Israeli Singles Chart)	2
Luxembourg (Radio Luxembourg)	9
Netherlands (Dutch Top 40)	4
Netherlands (Single Top 100)	3
Switzerland (Schweizer Hitparade)	4
UK Singles (OCC)	8
US Dance Club Songs (Billboard)	1
US Dance Singles Sales (Billboard)	1
US Hot R&B/Hip-Hop Songs (Billboard)	50
West Germany (Media Control)	5

=== Year-end charts ===
Chart (1988)	Position
Canada Dance/Urban (RPM)	3
Netherlands (Dutch Top 40)	39
Netherlands (Single Top 100)	35
US 12-inch Singles Sales (Billboard)	38
US Dance Club Play (Billboard)	33

Chart (1989)	Position
West Germany (Media Control)	36

== Certifications ==
Region	Certification	Certified units/sales
United Kingdom (BPI) Sales since 2007	Silver	200,000^{‡}
^{‡} Sales+streaming figures based on certification alone.

== See also ==
- List of number-one dance singles of 1988 (U.S.)
- List of number-one dance singles of 2015 (U.S.)
