= Paradise (Inner City album) =

1989 album by Inner City

Paradise (Big Fun)

Studio album by Inner City
- Released: May 29, 1989
- Recorded: 1988–1989
- Genres: Electronica; house; Detroit techno
- Labels: Virgin; Atlantic; (U.S.): 10; Virgin; EMI; (UK)
- Producers: Kevin Saunderson; Juan Atkins

Inner City chronology
Paradise (Big Fun) (1989)	Fire (1990)

Singles from Paradise
- 1. "Big Fun" Released: 1988; 2. "Good Life" Released: 1988; 3. "Ain't Nobody Better" Released: 1989; 4. "Do You Love What You Feel" Released: 1989

Singles from Big Fun
- 1. "Whatcha Gonna Do with My Lovin'" Released: 1989

Professional ratings
Review scores
Source	Rating
AllMusic	5/5 stars
NME	9/10
Record Mirror	4/5
The Rolling Stone Album Guide	3.5/5 stars
The Village Voice	B−

Paradise (named Big Fun in the US) is the debut album by Detroit-based electronic music duo Inner City, released in 1989. The album was a great success in the UK and in US clubs, and was one of the first techno albums to cross over to the mainstream charts, particularly in Europe. Group member Kevin Saunderson (along with Juan Atkins, who produced one track) is renowned as one of the originators the Detroit techno sound. The vocals on Paradise were performed by the group's other member, Paris Grey.

The album was retitled Big Fun for its US release, and the ballad "Power of Passion" was replaced with "Whatcha Gonna Do with My Lovin'" when that song became popular in the US. The original US pressing, however, contains the former.

A top-three success in the UK, Paradise spun off four top-twenty singles (three of which hit the UK top ten). The first four singles released from the album topped the US Hot Dance Club Play chart. A remix album featuring songs from Paradise was released in the UK later in 1989.

== Track listing ==
All songs produced by Saunderson, except for “And I Do,” produced by Atkins.

=== Paradise/Big Fun ===
1. "Inner City Theme" (K. Saunderson) — 2:50
2. "Paradise" (K. Saunderson, A. Saunderson, P. Grey) — 4:05
3. "Ain't Nobody Better" (K. Saunderson, P. Grey) — 4:01
4. "Power of Passion" (K. Saunderson, P. Grey) — 5:00
5. "Big Fun" (K. Saunderson, P. Grey, J. Pennington, A. Forrest) — 3:25
6. "Do You Love What You Feel" (K. Saunderson, P. Grey) — 5:01
7. "Good Life" (K. Saunderson, P. Grey, R. Holmon) — 4:05
8. "Set Your Body Free" (K. Saunderson, A. Saunderson, C. Damier) — 4:01
9. "And I Do" (J. Atkins, P. Grey) — 4:09
10. "Secrets of the Mind" (K. Saunderson, P. Grey) — 4:55
11. "Whatcha Gonna Do with My Lovin'" (R. Lucas, J. Mtume) — 4:14 (Radio Mix) (Japan only bonus track)
12. "Whatcha Gonna Do With My Lovin'" (R. Lucas, J. Mtume) — 8:28 (Def Mix) (Japan only bonus track)

=== Big Fun (second pressing) ===
1. "Inner City Theme" (K. Saunderson) — 2:50
2. "Paradise" (K. Saunderson, A. Saunderson, P. Grey) — 4:05
3. "Ain't Nobody Better" (K. Saunderson, P. Grey) — 4:01
4. "Whatcha Gonna Do With My Lovin'" (R. Lucas, J. Mtume) — 4:15
5. "Big Fun" (K. Saunderson, P. Grey, J. Pennington, A. Forrest) — 3:25
6. "Do You Love What You Feel" (K. Saunderson, P. Grey) — 5:01
7. "Good Life" (K. Saunderson, P. Grey, R. Holmon) — 4:04
8. "Set Your Body Free" (K. Saunderson, A. Saunderson, C. Damier) — 4:01
9. "And I Do" (J. Atkins, P. Grey) — 4:09
10. "Secrets of the Mind" (K. Saunderson, P. Grey) — 4:55

== Charts ==
Chart (1989)	Peak position
Australian Albums (ARIA)	38
German Albums (Offizielle Top 100)	21
Dutch Albums (Album Top 100)	74
New Zealand Albums (RMNZ)	29
Swedish Albums (Sverigetopplistan)	26
Swiss Albums (Schweizer Hitparade)	18
UK Albums (Official Charts)	3
US Billboard 200	162
US Top R&B/Hip-Hop Albums (Billboard)	58

== Singles ==
- 1988 "Big Fun", #8 UK, #1 U.S. Dance
- 1988 "Good Life", #4 UK, #73 U.S., #1 U.S. Dance
- 1989 "Ain't Nobody Better", #10 UK, #1 U.S. Dance
- 1989 "Do You Love What You Feel", #16 UK, #1 U.S. Dance
- 1989 "Whatcha Gonna Do with My Lovin'", #12 UK, U.S. #76, #8 U.S. Dance
