= Ain't Nobody Better =

Single by Inner City

from the album Paradise
- Released: April 10, 1989 (UK)
- Genre: House
- Length: 4:01
- Label: 10; Virgin
- Songwriters: Kevin Saunderson; Shanna Jackson
- Producer: Kevin Saunderson

Inner City singles chronology
"Good Life" (1988)	"Ain't Nobody Better" (1989)	"Do You Love What You Feel" (1989)

"Ain't Nobody Better" is a song by American group Inner City, released in April 1989 by Virgin and 10 Records as the third single from their debut album, Paradise (1989). It features vocals by Paris Grey and is written by group member Kevin Saunderson with Shanna Jackson and produced by him. The single was the group's third consecutive number-one single on the US Billboard Dance Club Play chart. It also entered the top 10 in the United Kingdom, Finland, Luxembourg and Switzerland.

== Critical reception ==
Pan-European magazine Music & Media complimented the song as "cool, funky and irresistible dance music. Already doing well in the UK and a good bet for a major European hit." Jerry Smith from Music Week wrote, "Techno genius Kevin Saunderson is back to see if he can make it three in a row after his massive success with the stunning dance hits 'Big Fun' and 'Good Life'. With characteristic mesmerising synths and clinical beats beneath Paris Grey's vocal, he can't really fail."

== Charts ==
=== Weekly charts ===
Chart (1989)	Peak position
Australia (ARIA)	67
Belgium (Ultratop 50 Flanders)	25
Denmark (IFPI)	13
Finland (Suomen virallinen lista)	9
Ireland (IRMA)	24
Luxembourg (Radio Luxembourg)	9
Netherlands (Dutch Top 40 Tipparade)	12
Netherlands (Single Top 100)	26
New Zealand (Recorded Music NZ)	40
Switzerland (Schweizer Hitparade)	9
UK Singles (OCC)	10
US 12-inch Singles Sales (Billboard)	5
US Dance Club Play (Billboard)	1
West Germany (GfK)	21

=== Year-end charts ===
Chart (1989)	Position
US 12-inch Singles Sales (Billboard)	50
US Dance Club Play (Billboard)	16
West Germany (Media Control)	99
