= James Pennington =

American DJ

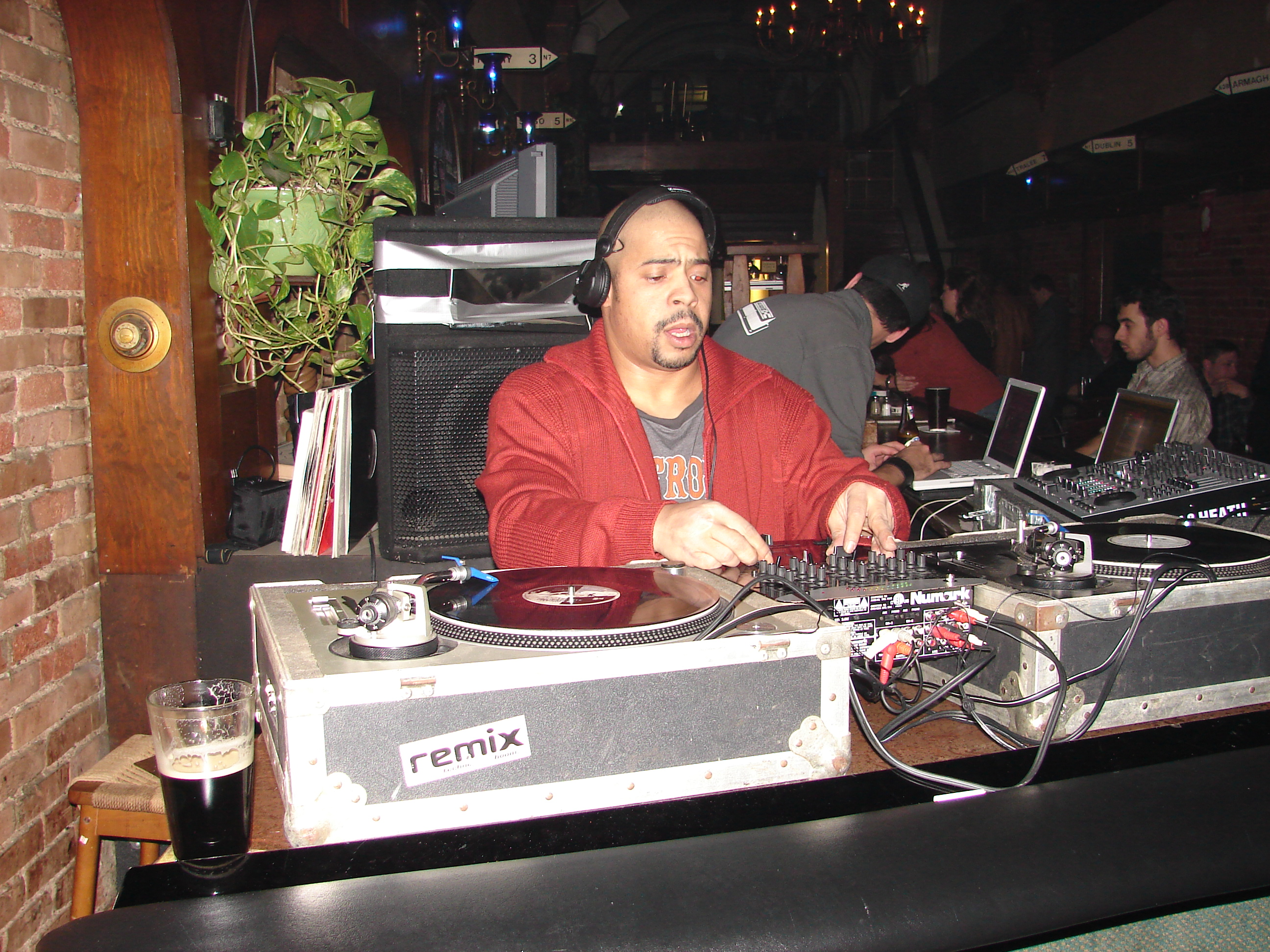
- Pennington in 2006

Background information
- Also known as: Suburban Knight
- Born: 1965 (age 60–61)
- Occupations: DJ, producer
- Labels: Underground Resistance

James Pennington, also known as Suburban Knight, is a DJ and producer with Underground Resistance (UR), an independent record label based in Detroit, United States. Music by Pennington and other UR members was featured in the video game Midnight Club 3: Dub Edition, which is set on the streets of Detroit.

Pennington pioneered the Detroit techno scene since the mid-1980s with moody tracks like "The Art of Stalking" and "The Groove".

With the rise of Detroit's second wave in the early 1990s, Pennington became a mentor for Mike Banks and the Underground Resistance crew. With Underground Resistance, he released the singles "Nocturbulous Behavior" and "Dark Energy". He also featured on the Submerge label compilation Depth Charge, Vol. 3, and produced tracks for Underground Resistance's 1998 full-length Interstellar Fugitive. James' debut album My Sol Dark Direction was released to critical acclaim including both classics and new, unreleased productions.
