= Do You Love What You Feel (Inner City song) =

Single by Inner City

from the album Paradise
- Released: 1989
- Length: 5:01
- Label: 10 Records
- Songwriter(s): Kevin Saunderson; Paris Grey
- Producer(s): Kevin Saunderson

Inner City singles chronology
"Ain't Nobody Better" (1988)	"Do You Love What You Feel" (1989)	"Whatcha Gonna Do with My Lovin'" (1989)

"Do You Love What You Feel" is a song by American electronic music group Inner City, released in 1989 by 10 Records as the fourth single from their debut album, Paradise (1989). The song is written by group members Kevin Saunderson and Paris Grey, while Saunderson produced it. It is not to be confused with the 1979 crossover song of the same name by Rufus and Chaka Khan. The single continued Inner City's success on both the American dance play and UK charts. It made the top twenty on the UK Singles Chart and reached number one on the US Billboard Dance Club Play chart for one week.

== Charts ==
Chart (1989)	Peak position
Australia (ARIA)	76
Ireland (IRMA)	22
Luxembourg (Radio Luxembourg)	13
UK Singles (OCC)	16
US Dance Club Play (Billboard)	1
