= Disco Party =

"Disco Party" is a 1976 disco single by Philadelphia-based disco group, The Trammps. The single was successful on the disco/dance chart reaching the number-one spot for five weeks. "Disco Party" replaced The Trammps' own, "That's Where the Happy People Go", on the dance chart. To date, it has been the only instance where an act replaced itself at number one on this chart.

== Song in popular culture ==
- The song was used as one of the themes for Brazil's version of Wheel of Fortune, Roda a Roda.
