= Good Life (Inner City song) =

1988 single by Inner City

- US and Canadian variant (7-inch edition pictured)

Single by Inner City

from the album Paradise
- Released: November 28, 1988 (UK)
- Genre: House; disco; techno
- Length: 4:03
- Label: 10; Virgin
- Songwriters: Kevin Saunderson; Paris Grey; Ann Saunderson; Roy Holmon
- Producer: Kevin Saunderson

Inner City singles chronology
"Big Fun" (1988)	"Good Life" (1988)	"Ain't Nobody Better" (1989)

Music video
- "Good Life" on YouTube

"Good Life" is a song by American electronic music group Inner City, featuring vocals by Paris Grey, and was released in November 1988 by Virgin and 10 Records as the second single from their debut album, Paradise (1989). It is written by group members Kevin Saunderson and Paris Grey with Ann Saunderson, and produced by Kevin Saunderson. The song became a hit all over the world, reaching number one in Finland and number four on the UK Singles Chart. In the US, it peaked at number one on the Billboard Dance Club Play chart. Its accompanying music video is directed by Neil Thompson and filmed in London.

"Good Life", along with "Big Fun", have been considered prototypes for Belgian act Technotronic's 1989 hit "Pump Up the Jam", and is today widely considered a classic of its genre. In 2025, Billboard magazine ranked "Good Life" among "The 100 Best Dance Songs of All Time".

== Background and release ==
"'Good Life' is a song that's going to touch people forever, it's gonna inspire people, change their mood when they need it, it's definitely going to make them dance—whether the original or a remix. It's that kind of song. It wasn't the intent to make a record to be a hit, it was the intent to make a record that could be played in the clubs that had a melody, which reminded me of when I used to go to hear Larry Levan play Evelyn 'Champagne' King or Chaka Khan. There were some great dance records—disco records—and it was my interpretation at the time."

— Kevin Saunderson talking to DJ Mag about the song.

Electronic music producer Kevin Saunderson met singer Paris Grey through a good friend of his. She then traveled to Detroit to collaborate with him on their debut single, "Big Fun", which was released in 1988. After its success, Virgin asked for a follow-up single and "Good Life" was chosen right away. It was written using basic instruments including a Casio CZ-5000 synth and a Roland TR-909 drum machine. Saunderson made the instrumental part in his own apartment and rented a studio for 24 hours to record it with Grey. He was very happy with the result.

He said in an interview about making the song, "The vocals were 100% Paris on 'Good Life', I just gave her some direction. I said, 'Look, I don't want it to sound like 'Big Fun' but I want it to be in the same family, I want to follow up with a feel that's similar.'" The original version of the track was almost like a radio version, and Juan Atkins, Derrick May and Steve "Silk" Hurley made remixes for the single. It peaked at number four in the UK in January 1989, and was certified silver by the British Phonographic Industry for sales exceeding 200,000 copies. It's their highest-charting single to date and became huge at rave parties and acid house clubs.

In 1999, it was re-recorded and remixed by producer Tommy Onyx and a Spanish language version was also released. It hit number 10 on the UK Singles Chart and was released by [PIAS] Recordings (whereas the original version was issued by Virgin/AVL's 10 Records label). A new music video was also produced to accompany it.

== Critical reception ==
Upon the release, J.D. Considine from The Baltimore Sun felt that songs such as "Good Life" "boast more than enough pop appeal for the average listener". Bill Coleman from Billboard magazine wrote, "Detroit's own Inner City has served up yet another stylized, hook-filled club record with 'Good Life' (Virgin). Producer/chief songwriter/member Kevin Saunderson is becoming the man of the hour—with good reason. Maintaining a feel similar to the act's previous No. 1 smash, 'Big Fun', this new offering manages to blend familiar textures with exciting and refreshing melodies and hooks. Positive lyric treatment and a sensitive delivery by talented, 22-year-old Paris Grey intensify the track by complementing the potent energy the instrumentation creates." Robert Hilburn from Los Angeles Times said, "The emphasis in this hyperactive dance-floor is on inviting sound textures, with all sorts of turntable high jinks adding to the dizzy exuberance." Another Los Angeles Times editor, Chris Willman, stated, "No record this year will have a better groove (or mixture of grooves, really) than this one from Inner City". He remarked that the lyrics "yearn plaintively for something better".

Pan-European magazine Music & Media said, "If you thought 'Big Fun' was good, then check this out. Same basic formula but more melody. Funky and smouldering." Upon the 1998 remix, Music Week wrote, "Guaranteed to cut through the winter cold, this uplifting update of the 1988 house classic adds acoustic guitar flourishes, warm synth washes and Spanish vocals to the original." Alf Billingham from The Observer deemed it "another unequivocal slab of techno hi-tech". Matthew Cole from the Record Mirror Dance Update named it Inner City's "finest moment". Barry Walters for The San Francisco Examiner concluded that as evident in club hits such as "Good Life", "Grey has a voice to be reckoned with. Exuberant, exultant and yet relaxed, it can lovingly rap itself around notes and emotions other singers strain to reach. And it won't let go." Alex Kadis from Smash Hits praised it as a "smashing dance single", stating that "singing girlie person, Paris Grey, has the perfect voice for house-type records."

== Chart performance ==
"Good Life" peaked at number one in Finland, and on both the Canadian RPM Dance chart and the US Billboard Dance Club Play chart. In Europe, it reached number two in West Germany. It spent 17 weeks within the West German Singles Chart, with six weeks inside the top 10. "Good Life" also entered the top 10 Belgium, Ireland, Luxembourg, the Netherlands, Norway, Sweden, Switzerland, and the United Kingdom. In the UK, it peaked at number four during its fifth week on the UK Singles Chart, on January 1, 1989. It spent two weeks at that position and 12 weeks within the chart. "Good Life" was additionally a top-20 hit in Austria and a top 30 hit in Italy. In Oceania, it reached numbers eight and 52 in New Zealand and Australia, respectively. On the US Billboard Hot 100, it peaked at number 73. In West Asia, the song became a top-5 hit in Israel, peaking at number two for three weeks from 15 January 1989.

== Music video ==
The music video for "Good Life", which sees Kevin Saunderson and Paris Grey prancing around in London, was directed by Neil Thompson. Several famous landmarks can be seen in the video, such as Trafalgar Square, St Paul's Cathedral and Piccadilly Circus. Bystanders on the street were stopped and asked to film them. At one point they saw a Rolls-Royce parked on the kerb with a uniformed chauffeur standing by it. The director asked the driver if they could use the car for a minute. The chauffeur drove Grey down the street and then parked it back exactly where it had been, all before the owner returned. "Good Life" was later made available on YouTube in October 2012, and by July 2025, the video had generated more than 11 million views.

== Impact and legacy ==
Alex Henderson from AllMusic complimented the song as a "house gem". Another AllMusic editor, John Bush, praised it as a "uplifting" gem from the "uncommonly moody Detroit club scene of the '80s." American DJ, record producer, remixer and songwriter Armand van Helden named "Good Life" one of his "classic cuts" in 1995, adding, "One of my first vocal house records, before that I was into the Todd Terry, Royal House stuff. When Inner City came out with 'Good Life' it struck me – it's a happy song but very powerful. It moves the dancefloor but it's sassy, it wasn't weak. It had house and techno elements years ahead of its time." Mixmag ranked the song number 20 in its "100 Greatest Dance Singles of All Time" list in 1996, adding, "As the Summer of Love drew to a close, a tune emerged which distilled the spirit of club hedonism, pressed it onto vinyl and slapped it on the decks of every discerning DJ. "Let me take you to a place I know you wanna go", cooed Paris Grey over a chunky effortlessly uplifting backdrop, "it's the good life". And thousands of kids turned on to this bizarre new way of spending your Saturday night knew exactly what she meant. Remove it from its cultural context, play it eight years after it first came out and you're still left with a beautiful, remarkable house record."

Slant Magazine ranked it 55th in its "100 Greatest Dance Songs" list in 2006, writing, "1988's 'Good Life' clanked like techno, pumped like house and featured disco diva vocals from his partner in Inner City, Paris Grey. "Let me take you to a place you know you wanna go/It's a good life", she belts, creating the clearest picture of dance floor halcyon since Chic sang about 54 and its roller skates, roller skates." In Time Out's 2015 list of "The 20 Best House Tracks Ever", "Good Life" was included at #11, adding, "One of Detroit techno don Kevin Saunderson's housier, poppier moments - under his Inner City project with singer Paris Grey - also became his most well-known. With its unashamedly upbeat vocals and colourful '80s synths all over the place, 'Good Life' showed that dance music wasn't all about heads-down raving in a dark basement club - it could also be (whisper it) happy, for no damn reason at all." In a 2017 retrospective review, Pop Rescue stated that the song is "absolutely flawless in production, strength of vocals and beats", noting that "those up-beat lyrics, over a catchy synth and bassline, mixed with Paris Grey's fantastically dreamy vocals really does make this track feel like a slice of sunshine in the winter". Mixmag included it in their ranking of "The Best 20 House Classics From Before 1990" in October 2017. In March 2025, Billboard magazine ranked "Good Life" number 56 in their list of "The 100 Best Dance Songs of All Time", writing, "An equal blend of house and techno, it demonstrates why both genres endure as two of America's greatest artforms."

=== Accolades ===
Year	Publisher	Country	Accolade	Rank
1996	Mixmag	United Kingdom	"The 100 Best Dance Singles of All Time"	20
2003	Blender	United States	"The 1001 Greatest Songs to Download Right Now!"	*
2006	Slant Magazine	United States	"100 Greatest Dance Songs"	55
2008	Neon	Germany	"Die 222 besten Songs aller Zeiten"	*
2009	The Guardian	United Kingdom	"1000 Songs Everyone Must Hear"	*
2015	Pitchfork	United States	"The 200 Best Songs of the 1980s"	165
2015	Robert Dimery	United States	"1,001 Songs You Must Hear Before You Die, and 10,001 You Must Download (2015 Update)"	*
2015	Time Out	United Kingdom	"The 20 Best House Tracks Ever"	11
2017	Mixmag	United Kingdom	"The Best 20 House Classics from Before 1990"	*
2020	Slant Magazine	United States	"The 100 Best Dance Songs of All Time"	92
2020	NME	United Kingdom	"The 20 Best House Music Songs... Ever!"	*
2020	Tomorrowland	Belgium	"Ibiza Top 500"	68
2022	Rolling Stone	United States	"200 Greatest Dance Songs of All Time"	44
2022	Time Out	United Kingdom	"20 Best House Tracks Ever"	11
2024	Classic Pop	United Kingdom	"Top 20 80s House Hits"	8
2025	Billboard	United States	"The 100 Best Dance Songs of All Time"	56
2025	Billboard	United States	"The 50 Best House Songs of All Time"	7

(*) indicates the list is unordered.

== Track listings ==
- 12-inch single, US (1988)
1. "Good Life" (Mayday Mix) – 6:12
2. "Good Life" (Steve "Silk" Hurley Mix) – 7:11
3. "Good Life" (Radio Mix) – 3:59
4. "Good Life" (Magic Juan Mix) – 8:28
5. "Good Life" (Mike "Hitman" Wilson Mix) – 7:21
6. "Big Fun" (Les Adams Remix) – 6:47
- 7-inch single, Italy (1988)
1. "Good Life" (Master Reese Edit) – 3:59
2. "Good Life" (Instrumental) – 5:12
3. "Good Life" (Original 12-inch Mix) – 7:13
- 12-inch single, UK (1988)
1. "Good Life" (Magic Juan's Mix) – 8:18
2. "Good Life" (Mayday Club Mix) – 6:12
3. "Big Fun" (L.A. Big Big Fun Remix) – 5:12
- CD single, UK and Europe (1989)
1. "Good Life" (Master Reese Edit 7-inch) – 4:05
2. "Good Life" (Magic Juan's Mix 12-inch) – 8:29
3. "Big Fun" (L.A. Big Big Fun Remix) – 5:15

== Charts ==
=== Weekly charts ===
Chart (1989)	Peak position
Australia (ARIA)	52
Austria (Ö3 Austria Top 40)	12
Belgium (Ultratop 50 Flanders)	7
Canada Dance/Urban (RPM)	1
Europe (Eurochart Hot 100)	4
Finland (Suomen virallinen lista)	1
France (IFOP)	77
Ireland (IRMA)	6
Israel (Israeli Singles Chart)	2
Italy (Musica e dischi)	22
Italy Airplay (Music & Media)	13
Luxembourg (Radio Luxembourg)	4
Netherlands (Dutch Top 40)	4
Netherlands (Single Top 100)	6
New Zealand (RIANZ)	8
Norway (VG-lista)	10
Quebec (ADISQ)	17
Sweden (Topplistan)	9
Switzerland (Schweizer Hitparade)	5
UK Singles (OCC)	4
US Billboard Hot 100	73
US 12-inch Singles Sales (Billboard)	2
US Dance Club Play (Billboard)	1
West Germany (Media Control)	2

Chart (1993)	Peak position
UK Club Chart (Music Week)	1

=== 1998 Tommy Onyx version ===
Chart (1998–1999)	Peak position
Belgium Dance (Ultratop)	20
Europe (Eurochart Hot 100)	41
Netherlands (Single Top 100)	73
New Zealand (RIANZ)	48
Scotland (OCC)	10
UK Singles (OCC)	10
UK Indie (Official Charts)	1
UK Dance (Official Charts)	2

=== Year-end charts ===
Chart (1988)	Position
UK Singles (OCC)	72

Chart (1989)	Position
Belgium (Ultratop)	77
Canada Dance/Urban (RPM)	18
Europe (Eurochart Hot 100)	65
Netherlands (Dutch Top 40)	69
Netherlands (Single Top 100)	98
New Zealand (RIANZ)	41
US 12-inch Singles Sales (Billboard)	13
US Hot Dance Club Play (Billboard)	34
West Germany (Media Control)	38

Chart (1993)	Position
UK Club Chart (Music Week)	13

== Certifications ==
Region	Certification	Certified units/sales
United Kingdom (BPI)	Platinum	600,000^{‡}
^{‡} Sales+streaming figures based on certification alone.

== Sampling ==
- In 1984 samples Volume of the Good Life GMBH a Frankfurt Germany sound recording Pop dance single classic produced by D.Staggs Sr
- In 1989 it was sampled in "(Still Life) Keeps Moving" by Nexus 21, and in "Techno Time" by The Maxx.
- In 1990 "A Place Called Bliss" by Cyclone (2) used a sample.
- In 1992 it got sampled by Yuzo Koshiro in the song "Go Straight", and by Jungle House Crew in "Let Me Take You".
- In 1996 it was sampled in "Chord Memory" by Ian Pooley.
- In 2005 "Rock On" by Jackson and His Computer Band used a sample of "Good Life".
- In 2008 it got sampled by Hercules and Love Affair in the song "You Belong", and in "Be Free" by Promise Land.
- In 2009, Bajan singer Rihanna used a sample in the song "Bubble Pop", and it was also used in "Celebration" by Tony Lionni and by Kim Fai in the song "Good Life".
- In 2013 it was sampled in "Wanna Go" by Maxsta feat. Little Nikki, and "Cut Me Up" by Stanton Warriors and Them & Us.
- In 2014 it got sampled in "Let Me" by René Amesz.
- In 2015 "Techno Disco" by Kerrier District and "Wanna Go" by Dos Padres used a sample.
- In 2021 Ferry Corsten sampled parts of the vocals for his song "Lemme Take You".
- In 2026, American singers and songwriters Madonna and Sabrina Carpenter sampled the track for the former's song "Bring Your Love", from her upcoming fifteenth studio album Confessions II.

== In popular culture ==
- In November 1996, the song was featured prominently in the opening scene of "Smack is Back", a third-season episode of the FOX police drama television series New York Undercover.
- It was featured in the opening credits of House of Style when it premiered on MTV in January 1989.
- It was also featured in the films Slaves of New York (1989), Side Out (1990) and B*A*P*S (1997).
- It was programmed as a chiptune for the Game Boy Advance e-reader.
- German DJ/remixer Gardeweg used portions of this song, along with Inner City's other two singles, "Big Fun" and "Paradise", for his 2003 single "All I Want"
- In 2005 the song was used in the South African movie Crazy Monkey presents Straight Outta Benoni. Both the original Inner City version and a cover by South African band The Finkelsteins were used in the soundtrack.
- Hercules and Love Affair sampled the synth on the song You Belong from their 2008 self-titled album.
- It was featured in the closing credits of the 2012 Tour de France coverage on Eurosport.
- Gossip sampled the synth on the song "Get Lost" from their 2012 album A Joyful Noise.
- Britney Spears sampled many elements of the song on the track "Up n' Down" from her 2011 album Femme Fatale.
- M-22 samples the song in their 2019 single "White Lies"
