= Inner City (band) =

American techno band

- Origin: Detroit, Michigan, United States
- Genres: House; Detroit techno; electronic
- Years active: 1987–present
- Labels: Virgin/Atlantic; Virgin/EMI; Columbia/SME; Ten; KMS
- Members: Kevin Saunderson; Ann Saunderson; Dantiez Saunderson; Steffanie Christi'an
- Past members: Paris Grey

Inner City is an American electronic dance music band formed in 1987 in Detroit, Michigan. The group originally consisted of record producer and composer Kevin Saunderson (born September 5, 1964 in New York), and vocalist Paris Grey (born November 5, 1965 in Glencoe, near Chicago, Illinois). Saunderson, along with Juan Atkins and Derrick May, is one of the Belleville Three, high school friends who later pioneered the Detroit techno, the first techno musical scene. In February 2018, Billboard magazine ranked them as the 69th most successful dance music artists of all-time.

== Musical career ==
Inner City topped the US Billboard dance chart five times, and had nine top 40 hits on the UK Singles Chart. The group's early dancefloor-pop music crossover tracks were "Big Fun" (UK No. 8, US Dance No. 1) and "Good Life" (UK No. 4, US Dance No. 1). Other hits include "Ain't Nobody Better" (UK No. 10, US Dance No. 1) "Do You Love What You Feel" (UK No. 16, US Dance No. 1) and "Whatcha Gonna Do with My Lovin'" (UK No. 12, US Dance No. 8). The group recorded three albums for Virgin/EMI Records and two singles for Columbia/SME Records.

In the early 1990s, Tommy Onyx was brought on to be the band leader for Inner City live shows. Onyx co wrote the hits “Hallelujah”, “Fire” & “Bad Girl” and produced the Spanish language version of Good Life, “Buena Vida”.

In 2017, a new incarnation of the group was formed with Kevin Saunderson's youngest son Dantiez joining as a permanent fixture. Dantiez and Kevin’s first single as Inner City, “Good Luck”, was released April 14, 2017 on KMS. “Good Luck” features vocals from LaRae Starr and includes remixes from DEAS, Sure Is Pure and Chuck Daniels. In 2018, Steffanie Christi’an was added as vocalist.

In 2020, the Saundersons (Kevin and his son Dantiez) released a new Inner City album with Christi'an as the main vocalist. Called We All Move Together, the title track which featured a spoken word performance from actor Idris Elba. Elba also featured on the single "No More Looking Back", which was the first Inner City project to be released by Defected Records, a British independent record label specialising in house music.

== Discography ==
=== Albums ===
Year	Album	Peak chart positions								Certifications (sales thresholds)
Year	Album	UK	US	AUS	GER	NED	NZ	SUI	CAD	Certifications (sales thresholds)
1989	Paradise / Big Fun ^{[A]}	3	162	38	21	74	29	18	55	BPI: Platinum
1990	Paradise Remixed	17	—	119	—	—	—	—	—	
1990	Fire	—	—	166	—	—	—	—	—	
1992	Praise	52	—	135	—	—	—	—	—	
1993	Testament ’93	33	—	166	—	—	—	—	—	
2003	Good Life—the Best of Inner City	—	—	—	—	—	—	—	—	
2020	We All Move Together	—	—	—	—	—	—	—	—	
"—" denotes releases that were not released in that country or did not chart.

- ^{A} Album was released as Big Fun in North America.

=== Singles ===
Year	Single	Peak chart positions										Certifications (sales thresholds)	Album
Year	Single	UK	US	US Dance	AUS	AUT	GER	IRE	NED	NZ	SUI	Certifications (sales thresholds)	Album
1988	"Big Fun"	8	—	1	57	15	5	5	3	—	4	BPI: Silver	Paradise
1988	"Good Life"	4	73	1	52	12	2	6	6	8	5	BPI: Platinum	Paradise
1989	"Ain't Nobody Better"	10	—	1	67	—	21	24	26	40	9		Paradise
1989	"Do You Love What You Feel"	16	—	1	76	—	—	22	—	—	—		Paradise
1989	"Whatcha Gonna Do with My Lovin'"	12	76	8	86	—	—	24	12	—	—		Big Fun
1990	"That Man (He's All Mine)"	42	—	15	143	—	—	—	—	—	—		Fire
1991	"Till We Meet Again"	47	—	—	—	—	—	—	—	—	—		Fire
1991	"Let It Reign"	51	—	—	—	—	—	—	40	—	—		Praise
1992	"Hallelujah '92"	22	—	—	—	—	—	—	—	—	—		Praise
1992	"Pennies from Heaven"	24	—	1	122	—	—	—	51	—	—		Praise
1992	"Praise"	59	—	—	—	—	—	—	—	—	—		Praise
1992	"Follow Your Heart"	—	—	2	—	—	—	—	—	—	—		Praise
1993	"Till We Meet Again" (remix)	55	—	—	—	—	—	—	—	—	—		Non-album singles
1993	"Back Together Again"	49	—	—	—	—	—	—	—	—	—		Non-album singles
1994	"Do Ya"	44	—	5	—	—	—	—	—	—	—		Non-album singles
1994	"Share My Life"	62	—	24	—	—	—	—	—	—	—		Non-album singles
1995	"Ahnonghay"	97	—	—	—	—	—	—	—	—	—		Non-album singles
1996	"Your Love"	28	—	—	—	—	—	—	—	—	—		Non-album singles
1996	"Do Me Right"	47	—	—	—	—	—	—	—	—	—		Non-album singles
1999	"Good Life (Buena Vida)" (PIAS re-recording)	10	—	—	—	—	—	—	73	48	—		Non-album singles
2001	"Good Love"	81	—	—	—	—	—	—	—	—	—		Non-album singles
2001	"Pump It Up Dub" (with E-Dancer)	—	—	—	—	—	—	—	—	—	—		Non-album singles
2003	"Big Fun" (remix)	86	—	—	—	—	—	—	—	—	—		Non-album singles
2004	"Say Something"	—	—	—	—	—	—	—	—	—	—		Non-album singles
2011	"Future" (as Kevin Saunderson featuring Inner City)	—	—	—	—	—	—	—	—	—	—		Non-album singles
2014	"Bad Girl" (as Kevin Saunderson featuring Inner City)	—	—	—	—	—	—	—	—	—	—		Non-album singles
2017	"Good Luck"	—	—	—	—	—	—	—	—	—	—		Non-album singles
2019	"It Could Be" (with Armin van Buuren)	—	—	—	—	—	—	—	—	—	—		Balance
"—" denotes releases that were not released in that country or did not chart.

== Articles, interviews and reviews ==
- "Kevin Saunderson: “Black people don’t even know that techno came from Black artists”Jaguar talks to Kevin Saunderson and Idris Elba about their Inner City collaboration, the roots of techno and the future of dance music" jaguea, Mix, 22 October 2020
- "How we made Good Life: Paris Grey and Kevin Saunderson on Inner City's house classic" interview by Interviews by Dave Simpson, The Guardian, Tue 6 Aug 2019

== See also ==
- List of number-one dance hits (United States)
- List of artists who reached number one on the US Dance chart
