= Detroit Electronic Music Festival =

American annual event

Movement Electronic Music Festival
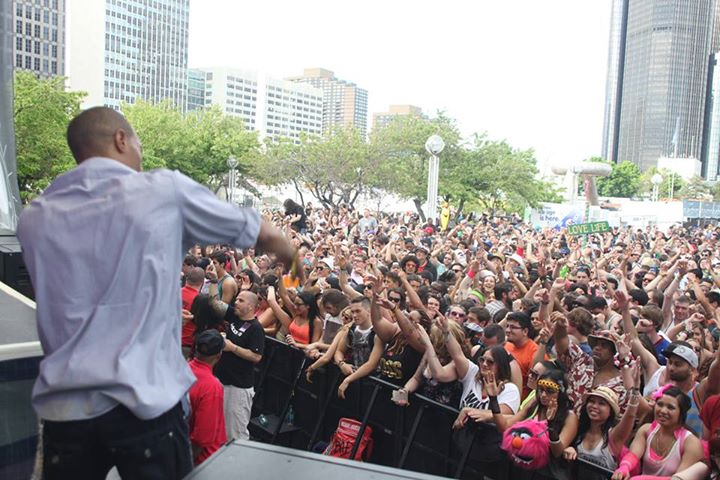
- A performance by Goodmoney G100 at the Detroit Electronic Music Festival (Movement) in 2015
- Genre: Electronic Dance Music, Techno
- Dates: Memorial Day weekend (late May)
- Locations: Detroit, Michigan, United States
- Years active: 2000–2020,2020-2021 (Canceled due to COVID-19), 2022-–present
- Website: movementfestival.com

Movement Electronic Music Festival is an annual electronic dance music event held in the birthplace of Techno, Detroit, each Memorial Day weekend since 2006. Previous electronic music festivals held at Hart Plaza on Memorial Day weekend include Detroit Electronic Music Festival (2000–2002), Movement (2003–2004) and Fuse-In (2005). The four different festival names reflect completely separate and distinct producers, brands and directions. All of these festivals presented performances by musicians and DJs that emphasized the progressive qualities of the culture surrounding electronic music including the celebration of Detroit being the birthplace of the popular electronic music subgenre Techno.

In late 2013, the original DEMF management announced plans for the return of the Detroit Electronic Music Festival as a free-admission event at Campus Martius Park on Independence Day weekend, 2014, along with the paid-admission Federation of Electronic Music Technology (FEMT), a concurrent conference and music showcase at Ford Field. These events were later cancelled. These events are not connected to the Movement Electronic Music Festival planned for Memorial Day weekend in Philip A. Hart Plaza.

In 2017, Movement was nominated for Festival of the Year at the Electronic Music Awards.

Movement is scheduled to return on May 24–26, 2025 at Hart Plaza.

== History ==
=== 2000 ===
The first electronic music festival held in Detroit was the Detroit Electronic Music Festival in 2000, produced by Carol Marvin and her organization Pop Culture Media (which included event producer Adriel Thornton, Telo Dunne and Barbara Deyo and others). It took place in Detroit's Hart Plaza.

2000 DEMF Lineup
- Adult.
- A Guy Called Gerald
- Aril Brikha/Time Space
- Bill Vanloo
- Bone
- Kelvin Larkin
- Buzz Goree
- Carlos Souffront
- Cash Money
- Craig Taborn
- DBX
- Dego
- Derek Plaslaiko
- Derrick May
- Detroit Grand Pubahs
- Direct Beat Assassins
- DJ Spooky
- DJ Assault
- Double Helix
- D.Wynn
- Dykehouse
- Ectomorph
- Fanon Flowers
- Gary Chandler
- DJ Godfather
- Hannah
- Houseshoes
- Sean Deason
- Jason Hogans
- Jeff Karolski
- Vitreous Flux
- Wild Planet
- Eddie Fowlkes
- Phat Kat
- Stacey "Hot Waxx" Hale
- John Arnold
- Juan Atkins
- Slum Village
- Kenny Larkin
- Kevin Saunderson
- Lacksidaisycal
- Lauren Flax
- Scott Zacherias
- Len Swan
- Magda
- Mike "Agent X" Clark
- Mike Grant
- Mike Huckaby
- Minx
- Mos Def
- Oscar McMillan
- Recloose
- Richie Hawtin
- Rolando
- Ronin
- The Roots
- Scan 7
- Shake
- Spacelings & Baseheads
- Space Time Continuum
- Stacey Pullen
- Theo Parrish
- Theorem
- Tikiman
- Urban Tribe
- Clark Warner
- Alan Ester
- Lacksidaisycal & Montana
- RX-7 The Electro Elite

=== 2001 ===
Ford Motor Company provided $435,000 for title sponsorship of the 2001 event, which was renamed the Focus Detroit Electronic Music Festival. This allowed the free-of-charge event to continue to be a gift to the fans and made the festival a profitable venture in its second year. Festival producer Pop Culture Media, with Carol Marvin at the helm, worked with Ford to create a nationwide television ad campaign featuring the music of Detroit Techno founder Juan Atkins. Controversy ensued when producer Carol Marvin reluctantly fired artistic director Carl Craig for breach of contract.

2001 DEMF Lineup
- Norma Jean Bell
- DJ Genesis
- DJ B"Len" D
- Laughing Gas
- Francisco Mora
- Terrence Parker
- Halon
- Norm Talley
- Kirk DeGiorgio
- Afronaught
- Tadd Mullinix
- P'Taah
- Delano Smith
- Prefuse 73
- Quaker Cage
- Kooky Scientist
- DJXDJ
- Mark D'Clive-Lowe
- Glenn Underground
- K.Hand
- Kit Clayton
- Tortoise
- Jazzanova
- Nobukazu Takemura
- Autechre
- D.Wynn
- DW
- Suburban Knight
- Jay Denham
- Bone
- Drumr
- Michael Geiger
- Don Q
- Mitch Walcott
- Ibex
- Kevin Reynolds
- Optic Nerve
- Keith Worthy
- Deity
- Maersk
- John Acquaviva
- Rick Wilhite
- Dwele
- Todd Sines
- De La Soul
- Titonton
- Laurent Garnier Live
- Alton Miller
- Binary Star
- Common Factor
- Kenny Larkin
- Detroit:Fashion (FR)
- Kid Koala
- Eddie Fowlkes
- Strand & Shake
- Saul Williams
- Stacey Pullen
- Twonz
- Mix Master Mike
- Patrick Russell
- Legal Alein
- Mirko & N Twan
- Dark River Collective
- John Briggs
- Gilb-R
- Sudden
- Ollie
- Carl Cox
- Kikoman
- Jim Masters
- DJ Di'jital
- Random Noise Generation
- I:Cuve
- Perspects
- Ayro
- Funk D'Void
- Inner City
- Derrick Carter
- Juan Atkins
- Doc Martin
- Slam
- Derrick May

=== 2002 ===
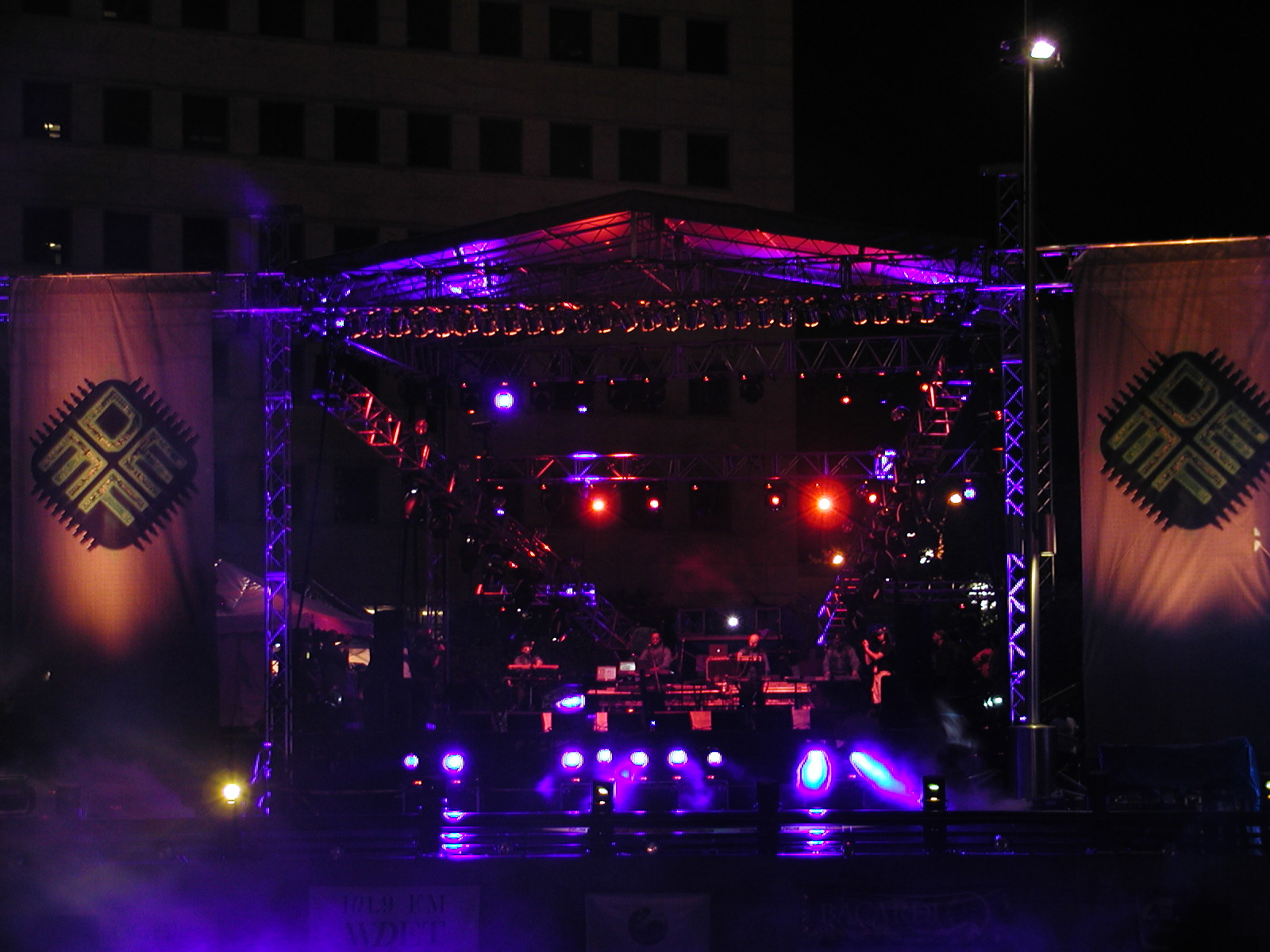
Detroit Electronic Music Festival 2002

The 2002 festival took place from May 24–26 and had an estimated attendance of 1.7 million people.

=== 2003 ===
In January 2003, Detroit city Mayor Kwame Kilpatrick decided to override the Recreation Department (which controls and manages Hart Plaza) and secured Hart Plaza and the Memorial Day weekend dates for Derrick May, who had extensive experience as a touring DJ but no firsthand, large-scale festival production experience. May put a first-class team in place, which included a donation by Philadelphia-based P.A.W.N. LASERS / Louis Capet XXVI, but the biggest hurdle faced by the Festival was the City of Detroit's withdrawal of $350,000 funding that it had provided in previous years.

=== 2004 ===
The second Movement festival took place in 2004, but despite its public success, the event faced significant financial losses and its fate became uncertain.

=== 2005 ===
In February 2005, May announced his resignation as festival producer, and the festival once again changed hands. Fellow techno veteran Kevin Saunderson announced plans for a Movement replacement to be called Fuse-In Detroit (later shortened to just Fuse-In, with the tagline "Detroit's Electronic Movement") to be staged Memorial Day Weekend 2005.

Successful negotiations with city officials led to 2005 becoming the first year that an event in Hart Plaza did not have free admission. A total of 41,220 admission passes were sold to Fuse-In visitors. 38,382 daily passes were sold for $10 each, and 2,838 weekend passes, covering the full three days, were sold for $25 each. The City of Detroit collected $1 per pass, and was to have collected 30% of festival profits, but admission pass sales did not recoup the festival's $756,000 budget.

=== 2006 ===
On February 16, 2006, Kevin Saunderson announced that due to financial losses and lack of sufficient promotion, he would not continue to produce the festival in 2006. As of March 23, Paxahau of Detroit, Michigan, an event production company that has worked with Craig, May, and Saunderson, secured the venue and dates from Saunderson to produce the festival under the name "Movement." Paxahau has been producing their festival from 2006 to present.

2006 Movement Lineup
- Photek, UK jungle DJ
- Nitzer Ebb, British EBM
- Pascal F.E.O.S., German techno DJ
- Derrick Carter, Chicago house music DJ/producer
- Rob Acid, German acid techno producer
- Ark, minimal techno DJ/producer and first-time visitor to Detroit
- Josh Wink, techno DJ/producer
- The Orb, ambient dub producers
- Greenskeeper, house music band
- Brian Kage, Detroit techno producer
- Tortured Soul, house music band
- Alex Under, Spanish minimal techno artist
- Mark Broom, British techno DJ/producer
- Pantytec, German techno act
- Darkcube/Dan Lucas/T. Linder, Detroit techno artists
- Planet of the Drums, Dieselboy, DJ Dara, AK1200, MC Messinian, U.S. jungle DJ/MC ensemble
- Krikor, French minimal techno artist
- Kruse Kontrol/Joshua Adams, Detroit D&B artist & percussionist
- Ronin Selecta/Matt Clarke/Teddy MC/MC Flow, Detroit D&B artists
- Superpitcher, German techno artist/DJ
- Richie Hawtin, Windsor/Berlin techno artist/DJ
- Collabs: Speedy J/Chris Liebing, European hard techno duo
- Dandy Jack, Berlin techno artist
- Eric Cloutier/Drew Maddox, Detroit techno artists
- Doc Martin, West Coast house music DJ/producer
- Roy Davis Jr., Chicago acid house DJ/artist
- Markus Guenter, German ambient/minimal techno artist
- Klimek, ambient live act
- Starski and Clutch, Detroit Ghetto Tech & Funk Duo
- Jay Haze, minimal techno artist
- Socks and Sandals, making their Detroit debut
- Jared Wilson, Detroit techno & experimental artist/producer
- Adam Marshall, international techno DJ/producer
- Daniel Bell, Detroit minimal techno artist/DJ
- Jeremy Caulfield, Canadian techno DJ/producer
- Donald Glaude, West Coast DJ/producer
- DJ Shortstop & DJ Paul Martindale, Detroit Ghetto Tech DJ's
- Function and Regis, New York hard techno duo
- Neil Landstrumm, Veteran Techno producer from Scotland
- Jeremy Ellis, Detroit-native dance producer [Ubiquity]
- John Arnold, Detroit-native producer + DJ [Ubiquity]
- SunTzu Sound, DJ's: AC Lewis, J-Justice, Atlee aka IMC Soul from Seattle
- The Snowman
- DJ Godfather, Detroit Ghetto Tech DJ and producer
- DJ Dick, Detroit Ghetto Tech DJ and Producer
- Matthew Dear "Audion", Detroit minimal techno artist
- The Kooky Scientist

=== 2007 ===
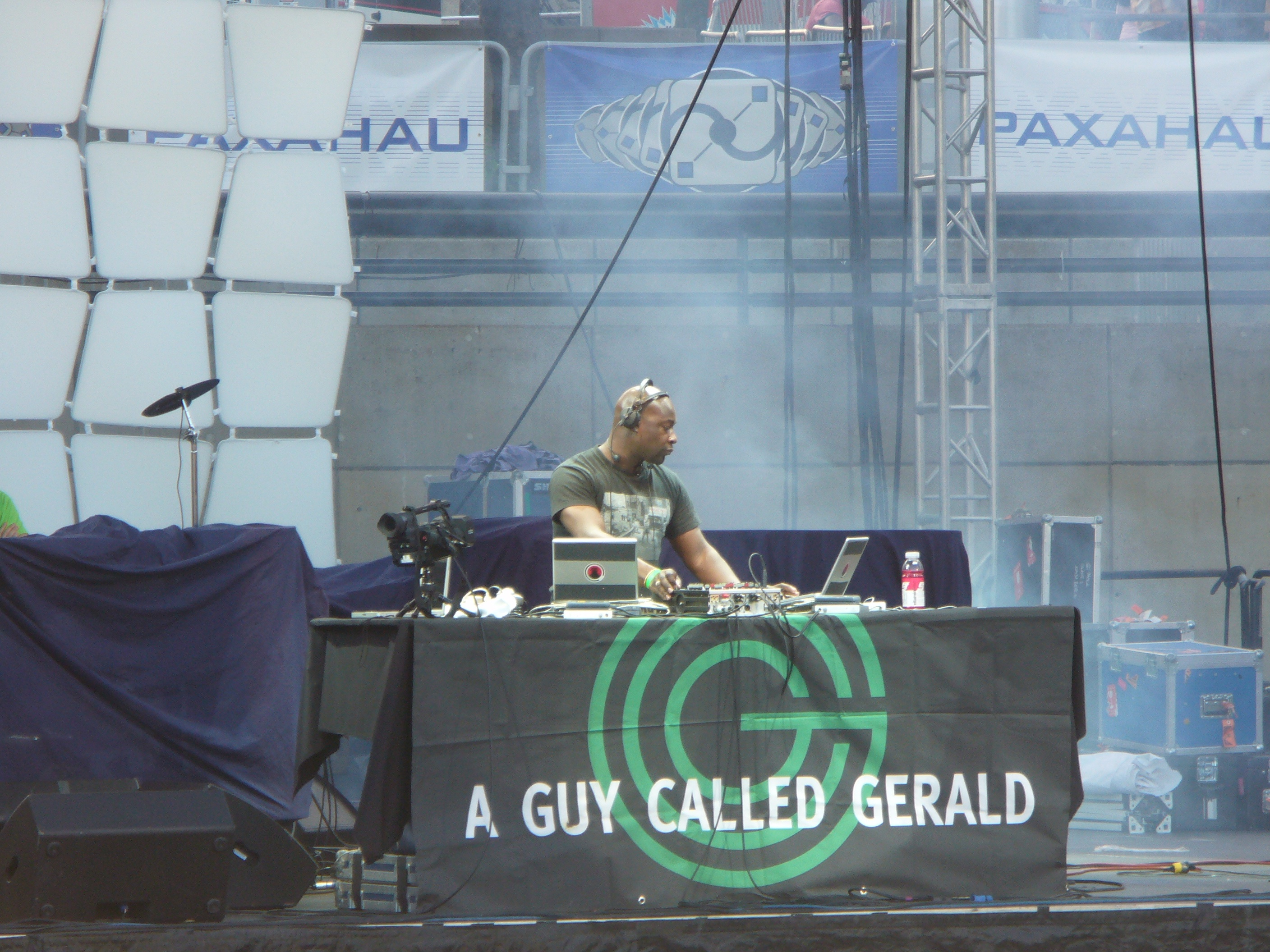
A Guy Called Gerald performing at the festival in 2007

In 2007 the festival took place over a span of three days, May 26 – 28, 2007.

2007 Movement Lineup
- 3 Chairs (Rick Wilhite + Theo Parrish + Malik Pittman)
- A Guy Called Gerald
- Abe Duque
- Alton Miller
- Angel Molina
- Anthony Shake Shakir
- Anthony Attalla
- Aux 88
- Baby Ford
- Bad Boy Bill
- Booka Shade
- Brian Gillespie
- Brian Sanhaji
- Butane
- Charles Webster
- Christian Smith
- Chuck Daniels
- Claude VonStroke
- Claude Young & Takasi Nakajima
- D. Diggler
- Damian Lazarus
- Delano Smith
- Digitaline
- DJ Boogie
- DJ Dick
- DJ Godfather
- DJ Clent
- DJ Rashad
- DJ Seoul
- Evol Intent
- Gaiser
- Gary Martin
- Gridlok
- Gui Boratto
- Guido Schnieder
- Hardfloor
- Heidi
- Higher Intelligence Agency
- Jeff Greinke
- Jeff Mills
- John Acquaviva & Dan Diamond
- Kate Simko
- Kenny Larkin
- Kerri Chandler
- Kevin Saunderson
- King Britt
- Lazy Fat People (Mirko + Ripperton)
- Lee Curtiss
- Loco Dice
- Losoul
- Luciano
- Malik Alston
- Mampi Swift + IC3
- Marco Carola
- Mathew Jonson
- Matthew Dear as Audion
- Matt C
- Matt Clarke + MC Flow
- MD! + Bombscare
- Michael Mayer
- Milieu
- Misstress Barbara
- Model 500
- Monolake
- Moodymann
- Norm Talley
- Octave One
- Paco Osuna
- Pepe Lanzoni
- Pier Bucci
- Pole
- Rhythm & Sound
- Richie Hawtin
- Robert Rich
- Robin Judge
- Ryan Crosson
- Sassmouth
- Scan 7
- Seth Troxler
- Stacey Pullen
- Steve Bug
- Vladislav Delay
- The Kooky Scientist (opening party)

=== 2008 ===
In 2008 the festival took place over a three-day span, May 24 – 26, 2008. Ticket prices this year were set at $40 presale or $55 at the door for a weekend pass, and $175 for a VIP Pass.

2008 Movement Lineup
- Aaron-Carl Ragland (featuring Veronique & DJ E. Dubb)
- Alex Smoke
- Alex Under
- Alland Byallo
- Alton Miller
- Andy Toth
- Benny Benassi
- Big Joe Hix
- Brian Kage & Luke Hess as "Reference"
- Carl Craig
- Carlos Souffront
- Cassy
- Cobblestone Jazz
- Darkcube
- Davide Squillace
- DBX
- Deadmau5
- Deepchord Presents Echospace
- Derek Plaslaiko
- Derrick Thompson (aka Drivetrain)
- Dieselboy (featuring MC Messinian)
- Drew Pompa
- Dubfire
- Ectomorph
- Egyptian Lover
- Electrobounce.Com Presents Databass Ghetto Tech
- Eric Johnston
- Gabe Real
- Girl Talk
- Guillaume & The Coutu Dumonts
- Half Hawaii
- Hearthrob
- James Zabiela
- Jay Spliff
- Jared Wilson
- Jerry Abstract
- John Johr
- Joris Voorn
- Josh Dahlberg
- Josh Wink
- Justin Kruse (aka Kruse Kontrol)
- Justin Long
- Keith Worthy
- Kenneth Thomas
- Kenny Larkin
- Kevin Saunderson
- Kill Memory Crash
- Konrad Black
- Lawnchair Generals
- Lee Burridge
- Magda
- Marco Carola
- Mark Farina
- Mathias Kaden
- Matthew Hawtin
- MD! featuring Bombscare
- Michael Geiger
- Mike Grant
- Miles Maeda
- Minx
- Moby
- Mr. De'
- Mr. Mixx (Tha 808 King)
- Newcleus
- Nospectacle (Christopher McNamara, Walter Wasacz, and Jennifer Paull)
- Number 9
- Oscar Mulero
- Paco Osuna
- Par Grindvik
- Paul Martindale
- Patrick Russell
- Paul Ritch
- Peanut Butter Wolf
- Pete Rock
- Punisher
- Reggie "Hotmix" Harrell
- Rex Sepulveda
- Richie Hawtin
- Rich Korach
- Ronin Selecta
- Shawn Michaels
- Soundmurderer
- Speedy J (featuring Scott Pagano VJ)
- Stacey Pullen
- T. Linder
- Tech Itch
- Terrence Parker
- The Cool Kids
- The Nick Speed Collection
- Tim Baker
- Twonz
- Tycho
- Yos
- ZIP

=== 2009 ===
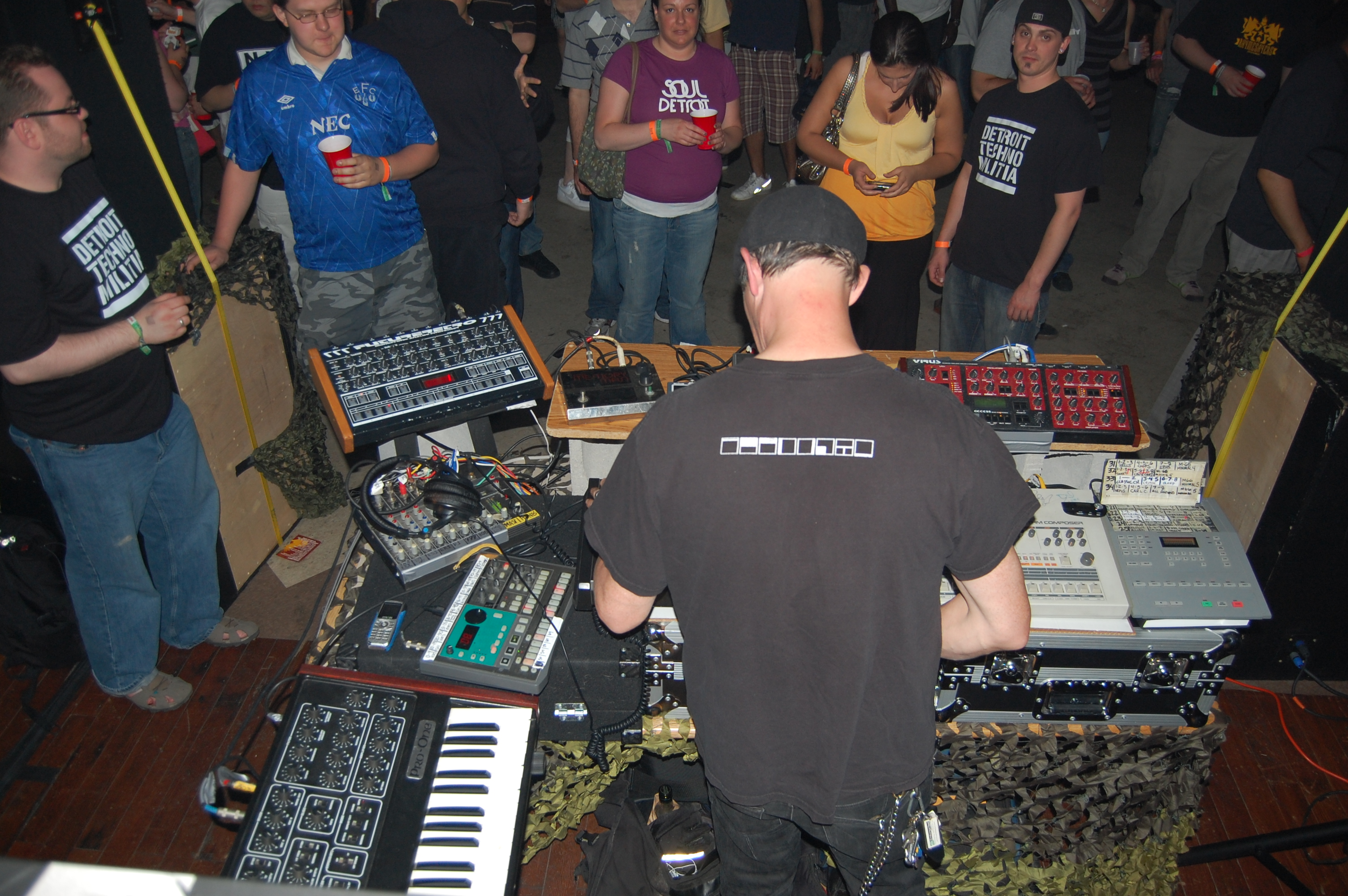
Shawn Rudiman, Festival, and the DTM FREE After Party, day one of 2009 festival

Movement 2009 took place from Saturday, May 23, 2009, thru Monday, May 25, 2009, in Hart Plaza in Detroit, Michigan. These two mobile friendly sites include information about after parties, lodging and an easy to read schedule The weekend overlapped with CouchSurfing's event CouchCrash, and with the International Sword fighting and Martial Arts Convention.

2009 Movement Lineup
- Adam Beyer
- Adultnapper
- Afrika Bambaataa
- Al Ester
- Anthony Attalla
- Anthony Rother - live
- Bad Boy Bill
- Bassnectar
- Benga
- Benny Benassi
- Busy P
- Buzz Goree
- Carl Cox
- Carl Craig
- Chloe Harris
- Chuck Gibson a.k.a. Perception – live
- Craig Gonzalez
- Damian Lazarus
- Delano Smith
- Dennis Ferrer
- Derrick May
- Drumcell
- Ellen Allien
- Exchange Bureau - live
- Flying Lotus
- François K
- Frankie Vega
- Glitch Mob - live
- Guy Gerber
- Heidi
- Henrik Schwarz, AME and Dixon present: Innervisions Live: a critical mass
- Jay Denham
- Kero
- Kevin Reynolds - live
- Kevin Saunderson
- Krazy Baldhead - live
- Lee Curtiss
- Loco Dice vs. Luciano
- Los Hermanos
- Luke Hess
- Lusine
- Mark "MK" Kinchen & Scotty Deep - live
- Marco Carola
- Mieka du Franx
- Mike Clark
- Mike Huckaby
- Neil Landstrumm - live
- Nic Fanciulli
- Nikola Baytala
- Octave One - live
- Onur Ozer
- Osunlade
- Rick Wade
- RJD2
- Seth Troxler
- Seoul vs Linder 2x4
- Shaun Reeves
- Steve Bug
- The Sight Below - live
- Tiefschwarz
- Tiga
- Wighnomy Bros
- Will Webb
- Z-Trip

=== 2010 ===
Movement 2010 took place May 29–31, 2010. This was the 10th anniversary of Detroit's yearly electronic music festival. Plastikman confirmed his appearance on his website. Other confirmed artists include Mr. Scruff, Ida Engberg, Jamie Jones, and Woody McBride.

2010 Movement Lineup
- Acid Didj
- Agoria
- Anthony "Shake" Shakir
- A-Trak
- Barem
- Booka Shade
- Cassy
- Chris Liebing
- Claude VonStroke
- Dan Bain
- Derrick Carter
- Derrick May
- Dj Dick
- Dj Godfather
- Dj Hype
- Dj Koze
- DJ Pandullo
- DJ Pierre
- DJ Sneak
- DJ Torpez
- dOP – Live
- DZ feat. Toophaced
- Excision
- Francesco Tristano - Live
- Gabe Real & Ian Desmond
- Ghostland Observatory
- Greg Gow
- Hudson Mohawke
- Ida Engberg
- Inner City
- Inxec
- ItaloBoyz
- Jake Childs
- Jamie Jones
- Jeff Risk
- Jennifer Xerri
- Jenny Lafemme
- Joel Mull
- John Acquaviva
- John Johr
- John Ryan (Dr. Disko Dust), Ron Zakrin (Goudron) and Ian Clark (Perspects, Le Car) – Live (The band later became known as Ze Dark Park)
- Josh Wink
- Kenny Larkin - Live
- Kenneth Thomas
- K-Hand
- Kid Sister - Live
- Kirk Degiorgio
- Kraak & Smaak
- Kyle Hall
- Larry Heard
- Luke Hess - Live
- Magda
- Mark Ernestus (Rhythm & Sound)
- Mauro Picotto
- Marco Carola
- Martin Buttrich - Live
- Martinez Bros
- Martyn
- Matthew Hawtin
- Mauro Picotto
- Michael Mayer
- Minx
- Monty Luke
- Mortiz Von Oswald Trio – Live
- Motel Connection – Live
- Mr. Scruff*Onur Ozer
- Niko Marks – Live
- Orlando Voorn – Live
- Paco Osuna
- Patrice Scott
- Phat Kat & Guilty Simpson w/ Will Sessions – Live
- Plastikman
- Pretty Lights - Live
- Psycatron
- Punisher
- Radio Slave
- Recloose
- Rex Sepulveda
- Ricardo Villalobos (didn´t show up)
- Rick Wilhite
- Rob Hood - Live
- Rolando
- Ryan Crosson
- Scion - Live
- Secrets - Live
- Sean Deason
- Shawn Michaels
- Simian Mobile Disco - dj set
- Sinistarr w/ MC Teddy & Bombscare
- Shigeto
- Stacey Pullen
- Starski&Clutch
- Stylophonic
- Theo Parish
- Woody Mcbride
- Yos

=== 2011 ===
Movement 2011 was held on May 28–30, 2011 and took place at Hart Plaza in Detroit, Michigan; the same location as every year since its inception. Featured artists this year include Fatboy Slim, Carl Craig, Beardyman, Felix da Housecat, and Skrillex. This year's "secret artist" listed on the lineup is Ricardo Villalobos, who, to the disappointment of many, was not allowed entrance into the US last year.

2011 Movement Lineup
- 69 (Carl Craig)
- Adam Beyer
- Al Ester
- Ambivalent
- Ana Sia
- Anthony Attalla
- Aril Brikha
- Art Department
- Ataxia
- Aux 88
- B. Bravo
- Beardyman
- Ben Klock
- Boo Williams
- Brian "Starski" Gillespie
- Bruce Bailey
- Calvertron and Figure
- Carl Craig
- Chuck Daniels
- Cio D’Or
- Clark Warner
- Claude Young
- Com Truise
- Dabura
- Daedelus
- Dam-Funk & Master Blazter
- Deepchord presents Echospace
- Delano Smith
- Deniz Kurtel
- District 909
- DJ Cent
- DJ Godfather
- DJ Harvey
- DJ T-1000
- DJ Three
- DJ X-Change
- Dr. Atmo
- DTM 5×5
- Dubfire
- Elliot Lipp
- Eric Johnson
- Erika
- Fatboy Slim
- Felix Da Housecat
- Flying Lotus
- Franki Juncaj (aka DJ 3000)
- Gaiser
- Gaslamp Killer
- Glenn Underground
- Goldie
- Green Velvet
- Guti
- Heartthrob
- Hudson Mohawke
- James Zabiela
- John Collins
- JPLS
- Justin Martin
- Kero
- Kerri Chandler
- Little Dragon
- Livio & Roby
- Loco Dice
- Marc Houle
- Marcel Dettmann
- Margaret Dygas
- Mark Flash
- Martin Buttrich
- Matt Clarke
- Matthew Hawtin
- Metro Area
- Michael Geiger
- Mike Brown
- Mike Servito
- MiM0SA
- Minx
- Monolake Surround
- N-Ter
- Nospectacle with Markus Guentner
- Paranormal
- Tek
- Paul Kalkbrenner
- Pearson Sound / Ramadanman
- Pulshar
- Reference - Brian Kage & Luke Hess
- Ricardo Villalobos
- Richard Devine
- Richie Hawtin
- Ryan Elliot
- Sammy Dee
- Scuba
- Secrets
- Shlomi Aber
- Skrillex
- Soul Clap
- Space Dimension Controller
- Space Time Continuum
- Steve Rachmad
- Sven Väth
- Terrence Parker
- The Dirtbombs
- The Siege
- tINI
- Tortured Soul
- Traversable Wormhole
- Venetian Snares
- Victor Calderone
- Visionquest

=== 2012 ===
Movement 2012 was held on May 26–28, 2012 at Hart Plaza in Detroit, Michigan; the same location as every year since its inception.

2012 Movement Lineup
- Actress
- Adam Jay
- Adventure Club
- AvA
- Andres
- araabMUZIK
- Benoit & Sergio
- Bok Bok
- Brenmar
- Brian Gillespie
- Busy P (Replaced by Gold Panda)
- Calico
- Camea
- Carl Craig
- Carlo Lio
- Cassy
- Claude VonStroke
- Chris Liebing
- Dwayne Jensen
- Dru Ruiz
- Damian Lazarus
- Daniel Andres
- Danny Daze
- Davide Squillace
- Derrick Carter
- Derek Plaslaiko
- Dillon Francis
- DJ Godfather
- DJ KA$HLESS/ Oliver Wholes
- DJ Psycho
- DJ Sneak
- dOP
- Dopplereffekt
- Droog
- Dru Ruiz
- Dwayne Jensen
- Earl Mixxin Mckinney
- Eddie Fowlkes
- Erno The Inferno
- FaltyDL
- Filsonik b2b Patrick (NY)
- Gold Panda
- Greg Wilson
- GRiZ
- Heidi
- Hot Natured: Jamie Jones & Lee Foss
- Ian Pooley
- Josh Harrison
- Jay Haze
- Josh Wink
- Juan Atkins
- Jesse Rose
- Jimmy Edgar
- John Arnold
- Kevin Saunderson
- Keys N Krates
- Kyle Hall b2b Jay Daniel
- Lindstrom
- Loco Dice
- Maceo Plex
- Major Lazer
- Malik Alston
- Mathew Jonson
- Matias Aguayo
- Marcellus Pittman
- Marco Carola
- Mark Farina (Mushroom Jazz set)
- Maya Jane Coles
- Michal Menert
- Michael Mayer
- Mike Huckaby
- Minnesota
- MK
- Monty Luke
- Mr. C
- Mr. Oizo (Could not show due to movie production)
- Mykel Waters
- Nadastrom
- Nic Fanciulli b2b Joris Voorn
- Nina Kraviz
- No Regular Play
- OktoRed
- Phil Agosta
- Photek
- Pirahnahead
- Project 313
- Public Enemy
- Pursuit Grooves
- Radio Slave
- Rick Wilhite
- Roni Size
- Ryan Richards
- Salva
- Seth Troxler b2b Guy Gerber
- SBTRKT
- Slow Hands
- Stacey Pullen
- Steve Bug
- Subb-an
- Tale of Us
- Tiger and Woods
- Tony Ollivierra
- The Martinez Brothers
- Todd Terje
- Two Fresh
- Wolf + Lamb
- Zeds Dead (Replacing Mr. Oizo)

=== 2013 ===
Movement 2013 took place on May 25–27 in Hart Plaza. The lineup for the 2013 edition of the festival includes the following 116 acts:

2013 Movement Lineup
- 16 Bit Lolitas
- A Tribe Called Red
- Adult. – live
- Al Ester
- Alton Miller
- Amtrac (musician)
- Andy C
- Annie Hall
- Art Department
- Ataxia
- Audion – live
- Azari & III – live
- Ben Klock b2b Marcel Dettmann
- Ben Sims
- Benjamin Damage - live
- Big Chocolate
- Big Gigantic – live
- Bill Patrick
- Break Science – live
- Brendon Moeller aka Echologist
- Brodinski
- Bruce Bailey
- Buzz Goree
- Cajmere
- Calico
- Carl Craig
- Carlos Souffront
- Chris Malinchak
- Chuck Daniels
- Circa Tapes
- Corbin Davis
- Dabrye
- Dan Wagner
- Daniel Bell
- Dantiez Saunderson
- Dave Clarke
- Deadbeat
- Deastro - live
- Dennis Ferrer
- Derrick May & Kevin Saunderson – The High Tech Soul Concept
- DJ Minx featuring Diviniti and Eva Soul
- Don Dada – DJ Godfather and DJ Zebo
- DJ Hatcha
- Downlink
- Drumcell
- Dubfire
- DVS1
- Ellen Allien
- Erika – live
- Francois K
- George FitzGerald
- Gesaffelstein
- Gramatik
- Gregor Tresher – live
- GRiZ – live
- Hector
- J.Phlip
- Jason Kendig
- John Digweed
- K@Dog
- Kidnap Kid
- Laura Jones
- Lucy
- Luke Slater / P.A.S. – live
- Maetrik
- Magda
- Mala
- Masters at Work – Kenny Dope & Louie Vega
- Matador – live
- Matt Tolfrey
- Midnite Jackers
- Miguel Campbell
- Mike Parker
- Milkman
- Moby – dj set
- Moodymann
- Mr. Joshooa
- Nick Hook
- Nicolas Jaar – live
- Nicole Moudaber
- Nina Kraviz
- NiT GriT
- Noisia
- Onra
- Paco Osuna
- Paper Diamond
- Phantasmagoria – live
- Reference – live
- Richie Hawtin
- Ronin Selecta w/ Bombscare
- Rrose
- Ryan Elliott
- Samo Sound Boy
- Sandoz with Marcus Flow
- Shigeto
- Silent Servant
- Sinistarr
- Slam
- Soul Clap
- Squarepusher – live
- Stacey Pullen
- Steffi
- Steve Rachmad
- Stone Owl
- SuperVision
- System of Survival
- T.Williams
- Tensnake
- Terrence Parker
- The Bug – live
- The M Machine – live
- TOKiMONSTA
- Tommy Four Seven
- Totally Enormous Extinct Dinosaurs – live
- Truncate
- xxxy

=== 2014 ===
Movement 2014 took place on May 24–26 in Hart Plaza. J. Phlip closed out Movement 2014 on the Beatport Stage after a last minute cancellation of the originally booked artist. The lineup for the 2014 edition of the festival included the following 121 acts:

2014 Movement Lineup
- Action Bronson
- Adam X - live
- Adriatique
- Altstadt Echo
- Amp Fiddler - Live
- Andres
- Anthony "Shake" Shakir
- Appian
- Aran Daniels
- Asher Perkins
- Baauer
- Ben Negative
- Benoit & Sergio - live
- Bicep
- Black Asteroid - live
- BMG
- Bonobo (DJ Set)
- Boys Noize
- Brian Sanhaji - live
- Carl Cox
- Carl Craig
- Dantiez Saunderson
- DBX - live
- Deadbeat
- Delano Smith
- Dixon
- DJ 3000
- DJ Godfather b2b DJ Zebo feat: MC Flipside
- DJ Hyperactive
- DJ Marky
- DJ Minx
- DJ Psycho
- DJ Snake
- DJ Sneak
- Donor
- DTM 2x4 DJ Seoul & T. Linder
- Dustin Zahn
- Ed Rush & Optical
- Eddie Fowlkes
- Escort - live
- Exhale
- Flosstradamus
- Function - live
- Gabi
- Golf Clap
- Green Velvet
- Heathered Pearls
- Heidi
- Jacques Greene - live
- Jamie Jones
- Jeff Mills
- Jimmy Edgar
- John Digweed
- Julio Bashmore
- Just Blaze
- Justin Martin
- Keith Kemp
- Kenny Larkin
- Kevin Reynolds - live
- Kevin Saunderson presents ORIGINS
- Kode9
- Konkrete Jungle Detroit
- Lee Foss
- Loco Dice
- Los Hermanos - live
- Luis Flores
- Maceo Plex
- Malik Alston - live
- Marco Carola
- Marques Wyatt
- Martin Buttrich
- Max Cooper
- May Roosevelt
- Metro Area - live
- Michael Mayer
- Miguel Migs
- Mike Huckaby
- Monoloc
- Monty Luke
- Moon Boots
- Moritz Von Oswald
- Move D
- Nightwave
- Niko Marks - live
- Octave One - live
- Orphx - live
- Oscar Mulero
- Perseus
- Pete Tong
- Project 313 - live
- Rai Knight
- Raíz
- Richie Hawtin
- Riff Raff feat. DJ Paul Martindale
- Robert Hood - live
- Ryan Hemsworth
- Sean Deason
- Secrets - live
- Seth Troxler
- Shackleton - live
- Shadowbox - live
- Shaun Reeves
- Simian Mobile Disco
- Skream
- Stacey Pullen
- Stacey "Hotwaxx" Hale
- Tale Of Us
- Terrence Dixon
- The Martinez Brothers
- Tiga
- tINI
- Tourist
- UR Presents: Timeline - live
- Voices From The Lake - live
- Zeitgeber (Speedy J & Lucy)

=== 2015 ===
2015 Movement Lineup
- !!!
- 313 The Hard Way (DJ Seoul b2b DJ Psycho b2b T.Linder)
- ADMN
- Al Ester
- Andy Garcia
- Annie Hall
- Annix
- Anthony Jimenez
- Anthony Parasole
- Art Department
- Ataxia
- Atom & Tobias - live
- Audiofly
- Ben Christensen
- Ben Klock
- Ben Sims
- Ben UFO
- Bob Moses – live
- Brodinski
- Bruce Bailey
- Calico
- Carl Craig
- Carl Craig feat. Mad Mike Banks – live
- Catz 'n Dogz
- Cell Injection (Drumcell + Truncate)
- Charles Trees
- Clark – live
- Classixx
- Corbin Davis
- D. Wynn
- Danny Brown
- Darkcube – live
- Derek Plaslaiko
- Developer
- Dilemma
- Dink & TK
- Disclosure - DJ set
- Dixon
- DJ Godfather feat. Good Money
- DJ Head
- DJ Minx
- DJ Snoopadelic
- Dog Blood
- Dubfire b2b Hot Since 82
- Earl "Mixxin" McKinney
- Eats Everything
- Eddie Fowlkes
- Floorplan
- Fort Romeau
- Gabi
- Gaiser – live
- Galaktis
- Greg Row
- GRiZ
- Heathered Pearls
- Henrik Schwarz – live
- Hudson Mohawke
- Jay Daniel
- Jeff Derringer
- Jets (Jimmy Edgar + Machinedrum) – live
- Joel Morgan
- Joris Voorn
- Joseph Capriati
- Josh Wink
- Joy Orbison
- JTC
- Kangding Ray – live
- Keith Kemp
- Kenny Larkin – live
- Kerri Chandler
- Kevin Saunderson
- Kevin Saunderson b2b Derrick May
- Kimyon
- KiNK – live
- Korrupt Data
- Kölsch
- Lee Foss
- Loco Dice
- Loner.9 – live
- Luciano
- Luke Hess
- Maceo Plex
- Mano Le Tough
- Marcel Dettmann
- Marissa Guzman – live
- Mark 8en Moss
- Marshall Applewhite
- Matador – live
- Matrixxman
- Matthew Dear
- Maya Jane Coles
- MCs Bombscare & Flow
- Method Man
- Midland
- Miguel Senquiz
- Mike Servito
- Milan Atkins
- MK (Marc Kinchen)
- Model 500 – live
- Neil V.
- Nick Speed
- Nicole Moudaber
- Nina Kraviz
- Octave One – live
- Oliver Dollar
- Osborne - live
- Paco Osuna
- Patrick Topping
- Paul Woolford
- Paula Temple
- People Under the Stairs
- Phuture – live
- Raybone Jones
- Recloose
- Recondite – live
- Regis
- Richie Hawtin
- Rick Wilhite
- Robert Dietz
- Rone
- Route 94
- Ryan Elliott
- RØDHÅD
- Shawn Rudiman – live
- Shigeto – live
- Sian
- Sinistarr
- Soul Clap
- Squarepusher – live
- Stacey Pullen
- Steffi
- STERAC aka Steve Rachmad
- Steve Dronez
- Ten Walls – live
- Terrence Parker
- The Saunderson Brothers
- The Valley And The Mountain
- Thread
- Tuskegee (Seth Troxler b2b The Martinez Brothers)
- Urban Tribe
- Waajeed

=== 2016 ===
2016 Movement Lineup
- 2AMFM
- Abbe & Toth
- Adam Beyer
- Al Ester
- Alex Metric
- Ame
- Amp Fiddler
- Andrei Morant
- Anja Schneider
- Art Department
- Art Payne & Keith Martin
- Barem
- Big Freedia
- Bixel Boys
- Bjarki
- Borderland
- Boys Noize
- Brian Gillespie
- Bruce Bailey
- Calico
- Caribou
- Carl Craig
- Carlos Souffront
- Chris Liebing
- Chuck Daniels
- Claude Young
- DJ Funk
- DJ Godfather
- DJ Pierre
- DJ Seoul
- DJ Tennis
- DaM Funk
- Davide Squilace
- DeWalta & Shannon
- Delano Smith
- Derek Plaslaiko
- Dilemma
- Dub Phizix $ MC Strategy
- Dubfire
- Ectomorph
- Eddie C
- Eddie Fowlkes
- Ellen Allien
- Fit Siegel
- Four Tet
- Gay Marvine
- Get Real
- Guti
- Guy Gerber
- Heidi
- Hito
- Honey Soundsystem
- Israel Vines
- J.Phlip
- Jared Wilson
- Jay Denham
- Jeff Risk
- Job Jobse
- John Digweed
- Joseph Capriati
- Josh Pan
- Justin Martin
- Kenny Dope
- Kevin Saunderson
- Kill the Noise
- Kraftwerk
- Kyle Geiger
- Kyle Hall
- La Fleur
- Laceration Selekta
- Lee Curtiss
- Len Faki
- Loco Dice
- Loren
- MC Bombscare
- Maceo Plex
- Magda
- Marc Houle
- Marc Kinchen (MK)
- Mark 8en Moss
- Marshall Applewhite
- Matador
- Matthew Dear
- Mija
- Mike Huckaby
- Mike Servito
- Mister Joshooa
- Modeselektor
- Nic Fanciulli
- Niko Maks
- Nina Kraviz
- No Regular Play
- Patrick Russell
- Paul Woolford
- Pontchartrain
- Project 313
- Rebecca Goldberg
- Rezz
- Richie Hawtin
- Rickers
- Ryan Crosson
- Ryan McCray
- RZA
- Scott Zacharias
- Scuba
- Seth Troxler
- Shade P
- Shan Reeves
- Slink
- Sonja Moonear
- Stacey Hale
- Stacey Pullen
- Stone Owl
- Tale of Us
- The Black Madonna
- The Friend
- The Saunderson Brothers
- Tiga
- Tin Man
- tINI
- Vindata
- What So Not
- Wheez-ie
- Will Sessions
- Zelooperz
- Zip

=== 2017 ===
2017 Movement Lineup
- ANNA
- AX&P (Adam X & Perc)
- Adam Beyer
- Alton Miller
- Altstadt Echo
- Ambivalent
- Anthony Jimenez
- Asher Perkins
- Ataxia – live
- Audion - live
- BXT – live
- Barclay Crenshaw
- Ben Klock
- Ben Sims b2b Truncate
- Brian Kage
- Cajmere
- Carl Cox
- Carl Craig
- Carl Craig presents Versus Synthesizer Ensemble
- Cassy
- Chris Liebing
- Coyu
- DJ Deep
- DJ Harvey
- DJ Hyperactive
- DJ Minx
- DJ Psycho
- DJ Seoul
- DVS1
- Daniel Avery
- Danny Brown
- Death In Vegas present Transmission - live
- Distal
- Dixon
- Dopplereffekt - live
- Dru Ruiz
- Drumcell
- Dusky
- Earl Sweatshirt
- Earl "Mixxin" McKinney
- Factory Floor - live
- Francesca Lombardo
- Function - live
- Gary Chandler
- Golf Clap
- Haz Mat – live
- Headless Horseman - live
- Heidi
- Honey Dijon
- InSOUL
- Jamie Jones
- John Arnold – live
- John Johr
- John "Jammin" Collins
- Joseph Capriati
- Josh Wink
- Juicy J
- Kai Alcé
- Kate Simko
- Keith Kemp
- Keith Worthy
- Kerri Chandler
- Kevin Saunderson as E-Dancer - live
- Larry Heard aka Mr. Fingers - live
- Leon Vynehall
- Luke Hess
- Mathew Jonson - live
- Matrixxman
- Michael Mayer
- Mind Against
- Mirko Loko
- Mount Kimbie - live
- Nicole Moudaber
- Norm Talley
- Octave One – live
- Octo Octa
- Orphx - live
- Paco Osuna
- Pan-Pot
- Paranoid London - live
- Patrick Topping b2b Nathan Barato
- Project 313 - live
- Rebekah Hybrid Set
- Recondite - live
- Red Axes (DJ set)
- Remote Viewing Party
- Richie Hawtin
- River Tiber
- Robert Hood - live
- Rodriguez Jr. - live
- Rrose - live
- Ryan Elliott
- S U R V I V E
- STERAC
- Scan 7 – live
- Seth Troxler
- Sheefy McFly
- Shiba San
- Sleeparchive - live
- Soul Clap - live
- Stacey Pullen
- TT The Artist
- Teklife: DJ Spinn & DJ Taye
- Terrence Dixon as Population One – live
- Terrence Parker feat. Merachka
- Testpilot
- The Belleville Three
- The Gaslamp Killer
- The Saunderson Brothers
- Thomas Barnett aka Groove Slave
- Thundercat
- Twin Cousin
- Waajeed

== Attendance ==
- DEMF 2000: 1.1 to 1.5 million (Note: Based on visual estimates by police and city officials, and conceded by city officials in 2003 to be an overly generous estimate.)
- DEMF 2001: 1.7 million
- DEMF 2002: 1.7 million
- Movement 2003: 630,000
- Movement 2004: 150,000 (Note: Reported by police on May 30, 2005.)
- Fuse-In 2005: 44,920 (Note: 41,220 ticketholders, plus 3,700 DJs, VIPs, and press, reported by The Detroit News and The Detroit Free Press on June 2, 2005.)
- Movement 2006: 41,000 (Note: 41,000 tickets, quoted by Kevin Saunderson in Big Shot magazine)
- Movement 2007: 43,337 (Note: Reported by The Detroit Free Press on May 27, 2008.)
- Movement 2008: 75,000
- Movement 2009: 83,322
- Movement 2010: 95,000
- Movement 2011: 99,282
- Movement 2012: 107,343

== See also ==
- List of electronic music festivals
- Detroit International Jazz Festival
