= Lovebox Festival =

Annual music festival in London, England

Coordinates: 51°32′13.2″N 0°2′16.8″W

Lovebox
- Genre: Electronic; Dance; Hip hop; RnB
- Dates: 12–14 June
- Locations: Gunnersbury Park, London, England (2018-2019)
- Years active: 2002 – 2020, Returning 2026
- Capacity: 50,000
- Website: www.loveboxfestival.com

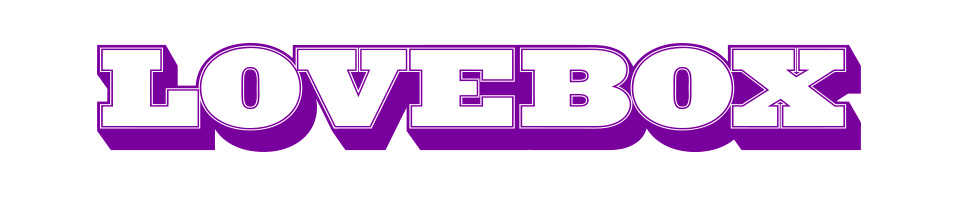
Lovebox

Lovebox is a two-day British music festival, founded by DJs Groove Armada, held annually in London, England between 2002 and 2020. The festival was most recently held in Gunnersbury Park, London in 2019. It is due to return in 2026 but taking place at Dreamland in Margate

Lovebox has also hosted clubnights across London and events in Brighton, Dublin, Belfast, Edinburgh, Newcastle and Ibiza, as well as an annual summer boat party, which ran until 2008.

== History ==
DJ duo Groove Armada began Lovebox as a resident club night at London venue 93 Feet East in 2002. In 2003 to celebrate the first anniversary of the night, the pair hosted the first outdoor Lovebox event. The one-day event was held at the end of June 2003, on Clapham Common with a capacity of 10,000. Tickets for the event sold out in two days. The event consisted of one live main stage, three smaller dance stages plus bars and food stalls.

In 2004, the event was repeated with an expanded capacity of 20,000. The event sold out within three days. Lovebox also hosted a sister festival on Newcastle Racecourse followed by an after party.

In 2005, Lovebox moved to Victoria Park in Tower Hamlets. The festival expanded to two days and a capacity of 25,000. The event was co-headlined by Groove Armada and Mylo and featured four dance tents, two cabaret arenas, a 1900s Spiegel tent and a funfair.

By 2009, Lovebox had increased to a capacity of 50,000 and a 40-acre (160,000 m^{2}) site. For 2010, the festival was expanded to a three-day event, but from 2014 was reduced back to a two-day event.

In 2018, the festival moved to Gunnersbury Park, London. The move came after Tower Hamlets turned down its application to continue in Victoria Park and Lambeth residents objected to its move to Brockwell Park.

The 2020 event was cancelled due to the COVID-19 pandemic, and the festival not been held since.

== Festival culture ==
Despite starting out as a predominantly dance festival, Lovebox has since expanded to include a wide variety of musical genres including hip hop, indie, rock, grime, world and pop, as well as circus performers, cabaret and fringe acts. In 2009 the festival hosted seven stages, supported by various partnerships from brands including Gaymers Cider, Relentless and Rizla.

By 2015, the festival had hosted twelve stages, in association with partnerships from brands including Noisey, BBC Radio 1Xtra, Essential Mix, Thump Records, Mountain Dew and Corona.

Lovebox is also known for being a very creative-led event, with stages and areas being elaborately built and dressed. The 2009 festival site featured a tree house, a bowling alley, a vintage fashion fair and a healing and massage area as well as several themed bars and eating areas.

In 2014, Secret Productions, co-organisers of Secret Garden Party and co-founders of Wilderness, joined Lovebox. Ever since, the site has also hosted art installations, a roller disco, walkabout acts and themed bars.

Due to its urban setting whilst still encompassing features of rural festivals, Lovebox has been described as an “urban-based-yet-rural-feeling, multi-dimensional festival – without the camping or the endless tramping about.”

Lovebox Festival has won a selection of awards. In 2006, it won Virtual Festivals Party People Award for Dance Music. In 2008 Lovebox won the UK Festival Award for Best Medium-Sized Festival.

== Previous events ==
=== Lovebox 2002 ===
Resident club night at 93 Feet East, hosted by Groove Armada.

=== Lovebox 2003 ===
First outdoor event featured shows from Groove Armada, Norman Jay, The Blackbyrds, Movement plus others

=== Lovebox 2004 ===
Performers included Groove Armada, Ozomatli, Richie Havens, Loose Cannons, Norman Jay, Joey Negro, Mr Scruff, Rob Da Bank plus others.

=== Lovebox 2005 ===
Featuring Groove Armada (live), Mylo (live) Plantlife (live), DJ Cash Money, Norman Jay, Gilles Peterson, Joey Negro, Bugz in the Attic, Ashley Beedle, The Others plus additional acts across two days.

=== Lovebox 2006 ===
Performers included Groove Armada, Jamiroquai, Candi Staton, Hot Chip, Jimmy Cliff, Gogol Bordello plus others.

=== Lovebox 2007 ===
The 2007 festival featured performances Groove Armada, Sly and the Family Stone, Soul II Soul, The B-52's, Blondie, Super Furry Animals plus others.

=== Lovebox 2008 ===
Performers included Manu Chao, The Flaming Lips, Groove Armada, Goldfrapp, Roni Size, The Human League.

=== Lovebox 2009 ===
Headliners: Groove Armada, Duran Duran, Doves, N.E.R.D., Florence and the Machine, Simian Mobile Disco, Friendly Fires, Rodrigo y Gabriela. Plus performances from Alan Pownall, Andy Butler (Hercules & Love Affair), Annie Nightingale, Au Revoir Simone, Bill Brewster & Frank Broughton (DJ History/Lowlife), Black Joe Lewis, Bombay Bicycle Club, Chairlift, Chew Lips, Chipmunk, Daisy O'Dell, Dan Black, Dananananaykroyd, David Shrigley, Datarock, Diplo, Disco Bloodbath, DJ Sneak, Drums Of Death, Fenech-Soler, Filthy Luka AKA Luke Howard, Fontan, Frankmusik, Gang of Four, Gary Numan, Giles Smith, Gruff Rhys, Hip-Hop Karaoke, Horse Meat Disco, Hypnotic Brass Ensemble, Idjut Boys, James Priestley, Jazzie B, Joakim, Joey Negro, Johnny D, Justin Robertson, Ladyhawke, Late Night Audio, Magistrates, Matt Berry, MPHO, Mr Hudson, N*E*R*D, New York Dolls, Nextmen, Nisennenmondai, Noah and the Whale, Norman Jay, Ou Est Le Swimming Pool, Richard Norris (Beyond the Wizard's Sleeve), Rokia Traore, The Rumble Strips, secretsundaze, Severino, Stuart Patterson & Leo Elstob, Swimming, The Temper Trap, The Death Set, The Emperor Machine, The Jive Aces, The RGBs, The Twelves, Tom Maddicott, Tommy Reilly (Scottish musician), VV Brown, Wave Machines, X-Press 2, Young Fathers, Dananananaykroyd

=== Lovebox 2010 ===
Roxy Music, Dizzee Rascal, Grace Jones, Chase & Status, Bombay Bicycle Club, Matt Henshaw, Ellie Goulding, Derrick Carter, Scissor Sisters, Mark Ronson, Hot Chip,

=== Lovebox 2011 ===
Headliners included: The Wombats, Snoop Dogg, Blondie, Scissor Sisters, Kelis, Robyn, Jessie J, Warren G, Tha Dogg Pound

=== Lovebox 2012 ===
Friday Main Stage: Hot Chip, Crystal Castles, Magnetic Man, Sub Focus (Live), Madeon, Devlin, We Have Band

Saturday Main Stage: Groove Armada, Friendly Fires, Emeli Sandé, Maverick Sabre, Kelis, Little Dragon, Norman Jay, Delilah, Soul II Soul

Sunday Main Stage: Grace Jones, Lana Del Rey, Chaka Khan, Chic, Crystal Fighters, The Rapture, Sam Sparro, Niki & The Dove, and Mika.

=== Lovebox 2013 ===
Headliners: Plan B, Azealia Banks, Goldfrapp, Jurassic 5, D'Angelo, Hurts, Rudimental, Netsky (Live), Lil' Kim (cancelled), Kelis, Lianne La Havas, AlunaGeorge, MS MR, Foreign Beggars.

Plus performances from: A Love From Outer Space, A-Trak, Amplify Dot, Andrew Weatherall, Andreya Triana, Annie Mac, Antics, Art Department, Artwork, Auntie Flo, B-Traits, Ben Seagren, Benoit & Sergio (Live), Bicep, Big Deal, Bipolar Sunshine, Bobby Champs, Breach, Buttoned Down Disco, Camo & Krooked, Charlie Wilson, Chloe Howl, Cottam, Dan Beaumont, Danny Byrd, Darren Grayson, Dauwd, David Rodigan MBE, Death on the Balcony, Derrick Carter, Disclosure (DJ set), DISTRIKT, DJ Harvey, DJ Kramer, DJ Yoda, Dolan Bergin, Dre Skull, Duke Dumont, Eric Duncan, Factory Floor, Fear of Men, Flying Lotus, Force of Nature, Frankie Knuckles, Fred V & Grafix, Ghostpoet, Gold Panda, Greenmoney, Hannah Holland, Heidi, High Contrast, Horse Meat Disco, Idjut Boys, Idles, Infinity Ink, IntroducingLive, Iration Steppas, James Hillard, Jamie Jones, Jayo & Andy George, Jazzie B, Jim Stanton, Jodie Harsh, John Newman, John Talabot, Jon Hopkins, Jonny Woo & Friends, Josef Salvat, Julio Bashmore, Kenny "Dope" Gonzalez, Kim Ann Foxman, Kindness (DJ set), Krankbrother, Kris Di Angelis, Kwabs, Le Carousel, Lee Foss, London Elektricity, Luke Howard, Lulu James, Lung, Mark Ashley Dupe, Mark Ronson, Matt Kramer, Mausi, Mele, Metrik, Mia Dora, Miss Kittin (Live), Moko, Monki, Moxie, Mykki Blanco, No Artificial Colours, NU:Logic, Oddisee, Olivier St Louis, Owlle, Paul Geddes, Paul Kalkbrenner, PBR Streetgang, Prins-Thomas, Purity Ring, Quadron, Rainy-Milo, Redlight, Richy Ahmed, Roscius, Rudi Zygadlo, S.P.Y., Sam & The Womp, SBTRKT (DJ set), Scruffizer, Sean Johnston, Seb Chew, Severino, Sid Batham, Simon Shackleton, Solomun, Splashh, Subb-An, Tayo, The Correspondents, The Gaslamp Killer, The Lovely Jonjo's, The Portillo Moment, The Revenge, Toddla T Sound, Unit 7, Venum Sound, Voyeur, Wiley and Zebra Katz.

=== Lovebox 2014 ===
Headliners: Chase & Status, M.I.A

Plus performances from: A$AP Rocky, Katy B, Soul II Soul, Breach, David Rodigan, Bipolar Sunshine, Jess Glynne, Annie Mac, Sub Focus live, Moderat live, Theo Parrish live, Crystal Fighters, Bonobo live, Kenny Dope, Adam Beyer, Duke Dumont, Joey Bada$$, Woodkid, The Horrors, DJ EZ, Shy FX & Stamina MC, Joy Orbison, Paul Woolford, Benji B, The Gaslamp Killer, Woodkid, BANKS, Mount Kimbie, Dimitri from Paris, Hercules & Love Affair, The Martinez Brothers, Craig Charles, Norman Jay, Tensnake, Soul Clap, Scuba, Ben Pearce, Monki, Route 94, Kiesza, Cyril Hahn, Roosevelt, Mirror Signal, Bondax live, Klangkarussell, Soul Clap, Throwing Snow, Elli Ingram, Hannah Wants and Special Request.

=== Lovebox 2015 ===
Headliners: Rudimental, Snoop Dogg
Plus performances from: Gabriel Antoinette, Rebelution, Cypress Hill, Mark Ronson, David Rodigan, Ella Eyre, Ivy & Gold, Karen Harding, Skepta, MK, Hercules & Love Affair, Redlight, Shadow Child, Catz 'N Dogz, Friend Within, Bontan, 99 Souls, SG Lewis, Action Bronson, Shy FX & Stamina MC, Goldie, Preditah, My Nu Leng, Novelist, Little Simz, Siobhan Bell, Groove Armada, Acid Mondays, PBR Streetgang, Brodanse, Kaytranada, Dusky, Boddika, B. Traits, Jimmy Edgar, Dolan Bergin, Gilles Peterson & Earl Zinger, XXXY, Max Graef, Alex Wolfenden, B2B, Negghead, Kiwi, Marc Roberts, Flying Sorcerer, 22 Tracks, Chris P Cuts, Alexander Nut, Krystal Klear, Ossie, Hannah Faith, The Love Below, Kasra V, Hot Chip, Jozeff, Jessie Ware, Annie Mac, Raury, Lion Babe, Craig Charles, Little Dragon, Bonobo, Flight Facilities, Danny Brown, Vaults, Kiko Bun, Rag'n'Bone Man, April Towers, Kerri Chandler, Scuba, Joy Orbison, Ben UFO, Heidi, Kim Ann Foxman, Soul Clap, Krankbrother, Jackmaster, Matador, Yousef, Marc Maya, De La Swing, Squarepusher, Flume, Nils Frahm, Special Request, Maribou State, Howling, Dornik, Greg Wilson, Craig Richards, Pedestrian, Jazzie B, Horse Meat Disco, Pete Herbet, PBR Streetgang, Peak & Swift (Renate), Psychemagik, Felix Dickinson and Bobby Pleasure (20/20 Vision).

=== Lovebox 2016 ===
Headliners: Major Lazer, LCD Soundsystem

Plus performances from: Run the Jewels, Jungle, Jack Garratt, Katy B, Stormzy, Chet Faker, Miike Snow, Diplo, Luciano, Ricardo Villalobos, Hannah Wants, Kano, MØ, Chronixx, Giggs, George Clinton, Daphni, Joris Voorn, Heidi, David Rodigan, Norman Jay and Nightmares On Wax.

=== Lovebox 2017 ===
Headliner: Jess Glynne, Frank Ocean
Plus performances from: AJ Tracey, Rag'n'Bone Man, Mac Miller, Ray BLK, Mick Jenkins, New Gen, Rex Orange County, and Charlotte Day Wilson.

=== Lovebox 2018 ===
Headliner(s): Childish Gambino, Skepta
Other acts: SZA, The Internet, N.E.R.D., Diplo, Annie Mac, Anderson .Paak & The Free Nationals, Big Boi, Dave and Kali Uchis

=== Lovebox 2019 ===
Headliner(s): Solange, Chance the Rapper
Other acts: J Hus, 2 Chainz, Giggs, Slowthai, Lizzo, Four Tet, Annie Mac, Brockhampton, Kaytranada, Action Bronson, Loyle Carner and Cypress Hill

=== Lovebox 2020 ===
The event was postponed until June 2021 due to the COVID-19 pandemic, but did not take place.

Headliner(s): Tyler, the Creator, Khalid, Disclosure
Other acts: Anderson .Paak & The Free Nationals, Charli XCX, FKA Twigs, Hot Chip, Jorja Smith, Little Simz, Mabel, Celeste, Tierra Whack, Goldlink

== See also ==
- List of electronic music festivals
