= Buttoned Down Disco =

Former clubnight in London

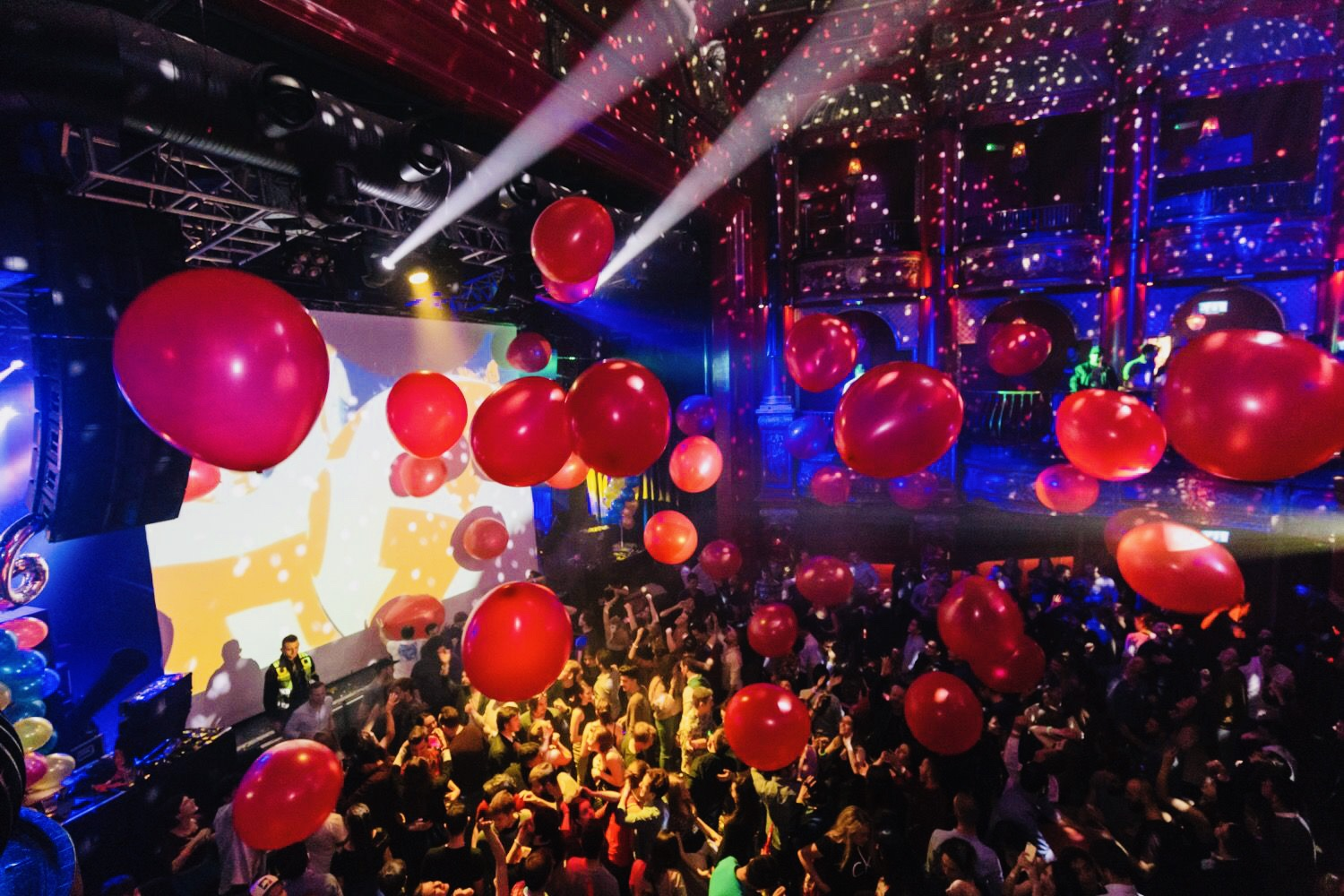
Buttoned Down Disco at KOKO, May 2017

Buttoned Down Disco was a large and long-running indie and electro clubnight that was established in London in 2002 by Christian Laing and Rachel Laing. While Christian served as the resident DJ and promoter, Rachel was responsible for the clubnight's branding, marketing, and technology. Following Rachel's resignation in 2019, Christian took over the management of the event until 2022 when it closed, having run for exactly 20 years. Buttoned Down Disco has hosted parties in more than 50 different London venues and received extensive coverage from leading publications such as The Guardian, The Independent and The Times.

The first night was in October 2002. The location of the club was revealed after an electronic invitation was requested—a pioneering concept at the time. In 2006, Buttoned Down Disco became a resident at KOKO. Buttoned Down Disco has also taken place in major festivals including Glastonbury, Lovebox, Reading and Latitude.

Buttoned Down Disco took its name from the third track from Cornershop's disco inspired album Disco and the Halfway to Discontent as part of their side-project, Clinton. The club then influenced the song "M.R.S.T." by The Electric Riot where "Buttoned Down Discos" were mentioned in the lyrics.
