= DC10 (nightclub) =

Nightclub on Ibiza

- Interactive map of DC10
- Location: Ibiza, Spain
- Coordinates: 38°52′48″N 1°23′30″E
- Capacity: 1,500
- Type: Nightclub
- Events: techno, house

Construction
- Opened: 1999

Website
- DC10 on Facebook

DC10 is a nightclub located in Ibiza on the Carretera of Salinas. It started during the 90s as a music bar and began with a license for just 80 people, opened by two Spanish brothers, Deogracias lara Moreno and Antonio Lara Moreno. In 1999, Italian promoters Antonio Carbonaro and Andrea Pelino joined in force, becoming partner at DC10, and creating the Circoloco brand, which would soon become the Monday event during each Ibiza season.

In 2020, the nightclub was voted 19th on the "Top 100 Clubs" list by the readers of DJ Magazine.

To celebrate the 25th anniversary in 2024,”DC10 Ibiza CircoLoco Greatest Hits” was released.

== History and description ==
=== DC10 venue ===
Over the years, the venue, which had started with the licence for a music bar, grew to an event hall with a capacity of 1,500 people. The nightclub is divided into three rooms, La Terrace, The Main Room and The Open Air Garden, each of which is dedicated to a different genre of music. DC10 is open two to three nights a week.

=== Circoloco event ===
Circoloco
- Genre: Club nights
- Frequency: Weekly on Mondays
- Venue: DC10, etc.
- Years active: 1999–present
- Organiser: Circoloco
- Website: Circoloco on Facebook

The Circoloco event at DC-10 initially began as a free after-party on Monday mornings, starting at 6am and going on until 6 pm.

The old logo, showing the hangar theme of the club

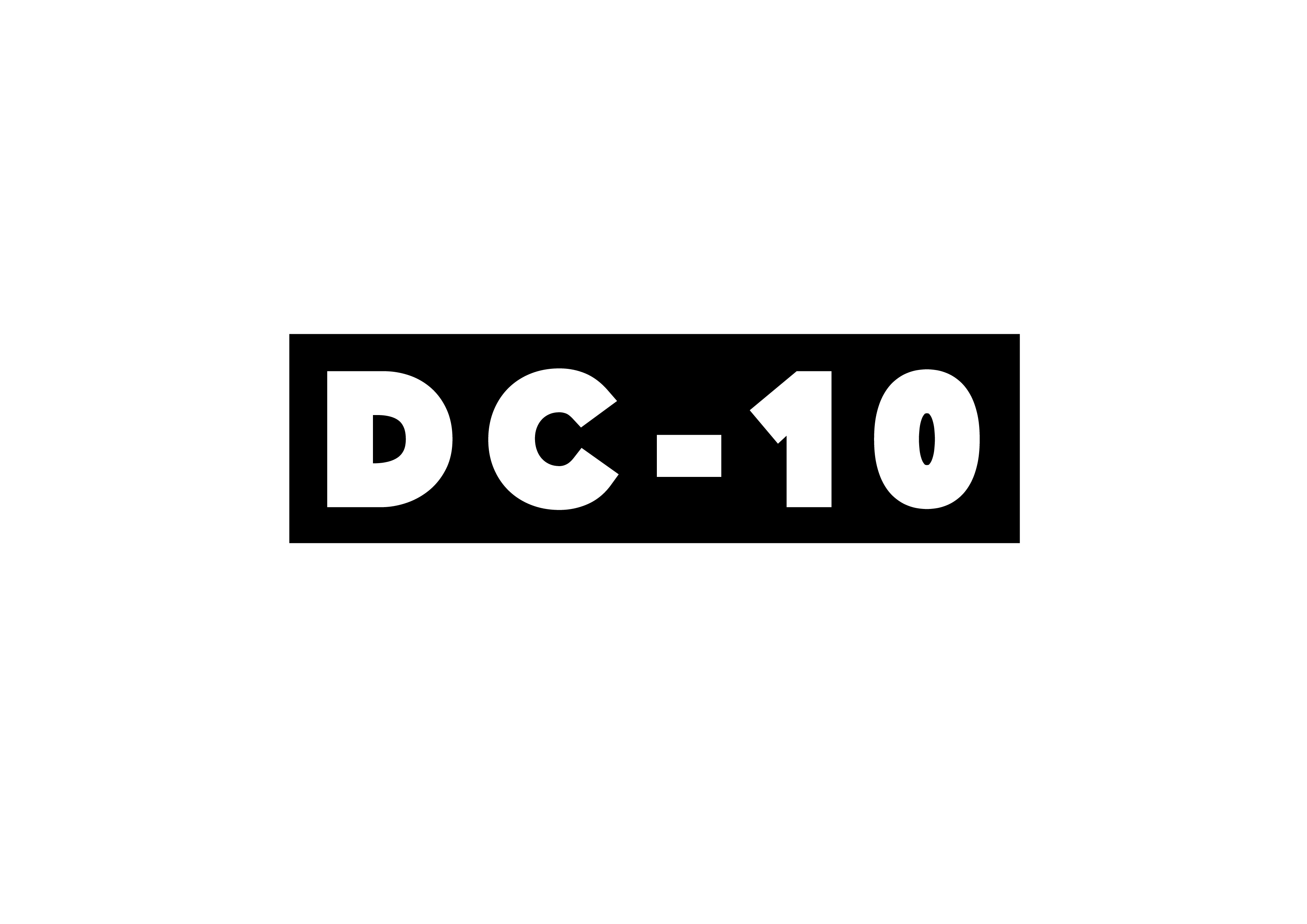
Official logo for DC-10

In contrast to other nightclubs on the Ibiza island, Circoloco still does little or no publicity for its parties. International DJs who played at Circoloco include Skrillex, Disclosure, Luciano, Loco Dice, Ricardo Villalobos, Seth Troxler, The Martinez Brothers, Damian Lazarus, Jamie Jones, Peggy Gou, Chris Stussy, Luke Dean, Black Coffee, Tale Of Us, &ME, and Amelie Lens.

In 2019, DC10 announced it would ban single-use plastic from the event and offer recyclable water bottles instead.

Since 1999 Circoloco proposed every year to its crowd the slogan of their season, which is like the motto of the summer. Starting in 1999 with "Ibiza Monday Session" to "Sorry We Are Circoloco" was a succession of statements year after year.

In addition to its events at the DC10 nightclub, the Circoloco brand has held events worldwide in cities such as New York City, Miami, London, Milan, Paris, Amsterdam, Tel Aviv, Istanbul, Rio de Janeiro, Buenos Aires, Bogotà, Tokyo, Kuala Lumpur, Phuket, Sydney and Melbourne.

In 2018, fashion designer Virgil Abloh dedicated a capsule collection to the Circoloco event.

== Noise restrictions ==
In October 2017, Diario de Ibiza reported DC10 being charged by local police for exceeding noise restrictions for their closing party.

== See also ==
- List of electronic dance music venues
- Superclub
