= Detroit Techno Militia =

Grass roots collective of DJs and producers

Detroit Techno Militia is a grass roots collective of DJs and producers located in Detroit, MI on a mission to promote Detroit Techno around the world. They compare their mission to restoring an old building. Musically, they believe that Detroit has a lot to offer, and they want to make sure the rest of the world knows about it.

After years of incorporation, in early 2007 Detroit Techno Militia formally launched their record label with a distribution deal from Cratesavers Muzik. After three very successful 12" vinyl EP releases, DTM001, DTM002, and DTM003, they amicably split with Cratesavers and took all of the responsibilities in-house. Their next two 12" vinyl EPs, DTM004, and DTM005 were independently released and distributed. Today, the Detroit Techno Militia continues to release music on their own vinyl label, their digital label: "DTM Digital", and several other internationally distributed record labels.

The Detroit Techno Militia also features ensemble acts with multiple DJs performing on multiple turntables at the same time. In the summer of 2007, the DTM 5x5 was formed. The DTM 5x5 was the first group in the Techno genre to feature five DJs (Darkcube, T.Linder, DJ Seoul, Neil V. and DJ Psycho) performing together on five analog turntables. On April 17, 2010, at The Fillmore Detroit, Detroit Techno Militia won the Detroit Music Awards Electronic/Dance Category: Outstanding Electronic Music Group, following in the footstep of previous winners and Detroit legends: Carl Craig and Amp Fiddler. Their groundbreaking performance on the Made In Detroit Stage at the 2011 Movement: Detroit Electronic Music Festival stands out as one of the most memorable sets at the three-day festival.

In 2013, Detroit Techno Militia launched their first internet podcast called The Grid. The two-hour show is broadcast on Burst Radio in Detroit.

== Discography ==
=== Selected singles and EPs ===
Vinyl records

- DTM001 Mercenary, The (4) / Loner.9 / Sougon, 2007
- DTM002 T.Linder, 2007
- DTM003 T.Linder Feat. Blak Tony, 2007
- DTM004 DJ Seoul (2) / Mercenary, The (4) / Darkcube, 2009
- DTM005 Dimitri Pike / Annix / T.Linder, 2010
- DTM006 Shawn Rudiman, 2013

Digital releases

- DTMD001 T.Linder "War at 313.3", 2011
- DTMD002 Darkcube "Fogbank EP", 2012
- DTMD003 Loner.9 "Step and Fetch", 2012
- DTMD004 Annix "Pandorica", 2012
- DTMD005 Dimitri Pike "Russell EP" 2012
- DTMD006 Shawn Rudiman "Monolithic Soul - Installment I (Limited Edition)", 2013
- DTMD007 Shawn Rudiman "Monolithic Soul - Installment II (Limited Edition)", 2013
- DTMD008 Shawn Rudiman "Monolithic Soul - Installment III (Limited Edition)", 2013
- DTMD009 Shawn Rudiman "Monolithic Soul - Installment IV (Limited Edition)", 2013

Releases on other labels

- CSI 003 Detroit Techno Militia "Midnight Madness", 2011

=== DJ-mixes and compilations ===
- T.Linder / No Retreat. No Surrender, 2002
- T.Linder / Cut:Thrust, 2003
- T.Linder / Midnight Funk Aggression, 2004
- T.Linder / Electrofying Elements 1, 2004
- T.Linder / Electrofying Elements 2, 2004
- T.Linder / Global Assault, 2010
- DJ Seoul / Resonance, 2010
- DJ Psycho / THE DUNGEON SERIES - The Stairs, 2011
- Dimitri Pike / DTM:RECON313, 2012
- DJ Psycho / A unica forma de luta, 2012
- DJ Psycho / Bwaanzhii-Niimiidiwin (War Dance), 2012
- T.Linder & DJ Seoul / DTM2x4 DJmix, 2012
- T.Linder / Liver Noise remixes January 2016
