= Luke Dean (DJ) =

British DJ and producer

- Born: Luke Dean; 1 February 2003 (age 23); London, United Kingdom
- Genres: Deep tech; deep house; house; tech house; minimal tech
- Occupations: Record producer; DJ
- Years active: 2020–present
- Website: lukedean.komi.io

Luke Dean (born London, United Kingdom) is a British DJ and producer.

Luke Dean has released music on well-known record labels such Constant Sound, neXup, Belief, MicroHertz and Locus London. His songs include "Make Believe'", "Get Hard (You In The Lobby)", "Gets Like That", "The Finest" and “Supa Smoov". His most famous single, "Can’t Decide" has been streamed over 76 million times on Spotify.

== Career ==
Luke Dean has been making music since he was 11 and got his first decks at 14. When he saw his older cousin Max making money as a DJ he realised there was a potential in electronic music. The artist's style of music production is described as "infusing the spirit of ‘90s Chicago house with classy, contemporary flair". Derrick Carter, Cajmere and Marshall Jefferson are some of his inspirations.

His breakout track “Get Hard (You In The Lobby)” became a viral success in 2023, boosting streaming traction and performance bookings.

He has performed at Fabric London, DC10, The Warehouse Project, and After Caposile.

Luke Dean has also performed international clubs and festival bookings, including Do Not Sleep, Solid Grooves and Paradise in Ibiza, FLY Open Air in Scotland, and tours in Australia.

The artist's hit single 'Can't Decide' in collaboration with Max Dean and Locky won 'Best Track' at DJ Mag Best of British Awards 2025.

== Discography ==
=== Singles and EPs ===
- To The Call (2020)
  - To The Call (with Manu Gonzalez)
- Just the 1 EP (2022)
  - Just The 1
  - Wanna Be
  - 10am
  - Just The 1 – Madvilla Remix
- Sounding Different EP (2023)
  - Sounding A Bit 90's
  - How You Baby
  - Strictly Different
  - Goin On
- Diss You Right EP (2023)
  - Diss You Right
  - Gimme A Break
- Silly People EP (2023)
  - Silly People
  - U Doin It?
  - Watcha Want?
- You On Tha List (2023)
  - You On Tha List
- Get Hard (You In The Lobby) (2023)
  - 'Get Hard (You In The Lobby)
- Get Hard (You In The Lobby) [Underground Mix] (2024)
  - 'Get Hard (You In The Lobby) - Underground Mix
- Ready Set Go EP (2024)
  - Ready Set Go
  - Baby's On The Decks
  - Pump It
  - Rock Wid Me
- Curveball (2025)
  - Curveball (with Max Dean and Locky)
- Can’t Decide (2025)
  - Can't Decide (with Max Dean and Locky)
- Can’t Decide (Extended) (2025)
  - 'Can't Decide (Extended) (with Max Dean and Locky)
- Get Busy EP (2025)
  - Get Busy
  - Party Time
  - Coast2Coast
- Make Believe (2025)
  - Make Believe (with Omar+)
- The Finest EP (2025)
  - The Finest (with Max Dean)
  - Gets Like That (with Max Dean)
  - Touch Me (with Max Dean)
  - Like You (with Max Dean)
- Supa Smoov EP (2025)
  - Supa Smoov (with Locky)
  - Where's The Party At? (with Locky)
  - Dubplate Style (with Locky)
  - Das Das Shi (with Locky)
- Party Sampler 001 (2026)
  - This Heat
- Back to the 305 (2026)
  - Back to the 305 (with Omar+)
- Zero Degrees EP (2026)
  - JUMP (with Ozzie Guven)
- Check One, Check Two (2026)
  - Check One, Check Two (with Locky, Jme)

=== Remixes ===
  - Feel Much Better – Max Dean, Nafe Smallz, Timbaland (Luke Dean Remix) (2025)
  - Puff Puff Pass - Kitty Hall (Nafe Smallz & Luke Dean Remix) (2026)
