= The Martinez Brothers =

American music duo

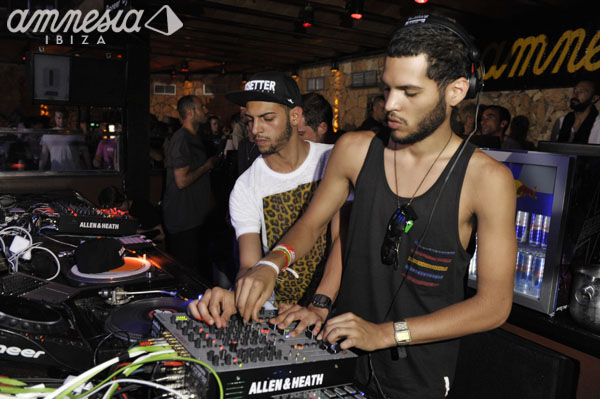

Background information
- Also known as: Martinez Bros, TMB
- Origin: The Bronx, New York, U.S.
- Genres: House, techno, tech house, hip hop
- Years active: 2007–present
- Labels: Objektivity, Tuskegee Records, Cuttin Headz
- Members: Steve Martinez, Chris Martinez
- Website: Website Instagram Facebook Twitter Soundcloud Youtube

The Martinez Brothers are a duo of disc jockeys, music producers, and remixers from The Bronx, New York known for their long-term residencies at clubs in Ibiza. In 2014, they were named as DJs of the year by Mixmag, who wrote that "no other DJ or DJ duo encapsulates house music in 2014 like the crown princes of DC10."

== History ==
=== Early years and founding ===
The Martinez Brothers are a house music DJ/production duo born and raised in the New York borough known as The Bronx. Steven and Chris Martinez were introduced to music from a young age, when their father took it upon himself to provide a musical upbringing, involving the boys in the church band. There they would collaborate with much older musicians, performing genres as diverse as disco, soul, and salsa. Their father eventually brought them their first set of DJ equipment, encouraging their interest in pursuing dance music as a career, and remaining supportive ever since.

=== Early club residencies ===
As the brothers grew older, and continued to work on their music production, they were increasingly exposed to New York's dance music scene. After hearing their sets, DJ Dennis Ferrer began mentoring the duo, helping them branch out through his contacts and helping them book gigs at a number of notable New York venues. Ferrer also signed them to his record label Objektivity.

In 2011, they were invited to Ibiza, Spain for their first DJ residency, where they were to begin spinning at the club Ushuaïa alongside their former tutor Dennis Ferrer. However this arrangement fell through at the last minute, and they instead approached friend and DC-10 booker, Elliot Shaw, who managed to secure a last-minute residency for the brothers. They have held regular residencies at the Ibizan club ever since.

=== Touring ===
Beyond their club residencies and performances at nightclubs such as Club Space in Miami, the duo maintained an active international touring schedule. In 2009, they performed at Electric Daisy Carnival in California to a crowd of approximately 60,000 attendees. They performed at the Detroit Electronic Music Festival for DEMF 2010 and later at DEMF 2014. In 2011, they performed at Electric Zoo Festival in Randall's Island in New York City, and the IndepenDANCE Pool Party in Miami. In 2012, they performed at Rock in Rio Lisboa V, as a headlining act at the Eletrónica Heineken stage. In 2014, they performed at festivals such as Lovebox and Creamfields in England, as well as Escapade Music Festival in Canada. They also performed at The BPM Festival held in Mexico in 2015 and at Tomorrowland in Belgium during the summer.

=== Other work ===
External videos
- "Between The Beats: The Martinez Brothers" documentary by Resident Advisor (Sep 25, 2013)
- Video of The Martinez Brothers Boiler Room Ibiza DJ Set at Boiler Room (Aug 29, 2014)

In 2014, the brothers' busy international touring schedule featured many performances on behalf of their collaborative label Tuskegee Records alongside co-label owner Seth Troxler. Tuskegee doubled up as a music and fashion label.

They worked directly with high end fashion designer Riccardo Tisci to create the soundtrack for Givenchy's menswear and women's wear fall/winter 2014 and spring 2015 collections. They have also launched their own label, Cuttin' Headz, showcasing both their own music and productions from other artists. In 2014, they were named as DJs of the year by UK dance music publication Mixmag, and as a result were placed on the front cover for the December edition of the print magazine. Mixmag wrote that "no other DJ or DJ duo encapsulates house music in 2014 like the crown princes of DC10."

Also in 2014, they were the only non-Chic cohorts to be invited by Nile Rodgers to contribute on his upcoming album It’s About Time. The Martinez Brothers added percussion on the lead single "I'll Be There". In May 2015, they released their free EP Masters at Dutch.

== Members ==
- Chris Martinez (2007–present) - deejaying
- Steven Martinez (2007–present) - deejaying

== Awards and rankings ==
Year	Award	Nominated work	Category	Result
2014	Mixmag rankings	The Martinez Brothers	The Top 20 DJs of 2014	No. 1
2022	DJ Mag's Top 100 DJs	The Martinez Brothers	Top 100 DJs	No. 100
2023	DJ Mag's Top 100 DJs	The Martinez Brothers	Top 100 DJs	No. 60

== Discography ==
=== DJ mixes ===
Year	Album title	Release details
2014	Cuttin Headz Expose	Released: Dec 11, 2014 (UK); Label: Mixmag; Format: Digital

=== Extended plays ===
Year	Title	Label	Release details
2010	Don’t No Yet	Objektivity	Vinyl/digital (in US)
2014	Tree Town	Cuttin'; Headz	Vinyl (Nov 19, 2014 in US)
2015	Masters at Dutch	Cuttin'; Headz	Digital (May 2015 in US/EUR)

=== Singles ===
Incomplete list of songs by the Martinez Brothers
Year	Title	Release type	Label	Format / release details
2007	"My Rendition"	Single	Objektivity	12" vinyl/digital
2009	"Debbie Downer" (with Argy)	2-track single/ FabricLive.51	Objektivity	Vinyl/digital (2009, US/EUR)
2009	"Day Two" (with Argy and DJ Duke)	3-track single	These Days	Vinyl (May 13, 2009, GER)
2010	"Broke in the BX"	Fabric 54	Objektivity	
2011	"The Causeway" / "Issshhh!"	Split single	Objektivity	Vinyl/digital (US)
2012	"H 2 Da Izzo"	Single	Real Tone	Vinyl/digital (FR)
2013	"The Hat Trick" (with Mass Prod)	2-track single	Cuttin' Headz	Vinyl (Sep 2013)
2014	"What's the Point" (with Point G and Filsonik)	Singles	Ever Lasting Love	Vinyl (Jun 31, 2014)
2014	"Space & Time" (with Seth Troxler)	Singles	Tuskegee Music	Vinyl (Jun 2014, GER)
2014	"I'll Be There" (with Chic featuring Nile Rodgers)	Singles	Warner Bros.	Digital/CD
2020	"Together" (with Carnage featuring Elderbrook and Mike Dean)	Singles	Ultra Records	Digital
2023	"Pleasure Peak" (with Eliza Rose)	Singles	Rosebud	Digital

== See also ==
- Seth Troxler
- List of house music artists
