= Seth Troxler =

American DJ (born 1985)

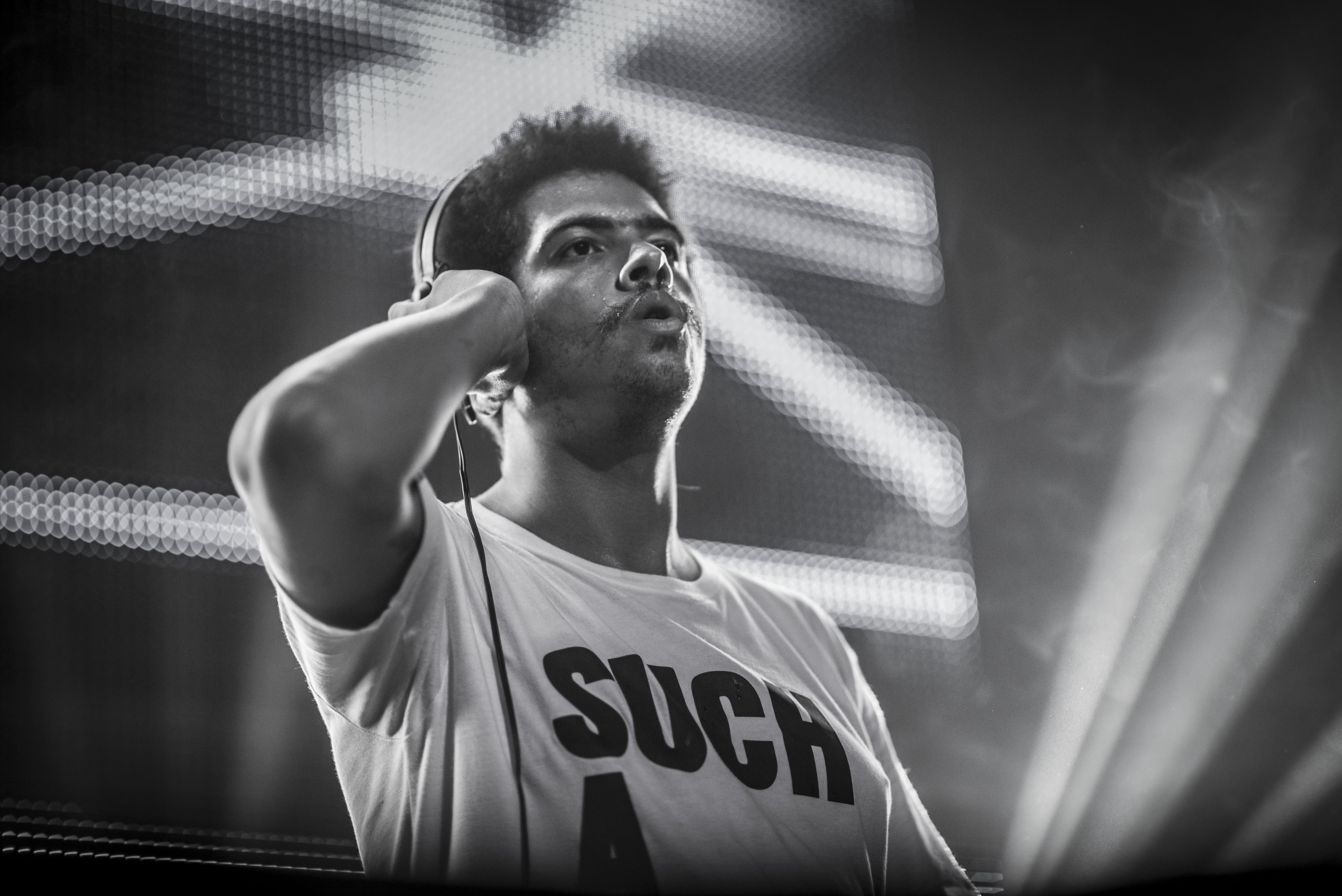

Background information
- Also known as: Sex Trothler, Thrill Cosby, Tuskegee (with the Martinez Brothers)
- Born: Seth Anthony Troxler; September 29, 1985 (age 41); Kalamazoo, Michigan, U.S.
- Genres: House, tech house, deep house, techno, minimal
- Occupations: Producer, DJ
- Years active: 2002–present
- Labels: Circus Company, Spectral Sound, Crosstown Rebels, Culprit, Moodgadget, Wagon Repair, Wolf + Lamb, Raum... musik, Souvenir

Seth Troxler is an American DJ and record producer from Lake Orion, Michigan. His DJ work focuses on house and techno, while he has produced on the Wolf + Lamb, Crosstown Rebels and Circus Company labels, collaborating with artists Art Department, Deetron, Tiefschwarz, Matthew Dear and Subb-an.

Troxler draws upon the musical heritage of Detroit and Chicago and his influences include Richie Hawtin and Moodymann. He is one of the founders of the record label Visionquest, as well as head of labels Tuskegee, Soft Touch and Play It, Say It. He owned a restaurant in East London called Smokey Tails.

== Early life ==
Troxler was born on September 29, 1985, in Kalamazoo, Michigan. His parents split up when he was two years old and his step-father hosted a local radio show in his home town. As a boy, Troxler used to listen to his step-father's radio show in the studio. Such early exposure to early house music and hip hop paved the way for Troxler to begin his career as a DJ.

When Troxler was fourteen years old, his family moved to the outskirts of Detroit, where he involved himself in the musical heritage of the city. In the 90s, Troxler went to underground techno raves, and shortly after threw his own underground parties – notably booking Magda to play for him when he was only fifteen years old. Around the same time, he landed a job as a techno buyer in the record store ‘Melodies & Memories’ 23013 Gratiot, Eastpointe Michigan, just a few blocks north of 9 mile, working alongside Reggie Harrell and Terrence Parker. His sound was influenced by underground techno legend Drew Maddox. Troxler spent countless hours trainspotting Maddox at underground techno parties during his rise to success. It was through his work at ‘Melodies & Memories’ that Troxler met his future Visionquest label-mates Ryan Crosson, Lee Curtiss and Shaun Reeves.

A week after graduating from high-school Troxler was invited on a small European tour for Omar-S’ FXHE label, playing at the German clubs Panorama Bar and Robert Johnson. Once he finished his degree in America, he decided to move to Berlin. He now tours throughout the year playing at festivals and clubs.

== Career ==
=== As a DJ ===
Troxler has played at a number of clubbing institutions such as Fabric, Circo Loco, Panorama Bar, Watergate, Warung, Womb and Robert Johnson as well as festivals like the Detroit Electronic Music Festival, ZoukOut, Glastonbury, Coachella, Wonderfruit, Sónar and Burning Man.

He was a member of the Visionquest collective which includes Ryan Crosson, Lee Curtiss and Shaun Reeves. In 2013 the four DJs undertook their Visionquest Thirteen world tour which saw take over various clubs around the world for an all night multi-deck DJ performance.

Troxler's constant touring (158 gigs in 2012) resulted in him being subsequently voted number three, two, then one in the Resident Advisor Top 100 DJs poll from 2009–2012.

=== Visionquest ===
Visionquest is both a DJ collective and record label, headed by Troxler, Ryan Crosson, Lee Curtiss and Shaun Reeves. The label has seen releases from Footprintz, Wareika, Benoit & Sergio, Tale of Us and many more. At the beginning of 2014, Troxler decided to step back from his role in Visionquest to pursue a different musical direction with some new record labels of his own.

==== Lost Souls of Saturn (LSOS) ====
In 2017, Seth Troxler and Phil Moffa created a multidisciplinary project Lost Souls of Saturn. The project combines music, performance and art.

=== Record Labels ===
In 2014 Troxler founded three new record labels: Tuskegee, Soft Touch and Play It, Say It

==== Tuskegee ====
Troxler set up Tuskegee with New York City-based DJs The Martinez Brothers - a "label of cultural heritage" exposing "more people of [Troxler and Martinez's] background, to the opportunities of electronic music and to create a platform to release music of people of ethnicity". The label has seen releases from William Kouam Djoko, Filsonik, Kyle Ridings, Ibellini, Jesse Calosso as well as a collaboration between Troxler and The Martinez Brothers.

==== Soft Touch ====
Soft Touch was set up with the intention of displaying a less 'dance oriented' side of Troxler's taste, he explains "“Soft Touch is an indie label putting out all sorts of random stuff- some folk, some rock, all limited editions. It’s about music by artists I’ve met over the years whose music is amazing but not finding its niche.” The first release was a limited 10" from Clarian, titled 'Is There A Light At The End'

==== Play It, Say It ====
Troxler's third label - Play It, Say It - draws its name from the stickers which used to appear on records in the 1980s and 1990s, where promos sent to US radio stations often had stickers on them saying, "When You Play It, Say It" to encourage disc jockeys to mention the names of the songs they were broadcasting on air. Troxler's intentions behind this label are both simple and functional: "just me putting out records that I've been field testing but have never come out. They aren't moody, the critics might hate them, but I know they work a floor and are awesome in that context. This isn't some crazy art thing, just high grade white labels to play in clubs. It's that basic." The label has seen releases from Sharam, Steve Lawler, Berkson & What, and Clarian.

=== Awards ===
- No. 1 DJ – RA Top 100 DJ Poll, 2012.
- No. 2 DJ – RA Top 100 DJ Poll, 2011.
- No. 1 Tech House DJ – Ibiza DJ Awards, 2012.
- No. 13 of 25 DJs that rule the world, Rolling Stone, 2012.

=== Smokey Tails ===
Troxler won the Amsterdam Dance Event DJ cook-off for three years in a row and subsequently judged in the competition. In August 2013, Troxler undertook a new venture, with three other collaborators, to set up the pop-up restaurant Smokey Tails in Hackney Wick – an American BBQ serving smoked meats and cocktails.

The restaurant ran for two months before moving to Dalston as part of a new venture called ’Night Tales’ which combines food, experimental bar culture and nightlife. Smokey Tails has taken over the kitchen at Hoxton Square Bar and Kitchen in Shoreditch to host his 'Midwestern modern' family recipes.

== Discography ==
=== EPs ===
- 2006: Love Bezerker [Berettamusic Grey]
- 2007: Rave Loot [Esperanza]
- 2007: Aggression [Moodgadget]
- 2008: Hot / I Like You Too [Raum... musik]
- 2008: Love Never Sleeps [Crosstown Rebels]
- 2008: Sexplosion EP [Wagon Repair]
- 2009: Panic, Stop, Repeat [Spectral Sound]
- 2009: Aphrika EP [Wolf & Lamb]
- 2015: Evangelion [Rumors]
- 2015: Just Back [Tuskegee]

=== Mixes ===
- 2009: RA.156 [Resident Advisor]
- 2010: BoogyBytes Vol. 5 [BPitch Control]
- 2010: Jamie Jones vs. Seth Troxler [Mixmag]
- 2011: The Lab 03 [NRK]
- 2014: The Illusion Nouveau (Live Mix) [Mixmag]
- 2015: DJ-Kicks [Studio !K7]

=== Collaborations ===
- 2008: Patrick Russell & Seth Troxler – "Valt Trax" [Circus Company]
- 2009: The Royal We – "Party Guilt" [Crosstown Rebels]
- 2009: Tiefschwarz ft. Seth Troxler – "Trust" [Souvenir]
- 2009: Tiefschwarz ft. Seth Troxler – "Trust (Remixes)" [Souvenir]
- 2010: Deetron ft. Seth Troxler – "Each Step" [Circus Company]
- 2010: Art Department ft. Seth Troxler – "Vampire Nightclub" [Crosstown Rebels]
- 2013: Subb-an ft. Seth Troxler – "Time" [Visionquest]
- 2014: Seth Troxler & the Martinez Brothers – "Space & Time" [Tuskegee]
- 2015: Seth Troxler & Phil Moffa – "Rogue Music" [Hypercolour]
- 2015: Seth Troxler & Tom Trago presents T & T Music Factory – "De Natte Cel"

=== Remixes ===
- 2007: Stefan Tretau – "Chittagong" [Leftout]
- 2007: Sweet n' Candy – "Dirty Gotches" (Visionquest remix) [Dumb-Unit]
- 2007: Ben Parries – "Breakfast with Thorialanus" [Loopzilla]
- 2007: Butane – "How Low Can You Go" (Visionquest remix) [Dumb-Unit]
- 2008: Nicolas Jaar – "The Student" [Wolf + Lamb]
- 2009: Mirco Violi & Fabio Giannelli – "Blues Brunch" [Adult Only]
- 2009: Cesar Merveille – "Crapette" [Safari Electronique]
- 2009: Jimmy Edgar – "Funktion" [Items & Things]
- 2009: Fever Ray – "Seven" [Rabid Records]
- 2009: Kiki – "Good Voodoo" (Visionquest remix) [BPitch Control]
- 2010: dOP & Seuil – "Prostitute" (Visionquest remix) [Eklo]
- 2010: Tracey Thorn – "Swimming" (Visionquest remix) [Strange Feeling]
- 2010: Paul Ritch & D'Julz – "RUN" (Visionquest remix) [Quartz Music]
- 2011: Azari & III – "Into the Night" (Troxler, Masemenos & Jaw) [Scion]
- 2011: Benoit & Sergio – "Boy Trouble" (Visionquest remix) [DFA]
- 2011: WhoMadeWho – "Every Minute Along" (Tale of Us & Seth Troxler edit) [Life and Death]
- 2011: Dinky – "Acid in My Fridge" (Visionquest remix) [Cocoon]
- 2012: David Lynch – "Pinky's Dream" (Visionquest remix) [Sunday Best]
- 2012: Matthew Dear – "Fighting Is Futile" [Spectral]
- 2013: Blood Orange – "Champagne Coast" (Seth Troxler & Subb-an remix)
- 2014: Hercules & Love Affair - "I Try to Talk You" (Seth Troxler extended NYC mix)
- 2014: Douglas Greed ft. Mooryc - "Driven" (Seth Troxler remix)
- 2015: !!! - "I Feel So Free" (Troxler X Moffa Lost Souls of Saturn remix)
- 2016: Kate Simko & London Electronic Orchestra - "Tilted" (Seth Troxler & Phil Moffa remix)
- 2017: Dokta - "2nd Nature" (Seth Troxler & Bas Ibellini remix)
- 2017: Dino Lenny & Doorly - "The Magic Room" (Dino Lenny & Seth Troxler re-edit)
- 2018: Mathew Jonson - "Decompression" (GMT remix)
- 2018: Merveille & Crosson - "Asleep at the Wheel" (Moffa X Troxler remix)
- 2020: Fine Young Cannibals - "She Drives Me Crazy" (Seth Troxler 'Out of Time' remix)
- 2020: Elements of Life ft. Jasper Street Company - "Stand on the Word" (Lost Souls of Saturn Colossians 3.16 mix)
- 2022: DJ Minx - "A Walk in the Park (Seth Troxler cruising remix)
- 2023: Diplo - "Waiting for You" (Kalabrese Troxler alternative mix edit)
- 2023: Louie Vega ft. Honey Dijon - "Feel So Right" (Seth Troxler remix)
- 2023: Psyche - "From Beyond" (Seth Troxler remix)
- 2023: Carla Durisch - "I Just Wanna Dance" (Seth Troxler remix)
- 2023: Figi & San Proper ft. DROMéDA - "Alive" (Seth Troxler remix)
- 2024: Rework - "You're So Just Just" (Troxler x Crosson remix)
- 2024: Blaze - "Lovelee Dae" (Seth Troxler remix)
