= Dennis Ferrer =

American DJ & producer (born 1970)

- Also known as: Aurasfere, Jax, Lost Tribes Of Ibadan, The, Son Of Raw
- Born: 26 December 1970 (age 55)
- Origin: New York City, U.S.
- Occupations: DJ, producer, remixer
- Website: Ferrer on Myspace

Dennis Ferrer (born December 26 1970) is a New York–based DJ, producer and remixer. He currently resides in Union City, New Jersey. A veteran of soulful house music production, he has worked with the likes of Masters at Work (MAW), Little Louie Vega, the Martinez Brothers and many other notable New York producers and DJs. Ferrer is also the founder of the Objektivity record label. In 2010 he released his most famous single, "Hey Hey", on Defected Records.

== Discography ==
=== Albums ===
- The World as I See It (2006)

=== Singles ===
- "Touch the Sky" (feat. Mia Tuttaville) (2007)
- "Hey Hey" (2010)
- "Sunny Days" (feat. Dawn Tallman) (2020)

=== Remixes ===
- 2004: Blaze Feat. Barbara Tucker - Most Precious Love (Dennis Ferrer Remixes)
- 2007: Fish Go Deep – "The Cure and the Cause (Dennis Ferrer Remix)"
- 2008: The Sunburst Band – Journey to the Sun (Dennis Ferrer Remix)"
- 2010: Dido – "Don't Believe in Love (Dennis Ferrer Objektivity Mix)" (nominated for Grammy Award for Best Remixed Recording, Non-Classical)
- 2012: Nick Curly – "Underground (Dennis Ferrer Remix)"
- 2014: London Grammar – "Sights (Dennis Ferrer Remix)"
- 2015: Sabb feat. Forrest – "One of Us" (Dennis Ferrer Remix)"
- 2015: Hot Chip – "Need You Now (Dennis Ferrer Remix)"
- 2018: Nasser Baker – "Say Something (Dennis Ferrer Remix)"
- 2018: Nic Fanciulli – "Imitations (Dennis Ferrer Remix)"
- 2019: Simon Harris feat. Morrison – "This Is Serious (Dennis Ferrer Remix)"
- 2026: Mathias Kaden ft. Zoë Xenia – Fyutr (Dennis Ferrer Remix)"
