= DJ Three =

American DJ from Pittsburgh

- Occupation: DJ
- Known for: House and techno DJ

DJ Three is an American DJ with focus on house and techno.

== History ==
He has held residencies at Florida's Simon's and NYC's Twilo and has played lauded guest spots with San Francisco's Wicked Crew and the UK's Fabric.

== Collaborations ==
- With David Christophere (Rabbit in the Moon) as Three A.M.
- With Michael Donaldson (Q-Burns Abstract Message) as Montage Men
- With Sean Cusick (Q6) as Second Hand Satellites
- With Derek Plaslaiko (Spectral) as "Three-D"

== Selected discography ==
- Rabbit in the Moon - Out of Body Experience (Three A.M.'s Burning Spear mix) - Hardkiss US
- Rabbit in the Moon - Floori.d.a. (Three A.M.'s Dub for Strangeways) - Hallucination US / Abnormal UK
- Second-Hand Satellites - Multiple Mirrors EP - Hallucination US / Shaboom UK
- Second-Hand Satellites - Multiple Mirrors Part 2 - new versions by S.H.S., Phillip Charles, Blakkat - Shaboom UK
- Lypid - The Sign's Alive (Montage Men dub) - Statra Recordings US
- John Creamer and Stephane K. - I Wish U Were Here - (Three A.M.'s Dub for Wanderlust) - Alternative Route UK
- U.N.K.L.E. – Reign (Three A.M.’s Black Swan Vocal mix) – GU Music US
- Mish Mash feat. Lois - Speechless (Three's Lost in Translation mix) - Crosstown Rebels
- Sasha - Coma (Three's star Spangled Remix) - White
