= Benoit & Sergio =

Dance pop and house music duo

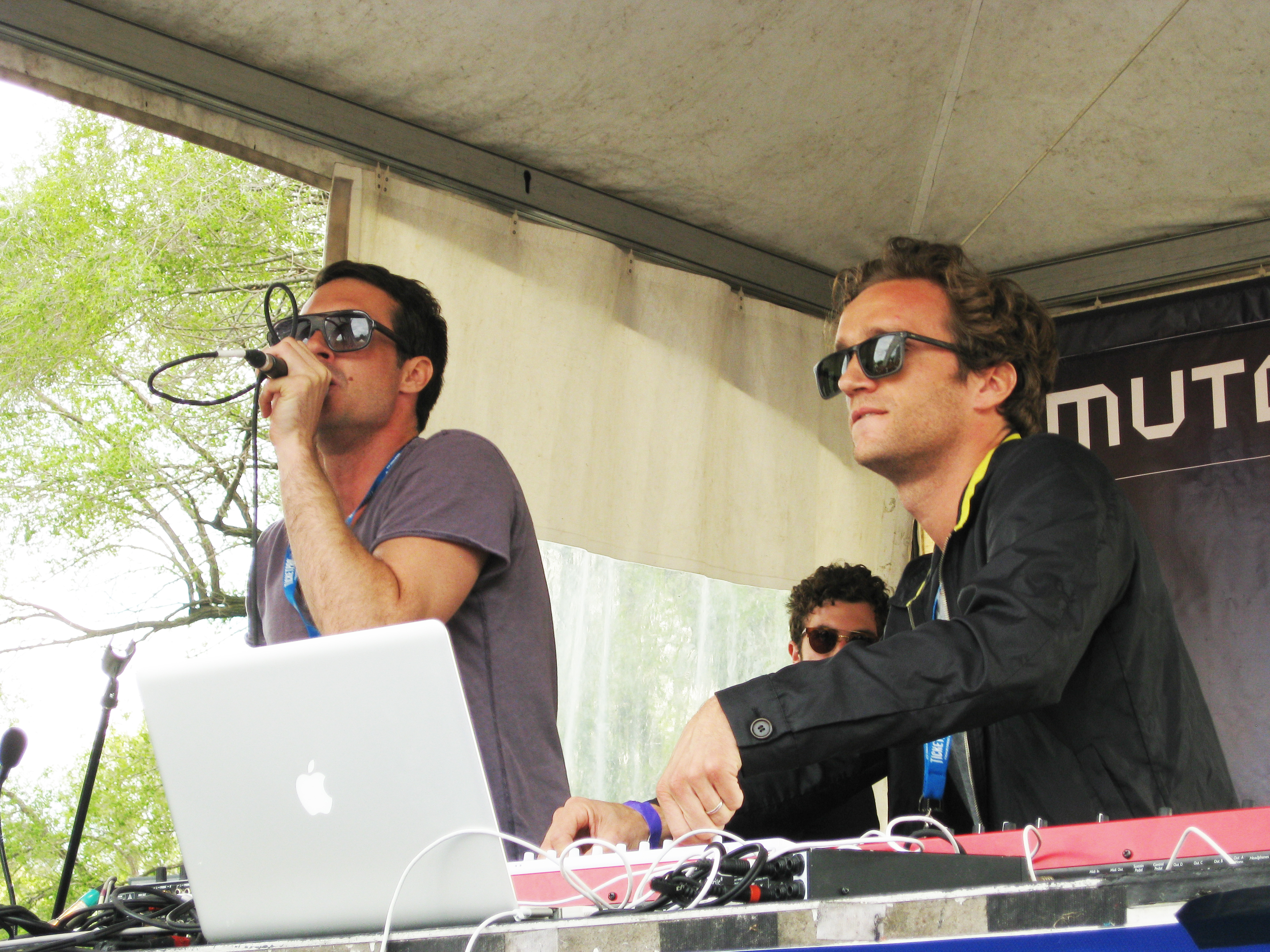
- Sergio (left) and Benoit (right) perform at the Piknic Électronik in Montreal on 3 June 2012

Background information
- Origin: Washington, D.C.
- Genres: Dance pop; House
- Years active: 2009–present
- Labels: Thesongsays; Spectral Sound; Visionquest; DFA Records; Double Standard Records; Hot Creations; Culprit; Leftroom Limited; Soul Clap Records
- Members: Benoit Simon, Benjamin "Sergio" Myers

Benoit & Sergio are a dance pop and house music duo composed of Benoit Simon and Benjamin "Sergio" Myers and based out of Washington, D.C. and Berlin. Their music has been described as an intelligent and often melancholy mix of pop and electronic music intended for dance but outside the mainstream of electronic dance music. They describe their sound as "dance pop with a slightly melancholy feel to it".

== Biography and origins ==
Benoit Simon was born and raised in Paris. From an early age, he showed an interest in the electronics, especially as they related to sound. As a youth, he created music on an Atari home computer with his childhood friend and made himself a Vocoder. He also played some guitar. Inspired by the emerging genre of French house, and by Daft Punk in particular, Simon began making electronic music in earnest in 1995. For his day job, he worked in voice recognition and speech synthesis, work that led him to move to Boston in 2002.

Benjamin "Sergio" Myers is from the small town of Fairfield, Iowa, the son of a professor. As a youth, he played rock guitar, but never wrote music or joined a band. He attended the University of Chicago as an undergraduate and then began working towards a PhD in Renaissance literature at Johns Hopkins. After a DJ friend introduced him to the electronic music scene in Berlin one summer, he was inspired to begin making electronic music. As his interests became increasingly focused on music, he quit graduate school to devote more time to it. Moving to Washington, D.C., he taught English at St. Albans School while continuing to focus on his music. During this time, he released several tracks on Wolf + Lamb Records under the name Sergio Giorgini, which he later referred to as "very sporadic, rudimentary things."

Myers and Simon met in May 2008 at the birthday party of a mutual friend in the D.C. neighborhood of Adams Morgan. By this time, Simon was living in D.C., still pursuing his interest in electronic music while working his day job. About eight months after meeting, the duo began making music together in Simon's studio. Within two months, they produced the tracks "Full Grown Man" and "What I've Lost", which were released on the What I've Lost EP in November 2009 to favorable reviews. What I've Lost was their first release under the name Benoit & Sergio. Further successful releases followed in the 2009–10 school year.

In the summer of 2010, Myers quit his teaching job at St. Albans and moved to Berlin to work on music full-time. His decision was partly influenced by his increasing discomfort with leading a double life as a high school teacher by day and electronic music artist by night. Another factor in Myers's decision was his father's cancer diagnosis, which prompted him to examine his own life. "I thought that if I was still doing the same job in 30 years, I could be where my dad is," he recalled, "and I'd always have this what-if feeling."

While Simon initially stayed in D.C., the two continued to collaborate on their music, preferring to meet up to work together in person. In 2011, the duo became well-established in the electronic music world following the January release of the hit track "Walk & Talk", which Myers described as "sort of a zeitgeist song." They also received playtime on BBC Radio 1 as part of Seth Troxler’s mix on the show Essential Mix. Their success was recognized at the end of the year when they were named the iTunes Breakthrough Electronic Artists of the Year and one of Resident Advisor's Top 10 Live Acts of 2011. The duo continue to enjoy success in the electronic music scene.

== Style and influences ==
Benoit & Sergio's music is often described as melancholy and intelligent. The duo have described their own sound as "dance pop with a slightly melancholy feel to it" (or more poetically as "Cadillac Caribbean dance pop under an autumnal sky" and "an alloy of copper and silk"). They have been noted for staying outside the mainstream of electronic music, maintaining an emphasis on lyrics and vocals and a pop sensibility. Benoit & Sergio generally do not consider themselves to be DJs, preferring to play live shows of mostly their own music.

Benoit & Sergio cite a wide variety of influences from electronic artists such as Isolée, Thomas Melchior, and Ricardo Villalobos to rock musicians, including Talking Heads, Pavement, Roxy Music, and Paul Simon. The duo have described differences in their individual influences despite their shared musical taste, with Benoit being more influenced by disco and Sergio being more influenced by rock. These influences are unusual for electronic artists, and Sergio has described them as contributing to the difference between the duo's sound and mainstream electronic music.

== Releases ==
- What I've Lost EP (2009)
- Midnight People (2010)
- Let Me Count The Ways (2011)
- Principles / Everybody (2011)
- Where The Freaks Have No Name EP (2011)
- Boy Trouble (2011)
- Covers EP (with Slow Hands) (2011)
- New Ships EP (2012)
- Bridge So Far EP (2013)
- Reverse Skydiving Remix (2013)
- Adjustments EP (2013)
- Your Darkness EP (2014)
- That's The Party Talking EP (2014)
- House With 500 Rooms (2015)
- Old Streets (2015)

== Awards and accolades ==
- iTunes Breakthrough Electronic Artists of the Year (2011)
- Resident Advisor Top 10 Live acts (2011, 2012)
- Vibe Magazine's Top Duos (2013)
- GQ Magazine's top American electronic acts (2014)
