= Bloc Festival =

Electronic music festival in England

- Genre: Electronic dance music, electro, hip hop, IDM, techno, house music, reggae, drum and bass and dubstep
- Location: England
- Years active: 2006-2016
- Website: Bloc website

Bloc Festival was an electronic music festival in England which began in 2006. It was devoted to electronic music of all genres including electro, hip hop, IDM, techno, house music, reggae, drum and bass and dubstep, and incorporated both DJ sets and live shows. Following the return of the festival in 2015, it was announced that the 2016 edition of the festival would be the last. In 2017, Boiler Room released a documentary film on the history of the festival, entitled Dancing on Carpets.

== History ==
Year	Location	Capacity	Notable artists	Notes
2007	Pontin's Holiday Camp, Hemsby	2200	Autechre, Kool Keith, KutMasta Kurt, Basic Channel, Mary Anne Hobbs, Digital Mystikz, Robert Hood, Clark (musician), Two Lone Swordsmen, Noisia, Aux 88, Congo Natty, Disco D, Vex'd, Luke Slater, Plastician, Black Sun Empire, Tim Exile, Iration Steppas, The Advent, Surgeon (musician), CJ Bolland, Alex Smoke, Mike Dred, DMX Krew, Billy Nasty, Ceephax Acid Crew, Vector Lovers, Andrea Parker (musician), Posthuman (band)	
2008	Pontin's Holiday Camp, Hemsby	2200	Karl Bartos, Amon Tobin, Juan Atkins, Red Snapper (band), Bochum Welt, Ben Sims, Joey Beltram, Dave Clarke (DJ), Monolake, Phuture, Dynamix II, D'Arcangelo, Luke Vibert, The Black Dog (band), Current Value, Mike Banks (musician), A Guy Called Gerald, Radioactive Man (musician), Kevin Martin (British musician), Boxcutter (musician), Cristian Vogel, Legowelt, Skream, Jackmaster, Actress (musician), Rustie, Mr Velcro Fastener, Detroit Grand Pubahs, Billy Nasty	
2009	Butlin's Holiday Resort, Minehead	6400	Aphex Twin, Lee Scratch Perry, Afrika Bambaataa, Carl Craig, Modeselektor, Jamie Lidell, DJ QBert, The Future Sound of London, Busy P, Mad Professor, Green Velvet, Hudson Mohawke, Egyptian Lover, Dynamix II, Metro Area, I-F, 4hero, Kode9, Daniel Bell (musician), TEED, Rusko (musician), Skream & Benga, Digital Mystikz, Plastician, Pinch (dubstep musician), Ed Rush, 2562, Rustie, Martyn (musician), Vex'd, Joker (British musician), Beardyman, Global Goon, Radioactive Man (musician), Billy Nasty, Richard Devine, 2 Bad Mice, Rob da Bank, Ulrich Schnauss, Tim Exile	
2010	Butlin's Holiday Resort, Minehead	6400	Autechre, Salt n Pepa, Boy Better Know, Flying Lotus, Juan Atkins, Wiley, Grandmaster Flash, Mixmaster Mike, Joy Orbison, Roots Manuva, Derrick May, Antipop Consortium, Nathan Fake, Skream & Benga, Adam Beyer, Joris Voorn, George FitzGerald (musician), DJ Rush, Planetary Assault Systems, Surgeon (musician), Omar-S, DJ Hype, Raffertie, Distance (musician), DJ Zinc, Geeneus, Katy B, Ms Dynamite, MJ Cole, Scratcha DVA, Congo Natty, Russell Haswell, Kode9, Joker (British musician), Mungo's Hi Fi, dBridge, Breakage (musician), DMX Krew, Radioactive Man (musician), Billy Nasty	
2011	Butlin's Holiday Resort, Minehead	6400	Aphex Twin, Magnetic Man, Moderat, Apparat, Four Tet, Ben Klock, Jamie xx, Seth Troxler, Laurent Garnier, LFO, Floating Points, Claude VonStroke, DJ Funk, Soul Clap, Drop The Lime, Beardyman, Matthew Dear, Dopplereffekt, Oscar Mulero, A Guy Called Gerald, SBTRKT, Toddla T, Lone (musician), B12 (band), Kevin Martin (British musician), Legowelt, Mala (musician), Siriusmo, Loefah, Addison Groove, Daedelus (musician), dOP (band), Silent Servant, Mary Anne Hobbs, Gentleman's Dub Club, Iration Steppas, Carsten Nicolai, Jimmy Edgar, Untold (musician), Venetian Snares, Global Goon, Posthuman (band), Kenny Ken, Jacques Greene	
2012	London Pleasure Gardens, London	30000	Snoop Dogg, Orbital, Richie Hawtin, Nicolas Jaar, Jeff Mills, Ricardo Villalobos, Gary Numan, Flying Lotus, Modeselektor, Four Tet, Ricardo Villalobos, Amon Tobin, Apparat (musician), Jamie Jones (DJ), James Blake (musician), Marcel Dettmann, Carl Craig, Shed (musician), Monolake, Hype Williams (band), Squarepusher, Hudson Mohawke, Scuba (musician), Sandwell District, Steve Reich, MF Doom, Surgeon (musician), Ellen Allien, Dusky, Actress (musician), Clark (musician), Joy Orbison, Jackmaster, Martyn (musician), Raster-Noton, Joker (British musician), Jacques Greene, Night Slugs, Digital Mystikz, Addison Groove, Loefah, Oneman, Redinho, Cooly G, Will Saul, Midland (DJ), Nathan Fake, Ray Keith, Billy Nasty, Radioactive Man (musician), Ceephax Acid Crew, Pinch (dubstep musician), Scratcha DVA, Terror Danjah	On Friday 6 July 2012, organisers took the decision to cancel and evacuate the festival during its first night due to 'crowd safety concerns'.
2013	–	–	–	Festival was not conducted.
2014	–	–	–	Festival was not conducted.
2015	Butlin's Holiday Resort, Minehead	6400	Jon Hopkins, Jeff Mills, Autechre, Hudson Mohawke, Modeselektor, ESG & DJ Pierre, Ben Klock b2b Marcel Dettmann, Moodymann, Carl Craig, Ben UFO, Ben Sims, DVS1, Egyptian Lover, DJ Funk, Clark (musician), Cut Hands, Robert Hood, Dean Blunt, Helena Hauff, Rødhåd, Omar-S, Joy Orbison, Jackmaster, Karenn, Midland (DJ), Paula Temple, Dillinja, Function (musician), Pangaea (musician), Scuba (musician), Raime, Pearson Sound, DJ Randall, DMX Krew, Moritz von Oswald, Radioactive Man (musician), Billy Nasty, Richard Devine, Source Direct, Doc Scott	
2016	Butlin's Holiday Resort, Minehead	7000	Thom Yorke, Floating Points, Nina Kraviz, Ben Klock, Andrew Weatherall, Four Tet, Jeff Mills, Rødhåd, Omar-S, Bicep, Holly Herndon, Evian Christ, Optimo, Jimmy Edgar, Motor City Drum Ensemble, Daniel Avery (musician), Fatima Yamaha, Marcus Intalex, Midland (DJ), Tama Sumo, Regis (musician), Demdike Stare, Goldie, Optimo, Altern-8, dBridge, Shanti Celeste, Surgeon (musician), Blawan, Speedy J, DJ Bone, Om Unit, Lone (musician), Andrea Parker (musician), Dom & Roland, Billy Nasty, Ceephax Acid Crew, Posthuman (band), Steve Davis	

== See also ==
- List of electronic music festivals
