= Lovefest =

Music festival in Serbia

- Genre: Techno, Electronic dance music, House music
- Dates: Second and third weekend in August.
- Locations: Vrnjačka Banja, Serbia
- Coordinates: 43.6137917°N 20.8910744°E
- Years active: 2007–present
- Founders: Marko Vukomanović
- Attendance: 50,000 (2021)
- Website: lovefest.rs

Lovefest is a summer music festival which is held every first weekend in August in Vrnjačka Banja, Serbia.

The festival program is held on five different stages, with the main featuring pyrotechnics.

== History ==
The festival was founded in 2007 as the electronic music festival, and was ever since organized by group of local youth. Over the last few years, festival had many globally popular performers, including Maceo Plex, Loco Dice, Green Velvet and others.

In 2017, Lovefest attracted 100,000 visitors. For 2017, it was nominated for the "Best Medium-Sized Festival" by European Festivals Awards (EFA).

In 2018, Lovefest won the award for The best Regional Festival of the year, by the Ambassador.hr

== Stages ==
There are five more stages:

Ultra Energy Stage - the second most popular stage after the Fire Stage. Surrounded by trees, famous for house and afro house tunes, and also by special after-hours because Energy Stage is the only stage that works until 9 AM.

Raw Stage - a stage reserved for hard techno DJs. It was introduced in 2024.

99 Stage - the smallest stage in the world, a tent with the capacity of 99 people only. Recognizable by clubbing atmosphere.

H2O Stage - a stage with a pool. Famous for daily parties and creative water activations.

Rizla Chill - a stage featuring a "chill zone", reserved for genres such as hip-hop, house, drum'n'bass etc.

== Festival by year ==
Year	Dates	Headliners	Notable artists
2026	7–8 & 14–15 August	Anfisa Letyago · ARTBAT · Jamie Jones · Joseph Capriati · Loco Dice · Louie Vega · Mark Broom · Nina Kraviz · Octave One · Pan-Pot · Partiboi69 · Richie Hawtin	Leon Vynehall, Tama Sumo
2025	7–9 August	Anfisa Letyago · Chris Stussy · DVS1 · Folamour · Green Velvet · Lil Louis · Luke Slater · Rebekah	Satoshi Tomiie
2024	8–10 August	Adam Beyer · Chris Stussy · Danilo Plessow (M.C.D.E.) · Honey Dijon (cancelled) · Jamie Jones · Laurent Garnier · Len Faki (cancelled) · Pan-Pot · Ron Trent (cancelled)	N/A
2023	3–5 August	Adam Beyer · Charlotte de Witte · Chris Liebing · Louie Vega · Marco Carola · Mathame · Pan-Pot · Dennis Cruz b2b Seth Troxler b2b William Djoko	Eelke Kleijn
2022	4–6 August	Danny Tenaglia · DVS1 · Folamour · Jamie Jones · Joe Claussell · Joseph Capriati · Kolektiv Turmstrasse · Kölsch · The Martinez Brothers b2b Marco Carola	Archie Hamilton
2021	5–7 August	Anfisa Letyago · Jamie Jones · Joseph Capriati b2b Seth Troxler · Loco Dice · Patrick Topping (cancelled)	Tama Sumo, Timmy Regisford, Buč Kesidi, Kolja, Senidah, Who See
2020 (cancelled)	6–8 August (postponed) 3–5 September (cancelled)	Jamie Jones · Loco Dice · Patrick Topping · Seth Troxler	Tama Sumo
2019	1–3 August	Guy Gerber · Jamie Jones · Joe Claussell · Joris Voorn · Joseph Capriati · Marco Carola b2b The Martinez Brothers · Richie Hawtin · Seth Troxler	K-HAND, Kuniyuki Takahashi
2018	2–5 August	Blawan · Davide Squillace · Derrick May · Dubfire · George FitzGerald · Jackmaster · Jamie Jones · Kenny Larkin · Len Faki · Loco Dice · Marcel Dettmann · Matrixxman · Nicole Moudaber · Optimo · Pan-Pot · Seth Troxler · Stephan Bodzin · Sven Väth · Tama Sumo · Valentino Kanzyani	N/A
2017	3–5 August	Loco Dice · Luciano · Maceo Plex · Carl Craig · Chris Liebing · Marcel Dettmann · DVS1	Valentino Kanzyani, Joe Claussell, Peggy Gou, Goblini, Del Arno Band, Obojeni Program, Hornsman Coyote, KBO!, Vatra, Lira Vega
2016	5–7 August	Sven Väth · Ben Klock · Pan-Pot · Ellen Allien	Rambo Amadeus, Partibrejkers, Ritam Nereda, Edo Maajka, Marčelo, Disciplin A Kitschme, Bjesovi, E-Play
2015	7–9 August	Fedde Le Grand · Dubfire · James Zabiela · Booka Shade	Âme, Juan Atkins, Wankelmut, Blake Baxter, Laibach, Hladno Pivo, Goblini, Eyesburn, Marčelo, Who See, Zaa, Atheist Rap
2014	7–9 August	Jeff Mills · Eric Prydz (cancelled) · Mark Knight · James Zabiela · Robert Hood · Kenny Larkin · Tiefschwarz · Tama Sumo	Bad Copy, Partibrejkers, Let 3, Rambo Amadeus, Who See, Ritam Nereda, S.A.R.S.
2013	1–3 August	Dubioza Kolektiv · Carl Craig · Kevin Saunderson	Zaa
2012	3–5 August	James Zabiela · Darkwood Dub · S.A.R.S.	N/A
2011	5–7 August	Gramophonedzie · Silicone Soul · Darko Rundek & Cargo Trio	N/A
2010	5–7 August	Sonny Fodera	N/A
2009	17–18 July	Martijn ten Velden	Gramophonedzie
2008	18–19 July	N/A	Gramophonedzie
2007	14–15 July	Marshall Jefferson	Gramophonedzie

== Gallery ==
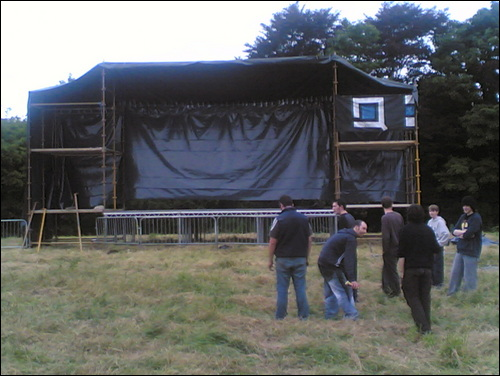
Lovefest in July 2005

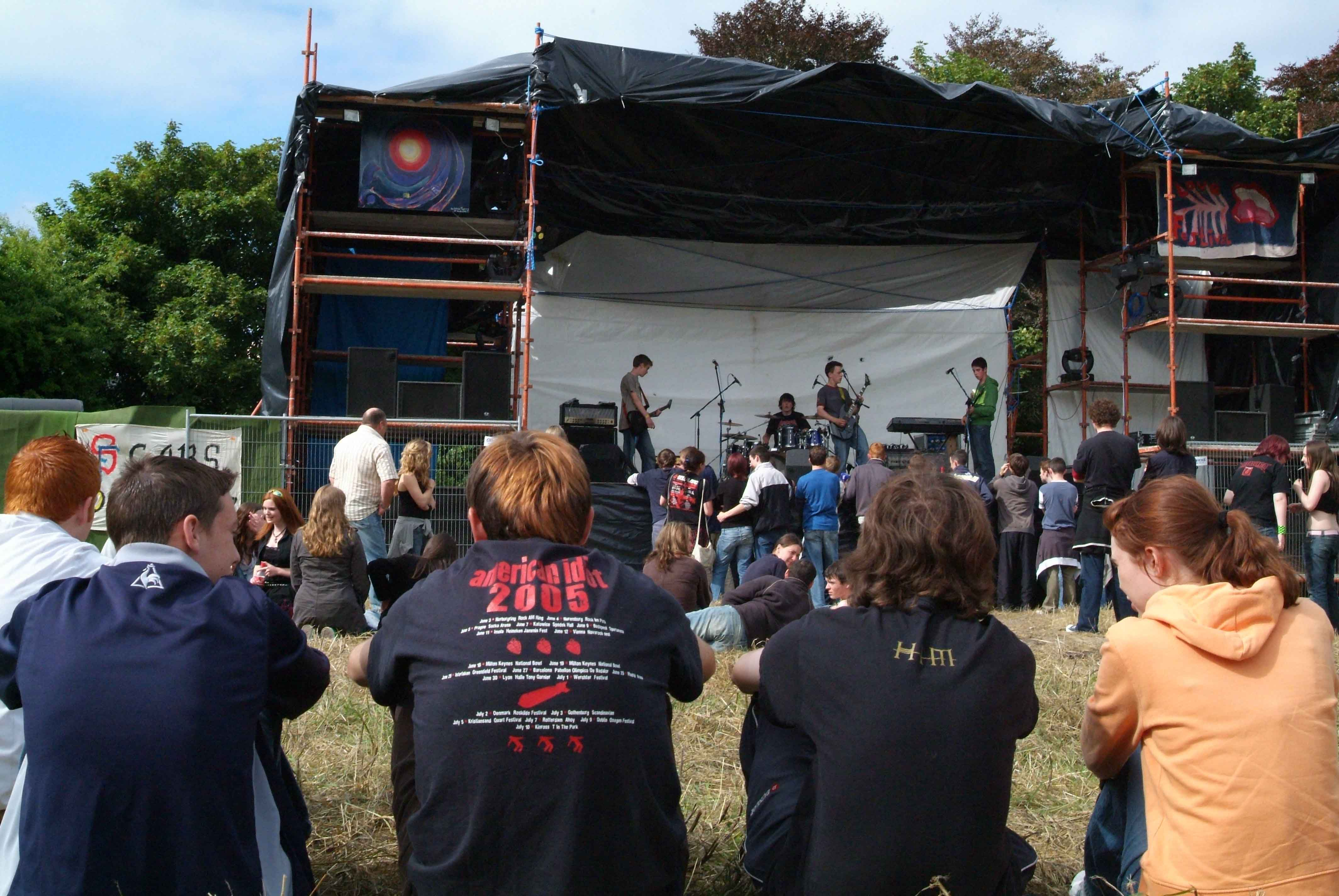
Lovefest in August 2006
