= Blitz Club =

Nightclub in Munich, Germany

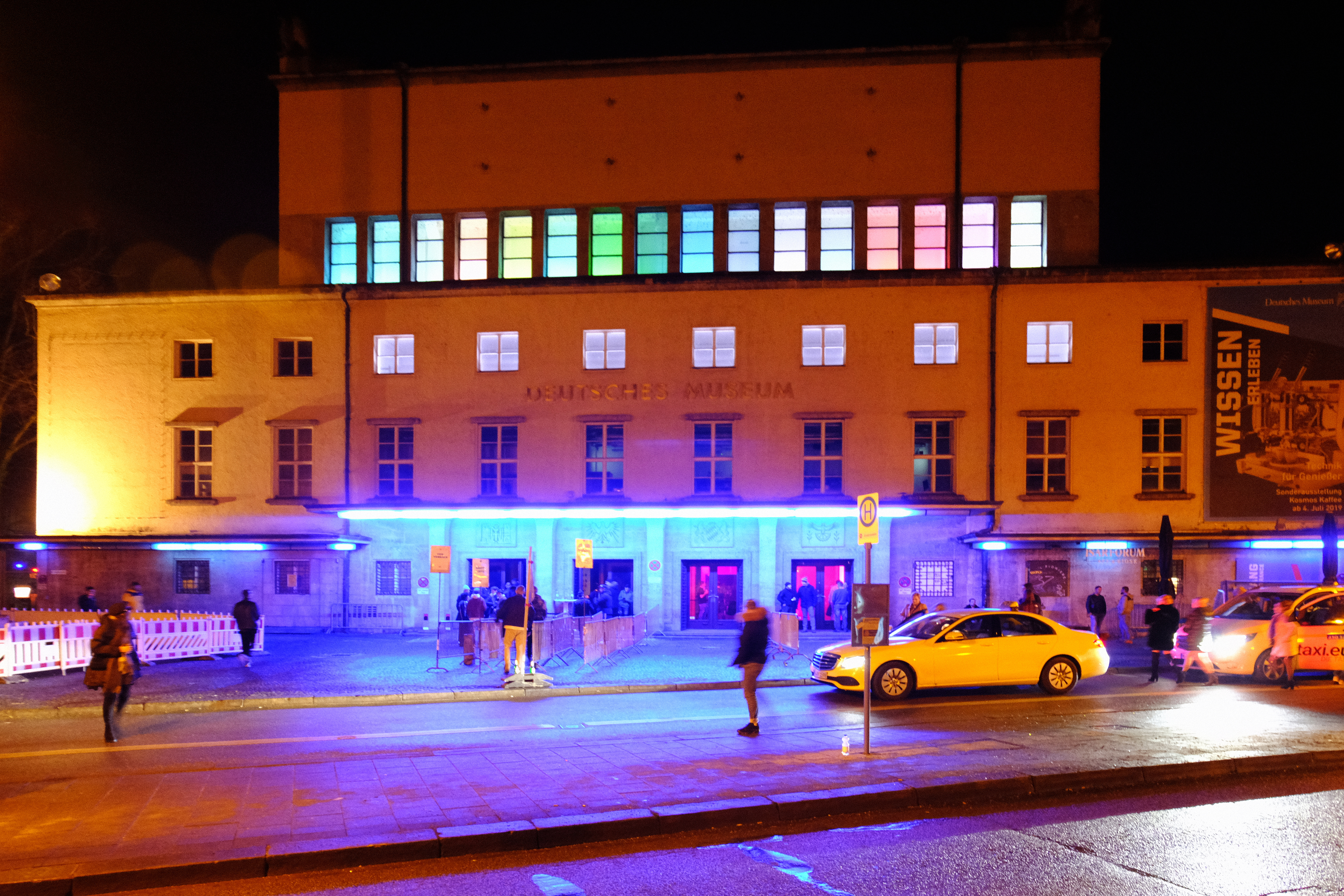
- Blitz Club (2020)
- Interactive map of Blitz Club
- Address: Museumsinsel 1
- Location: Ludwigsvorstadt-Isarvorstadt, Munich, Germany
- Coordinates: 48°7′53″N 11°35′8.2″E
- Type: Nightclub
- Event: Techno

Construction
- Built: 1935
- Opened: 22 April 2017

Website
- Blitz Club

Blitz Club is a techno nightclub in the Munich district of Ludwigsvorstadt-Isarvorstadt.

== History and description ==
The club is located in the former congress hall of the Deutsches Museum, completed in 1935 at the location of Munich's Museumsinsel 1 ("museum island".) The building housed Munich's largest concert hall and a planetarium until 1985, after which it became an IMAX cinema. The congress hall then stood empty for seven years, until the club's operators applied for permission to transform it into a club in 2016. The resulting conversion work required meticulous planning and took several months to complete. This was due to the numerous structural challenges posed by the building being located on a river island. The club eventually opened on 22 April 2022. The nightclub offers two separate dance floors, two bars, several chill-out areas and a smoking room. In total, the club can accommodate up to 800 guests. Blitz Club also hosts an independently-run vegetarian restaurant.

=== Sound and club architecture ===
The sound architecture is the main feature of the club, and has been discussed repeatedly by music magazines and architecture journals. Unlike former Munich techno clubs like Ultraschall, KW – Das Heizkraftwerk or MMA Club, the Blitz Club is not located in a former industrial setting, but was built into the congress hall according to a room-in-room concept in order to offer the best possible sound experience in accordance with the guiding principle form follows function. The rooms were optimized for the acoustic experience together with sound engineers, architects and acousticians. In order to achieve optimal room acoustics, there are hardly any right angles in the club, but specially shaped panels made of beech wood and perforated sheet that were developed according to the specifications of an acoustician. In order to gently scatter the sound waves, a seemingly chaotic honeycomb structure, which was modelled after the swarm behaviour of fish, birds and insects and calculated by a specially developed computer algorithm in a week, is milled into the surfaces of these wall panels. The club uses a custom-made PA system by VOID, which is arranged as a four-point system, so that there is a PA tower in each corner around the dance floor, as well as 360-degree tweeters hanging from the ceiling named "Blitz horn", that were specially designed for the club, and allow the DJ to create three-dimensional sound effects.

Instead of concentrating the attention on the DJ and placing them on a raised stage, the main floor and the sound system were designed to set the focus on the dance floor and the dancers. All in all, the puristic club design is optimized for the sound and dance experience, while oversized branding is avoided. The visual appearance of the club was designed by British musician Trevor Jackson.

=== DJs, music and scene ===
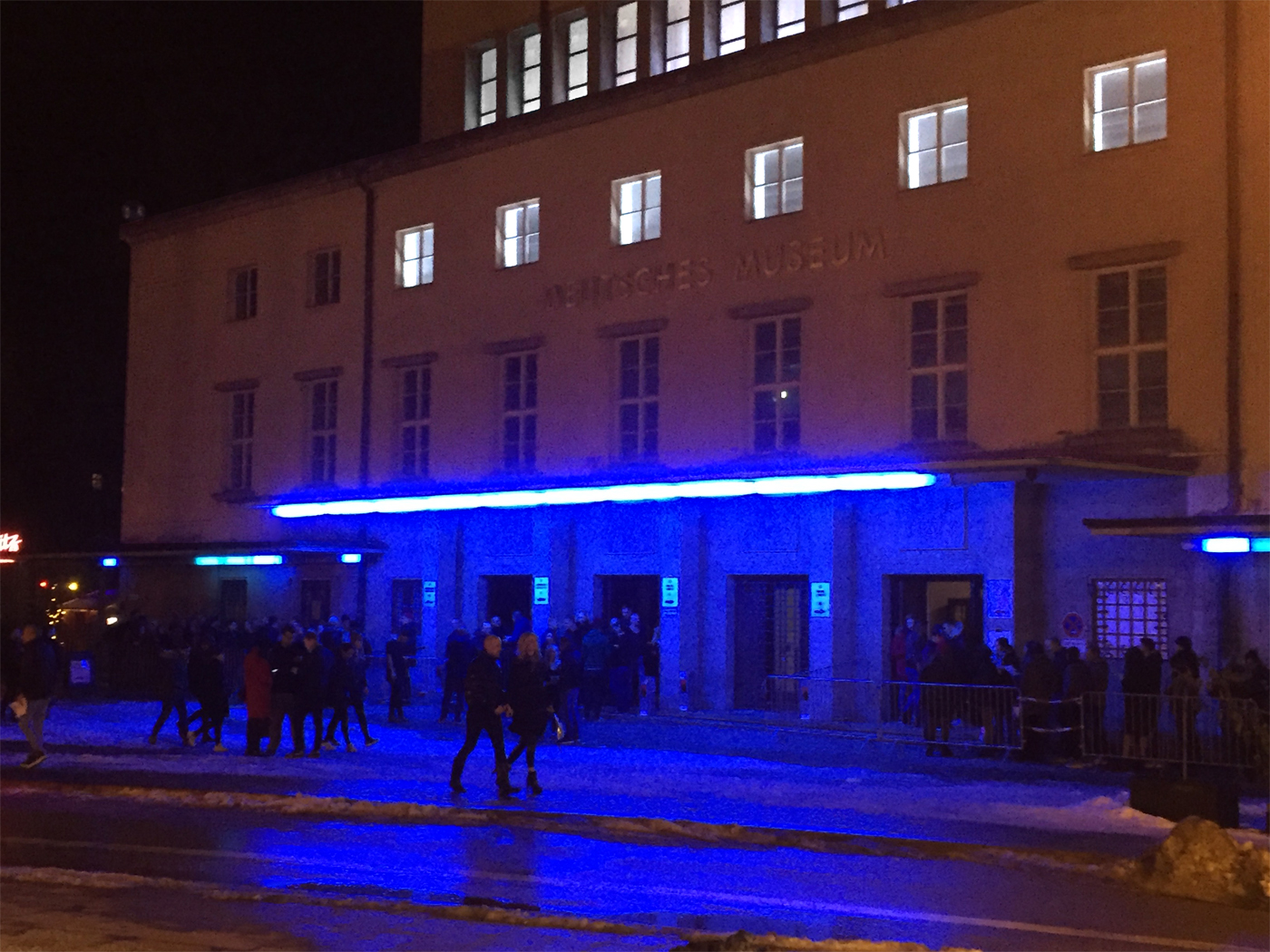
Blitz Club in 2019

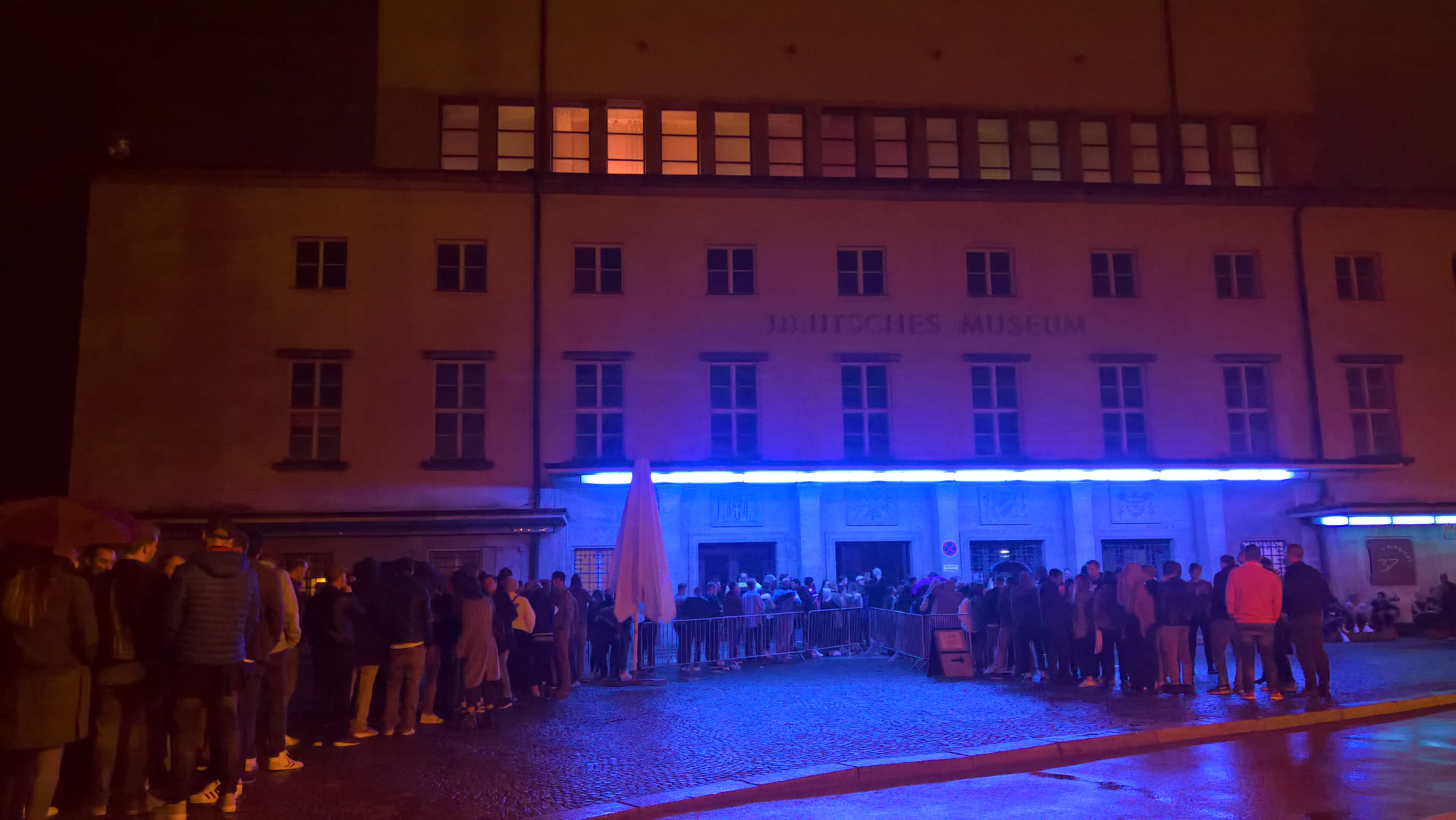
Waiting line in front of the Blitz Club (2018)

The operators of the club consist of former crew members of the clubs Bob Beaman, Charlie, Registratur, King, and Kong Club. Head of the musical program is DJ David Muallem; further resident DJs are the Zenker Brothers, Skee Mask, Stenny, Sascha Sibler, Julietta, Glaskin, and La Staab. Blitz Club has featured appearances by DJs and live acts such as Jeff Mills, Richie Hawtin, Carl Craig, Ben Sims, Seth Troxler, I-F, Miss Kittin, Surgeon, Luke Slater, Laurent Garnier, Nina Kraviz, DJ Hell, Sven Väth, Chris Liebing, Monika Kruse, Ellen Allien, Boys Noize, Marcel Dettmann, Ben Klock, Len Faki, Steve Bug, Modeselektor, Michael Mayer, Roman Flügel, and Âme. The Blitz Club was also a venue for the Germany-wide Telekom Electronic Beats Clubnight series. The club also offers a series of events for the gay fetish scene called Cruise.

=== Entry criteria ===
The club has a strict ban on photography and filming to ensure that guests can concentrate fully on dancing. According to the operators, however, the club also wants to be a place of inclusion without a strict door policy. Since the club's curfew was lifted in July 2017, it is now allowed to remain open until the morning hours.

=== Fire brigade and police operations on the opening day ===
The club's opening event on 22 April 2017 made headlines throughout Germany. In the weeks leading up to the opening event, extensive media coverage had generated significant hype for the opening night and resulted in large crowds turning up at Museumsinsel. Instead of the permitted maximum of 800 guests, the club was quickly overcrowded with 1,500 people. The situation escalated as crowds began to spill onto access roads, emergency exits, escape routes and nearby tram tracks. This resulted in a major fire brigade and police intervention to defuse the situation. Police and fire services blocked a nearby major arterial road, cleared the venue's front terrace and sent hundreds of people home. Numerous disappointed guests later criticized the event's poor planning and management.

=== Closure of the venue at Deutsches Museum ===
In February 2026, it was announced that the Blitz Club would close its venue at the Deutsches Museum later that year. While Deutsches Museum stated that the club's operators decided not to extend the lease due to upcoming renovation works at the museum, the operators, however, stated that they had not been offered a long-term lease extension. The operators also stated that the closure of the Deutsches Museum venue would not mark the end of the club and that they were actively working on securing a successor location. At the end of July 2026, the club will bid farewell to its current venue with a four-day closing party.

== Blitz Restaurant ==
In addition to being a techno club, Blitz also hosts a vegetarian Mexican & Central American restaurant on the same site, which is run separately and independently by Sandra Forster, a prominent name in the Munich gastronomy scene. It has received significant attention from newspapers and gastronomy magazines for its outstanding menu and unique interior design. Its outdoor terrace hosts a beer garden on the Isar's riverbank. In contrast to the club, the restaurant does not operate a photo ban.

== Recognition ==
Blitz Club is regularly featured in national and international daily newspapers and news magazines, specialist magazines for electronic music and club culture, as well as journals for architecture and sound architecture. On Resident Advisor, the nightclub is rated as one of the most popular clubs in Munich (2nd place, as of October 2019). Mixmag Asia ranked the club as one of "10 of the best new clubs on the planet to go raving at" in 2017. In the annual readers' poll of Faze Magazine, the club was voted third best in 2017, and fourth best in 2019. In the annual reader poll of Groove magazine, the club was also voted one of the best in 2017 (4th place).

== Awards ==
- APPLAUS 2023 – Award for Best Live Music Venue

== See also ==
- List of electronic dance music venues
