= Welcome to the Future (festival) =

- Genre: Techno, House
- Dates: end of July
- Location: Netherlands
- Years active: 2007 - present
- Website: welcometothefuture.nl

Welcome to the Future is a music festival held annually in the Netherlands, near Amsterdam. It was launched in 2007 in the nature reserve Het Twiske near Amsterdam. In 2015, the first indoor day edition was launched in the Warehouse Elementenstraat. The final edition at the Twiske area occurred in 2022.

== Awards ==
Since 2012 the festival has been rewarded with A Greener Festival award, and since 2014 with their highest rating.

== Line up ==
| Year | Date | Headliners |
|---|---|---|
| 2018 | Saturday, 21 July 2018 | Dax J, Ø [Phase], Honey Dijon, Steve Rachmad, 2000 And One, Charlotte De Witte |
| 2017 | Saturday, 22 July 2017 | Chris Liebing, Dave Clarke, Seth Troxler, Loco Dice, Kölsch, De Sluwe Vos, Kerri Chandler |
| 2016 | Saturday, 23 July 2016 | Pan-Pot, Chris Liebing, Len Faki, Paco Osuna, The Martinez Brothers, Andhim, Paul Ritch (live) |
| 2015 | Saturday, 25 July 2015 | Seth Troxler, Pan-Pot, Len Faki, Chris Liebing, DJ Sneak, Hot Since 82, Gabriel Ananda (live), Detroit Swindle |
| 2014 | Saturday, 26 July 2014 | Loco Dice, Ricardo Villalobos, Chris Liebing, Planetary Assault Systems (live), Rødhåd, Groove Armada, Mathew Jonson (live), Kölsch (live) |
| 2013 | Saturday, 27 July 2013 | Ricardo Villalobos, Dubfire, Solomun, Maceo Plex, Joris Voorn, Kevin Saunderson, Nic Fanciulli, Karotte, Robert Hood (live), Kink! (live) |
| 2012 | Saturday, 28 July 2012 | Josh Wink b2b Steve Bug, Carl Craig, Surgeon (live), Dennis Ferrer, 2000 and One b2b Daniel Sanchez, Derrick May, DVS1 |
| 2011 | Saturday, 6 August 2011 | Nina Kraviz, Ben Klock, Joris Voorn b2b Nic Fanciulli, Slam (live), Secret Cinema, Seth Troxler |
| 2010 | Saturday, 7 August 2010 | Marco Carola, Joris Voorn, Chris Liebing, Cari Lekebusch, Paul Ritch, Monika Kruse, Pan-Pot, Paco Osuna |
| 2009 | Saturday, 1 August 2009 | Loco Dice, Ben Sims, Onur Ozer, Guy Gerber, Gregor Tresher, Secret Cinema |
| 2008 | Saturday, 2 August 2008 | Luciano, 2000 and One, Karotte, Mark Houle (live), Matthias Tanzmann, Benny Rodrigues |
| 2007 | Saturday, 4 August 2007 | Paul Kalkbrenner, Chris Liebing, Derrick May, Mathew Jonson, Karotte, Speedy J, Technasia (live), Quazar (live) |
