= Claussell =

Claussell is a surname. Notable people with the surname include:

- Joe Claussell (born 1966), American record producer and DJ
- José Claussell, American percussionist

== See also ==
- Clausell, another surname
- Clausells, another surname
