= Berg am Laim =

Borough of Munich, Germany

Coordinates: 48°07′20″N 11°37′40″E

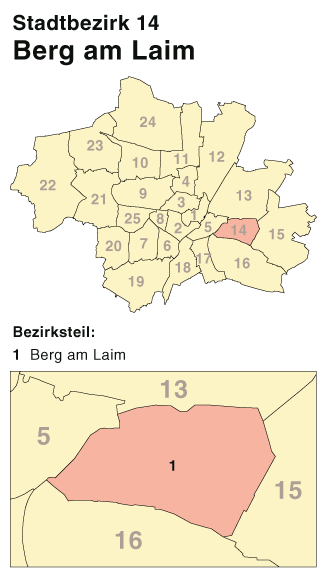

Berg am Laim (German pronunciation: [ˈbɛʁk ʔam ˈlaɪm]; Central Bavarian: Berg am Loam) is a southeastern borough of Munich, Bavaria, Germany.

Berg am Laim is adjacent to Munich East station (München Ostbahnhof).

== Notable landmarks ==
- Das Kartoffelmuseum
- Kultfabrik
- Leuchtenbergring
- Technisches Rathaus
- U-Bahnhof Innsbrucker Ring
- U-Bahnhof Josephsburg
- U-Bahnhof Kreillerstraße
- U-Bahnhof Michaelibad
- Ultraschall
- Werksviertel

== History of the Werksviertel ==
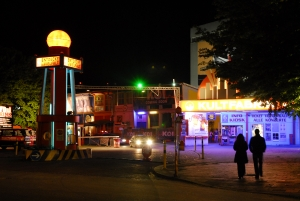
Entrance to the Kultfabrik

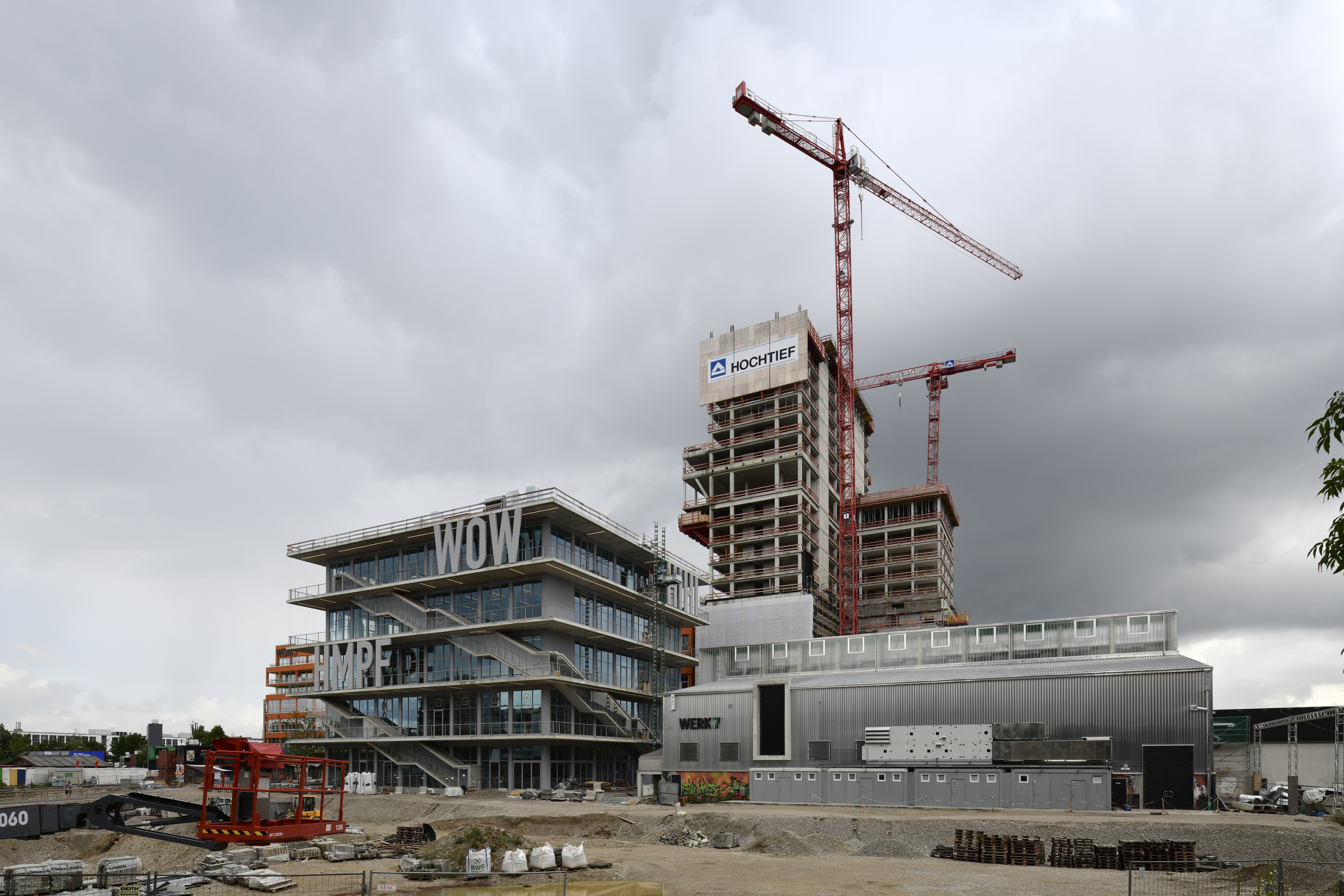
Construction of the Werksviertel Werk 3 and Werk 5 in 2019

Much if what is today known as the Werksviertel was the production site of Pfanni potato products. Pfanni exported its products and is remembered for the 1969 slogan "Good things from Munich - good things from Pfanni". Since 1996 Berg am Laim was for almost two decades a center of Munich's nightlife due to the Kunstpark Ost and its successor Kultfabrik. The Werksviertel is a former industrial complex that was converted to a large party area near München Ostbahnhof. The internationally known nightlife district hosted more than 30 clubs and was especially popular among younger people and residents of the metropolitan area surrounding Munich. Famous nightclubs within the Kunstpark Ost were for example the techno clubs Ultraschall, KW – Das Heizkraftwerk and Natraj Temple as well as Babylon which addressed younger party-goers. Beside the nightlife venues, the area also hosted many ateliers and craft enterprises.

Additionally, the smaller neighboring factory site Optimolwerke was also converted to a party area in 2003, hosting popular venues such as for example Harry Klein, Milchbar, Bullit and Grinsekatze, and in further former factory halls named Georg-Elser-Hallen also concerts and club nights took place from 2000 to 2008. The Kultfabrik was closed at the end of 2015 to convert the area into a residential and office area named Werksviertel. The neighboring Optimolwerke closed in January 2018 and were demolished in the course of the same year.

The converted factory and warehouse buildings were designed to achieve a contemporary look, accommodating bars, restaurants, homes, and offices. A Hi-Sky Ferris wheel was also erected.

== Economy ==
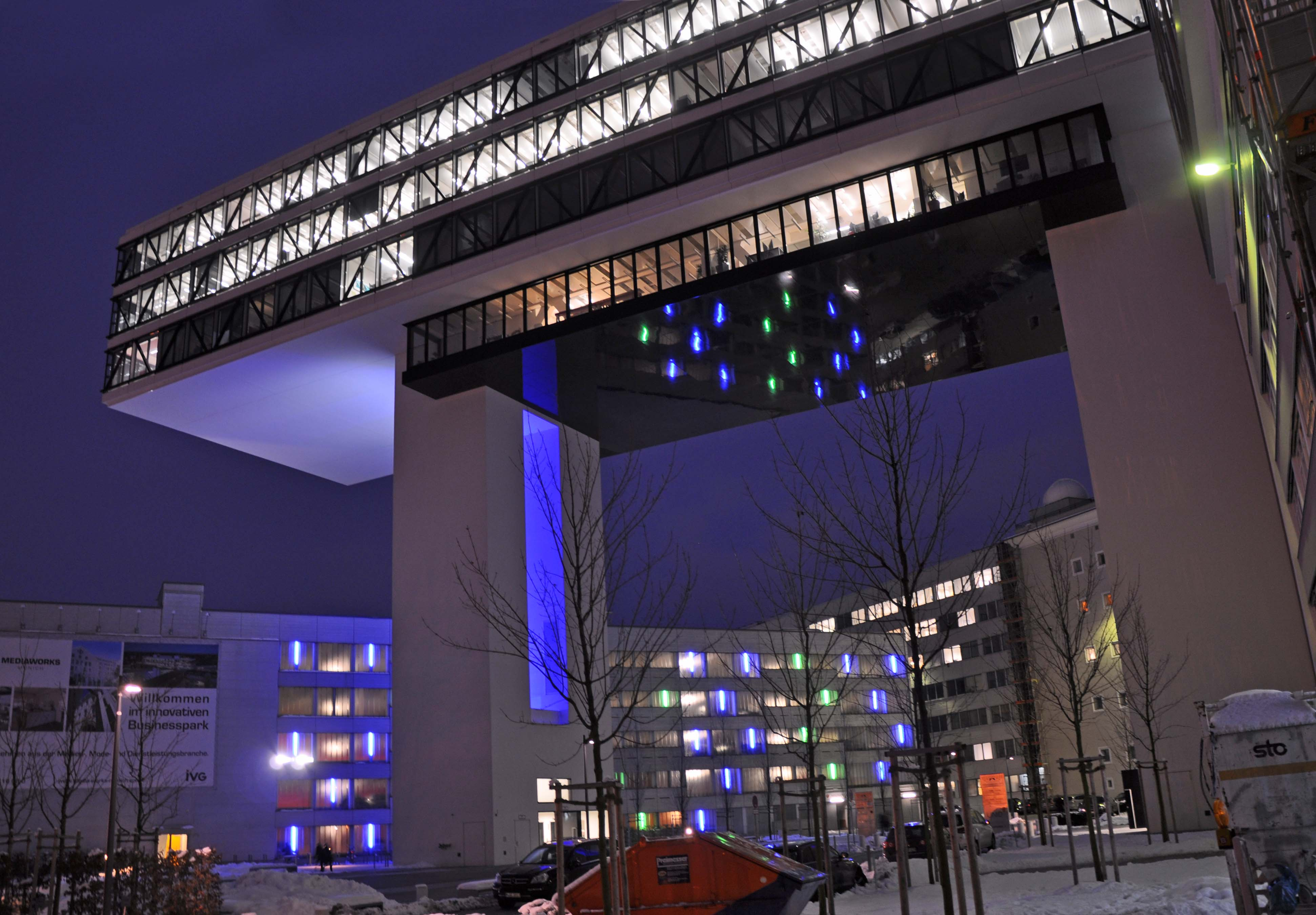
Medienbrücke building which hosts several media companies

A number of media companies have their offices in the new Werksviertel district which was formerly the Kunstpark Ost, as well as within the neighboring business park Media Works. The company Deutsche Telekom operates a large development center in the Ten Towers high rise buildings.
