= Clausell =

Clausell is a surname. It is largely found among African-Americans in Alabama. Notable people with the surname include:

- Blaine Clausell (born 1992), American football player
- Carlos Segura Clausell (born 2003), Spanish soccer player
- Joaquín Clausell (1866–1935), Mexican painter

== See also ==
- Claussell, another surname
- Clausells, another surname
