= MMA Club =

Nightclub in Munich, Germany

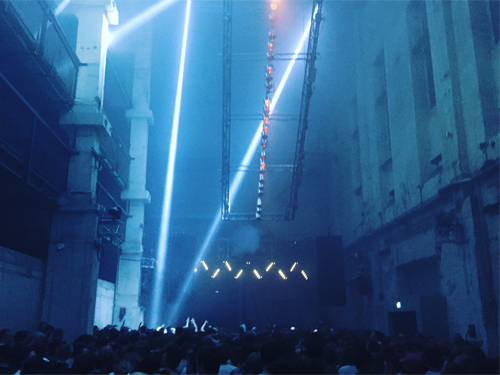
- View of a rave in MMA's main hall
- Interactive map of MMA Club
- Address: Katharina-von-Bora-Str. 8A
- Location: Maxvorstadt, Munich, Germany
- Coordinates: 48°8′37″N 11°34′0″E
- Operator: MMA Kunst- und Kultur UG
- Type: Nightclub
- Event: Techno

Construction
- Built: 1933–1937
- Opened: March 2014
- Renovated: 2013
- Closed: April 2019

Website
- MMA Club

MMA Club (Mixed Munich Arts Club) was a techno nightclub in Munich, Germany, renowned as one of the best in Germany in the 2010s. It was a multifaceted establishment based inside the husk of an old thermal power plant and has hosted underground techno DJs such as Richie Hawtin, Adam Beyer, Len Faki, Ben Klock, Marcel Dettmann, Ben Sims or Terence Fixmer, among many others. The maze-like club also contained a 460-square-meter gallery space frequently utilized for a variety of theatrical, artistic and orchestral performances.

== History and description ==
The club, which is usually only referred to as MMA, was located in a former 1930s power plant in the center of the Bavarian state capital, similar to the former nightclub KW – Das Heizkraftwerk (1996–2003) in the same city and the Berghain in Berlin. The central cogeneration plant at Katharina-von-Bora-Straße was built from 1933 to 1937 as a part of the central of the so-called "Parteiviertel" (party headquarters) of the NSDAP and supplied the former Führerbau, which today houses the University of Music and Performing Arts Munich, by a network of underground passages. After the war, the Bavarian ministry of finance inherited all Nazi Party buildings, selling the central to the Munich City Utilities company. From 2006 on the power plant stood empty, until it was thoroughly gutted in 2013, where more than 300 tons of steel had to be removed solely from the main hall. The opening of the club in March 2014 received wide media attention, and national newspapers and magazines such as Focus, Süddeutsche Zeitung or Bild covered the event. The plant's main boiler hall, described by news magazine Focus as "impressive cathedral of energy", provides the club's main dance floor with 21 meters high walls and measures 460 square meters and 10,000 cubic meters. The venue also housed a smaller "club within the club" in the basement of the car pool hall as an antipole to the main hall, a 10 meters high project room for audiovisual art, as well as several galleries with another 250 square meters floor space, giving the whole club a labyrinth-like impression. The majority of the establishment is located 10 meters underground. Techno artists appreciated the monumental building for its rough, old, and dark atmosphere. Magazines and travel guides often compare the industrial architectural style of the MMA to Berlin's legendary Tresor club or the Berghain.

=== Protests and activism against the closure of MMA 2019 ===
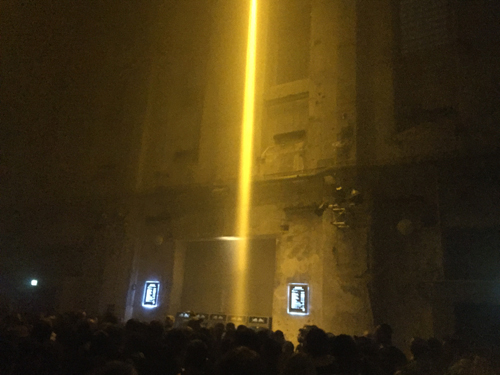
One of the bars at MMA

End of January 2019 numerous news media and magazines reported that the MMA Club would be threatened with closure. It was reported that the Munich City Utilities company would plan to demolish the power plant from the 1930s already in summer 2019 and erect 85 apartments and company-owned dwellings instead. This meant that 50 to 80 employees of MMA as well as a number of exhibiting artists on the compound would be at risk of losing their job or workplace. Several initiatives and media called on the music and cultural scene to resist against the decision. This includes an appeal of the club owners to draw attention to the threat of closure of the club by using the hashtag #SaveMMA. An online petition that was initiated by guests of the MMA and addressed to Munich's city council demanded the preservation of this internationally renowned cultural site. The initiators of the online petition argued that Munich would need this kind of location for the arts and culture scene more than other cities due to the strong gentrification, and demanded that art and culture and new living space should not be played off against each other. Eventually the petition against the closure of MMA was signed by more than 11,000 supporters from 34 countries. The artist community of 30 people that also resided in the old power plant and thus was hit by the closure of their workplace as well organized a protest march against their displacement. Many of the artists left Munich after MMA was closed down because they could not find new studios in the city.

== DJs and music ==
MMA almost exclusively featured internationally known DJs and live acts, such as Richie Hawtin, Adam Beyer, Ben Sims, Anthony Rother, Terence Fixmer, Len Faki, Ben Klock, Marcel Dettmann, Nina Kraviz, Amelie Lens, Maceo Plex, Johannes Heil, Extrawelt, I Hate Models, Charlotte de Witte, Gregor Tresher and Alan Fitzpatrick, among many others. Residents of MMA included Javier Bähr, Svar, Paul and The Hungry Wolf, Essika and Marcella. Because of the similar lineup, it was often labeled as "the Berghain of the south." Club nights there lasted at least until 10 am, but could also last 48 hours at a stretch.

== Concept ==
Mixed Munich Arts was not only a techno club, but in accordance with the given name also intended as a space that brings electronic music and avant-garde art together. The owners described this as follows: "string quartets meet graffiti, photo vernissages meet interactive performances, video artists meet techno DJs. In this spirit, MMA also regularly hosted cultural events beyond the techno nights like theatrical performances, concerts, art exhibitions, graffiti exhibitions and street food markets, or Christmas markets for hip-hop fans.

== Subsidiaries ==
=== Bora Beach ===
Since 2017 MMA also administered a beach bar on Munich's Praterinsel island, where minimal electro was played by live DJs, and adults could enjoy cocktails and vegan food; sand toys were offered for children. The music at this venue oriented itself to the main club, but was more relaxed.

=== Electric Elephant ===
The club also operated the restaurant Electric Elephant at the power plant. The restaurant offered Indian cuisine, was furnished in a minimalist way, and had an open-air lounge area. Previously, MMA had cooperated with an Italian restaurant in the same place.

== Reception ==
MMA and its events were regularly covered by the media and tourist guides. The club was ranked among the best clubs in Germany, as well as among the best clubs in the world. Resident Advisor ranked it as one of Munich's top clubs (third place as of August 2017). The techno club has been described by The Guardian as a "towering techno temple that rivals any in Berlin". At the Munich Nightlife Awards the club was awarded first place in the "music" category and second place in the "booking" category in 2016, and defended this position the following year.

== See also ==
- List of electronic dance music venues
