= Don't Touch That Dial (disambiguation) =

Dont Touch That Dial may refer to:

- "Dont Touch That Dial", a 1990 EP by American electro-drum'n'bass act, Dynamix II
- ""Don't Touch That Dial" (E02S1), an episode of the Disney+ TV series WandaVision
