= Shanti Celeste =

Chilean-British DJ

Shanti Celeste (born 20 October 1988, in Temuco, Chile) (pronounced [ʃanti cɵɭɵstɵ]) is a Chilean DJ, electronic music producer, singer, record label owner, event promoter, radio host and illustrator based in London, having previously been based in Bristol, Cumbria and Berlin. Her music style is associated with house, techno, electro, and ambient.

== Biography ==
Celeste was born in Chile but moved to the United Kingdom when she was 12, as her mother married an English man.

She had her first contact with electronic music at rave parties in the Lake District at the age of 15. By 17, she was taught to mix vinyl by friend, and future fellow Bristol resident; DJ and producer Kowton. After completing high school, Celeste moved to Bristol for an illustration course at the University of the West of England in 2008. In Bristol, she became a resident DJ at student orientated house, disco and techno night Super Ultra Mega at Lab club. Through this she got to know Chris Farrell (DJ), a Bristol based DJ and head of the record label Idle Hands, for whom she started working in a part-time job at the label's eponymous record store in 2011, which was at the time located on Stokes Croft. Celeste went on to co-run another label BRSTL with Farrell, taking over the creative business partnership from Rhythmic Theory. It was on this label that Celeste released her debut Need Your Lovin' (Baby) in 2013.

During her time in Bristol, she also became a resident at club night "Housework" (originally a sister night to Super Ultra Mega), before taking over promoting duties (along with fellow Bristol based DJs Gramrcy, Daisy Moon and Golesworthy (DJ)) with the intention to attract DJs to Bristol from outside the city. Later they would bring the night to Berlin.

Celeste was nominated Best Newcomer DJ in the 2015 edition of the DJ Awards. In 2016, Celeste relocated to Berlin. The following year, she debuted her own label, Peach Discs which she runs with Gramrcy and now runs a label related club night Club Celeste (and previously one named Peach Party) in London and Bristol.

The DJ's tour schedules have included performances at some of the world's most renowned nightclubs, clubbing events and festivals, such as Berlin's techno temple Berghain, Corsica Studios in London, Freerotation, Dutch festival Dekmantel, Bloc Festival, Boomtown (festival), Tresor (club), Glastonbury Festival, Discwoman, Wigflex, Love International Festival, Bestival, DC10 (nightclub), Moogfest, Amsterdam Dance Event and the Bulgarian indie festival Meadows In The Mountains.

In 2022, she remixed Orbital (band)'s 'Are We Here?'

On top of her assignments as DJ, music producer, and event curator, she also runs a monthly radio show at NTS Radio. In December 2018, she produced a mix for BBC Radio 1's lauded Essential Mix series.

== Discography ==
=== Albums ===
- Tangerine (2019)

=== Extended plays ===
- Universal Glow (2014)
- Alma (2017)
- Being (2017)
- Bounce(2023)

=== Singles ===
- "Need Your Lovin' (Baby)" [2013]
- "Days Like This" (2014)
- "Being" (2015)
- "Untitled" (2017)
- "Make Time" (2017)
- "Moons" (2019)
- "Cutie" (2022)
- "Fluffy" (2023)
