= José Claussell =

- Origin: New York

José "Cochise" Claussell is a New York percussionist. He is the brother of DJ and music producer Joe Claussell.

He works often on his better-known DJ brother's Joe Claussell's own releases and remixes, often released on either of his brother's labels; initially Spiritual Life Music and more recently via Sacred Rhythm Music.
