= Gabriel Ananda =

German DJ & producer of techno music

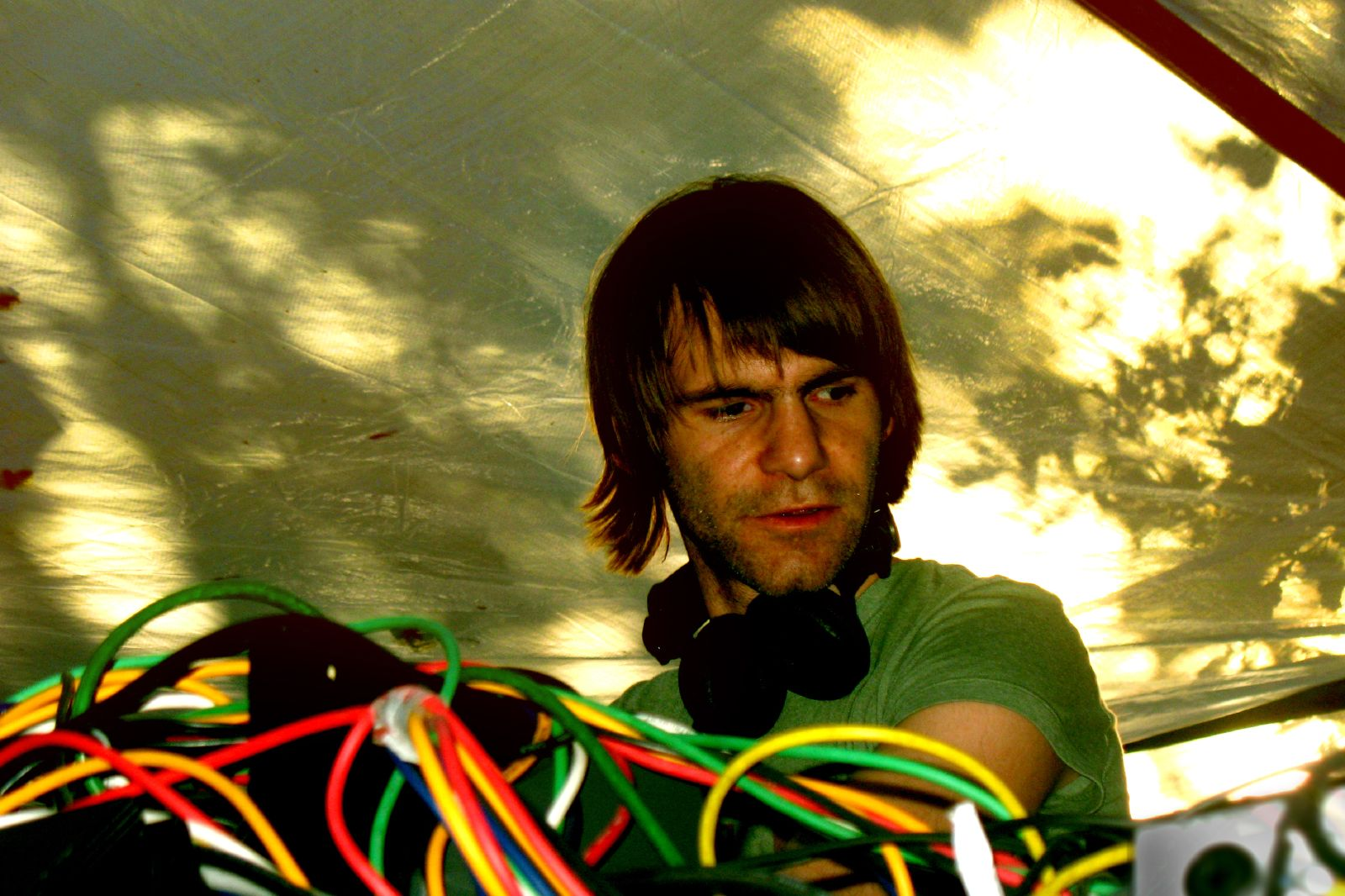
- Gabriel Ananda at "Insel Berlin" club, Berlin, 2006

Background information
- Born: Gabriel Ananda Levermann; August 3, 1977 (age 48); Bad Driburg, Germany
- Genres: Electronica; techno; minimal
- Occupations: Electronic musician, composer, record producer, remixer, DJ, record label owner
- Years active: 1998–present
- Labels: Basmati
- Website: www.gabrielananda.com

Gabriel Ananda (born in Bad Driburg, Germany) is a German DJ and producer of techno music.

== Career ==
Ananda was interested in music at an early age, but it wasn't until 1995 when he experienced a live set by Sven Väth he got interested in electronic music. Ananda made his debut as a producer as half of the duo Da Hairy Belafontes on the label Hörspielmusik, with the three-track EP 'Daylight Comes and We Don't Want to Go Home' in 1998. He went on to release singles on Treibstoff, Trapez, Platzhirsch, and Karmarouge before producing what was for him, a life changing track. His 2004 release of "Süssholz" went to the top of the German DJ charts. It was followed by another hit in 2005 titled 'Ihre persönliche Glücksmelodie', and then 'Doppelwhipper' in 2006.

In 2008, Ananda founded his own record label, Basmati, as a place where he can release his own productions. And by the end of 2011, Basmati celebrated its 9th release, eight of those from Ananda.

In 2015, he played at the Welcome to the Future festival in the Netherlands.

== Discography ==
=== Albums ===
- 2004: Tai Nasha No Karosha (Karmarouge)
- 2007: Bambusbeats (Karmarouge)
- 2009: Remastered Classics On Trapez (Trapez)
- 2011: Selected Techno Works (Basmati)

=== Singles & EPs ===
- 1998: Da Hairy Belafontes: Daylight Comes And We Don't Want To Go Home EP (Hörspielmusik)
- 2000: First Comment EP (utils)
- 2000: For Love (Karmarouge)
- 2001: Wild Cherry EP (Karmarouge)
- 2001: Time To Rise (Shot Records)
- 2001: Headmusic For Bodymotion (Shot Records)
- 2002: Schaukeldrehen (Trapez)
- 2003: Ananda. Rose: Silverwear (Tonsport)
- 2003: Bibi & Gabriel: O La La La (My Best Friend)
- 2003: Highway To Heaven (Trapez)
- 2003: Wegeschwindel (Trapez)
- 2004: Dieheiligendreikönige (Tonsport)
- 2004: Süssholz (Treibstoff)
- 2004: Forckeln EP (Platzhirsch Schallplatten)
- 2004: Limited #2 (Platzhirsch Schallplatten)
- 2004: Atropa Belladonna EP (Karmarouge)
- 2004: Black Coffee EP (Karmarouge)
- 2005: Hans Nieswandt Mit Gabriel Ananda: Ich Vermiss Die Zeit (Bleib) (Ladomat 2000)
- 2005: Vergissmeinnicht (liebe*detail)
- 2005: Childish Dream EP (Karmarouge)
- 2006: Miracel Whop (Platzhirsch Schallplatten)
- 2006: Der Blaumacher (Glückskind Schallplatten)
- 2006: Ananda's Bassmaschinchen (Part 1) (Treibstoff)
- 2006: Ananda's Bassmaschinchen (Part 2) (Treibstoff)
- 2006: Dominik Eulberg & Gabriel Ananda: Harzer Roller (Traum Schallplatten)
- 2006: Während Die Anderen Den Müll Rausbrachten (Karmarouge)
- 2006: Karmarouge Noir Four (Karmarouge Noir)
- 2006: Gabriel Ananda & Cio D' Or - Lauschgoldengel (Treibstoff)
- 2006: Küppers City (Tonsport)
- 2007: Stream Of Consciousness (Karmarouge)
- 2007: Dominik Eulberg & Gabriel Ananda: Kirschplunder & Jasmin Tee Bei Gabriel (Traum Schallplatten)
- 2007: Gabriel Ananda & Tobias Becker - Limitiert #4 (Platzhirsch Schallplatten)
- 2007: Sheli O (Cereal/Killers)
- 2008: Coconut Blues / BabyPunk (Treibstoff)
- 2008: Lila Pause (Traum Schallplatten)
- 2008: Endlich 17 (Platzhirsch Schallplatten)
- 2009: Dominik Eulberg & Gabriel Ananda: Eucalypse Now! (Traum Schallplatten)
- 2009: Bell/Schnee (Basmati)
- 2010: Gabriel Ananda / Daniel Mehlhart / Quazar – GCF / 1.1 Remake (Basmati)
- 2010: Charming & Alarming (Basmati)
- 2010: Kota Sür (Platzhirsch Schallplatten)
- 2011: Live Series Part I (Basmati)
- 2011: Live Series Part II (Basmati)
- 2011: Live Series Part III (Basmati)
- 2011: Fluid (notes)
- 2011: Love Attack (Treibstoff)
- 2012: Drum Variations (100% Pure)
- 2012: Short Story (Basmati)
- 2012: Warm Cologne (Monique Musique)
- 2012: Green (Basmati)
- 2013: Let It In And Let It Out Ep (Suara)
- 2014: Maceo Plex & Gabriel Ananda - Solitary Daze (Ellum Audio)
- 2014: Earthed (Click Records)
- 2014: Aegyptology (Click Records)
