= Ostgut Ton =

German record label

- Founded: 2005; 20 years ago
- Genre: Techno; house
- Country of origin: Germany
- Location: Berlin
- Official website: ostgut.de

Ostgut Ton (also known as Ostgut Tonträger) is a German record label owned by the club Berghain in Berlin. Resident Advisor described it "a dominant force in dance music, beloved for its mix series and dozens of EPs, albums and compilations."

The label's first releases were by Berghain/Panorama Bar residents such as André Galluzzi, Cassy, and Ben Klock.

Amongst the producers that have released for the label are André Galluzzi, Ben Klock, Cassy, Edit-Select, Efdemin, Len Faki, Luke Slater, Marcel Dettmann, Marcel Fengler, Murat Tepeli, My My, Nick Höppner, Paul Brtschitsch, Prosumer, Samuli Kemppi, Shed, Tama Sumo, Tobias Freund, Tim Paris, and Vatican Shadow.

Ostgut Ton closed in December 2021, reopened in May 2025.
