= Tangerine (Shanti Celeste album) =

Studio album by Shanti Celeste
- Released: 15 November 2019
- Length: 46:00
- Label: Peach Discs

Singles from Tangerine
- 1. "Voz" Released: 1 October 2019; 2. "Moons" Released: 30 October 2019

Professional ratings
Aggregate scores
Source	Rating
Metacritic	82/100
Review scores
Source	Rating
Exclaim!	8/10
The Guardian	4/5 stars
The Line of Best Fit	9/10
Pitchfork	7.3/10

Tangerine is the debut studio album by Chilean DJ Shanti Celeste. It was released on 15 November 2019 under Celeste's own label, Peach Discs.

== Critical reception ==
Tangerine was met with universal acclaim reviews from critics. At Metacritic, which assigns a weighted average rating out of 100 to reviews from mainstream publications, this release received an average score of 82, based on 6 reviews.

=== Accolades ===
Publication	Accolade	Rank	Ref.
DJ Mag	Top 50 Albums of 2019	36	
Mixmag	Top 50 Albums of 2019	8	
The Quietus	Top 100 Albums of 2019	66	

== Track listing ==
Tangerine track listing
No.	Title	Length
1.	"Infinitas"	6:47
2.	"Sun Notification"	5:20
3.	"Sesame"	5:58
4.	"May the Day"	3:06
5.	"Natura"	1:32
6.	"Want"	5:38
7.	"Voz (instrumental)"	3:14
8.	"Slow Wave"	3:05
9.	"Aqua Block"	5:28
10.	"Moons"	5:52
