= Electronic Beats =

International music marketing program of Deutsche Telekom

Telekom Electronic Beats (TEB) is an international music marketing program of Deutsche Telekom focusing on electronic music and international club culture. The program was founded in 2000. It comprises a media portfolio and has been organizing events such as concerts, festivals and club nights with mainly electronic music artists throughout Europe.

== Publishing ==
TEB's media portfolio and formats have changed and developed since the start of the program:

“Electronic Beats TV” is one of the longest running video magazines in electronic music. The format started in 2000 with a weekly TV show moderated by Ill-Young Kim and broadcast by VIVA and Viva Zwei, featuring performances from artists such as BT. From 2005, it was published as a quarterly DVD magazine called Slices. The DVDs were available for free through distribution in boutiques, cafés, bars, clubs etc. mainly in Central and Eastern Europe. Since 2015, all content is hosted on YouTube. In February 2018, TEB's YouTube channel was awarded the YouTube Silver Creator Award for more than 100,000 subscribers.

The online magazine .net was launched in 2001. It offers news, single and album reviews, longform articles as well as podcasts, audio and video features on electronic dance music and club culture.

In 2005, the English-language Electronic Beats Magazine started. The quarterly print publication revolved around music, culture and travel subjects. Like Slices, it was available for free through distribution in boutiques, cafés, bars, clubs etc. mainly in Central and Eastern Europe. The final issue was published in late 2015.

Telekom Electronic Beats also appeared as a record label: 2007 saw the release of the first Electronic Beats Compilation in collaboration with Warner Music Austria.

In 2011, Electronic Beats extended its work to Poland, launching a website in Polish and hosting events in the biggest cities throughout the country.

In 2017, TEB created the app “The Lenz” together with Gorillaz.

In 2018 started the German language Electronic Beats Podcast series. It is moderated by hosts Gesine Kühne and Jakob Thoene. Each episode features one or more guests from the field of nightlife, electronic dance music and club culture. So far, DJ Hell, WestBam, Fritz Kalkbrenner, Oliver Koletzki, Michael Michalsky, Perel, Frank Wiedemann, Dimitri Hegemann, Many Ameri, Roosevelt, David August, Gabi Delgado, Heiko Hoffmann, Modeselektor, Michael Rother, HVOB, Apparat, Laurin Schafhausen and Christian Löffler, among others, have appeared on the show.

== Events ==
The Electronic Beats live music events are a series of club nights, concerts and festivals hosted in cities throughout Europe.

The first Electronic Beats Festival took place in 2001 at Cologne's Palladium, featuring live appearances by Mouse on Mars and OP:L Bastards.

In 2002, the second Electronic Beats Festival at Cologne's Palladium featured LTJ Bukem & MC Conrad, Kosheen, Sofa Surfers, Kid Loco and Chicks on Speed.

In 2004, the "Electronic Beats Stereo Deluxe Spring Tour" took place. That same year during Popkomm there are also three event nights featuring Rammstein, Virginia Jetzt!, Phillip Boa, Tiefschwarz and Mocky among others in the former Palace of the Republic. 2raumwohnung, MIA. and Chicks on Speed played at an Electronic Beats Live Special during the Bonner T-Mobile Forum.

In 2005, there were Electronic Beats Festivals with Faithless, Stereo MCs, Zoot Woman, GusGus and The Prodigy in Cologne, Edinburgh, Vienna and Amsterdam. Additionally the Electronic Beats Sundowner Tour takes place in Budapest, Vienna, Berlin, Hamburg, Brighton, Munich, Zagreb and Amsterdam. Moreover, there was “The Night is White/Casa Relax Launch Party” in Ibiza which was held in collaboration with Sony Ericsson.

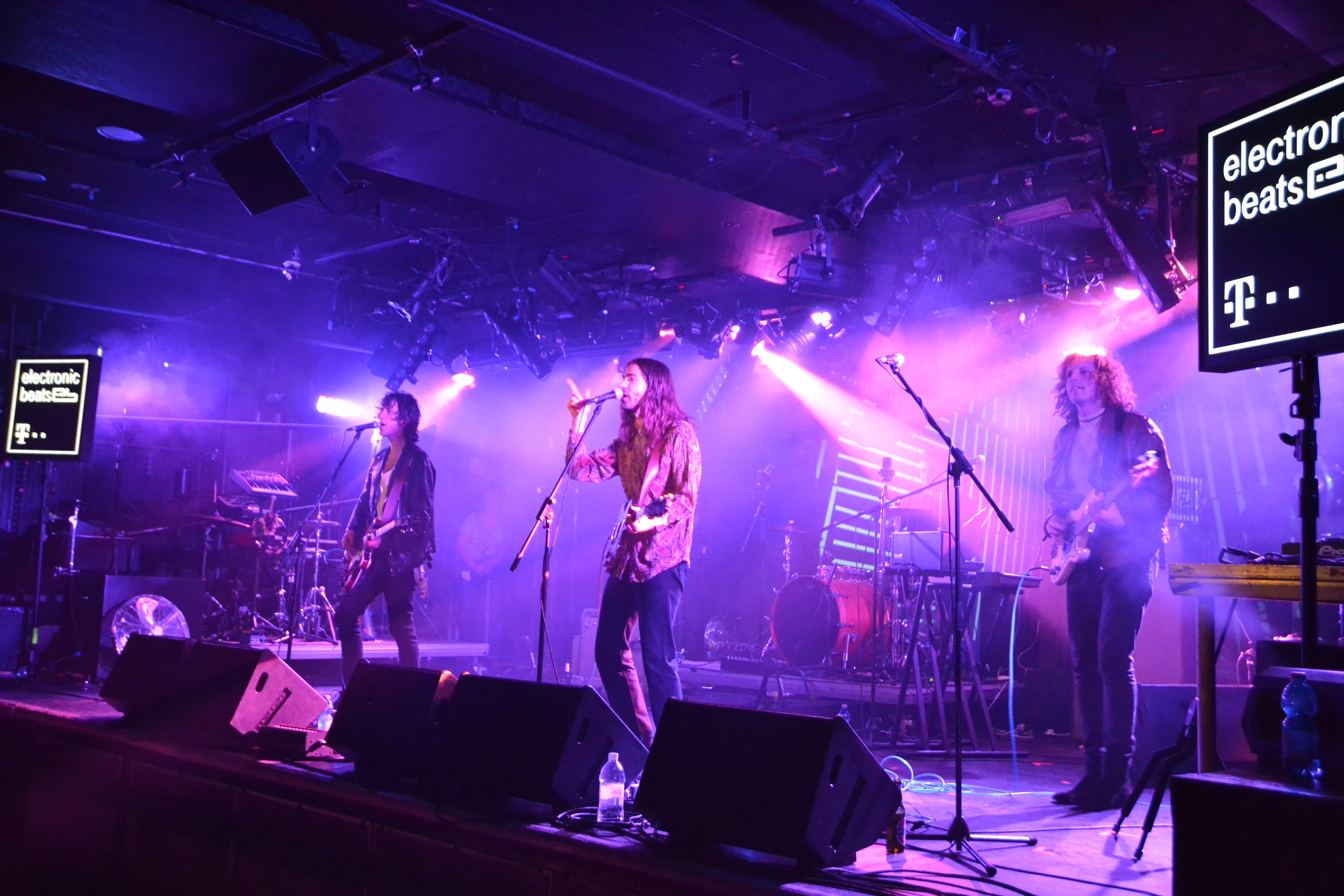
Ten Fé performing at Electronic Beats Festival in Budapest in 2015

2006 saw Electronic Beats Festivals with Nightmares on Wax, Superdiscount, The Prodigy, Deichkind, Carl Graig, Groove Armada, Boy George, DJ Hell, MIA., Zoot Woman in Cologne, Budapest, Bratislava, Prague and Vienna plus a Croatian club tour with Ian Pooley.

2007 saw Electronic Beats Festivals with Soulwax (as 2 Many DJs), Goldie, Kelis and Felix da Housecat in Vienna and Budapest as well as another club tour with Ian Pooley, Howard Donald and Tonka in Croatia.

In 2008, Electronic Beats Festivals were held in Bratislava, Prague, Bonn, Graz, Vienna and Berlin, featuring Underworld, Modeselektor, Robyn, Alter Ego, Who Made Who, The Streets, Róisín Murphy, Booka Shade, The Whitest Boy Alive, Peaches, Hercules and Love Affair, Santigold and Gorillaz Sound System.

In 2009, Electronic Beats Festivals were held in Cologne, Graz and Innsbruck, featuring The Gossip, Phoenix, Fever Ray, Simian Mobile Disco, Modeselektor, Bodi Bill, Filthy Dukes and James Yuill. That same year the first "Electronic Beats Classics Concert" with Donna Summer was held in Berlin. The second episode of the event series presents Yello and their “Virtual Concert” in Berlin, Vienna and Cologne.

In 2010, Electronic Beats Festivals with Hot Chip, Booka Shade, Moderat, Miike Snow, Delphic, The Human League, Little Dragon, Kele, Bon Homme, Nouvelle Vague, The Asteroids Galaxy Tour, Turboweekend and Róisín Murphy were held in Prague, Graz, Cologne, Berlin and Vienna. There was also a “Friends and Family Event” for the tenth anniversary of TEB with Caribou and Barbara Panther in Berlin. An “Electronic Beats Recommends Club Tour” happened that same year, featuring Caribou, Barbara Panther and Mount Kimbie in Munich, Leipzig, Hamburg, Heidelberg, Cologne, Prague, Budapest, Vienna, Frankfurt and Zagreb.

In 2017, four shows with Gorillaz were held in Warsaw, Budapest, Katowice and Cologne.

Since 2017, there's an ongoing TEB Clubnight series in clubs throughout Germany. It features live appearances by artists such as Ata, Mr. G., Inga Mauer, Hodge, FJAAK and many more. Clubs that host TEB Clubnights include Institut fuer Zukunft in Leipzig, PAL in Hamburg, Blitz Club in Munich, White Noise in Stuttgart, Gewölbe in Cologne, Klub Neu in Dresden, Galerie Kurzweil in Darmstadt, Studio Club in Essen, Oma Doris in Dortmund among others.

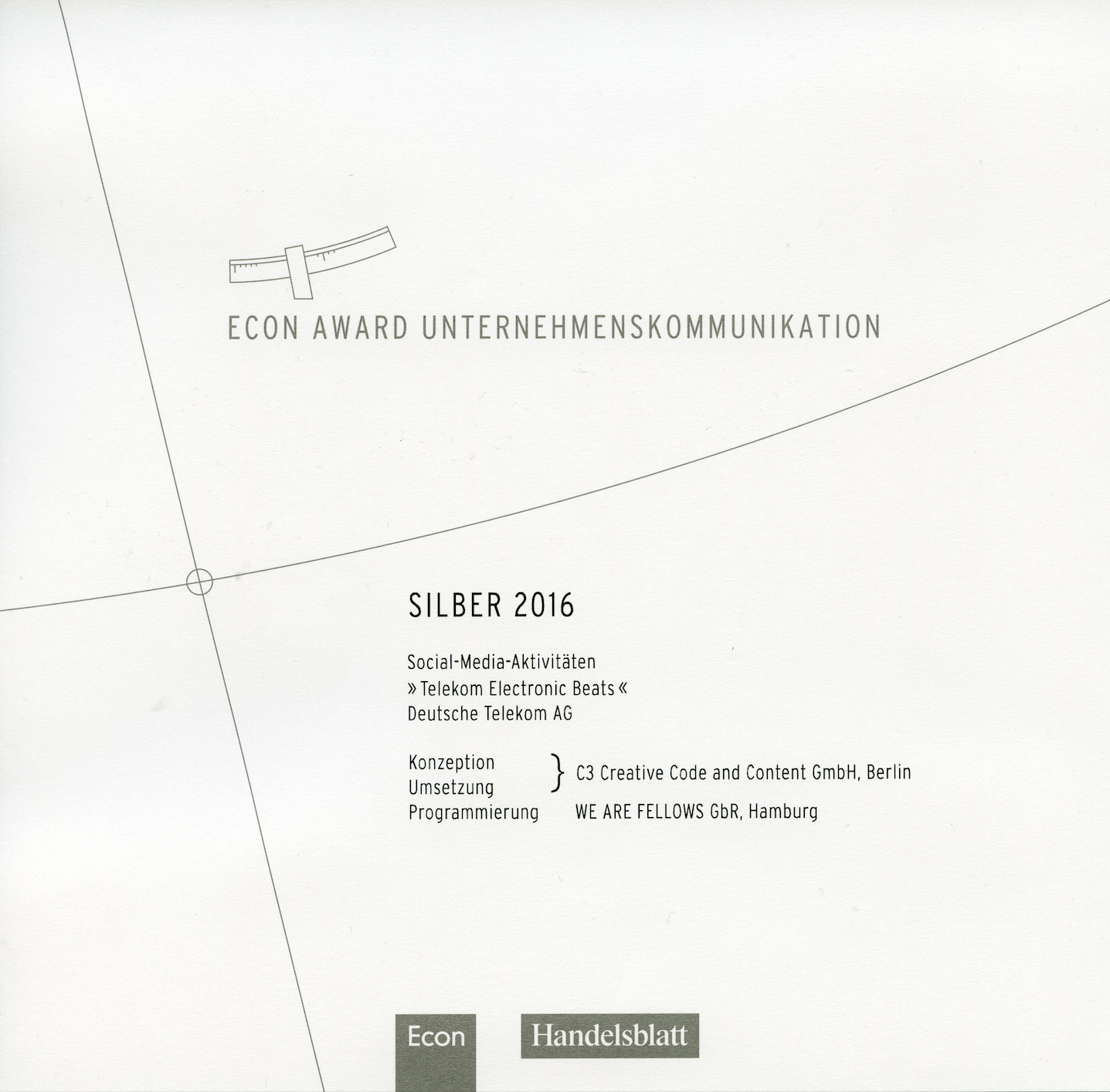
Certificate of Econ Award Unternehmenskommunikation

== Awards ==
Since its inception TEB has won many international publishing and marketing awards, including

- BCP Best of Corporate Publishing Award 2013: Gold in categories "CP Excellence", "B2C - IT/Telekommunikation/Energie" and "Digital Media" as well as a Grand Award in the "Best of Photography" category
- Questar Award 2013: Gold for TEB's DVD magazine Slices
- Art Directors Club 2014: Silver in category "Corporate Publishing"
- BCP - Best of Corporate Publishing 2015: Gold in category "B2C - Medien/Entertainment/Kultur" and Gold in category "Best Crossmedia Solution - Handel und Kosumgüter"
- Best of Content Marketing 2016: Gold in category "Best Crossmedia - Dienstleistung / Handel / Konsumgüter"
- Econ Award Unternehmenskommunikation 2016: Silver in category "Social-Media-Aktivitäten"
- PR Report Awards 2016: Finalist in category "Content-Strategie"
- German Brand Award 2016: Excellence in Brand Strategy, Management and Creation
- Deutscher Digital Award 2016: Silver in category "Websites (stationary and mobile) – Content"
- Questar Awards 2019: Gold in category "YouTube"
- iNOVA Awards 2019: Gold in category "Copy/Scriptwriting" for the reportage Behind Bars: Meet The Georgian Techno Producer Making Music From Prison by Chloé Lula
