= Clausells =

Clausells is a surname. Notable people with the surname include:

- Gilles Clausells (born 1962), French wheelchair rugby league player
- Nicolas Clausells (born 1990), French wheelchair rugby league player

== See also ==
- Claussell, another surname
- Clausell, another surname
- Segundo, Ponce, Puerto Rico
