= Natraj Temple =

Nightclub in Munich, Germany

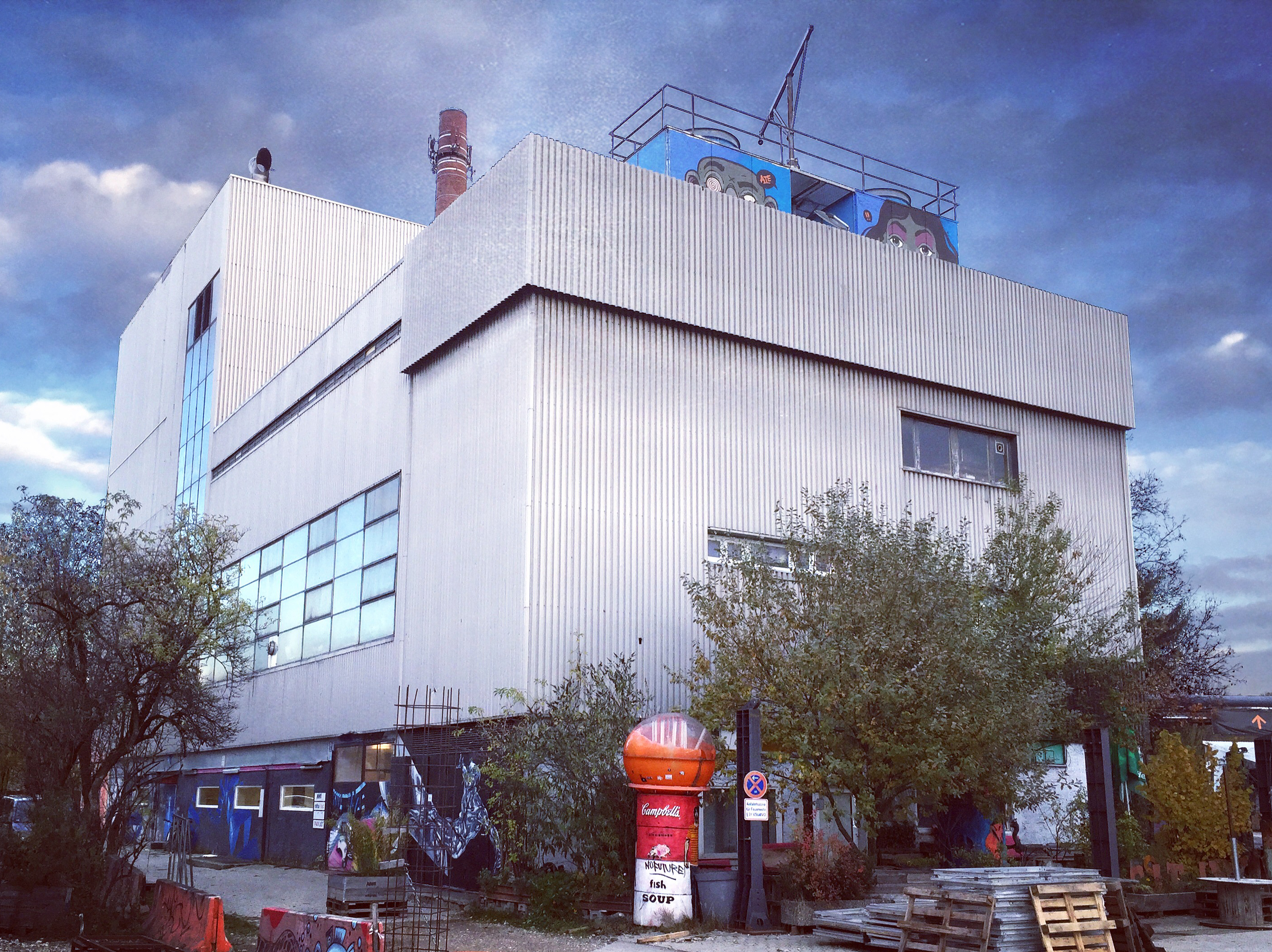
- The former power plant in which the Natraj Temple was located
- Interactive map of Natraj Temple
- Address: Grafinger Str. 6, Kunstpark Ost
- Location: Berg am Laim, Munich, Germany
- Coordinates: 48°7′24.2″N 11°36′31.1″E
- Type: Nightclub
- Event: Psytrance

Construction
- Built: 1970s
- Opened: October 1996
- Closed: 2008

Website
- Natraj Temple

Natraj Temple [natˈrɑːʒ ˈtem.pəl] was a nightclub in Munich, Germany from 1996 to 2008. Germany's first steady psytrance nightclub belonged, besides the Tresor and E-Werk in Berlin, the Dorian Gray and Omen in Frankfurt, and the Munich-based clubs Ultraschall, KW – Das Heizkraftwerk and Millennium, to the most renowned clubs of Germany's 1990s techno culture, and was considered an international centre of the Goa trance movement.

== History and description ==
=== Significance ===
The significance of the Natraj Temple for the rave culture is due to the fact that it was one of only a few clubs that specialized completely in a single subgenre, in this case psytrance. In the Goa and psytrance scene, decorations based on Hindu, Buddhist or shamanic motifs and symbols as well as spirituality and often excessive intoxication play an important role. Accordingly, the media coverage about the nightclub mostly focused on the psychedelic design of the venue, the elaborate art installations and the alternative scene clientele. Thus Der Spiegel described the Natraj Temple as a place "where many colourful cloths decorate the high walls and long-haired people can smoke their joint under purple light and listening to Indian music". The Süddeutsche Zeitung described the interior of the club as "ghost train ambience, fluorescent cobwebs, an Indian, four-armed goddess is rotating in the semi-darkness", and reported about women sitting cross-legged, visitors who talked for hours with the decoration of the club, and about "Goa freaks who left the Natraj Temple half-naked and barefoot in the deepest winter, wallowing in the snow and then calling for an ambulance". Also travel guides and cultural guidebooks reported, besides the musical specialization on psytrance, mostly about the artistic design of the nightclub. The Kulturverführer München reported about a dragon above the dance floor, "cuddly cushions in mysterious niches" and an intense palette of colours in the decoration. Due to these special features the psytrance club made a name for itself also outside the scene throughout Europe.

=== Program and festivals ===
The musical program of the club concentrated on electronic music of the styles psychedelic trance and Goa trance. Often international DJ's and live acts of the psytrance scene played at the Natraj Temple. Regular events at the club carried names like Psychedelic Trance and Special Experience. The Natraj Temple regularly presented his own lovemobiles at Munich's technoparade Union Move and was known for the elaborate and psychedelic design of the floats. The club also organized open air festivals under the name Natraj Summer Dance.

== Location ==
The club was located on the grounds of the Kunstpark Ost factory site in Munich's Berg am Laim district in a disused former power plant. It consisted of a main area with a wooden dance floor, which was surrounded one floor above by a large gallery with the so-called chill-out area, and an adjoining bar room with a kiosk where exotic spices were sold in addition to drinks. In 2003 the Natraj Temple moved into the rooms of the former club K41, and in 2007 once again into the rooms of the former Octagon club.

== Compilation albums ==
The club regularly released compilation albums with names like Natraj Summer Dance or Winterdance.

== See also ==
- List of electronic dance music venues
