= JakoJako =

Turkish-German DJ, composer and producer

JakoJako is the stage/producer name of Sibel Jacqueline Koçer, Turkish-German electronic music DJ, composer and producer.

JakoJako is based in Berlin, performs as resident in Berghain night club and publishes under different labels including Leisure System, Beatport, MUTE Records and its sub label for techno NovaMute. She contributed tracks to compilations on BPitch Control, Tresor and Figure and is known as modular synth (also DIY) artist with wide musical range, from ambient to techno music.

Together with Rødhåd, JakoJako released In Vere in 2022. Metamorphose was the debut album on Bigamo label. In April 2025 Nova Mute released JakoJako's second album Tết 41, Vietnam inspired and produced there, that was named album of the week by Der Spiegel.

JakoJako collaborated with Detect Ensemble, Mareena for Atlas der Gedanken via Edition Dur and remixed Martin Gore’s The Third Chimpanzee Remixed and New Order’s Be a Rebel Remix 12”.
