= Mary Boyoi =

South Sudanese musician

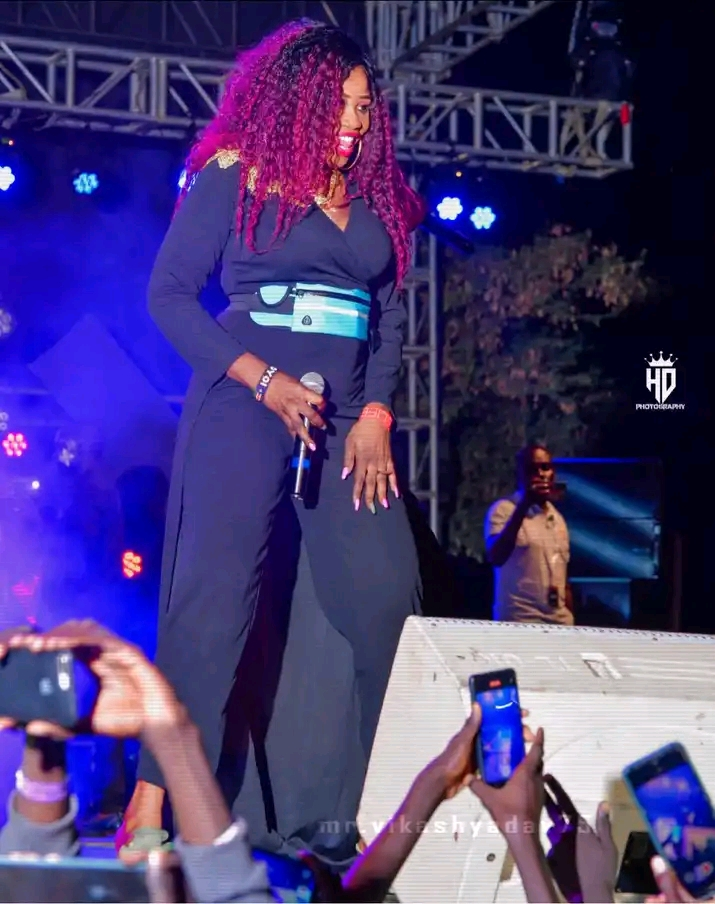
- Born: 12 May 1974 (age 52); Malakal, Democratic Republic of Sudan (now in South Sudan)
- Occupation: Singer
- Years active: c. 2007 – present
- Known for: Music & Politics in South Sudan
- Notable work: Referendum
- Political party: SPLM

Mary Boyoi (born 23 May 1974) is a South Sudanese singer-songwriter and political activist.

== Early life ==
Mary Boyoi was born on 23 May 1974, in Malakal, Democratic Republic of Sudan (now part of South Sudan). Boyoi's father, a Murle tribal chief and military commander within the Sudan People's Liberation Movement was killed in 1989. After her father's death, she and her family spent a number of years in displaced camps in Sudan and refugee camps in Ethiopia to avoid conflicts of the war.

She started singing in Sunday school. She continued her higher education in Kenya and completed a series of diploma courses.

Boyoi is currently the executive director and founder of Voice of the Peace (VOP), a national NGO that provides psycho-social support and referral pathways for medical care to survivors of Gender-Based Violence (GBV).

== Music career ==
Zooz, a song from Boyoi's yet-to-be-released second album, was featured on Sudan Votes Music Hopes in March 2010. Sudan Votes Music Hopes is a collaboration of artists from across Sudan that wrote election songs "to encourage the people of Sudan to make a mark on their future". The SVMH album was compiled by German singer-songwriter Max Herre and is being distributed across Sudan on audio cassettes, radio and digitally via sudanvotes.com. The production was realized by Media in Cooperation and Transition (MICT) and was financed by the German Foreign Office. In August 2012, the Süd Electronic label released a vinyl with house remixes by Tama Sumo and Portable.

In 2011, she performed at an independence celebration in South Sudan.

In 2013, Boyoi released a single Ana Indi Zool, featuring Isaac Mamur. In 2016, she re-released a single, Welet De Tai. A single under the same name was released, featuring Colo.

In 2021, she was nominated at the South Sudan Music Awards in a category of Best Collaboration (Internationally) of the Year, due to her work with Harmonize.

== Political activism ==
In 2002, she began working for humanitarian relief agencies throughout South Sudan.

In 2005, she founded ABONA International, a nonprofit organization aimed at supporting peace throughout South Sudan and providing assistance to girls and young women in violent and destructive situations. In 2007, she began work on her first music project, “Referendum”.

In January 2010, Boyoi was nominated by members of the Murle community to run for a parliamentary seat in the Southern Sudan Legislative Assembly in Juba. She campaigned for the elections that took place in April 2010.

In 2022, she endorsed President Salva Kiir for upcoming elections (who was leading the Sudan People’s Liberation Movement Party at that time).
