= Carlos Segura (footballer) =

Spanish footballer

Personal information
- Full name: Carlos Segura Clausell
- Date of birth: 24 June 2003 (age 23)
- Place of birth: Vilafamés, Spain
- Height: 1.72 m (5 ft 8 in)
- Position: Winger

Team information
- Current team: Gimnàstic

Youth career
- Villafamés
- Primer Toque
- Vall de Uxó
- 2019–2020: Villarreal
- 2020–2021: Roda
- 2021–2022: Villarreal

Senior career*
Years	Team	Apps	(Gls)
2022–2024	Villarreal C	20	(0)
2022–2023	→ Roda (loan)	24	(2)
2024–2026	Castellón B	63	(35)
2025–2026	Castellón	0	(0)
2026–	Gimnàstic	0	(0)
- * Club domestic league appearances and goals as of 9 June 2026

Carlos Segura Clausell (born 24 June 2003) is a Spanish professional footballer who plays for Gimnàstic de Tarragona. Mainly a right winger, he can also play as a right-back.

== Career ==
Born in Vilafamés, Castellón, Valencian Community, Segura began his career with hometown side CF Villafamés, and later played for Primer Toque CF and UD Vall de Uxó before joining Villarreal CF's youth sides in 2019. After being loaned to affiliate side CD Roda ahead of the 2022–23 season in Tercera Federación, he made his senior debut on 10 September 2022, starting and scoring the opener in a 2–1 home win over Atzeneta UE.

Segura returned to the Yellow Submarine in July 2023, being assigned to the C-team also in the fifth division. On 1 June 2024, he moved to CD Castellón and was initially a member of the reserves also in level five.

Segura was Castellón B's top scorer with 16 goals during the 2024–25 campaign, as the side achieved promotion to Segunda Federación. He renewed his contract for a further year on 23 June 2025, and made his debut with the main squad on 30 October, coming on as a late substitute for Tincho Conde in a 1–0 away loss to CA Antoniano, for the season's Copa del Rey.

On 7 May 2026, after being again the top scorer of the B's, Segura renewed his link with the Orelluts. On 13 July, however, he signed a three-year deal with Primera Federación side Gimnàstic de Tarragona.
