= Billy Nasty =

Billy Nasty (real name William Nastri) is a British techno and electro DJ and artist. He is a Guinness World Record holder for the first commercially released DJ mix. Billy Nasty was originally a House music DJ.

His first residency was at the Brain club in London in 1990. He went on to play at clubs such as The End and the Twilo club, and at events such as Tribal Gathering. He founded his own record label Tortured Records in 1995 and continues to make appearances worldwide. He also founded his own Theremin Management company in 1997 to represent himself and other likeminded techno DJs and producers.

== Discography ==
- 2002: BN02 (Trust the DJ)
- "Imperfection"
