= Omar-S =

American electronic musician

Alexander Omar Smith, known professionally as Omar-S, is an electronic music producer from Detroit, Michigan, with a substantial discography that spans the past twenty years.

In more recent years, Smith, the owner/operator of FXHE Records since its inception in 2003, was seen as a mentor and champion of younger Detroit artists such as John FM and HiTech, having released their music on his label and provided a physical space for them throw events.

== Controversies ==
In November 2023, Supercoolwicked, a female Detroit music artist, alleged on her social media that Omar-S broke a wine glass on her head and further physically assaulted her to the degree that it required three people to pull him off her at Paramita Sound, a club/record store in Detroit, on the evening of November 5, after she confronted him over unpaid royalties owed to her for over one year. Both artists have acknowledged that the Detroit Police Department is performing an investigation into the incident. Omar S immediately responded by claiming he was instead attacked by her, “To be scrutinized and called names is one thing, and to suffer the physical abuse by SupercoolWICKED is another... But for her to say that I attacked her is pure and utter fabrication.” Omar S has lengthy history of collaboration, which is why it is notable that his lawyer, Todd Russell Perkins denies that Smith owes supercoolWICKED any royalties, calling the accusation a “profane defaming and false claim” and alleging that Hutson “violently attacked” Omar S at the bar. Shortly thereafter, both John FM and HiTech, who both have releases on Omar S' label FXHE Records, distanced themselves from Smith and condemned his actions via public statements. In the following days, music from both artists released on FXHE was noted to have been removed from streaming platforms.

== Performances ==
In January 2024, Omar-S served as the opening act for Madonna at the Little Caesars Arena stop of her Celebrations tour, despite many in Detroit's music scene having moved to boycott him following his physical altercation with Detroit artist SuperCoolWicked in November of the previous year.

== Discography ==
=== Albums ===
- Just Ask The Lonely (FXHE, 2005)
- 111 (2006)
- It Can Be Done But Only I Can Do It (2011)
- Thank You For Letting Me Be Myself (2013)
- The Best (2016)
- You Want (2020)
- Can't Change (2022)
- Can't Explain (2022)
- The Laugh (2022)

=== EPs ===
- 002 (FHXHE, 2003)
- 003 (2004)
- Track #8 (2004)
- 004 (2004)
- 001 (2004)
- 007 (2005)
- In Side My Head (2005)
- U (2005)
- Side-Trakx-Volume-#-1 (2006)
- 006 (2006)
- 008 (2007)
- Psychotic Photosynthesis (2007)
- Thirteen/Two/Eight (with Shadow Ray) (2007)
- Side-Trakx-Volume#2 (2008)
- The Further You Look - The Less You Will See (2008)
- 1 Out of 853 Beats / Hot Ones Echo Thru The Ghetto (2009)
- Still Serious Nic (2009)
- Brown Valvetrane (Sound Signature, 2009)
- Jive Time (FXHE, 2010)
- Da-Teys (2010)
- These Complimentary Track'x (2010)
- Here's Your Trance Now Dance!! (2011)
- High School Graffiti (2011)
- Sarah (2011)
- Triangulum Australe (Say It In Space) (2012)
- S.E.X. - The Remixes (ft. L'Renee) (2012)
- -998 (2012)
- Wayne County Hill Cop's (Part.2) (with OB Ignitt) (2012)
- Nelson County (2013)
- Annoying Mumbling Alkaholik (2014)
- Motown Methods E.P. (with Luke Hess) (DeepLabs, 2014)
- Romancing The Stone! (FXHE, 2014)
- Side Trak'x Vol 4 (2015)
- The 90's Evolution Of What Is Was (with OB Ignitt) (Obonit, 2015)
- Side Trakx - Volume #3 (FXHE, 2015)
- I Wanna Know (2015)

=== Mix Albums ===
- FYA Detroit (FXHE, 2005)
- FYA#2 Detroit (2006)
- O+N Detroit (2006)
- 1992 (2008)
- Fabric 45 (Fabric, 2009)
- FYA#5 (FXHE, 2010)
- Extract Mix (2011)
- FXHE 10 Year Compilation Mix 1 (2014)
- FXHE 10 Year Compilation Mix 2 (2014)

== See also ==
- Music of Detroit, Michigan
