= Technisches Rathaus =

Building in Germany

Coordinates: 48°07′50″N 11°36′44″E

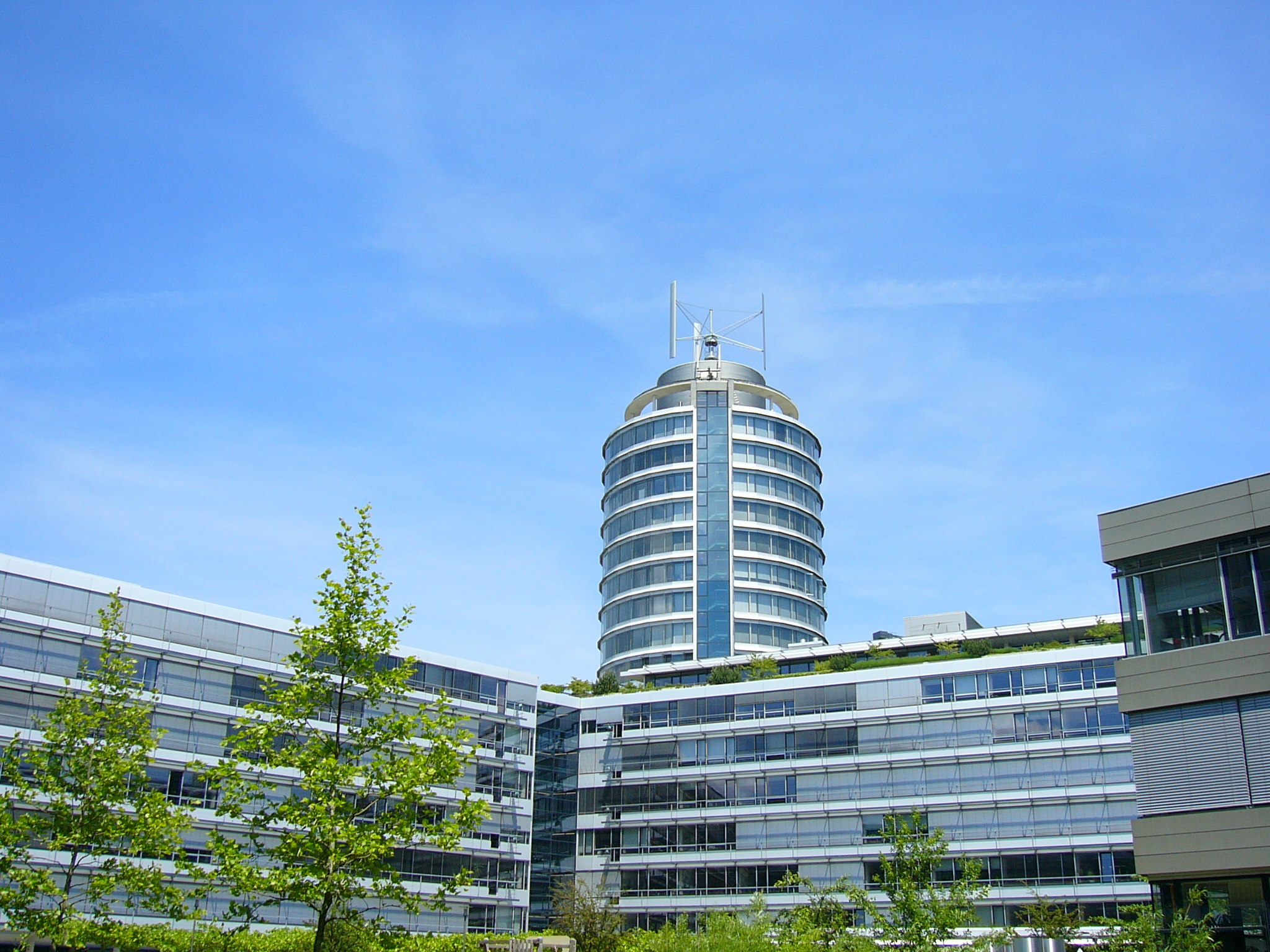
Technisches Rathaus

Technisches Rathaus (German pronunciation: [ˈtɛçnɪʃəs ˈʁaːthaʊs], lit. 'Technical Town Hall') is a building located in Munich, Bavaria, Germany.
