= KW – Das Heizkraftwerk =

Nightclub in Munich, Germany

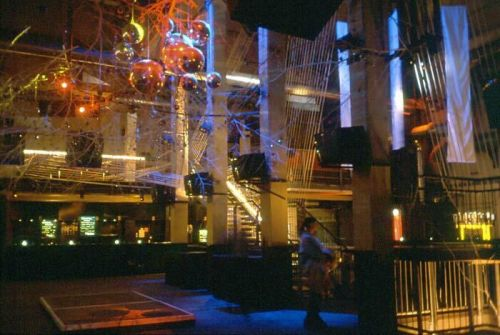
- Main dancefloor of the KW
- Interactive map of KW – Das Heizkraftwerk
- Address: Grafinger Str. 6, Kunstpark Ost
- Location: Berg am Laim, Munich, Germany
- Coordinates: 48°7′24″N 11°36′32″E
- Type: Nightclub
- Events: Techno, House

Construction
- Built: 1950s
- Opened: 1996
- Closed: January 2003

Website
- Official Website

KW – Das Heizkraftwerk was a nightclub in Munich, Germany from 1996 to 2003. The techno club belonged, besides the Tresor and E-Werk in Berlin, the Dorian Gray and Omen in Frankfurt, and the Munich-based clubs Ultraschall, Natraj Temple and Millennium, to the most renowned clubs of Germany's 1990s techno culture.

== History and description ==
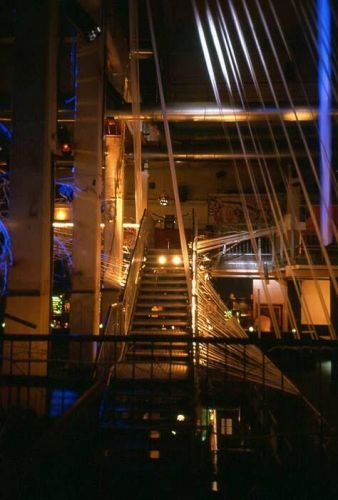
Stairway to the upper area

The nightclub, which in everyday language often was just called KW or Kraftwerk (English: power plant), opened in 1996 in a former combined heat and power plant on the grounds of the Kunstpark Ost, a former factory site of 90.000 m^{2} close to the Ostbahnhof train station in Munich's Berg am Laim district. It was the first large techno club on the grounds of the Kunstpark factory site.

=== Reputation and star DJs ===
The club was renowned for featuring international stars of the techno, house and pop scene. The New Yorker David Morales was the premiere guest at the regular Saturday event called World League, which was held for the first time on 31 October 1996. Alongside Morales, international star DJs and live acts such as Sven Väth, Carl Cox, Paul van Dyk, Armand van Helden, Daft Punk, Masters at Work, Talla 2XLC, Marc Spoon, DJ Sneak, Frankie Knuckles, Bob Sinclar or Westbam performed regularly and often exclusively at the KW, when they were in Munich. Likewise, international pop stars such as Boy George or Jimmy Somerville of Bronski Beat chose the KW for their concerts. Such events then frequently attracted thousands of visitors, many of them arriving from afar, to the Kunstpark Ost, and soon the KW had built up a reputation all over Europe.

=== Program and festivals ===
The musical program of the nightclub concentrated on techno and house music. The Friday event Powerplant laid the focus on techno. In contrast, the Saturday event called World League, which lives on as one of Munich's most famous event series in other clubs to this day, was dedicated to house music as well as guest appearances of international stars. Among the residents of the KW were René Vaitl and DJ Tomcraft. The door policy of the club was regarded as comparably tough. Repeatedly the KW supplied floats to popular technoparades such as Berlin's Love Parade or Munich's Union Move. As well, the club was involved in major events of the techno scene such as Rave City.

=== Closing of the club ===
When the Kunstpark Ost party area had to close after the operator changed, the KW had to close as well on 31 January 2003. The reason given was that the club was too loud. The last record at KW was played again by David Morales, who had already been the premiere guest. While the regular club nights such as the World League continued at other locations and clubs in Munich, the former power plant and techno club was re-used as an indoor adventure park for kids in a cooperation with Munich's Kindl foundation for kids in 2004. It is planned that the old power plant, which still exists today, must make way for the projected central park of Munich's new Werksviertel district.

== Club architecture ==
The club was located in a decommissioned cogeneration power plant of the food manufacturer Pfanni, and poured on the charm of an old industrial production site. Thus it represents an early example of the reutilization of disused power plants and their robust industrial setting as techno clubs, an approach that was later followed by clubs such as Berlin's Berghain (2004), the second Tresor (2007), and Munich's MMA Club (2014). The KW was subdivided into 3 levels: the main area with the main dancefloor, the upper level with the lounge area, and the basement. The hall-like main area was subdivided by several tall concrete columns and a large steel staircase, which led on to the upper level. The club housed several bars, and also had an outdoor chill-out area. Due to the geographical proximity to other popular clubs in Munich such as Ultraschall und Natraj Temple, the club had to deal with a phenomenon called club sharing.

== Gallery ==
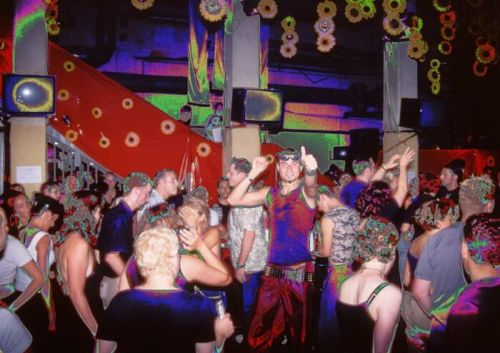

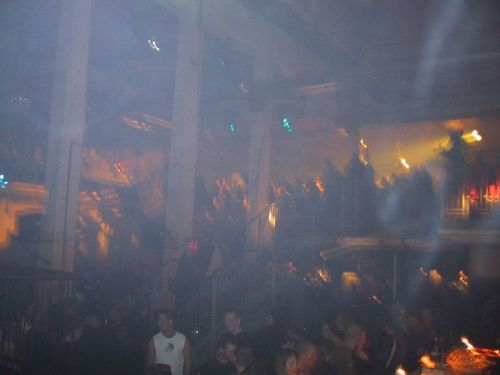

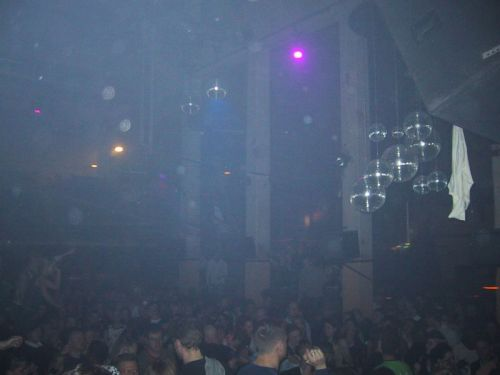

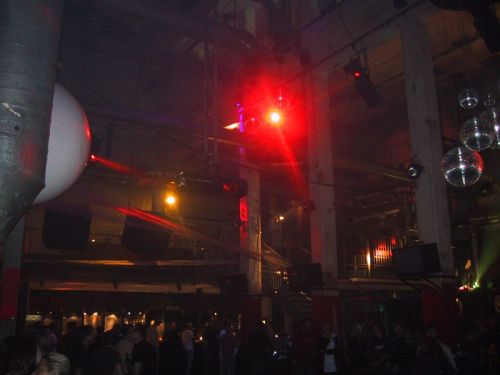

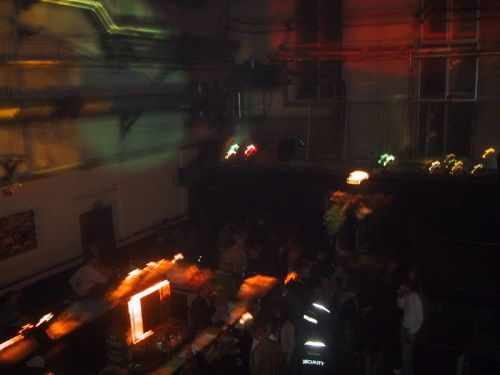

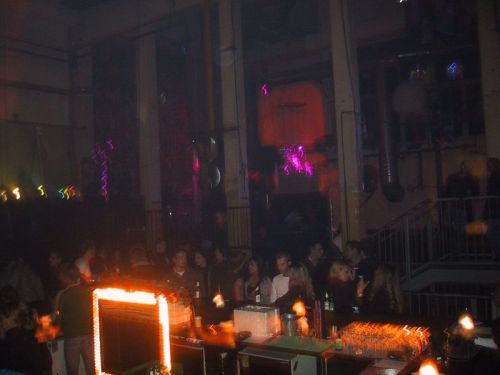

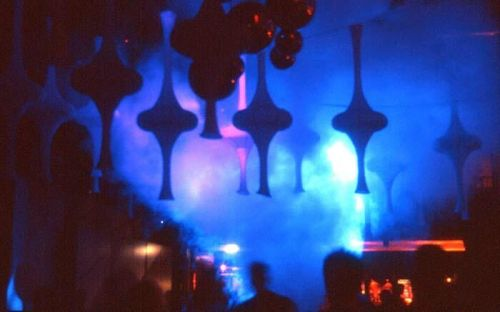

== In popular culture ==
In 2002, the music channel MTV2 Pop chose the KW as one of the "most trendy metropolitan clubs" as a setting for its live televised ODC 40 Club Tour in Germany. In a special by German news magazine Der Spiegel on club culture from 1998, Sven Väth recommends the KW as one of the 5 most trendy clubs. DJ Tomcraft, who was one of the residents at KW, tested his world-famous hit Loneliness (#1 UK Single Charts, #1 UK Dance Charts, #10 DE) on the crowd for the first time at the club. The nightclub was used as a filming location for the popular German ARD crime drama series Tatort (1970–present), doubling as the fictional nightclub K2 in the episode Totentanz ("dance of the dead") with Bela B.

== See also ==
- List of electronic dance music venues
