= DVS1 =

American dance musician

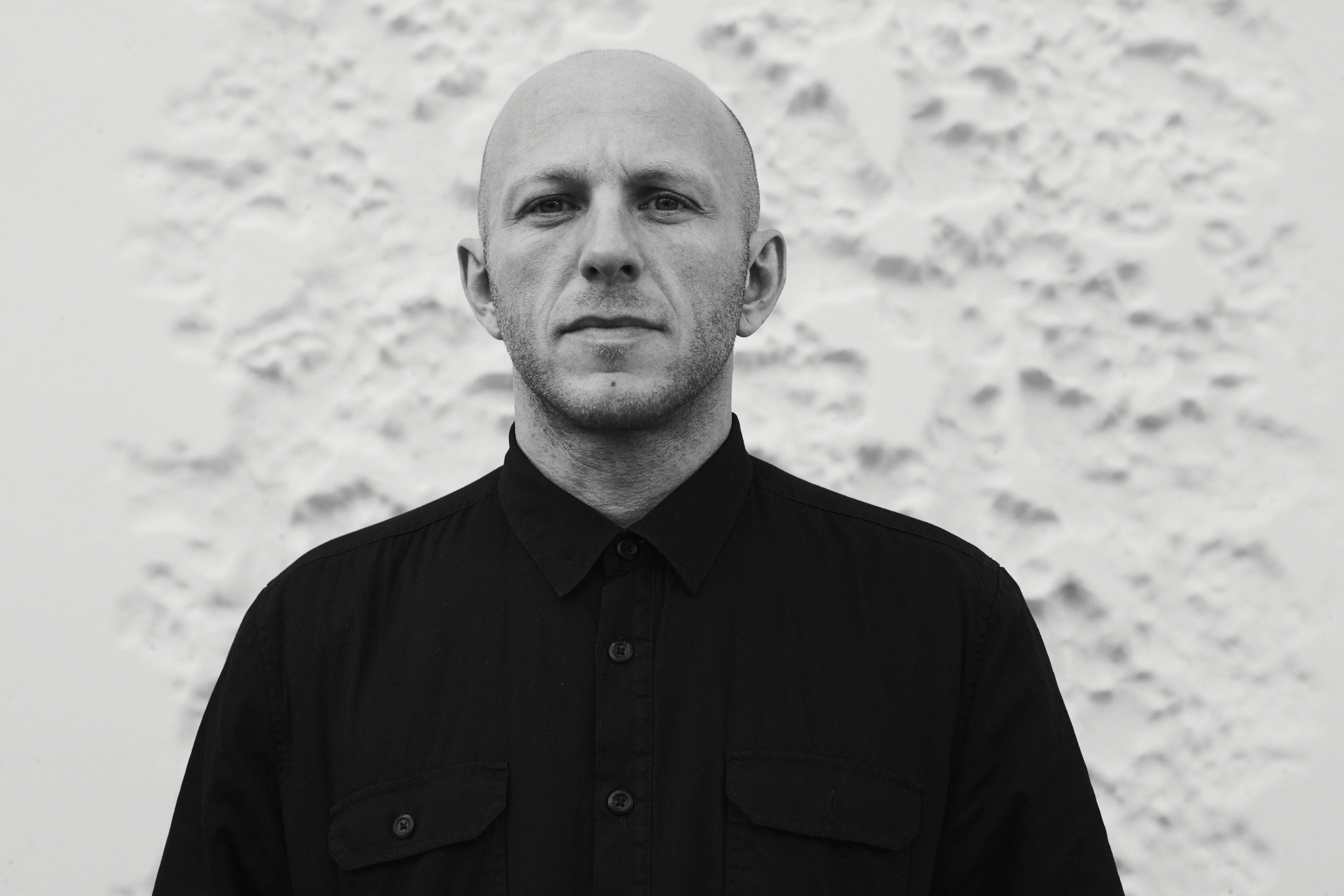

Background information
- Also known as: DVS1
- Born: Zak Khutoretsky; 1976 (age 49–50)
- Origin: Minneapolis, United States
- Genres: Techno, House, Electronic Music
- Occupations: Musician, Music Producer, DJ, disc jockey
- Instruments: Turntables; Synthesizer; Digital audio workstation
- Years active: 1996 - present
- Labels: HUSH, Mistress Recordings, Axis Records, Klockworks, Transmat, Running Back
- Website: hushsound.com

Zak Khutoretsky, also known as DVS1, is an American DJ and techno producer based out of Minneapolis. He has toured extensively, headlined international music festivals such as Decibel and Dekmantel, and played along the likes of techno pioneers Jeff Mills and Robert Hood.

== Early life ==
Khutoretsky was born in 1976 in Saint Petersburg, Russia, then part of the Soviet Union. He moved to the United States at a young age, where he shared his time between New York City and Minneapolis. His parents divorced early on and he spent a good deal of his adolescence in and out of trouble, switching schools several times as a result. Khutoretsky credits eight years of piano lessons and synthesizer-based radio music as his earliest musical influences.

After a teenage initiation into the Midwest rave scene, Khutoretsky began throwing his own underground parties at the age of 18. These parties would be where Khutoretsky first made his name in the scene, overseeing virtually every part of each event from promotion, to sound, to logistics. The parties quickly grew in size and popularity, often hosted in unofficial warehouse venues around the city.

After a brief stint behind bars, Khutoretsky went on to open his own club in Minneapolis, run and operate HUSH Studios, run and operate HUSH sound and make his first steps towards a more legitimate music career.

== Music career ==
DVS1's first release came in 2009, on Ben Klock's influential Klockworks label. To date, he has 8 official vinyl releases and over two dozen remixing credits under his name. In an interview with DJ Times, he stated that he considers himself a DJ first and a producer second.

DVS1 launched his own imprint, HUSH, in 2011. In 2013, he announced the launch of a new sub-label, Mistress Recordings, showcasing "house, techno and everything in between." He described the purpose of the label as a way to release the "secret weapons" of his DJ bag.

Regularly touring all over the world, DVS1 makes relatively frequent appearances at the legendary Berghain nightclub in Berlin, where he plays six to eight times a year. Between his time touring, working in the studio, and preparing sets, he continues to host parties in his home town of Minneapolis, which are held in underground venues and not publicly advertised. In 2019, DVS1 launched Support. Organize. Sustain. in Amsterdam, a series of panel discussions and informational seminars addressing topics and issues facing the electronic music community.

In 2022, Khutoretsky launched Aslice, a platform offering performing, paid DJs the opportunity to voluntarily share their playlists and contribute a portion of their performance fee back to the artists whose music was performed in their sets. Khutoretsky's vision with Aslice is to reduce the disparity between substantial DJ fees and the low royalties for sales and streaming typically earned by artists and music producers. Aslice suggests 5% of a DJs performance fee to be returned to the artists whose music was performed. DJs such as Richie Hawtin, Rødhåd, Oscar Mulero, Surgeon, Amotik, Lindsey Herbert among many others are all actively contributing portions of their DJ fees through Aslice.

An avid vinyl collector, Khutoretsky has over 30,000 records in his personal collection.

== Discography ==
- 2009: Klockworks 05 (Klockworks)
- 2010: Flight To Nowhere (Enemy Records)
- 2010: Love Under Pressure EP (Transmat)
- 2011: "Evolve" / "Submerge" (HUSH)
- 2011: Klockworks 08 (Klockworks)
- 2014: Lost Myself (HUSH)
- 2014: Klockworks 13 (Klockworks)
- 2014: Distress (HUSH)
- 2017: Fabric 96 (fabric London 191)
- 2017: HUSH 20 (HUSH)
- 2020: Beta Sensory Motor Rhythm (Axis Records)
