= Dynamix II =

- Origin: Palm Beach Gardens, Florida
- Genres: Electro, miami bass, breakbeat
- Years active: 1985–present
- Label: Dynamix II Music
- Members: David Noller, Todd Walker
- Past members: Scott Weiser, Claudio Barrella, Lon Alonzo
- Website: http://www.dynamixii.com

Dynamix II is an American DJ act and record label specializing in electro, Florida breaks, and Miami bass. Their 1986 single "Just Give The DJ A Break", reached gold status. Over 600,000+ units of the record were sold and the song reached No. 50 in the United Kingdom in 1987. The record was considered to be a "formative and influential" in the Miami-bass genre. The track was one of first Miami Bass records to use a Roland TR 808 bass drum.

Dynamix II was one of the first "ghetto-bass" acts to gain international recognition. Their music included heavy sampling and has itself been widely sampled including by such acts as the Chemical Brothers.

== History ==
Dynamix II was founded in 1985 by David Noller hailing from Palm Beach Gardens, Florida. David Noller got his start spinning in skating rinks and night clubs. After graduating high school, he attended the Full Sail School for the Recording Arts in Winter Park, Florida where he earned his degree in recording arts. In 1986 David signed to Bass Station Records in Miami, Florida and founded Dynamix II.

Noller teamed up with Lon Alonzo and released "Just Give the DJ a Break"/"Straight from the Jungle"" 12" vinyl on Bass Station Records in Miami. The song went gold, selling well over 600,000 copies in to date. The track peaked at #50 in the UK Singles Chart in 1987.

Noller and Alonzo released only one further 12" vinyl single "Feel The Bass with MC Kid Money & Techno Bass" before dissolving their partnership. Noller retained the Dynamix II title, and then briefly partnered with Claudio Barrella to release the 12" vinyl "Bass Generator/Ignition" & "Dont Touch That Dial" releases in 1990 with Claudio Barella left the band in the same year.

Noller released one album solo available on vinyl and CD as "Dynamix II The Album" which included a remix of Just Give the DJ a break with Breezy Beat MC / The Arrival of Bass/Purple Beats with Alex J. Noller.

In 1990, Scott Weiser auditioned and signed on with the band and they released the full-length CD Album "You Hear it You Fear it" which included "Just Give The DJ A Break (Ultimate Remix)"/"Techno Bass (Remix)", "Feel the Groove", "Machine Language EP", Bass Planet album, Electro Bass Compilation and Color Beats Collection vol 1 on the Dynamix II Music label.

Dynamix II then signed to Joey Boy Records to release: Atomic Age/DJ's go Berzerk 12", "The Electro Megamix Non Stop Mix CD", "We are your Future/Memory Loss" 12" Single & "The 12" vinyl of "The Plastic Men"/"The Two that Return". Dynamix II then signed to Monotone USA to release the 12" single of Pledge Your Allegiance to Electro Funk/Sedona. Dynamix II then released the 12" vinyl of "Ignition Remix/A5 Style" on Freakin USA.

In 1998 the group gained exposure when Richard James' (Aphex Twin) Rephlex label reissued the Electro Megamix: 1985-Present collection.

In 2014 Scott Weiser left the group to pursue his other music project, (Jackal and Hyde). In 2019, Todd Walker joined the group and collaborated on the single 'Got That Booty' on Ravesta Records.

== Discography ==
=== Albums ===
- Dynamix II: The Album (1990), Dynamix II
- You Hear It! You Fear It! (1992), Dynamix II
- Machine Language (1992), Dynamix II
- Bass Planet (1993), Dynamix II
- Color Beats (1994), Dynamix II

Compilations

- Electro Megamix: 1985-Present (1997), Joey Boy
