= Pan-Pot =

German electronic music group

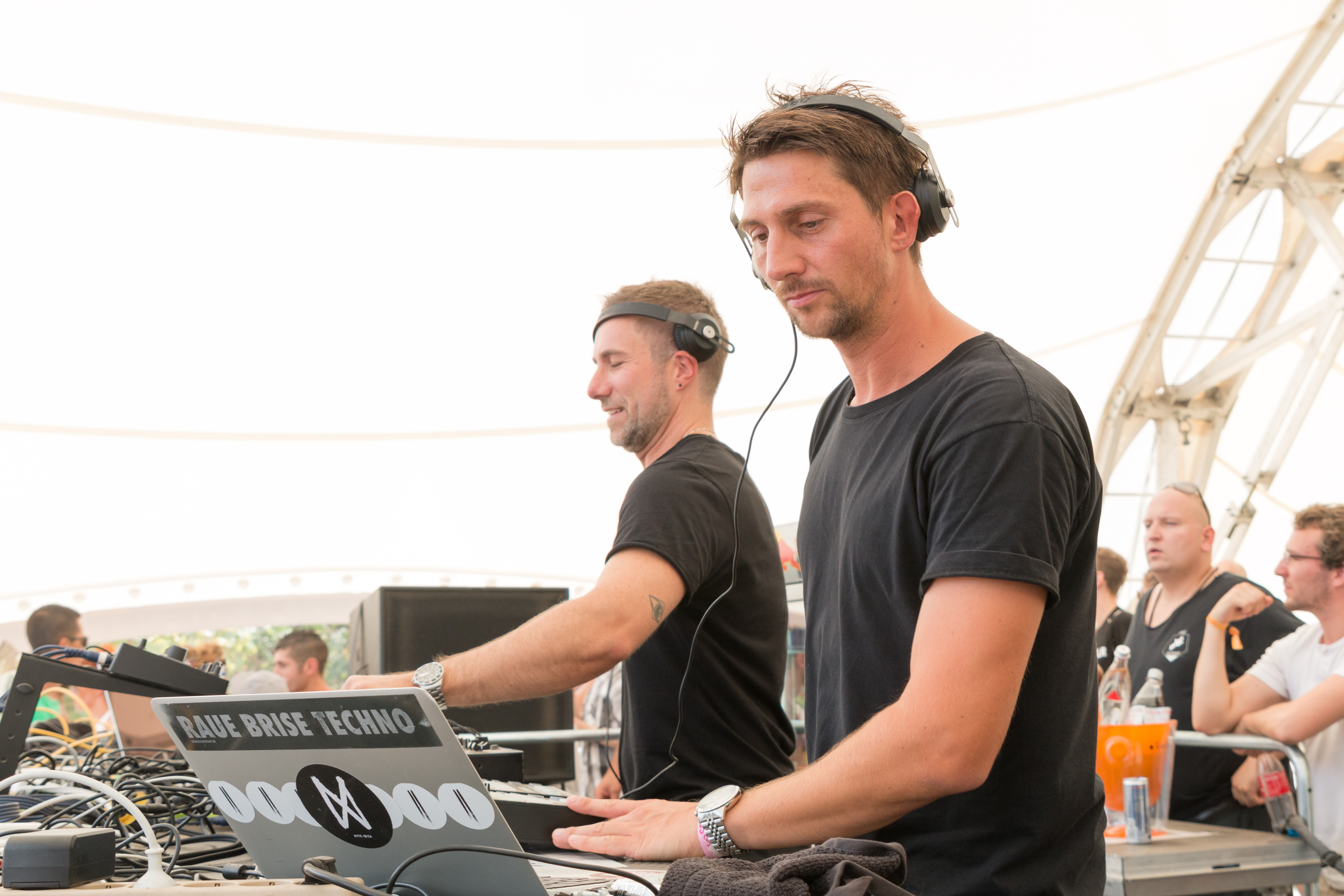

Background information
- Origin: Berlin, Germany
- Genres: Experimental techno, techno, tech house
- Years active: 2004–present
- Labels: Second State Audio, Mobilee, Soma, Einmaleins Musik
- Members: Tassilo Ippenberger; Thomas Benedix
- Website: pan-pot.net

Pan-Pot is the name of the Berlin-based techno duo, German DJs and music producers Tassilo Ippenberger and Thomas Benedix.

Since their launch in 2005, Pan-Pot have established their presence in the modern techno scene, reaching popularity with the release of their debut album, Pan-O-Rama, on Anja Schneider's Mobilee label.

Their repertoire is defined as being underground music that is independent of specific genres, primarily spanning techno and house whilst including experimental elements and IDM influences.

The duo are credited with producing live sets combined with vocals that are described as revealing a deep understanding of the dancefloor needs of clubs and festivals.

== Background ==
Tassilo and Thomas met in 2003 at Berlin’s SAE Institute where they studied audio engineering. There the two producers completed their studies in sound production and design, which helped them in defining Pan-Pot's sound aesthetic when they started producing music together.

In 2005, the duo booked Anja Schneider for one of their events, which coincidentally gave them the opportunity to establish a favorable connection with her then nascent Mobilee imprint. After a few weeks the label launched their second release, which was Pan-Pot's official debut, "Copy and Paste". Since then a steady stream of tracks and remixes have been released on Mobilee and Einmaleins Musik.

The defining moment of Pan-Pot’s career came in 2007, with the release of their debut artist album, Pan-O-Rama. Tracks such as "Charly" and "Captain My Captain" became hits, which made the artists known for their blend of melodic and plain techno and house.

In 2014, Pan-Pot launch the imprint, Second State, signing Amelie Lens and moving into a new chapter of their career.

== Discography ==
=== Albums and EPs ===
- "Maffia" – (Einmaleins Musik, 2004)
- "Popy & Caste" – (Mobilee, 2005)
- "Obscenity" – (Mobilee, 2005)
- "Pious Sin" – (Einmaleins Musik, 2006)
- "Black Lodge" – (Mobilee, 2006)
- "What Is What" – (Mobilee, 2007)
- "Charly" – (Mobilee, 2007)
- Pan-O-Rama – (Mobilee, 2007)
- "Lost Tracks" – (Mobilee, 2008)
- "Confronted" – (Mobilee, 2009)
- "Confronted (The Remixes)" – (Mobilee, 2009)
- "Captain My Captain" – (Mobilee, 2010)
- "Captain My Captain Remixes" – (Mobilee, 2011)
- "Gravity" – (Mobilee, 2012)"
- "White Fiction" – (Mobilee, 2012)
- Mobilee Back to Back Vol.6, Presented by Pan-Pot (Mobilee collection, 2012)
- The Mirror - (Mobilee, 2013)
- Cells - (Second State Audio, 2014)
- Grey Matter - (Second State Audio, 2014)
- Watergate Compilation 17 - (Watergate Records, 2014)
- Conductor - (Watergate Records, 2014)
- The Other - (Second State Audio, 2015)
- The Other Remixes - (Second State Audio, 2015)

=== Remixes ===
- Mathias Schaffhäuser – "Lost Vox" (2005)
- Enliven Deep Acoustics – "Over" (2006)
- Misc. – "Frequenzträger" (2006)
- Anja Schneider & Sebo K – "Rancho Relaxo" (2006)
- Feldah & Koba – "Is Klar" (2006)
- Sweet 'n Candy – "Scrollmops" (2007)
- Damian Schwartz – "Verde Confetti" (2007)
- Tim Xavier – "Deception De Real" (2007)
- Dapayk Solo – "Hagen" (2007)
- Andomat 3000 feat. F.L.O – "Quarzy" (2008)
- Funzion – "Helado en Globos" (2008)
- Anja Schneider – "Mole" (2008)
- Asem Shama – "Kabuki" (2008)
- Brian Ffar – "Billy Bought a Laser" (2009)
- Sian – "Skeleton" (2009)
- Andre Winter – "Dogma" (2009)
- Sebrok – "The Most Dangerous Game!" (2009)
- Pascal Mollin – "The Elephant" (2009)
- Phil Kieran – "Blood of Barcelona" (2010)
- Slam – "Room 2" (2010)
- Dapayk & Padberg – "Sugar" (2010)
- Dustin Zahn & Joel Mull – "Bossa Nossa" (2010)
- Booka Shade – "Regenerate" (2010)
- Marc Romboy vs Stephan Bodzin – "Phobos" (2011)
- Nicone feat. Narra – "Caje" (2011)
- Slam – "Lifetimes (Pan-Pot Remixes)" (2011)
- Kiki & Marco Resmann – "Beggin' for the Heat" (2012)
- Format:B – "Liquid" (2012)
- Simina Grigoriu featuring MAMA – "Kokopelli" (2013)
- Martin Eyerer - "The Cake" (2013)
- Stephan Bodzin - "Zulu" (2015)
