= Tama Sumo =

German DJ and producer

- Born: Kerstin Egert; Mühlhausen, Bavaria, Germany
- Genres: House; techno
- Occupations: DJ; producer
- Years active: 1993–present
- Labels: Ostgut Ton; Süd Electronic

Kerstin Egert, known by the stage name Tama Sumo, is a German DJ and producer who has been called "one of the world's finest house and techno DJs whose success and acclaim stem only from her skills as a selector" by XLR8R. She is signed to the Ostgut Ton label and is a resident DJ at Berghain.

== Life and music career ==
Tama Sumo was born in the village of Mühlhausen, Bavaria, and studied theater and movie science in Erlangen. She was first exposed to acid house music when visiting Nürnberg. She moved to Berlin in 1990. Despite enjoying music, buying many records, and making cassette tapes for her friends, she had no plans to become a DJ. However, her friend Holger booked a set for both of them at the queer bar Drama, where he was a regular DJ. Tama Sumo's first set at Drama bar was in 1993. There, she started out playing mainly New York style vocal house music. Later, she became a regular at Café Moskau, playing the gay Saturday parties there together with Holger. In 1994, they began playing at Tresor and she became a resident DJ there for the next ten years. In 2001, she began playing the Ostgut "Dance with the Aliens" parties, and when Ostgut was succeeded by the Panorama Bar & Berghain, she subsequently became a resident DJ there. She adopted the Tama Sumo pseudonym in 2004. Experiencing an increase in international bookings from 2007 on, she decided to give up her day job in human resources. Her style is varied, including house, techno, jazz, disco, broken beat, soul, funk and Afrobeat.

She was a co-owner of the now-defunct record label Süd Electronic, founded by DJ Lakuti and South African producer Portable.

She cites her wife, Lerato Khathi, known as DJ Lakuti, as a major inspiration for her music. Another major music inspiration is her long-time friend and collaborator, Prosumer.

== Personal life and activism ==
Tama Sumo is married to South African DJ Lakuti. Both of them signed a letter condemning Islamophobia in the wake of the Pulse nightclub shooting. She has criticized the lack of female visibility within DJ lineups and seeks to celebrate difference and diversity in her music. When she appeared on Boiler Room Berlin in 2013, she staged a "kiss-in" with same-sex couples as a protest against homophobic and sexist comments.

She is one of the subjects of the 2013 film Sounds Queer, a documentary about female DJs.

In 2015, she had a private collection of 15,000 records.

== Discography ==
- 2008: Prosumer & Tama Sumo, Play up / Brothers, Sisters (OstGut Ton 14)
- 2009: Panoramabar #2 Mix CD (OstGut Ton 10)
- 2009: Tama Sumo & Prosumer, Alien Mutts (Diamonds & Pearls)
- 2010: Prosumer & Tama Sumo, Rarified EP (OstGut Ton 36)
- 2010: Mount Kimbie, William (Prosumer & Tama Sumo Remix) (Hotflush)
- 2012: Mary Boyoi, Zooz (Tama Sumo Remix) (Süd Electronic)
- 2014: The Knife, Ready To Lose (Tarantism Remix) (Rabid)
