= Joe Claussell =

American record producer (born 1966)

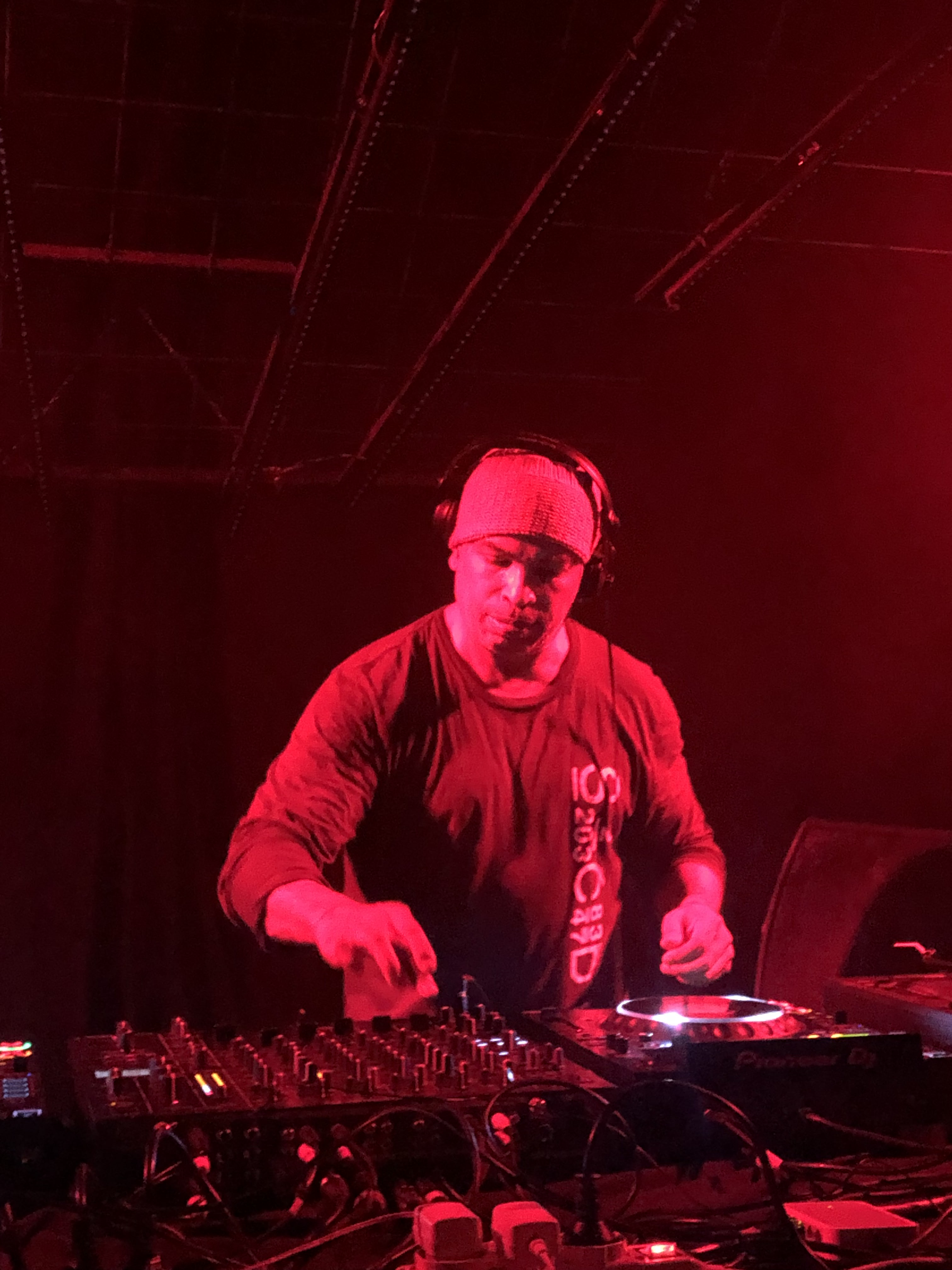
- Claussell performing in Milan, Italy in 2022

Background information
- Born: Joaquin Claussell; 1966 (age 59–60)
- Origin: Brooklyn, New York, U.S.
- Genres: House
- Occupations: Record producer, DJ
- Years active: 1996–present
- Label: Spiritual Life Music
- Website: www.joaquinjoeclaussell.com

Joaquin Claussell (born 1966) is an American record producer and DJ from Brooklyn, New York. He is a co-founder of the party Body & Soul.

== Early life ==
Joe Claussell is of Puerto Rican and French descent. He grew up in Park Slope, Brooklyn, and has seven brothers and three sisters. One of his elder brothers Larry, a Latin rock drummer, got him into the music of Led Zeppelin, Grand Funk Railroad, Black Sabbath, and Jimi Hendrix, among others.

== Career ==
In the late 1980s, Claussell began working at the New York record store Dance Tracks. In 1996, he founded the record label Spiritual Life Music. In that year, Claussell started the party Body & Soul along with Francois Kevorkian and Danny Krivit. In 1999, he released Mix the Vibe, which included productions from Masters at Work, Kerri Chandler, Wamdue Kids, and Dimitri from Paris. In that year, Claussell also released a studio album, Language. In 2008, he released another studio album, Corresponding Echoes.

== Discography ==
=== Studio albums ===
- Language (1999)
- Un.Chained Rhythums (2005)
- Corresponding Echoes (2008)
- Raw Tones (2021)

=== Compilation albums ===
- Mix the Vibe (1999)
- Music... A Reason to Celebrate (2002)
- Translate (2006)
- Africa Caribe (2011)
