= Rødhåd =

German techno music producer and DJ

Mike Bierbach (born 1984), known by the stage name Rødhåd, is a German techno music producer and DJ, living in Berlin.

== Biography ==
Bierbach was born and grew up in East Berlin. Rødhåd means "red head".

In 2009, he co-founded Dystopian, a series of parties that turned into a record label. He is associated with the Berlin nightclub Berghain. Rødhåd is known equally for his work as a music producer as for his DJing.

== Discography ==
=== Albums ===
==== Solo albums ====
- Anxious (Dystopian, 2017)
- Mood (self-released (WSNWG Back To Zero), 2020)
- Revisited (self-released (WSNWG Back To Zero), 2023)
- Ringwelt (self-released (WSNWG Back To Zero), 2023)

==== Albums with JakoJako ====
- & Rødhåd – In Vere (self-released (WSNWG), 2022)

==== Albums with Vril ====
- Out Of Place Artefacts (self-released (WSNWG), 2020)
- Out Of Place Artefacts – II (self-released (WSNWG), 2022)

=== EPs ===
- Söhne Der Erde EP (Dystopian, 2015)
- Kinder Der Ringwelt EP (Dystopian, 2015)
