= Marcel Dettmann =

German DJ and producer

- Born: 26 October 1977 (age 49); Pößneck, Thuringia, East Germany
- Genres: Techno, electronic
- Occupations: DJ, producer, record label owner
- Years active: 1994–present
- Labels: Ostgut Ton; MDR; Rekids

Marcel Dettmann (born 26 October 1977) is a German DJ, producer, and record label owner. Dettmann is a resident DJ at the Berghain nightclub in Berlin. He used to work at Berlin's record store Hard Wax between 2002 and 2012.

In addition to being a producer Dettmann also tours DJing at clubs and electronic music festivals throughout Europe. He owns the label MDR (Marcel Dettmann Records).

Dettmann's formative influences included records by Depeche Mode, The Cure, Cyndi Lauper, OMD and Falco.

== Discography ==
=== Albums ===
- 2010: Dettmann (Ostgut Ton)
- 2013: Dettmann II (Ostgut Ton)
- 2014: Fabric 77 (Fabric)
- 2022: Fear of Programming (Dekmantel Records)

=== Singles ===
- 2006: MDR 01 (Marcel Dettmann Records)
- 2006: Marcel Dettmann / Ben Klock - Dawning / Dead Man Watches The Clock (Ostgut Ton)
- 2006: Quicksand / Getaway (Ostgut Ton)
- 2006: MDR 02(3 Versions) (Marcel Dettmann Records)
- 2007: Marcel Dettmann | Ben Klock - Scenario (Ostgut Ton)
- 2008: Pigon / Marcel Dettmann - Kamm / Plain (Beatstreet)
- 2008: MDR 04 (Marcel Dettmann Records)
- 2009: MDR 06 (Marcel Dettmann Records)
- 2009: Marcel Dettmann / Tama Sumo & Prosumer - Phantasma Vol. 3 (12") (Diamonds & Pearls Music)
- 2010: Dettmann Remixed (Ostgut Ton)
- 2011: Deluge / Duel (50Weapons)
- 2011: Translation EP (Ostgut Ton)
- 2011: Kontra-Mokira-Mixes (12") (Kontra-Musik)
- 2012: Landscape (Music Man Records)
- 2012: Range EP (Ostgut Ton)
- 2013: Marcel Dettmann / Lucy - Untitled (Bleep)
- 2013: Corebox (James Ruskin Mixes) (Marcel Dettmann Records)
- 2013: Linux / Ellipse (50Weapons)
- 2013: Marcel Dettmann / Ben Klock - Dawning/Dawning (Revisited) (Ostgut Ton)
- 2014: Planetary Assault Systems Remixes (Marcel Dettmann Records)
- 2014: Marcel Dettmann / Frank Wiedemann - Masse Remixes II (Ostgut Ton)
- 2014: Marcel Dettmann featuring Emika - Seduction (Ostgut Ton)

=== Remixes ===
- 2007: Ellen Allien - Go (Dettmann Remix) (Bpitch Control)
- 2008: Kevin Gorman - SevenAightNine (Dettmann Remix) (Mikrowave)
- 2008: Len Faki - My Black Sheep (Dettmann Remix) (Figure)
- 2008: Scuba - From Within (Marcel Dettmann Remix) (Hotflush)
- 2008: Modeselektor - Black Block (Dettmann Remix) (Bpitch Control)
- 2010: Junior Boys - Work (Dettmann Remix) (Ostgut Ton)
- 2010: Glimpse - Enjoyable Employable (Crosstown Rebels)
- 2011: Fever Ray - Seven (Dettmann Remix) (Rabid Records)
- 2013: Moderat - Bad Kingdom (Dettmann Remix) (50 Weapons)
- 2014: Darksky - Rainkist (Dettmann Remix) (Monkey Town Records)
