= Ben Klock =

German electronic musician

- Born: 1972 (age 53–54); Schöneberg, West Berlin, West Germany
- Origin: Germany
- Genres: Techno
- Occupations: Producer, DJ & Label Owner
- Years active: 1998–present
- Labels: Ostgut Ton; Klockworks; LAYER

Ben Klock (born 1972) is a German techno artist, DJ, and record label owner. He is resident at Berghain, a techno club in Berlin. In 2006 he founded the techno label Klockworks.

== Discography ==
=== Solo albums ===
- One (2009)

=== Albums with Marcel Dettman ===
- Scenario (2007)
- Phantom Studies (2017)

=== Albums with Fadi Mohem ===
- LAYER ONE (2024)

=== Solo singles and EPs ===
- Klockworks EP (1998)
- I Love You (2000)
- Glow (2003)
- Tag Der Arbeit (2003)
- Back (2005)
- Earthquake (2005)
- Big Time (2006)
- Czeslawa / Warszawa (2007)
- October (2008)
- Before One (2009)
- Ben Klock Remixes (2009)
- Tracks from 07 (2010)
- Compression Session (2010)

=== Singles and EPs with others ===
- Camping 01 (2007) – split with Safety Scissors
- Dawning Revisited – Marcel Dettmann & Klock (2013)
- War Lullaby – Lucy & Klock (2015)
- Klockworks 34 – Ben Klock & Fadi Mohem (2022)
- Clean Slate – Ben Klock & Fadi Mohem feat. Coby Sey (2024)

=== DJ mixes ===
- RA.063 (2007)
- FACT MIX 31 (2009)
- CLR PODCAST 017 (2009)
- CLR PODCAST 25 (2009)
- BERGHAIN 04 (2010)
- TRAX 141 (2010)
- CLR PODCAST 121 (2011)
- FABRIC 66 (2012)
- RA.EX123 Ben Klock (2012)
- BBC Radio 1's Essential mix Ben Klock (2015)
- UNTITLED MIXMAG (2016)
