= German techno =

Techno music and scenes in Germany

German techno is the techno music made and played in Germany, and the club and rave culture that grew around it from the late 1980s onwards. Germany developed one of the world's largest and most influential techno scenes. In the late 1980s, early techno scenes emerged in Frankfurt and Berlin, with significant scenes soon also growing in Munich, Cologne and elsewhere.

The word techno was in use in Frankfurt in the early 1980s for electronic body music and synth-pop, before being attached at the end of the decade to the house-derived dance music arriving from Chicago and Detroit. After the fall of the Berlin Wall in 1989, empty buildings in the former East Berlin became home to clubs such as Tresor, and techno became a soundtrack to German reunification. The Love Parade grew from about 150 people in 1989 to a reported 1.5 million in 1999. German scenes went on to originate or shape trance, dub techno, minimal techno and schranz, and in 2024 Berlin's techno culture was added to Germany's national inventory of intangible cultural heritage.

== History ==
=== Origins: Frankfurt and the word "techno" ===
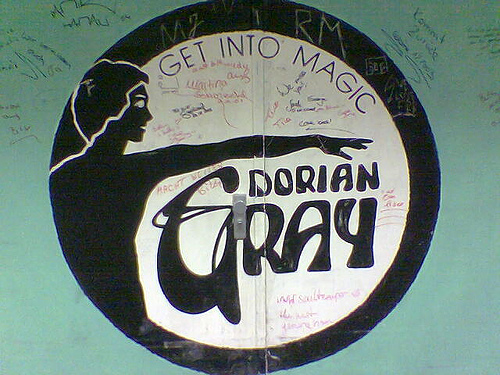
Doorway to Dorian Gray in Frankfurt, venue of the dance event Technoclub by Talla 2XLC

In 1982, while working at Frankfurt's City Music record store, DJ Talla 2XLC started to use the term techno to categorize artists such as Depeche Mode, Front 242, Heaven 17, Kraftwerk and New Order, with the word used as shorthand for technologically created dance music. Talla's categorization became a point of reference for other DJs, including Sven Väth. Talla further popularized the term in Germany when he founded Technoclub at Frankfurt's No Name Club in 1984, which later moved to the Dorian Gray club in 1987. Talla's club spot served as the hub for the regional EBM and electronic music scene, and according to Jürgen Laarmann, of Frontpage magazine, it had historical merit in being the first club in Germany to play almost exclusively EDM.

Radio host François Mürner from Swiss National Radio DRS 3, now SRF 3, used the term techno in his daily two hours radio show Sounds! as early as 1983 to categorize artists such as Depeche Mode, Front 242, Heaven 17, Kraftwerk and New Order.

=== Frankfurt tape scene ===
Inspired by Talla's music selection, in the early 80s several young artists from Frankfurt started to experiment on cassette tapes with electronic music coming from the City Music record store, mixing the latest catalogue with additional electronic sounds and pitched BPM. This became known as the Frankfurt tape scene.

The Frankfurt tape scene evolved around the early and experimental work done by the likes of Tobias Freund, Uwe Schmidt, Lars Müller and Martin Schopf. Some of the work done by Andreas Tomalla, Markus Nikolai and Thomas Franzmann evolved in collaborative work under the Bigod 20 collective. While this early work was strongly characterized as experimental electronic music fused with strong EBM, krautrock, synth-pop and technopop influences, the later work during the mid and late 1980s clearly transitioned to a clear techno sound.

=== Acid house and the Love Parade ===
By 1987 a German party scene based around the Chicago sound was well established. In the late 1980s, acid house also established itself in West Germany as a new trend in clubs and discotheques. In 1988, the Ufo opened in West Berlin, an illegal venue for acid house parties, which existed until 1990. In Munich at this time, the Negerhalle (1983–1989) and the ETA-Halle established themselves as the first acid house clubs in temporarily used, dilapidated industrial halls, marking the beginning of the so-called "hall culture" in Germany.

In July 1989 Dr. Motte and Danielle de Picciotto organized the first Love Parade in West Berlin, just a few months before the Fall of the Berlin Wall.

=== Fall of the Wall and Berlin ===
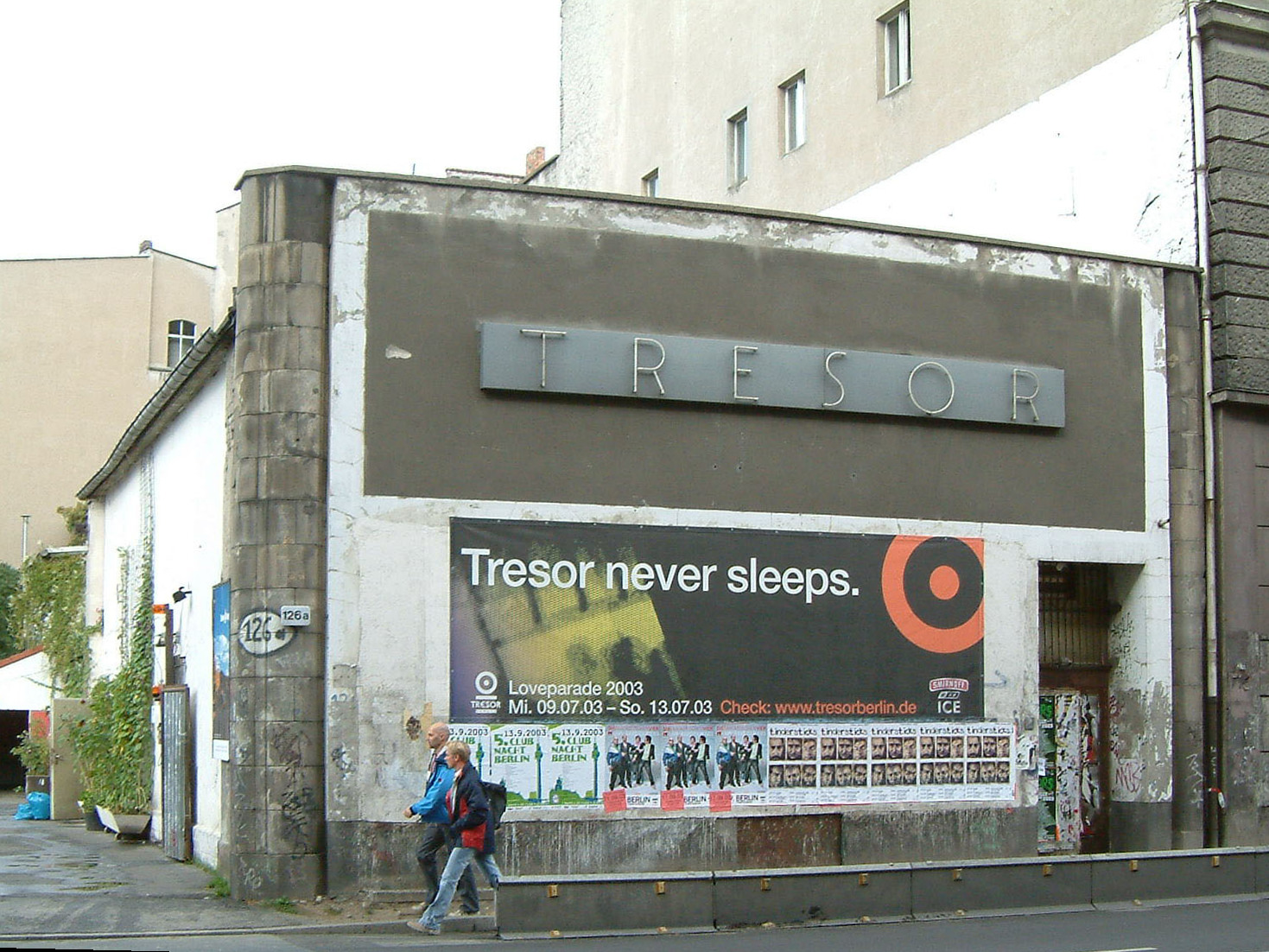
The original Tresor club (1991–2005)

Following the fall of the Berlin Wall on 9 November 1989 and the German reunification in October 1990, free underground techno parties mushroomed in East Berlin. East German DJ Paul van Dyk has remarked that techno was a major force in reestablishing social connections between East and West Germany during the unification period. In the now reunified Berlin, several locations opened near the foundations of the Berlin Wall in the former eastern part of the city from 1991 onwards: the Tresor (est. 1991), the Planet (1991–1993), the Bunker (1992–1996), and the E-Werk (1993–1997). It was in Tresor at this time that a trend in paramilitary clothing was established (amongst the techno fraternity) by DJ Tanith; possibly as an expression of a commitment to the underground aesthetic of the music, or perhaps influenced by UR's paramilitary posturing. In the same period, German DJs began intensifying the speed and abrasiveness of the sound, as an acid infused techno began transmuting into hardcore. DJ Tanith commented at the time that "Berlin was always hardcore, hardcore hippie, hardcore punk, and now we have a very hardcore house sound." This emerging sound is thought to have been influenced by Dutch gabber and Belgian hardcore; styles that were in their own unique way paying homage to Underground Resistance and Richie Hawtin's Plus 8 Records. Other influences on the development of this style were European electronic body music (EBM) groups of the mid-1980s such as DAF, Front 242, and Nitzer Ebb.

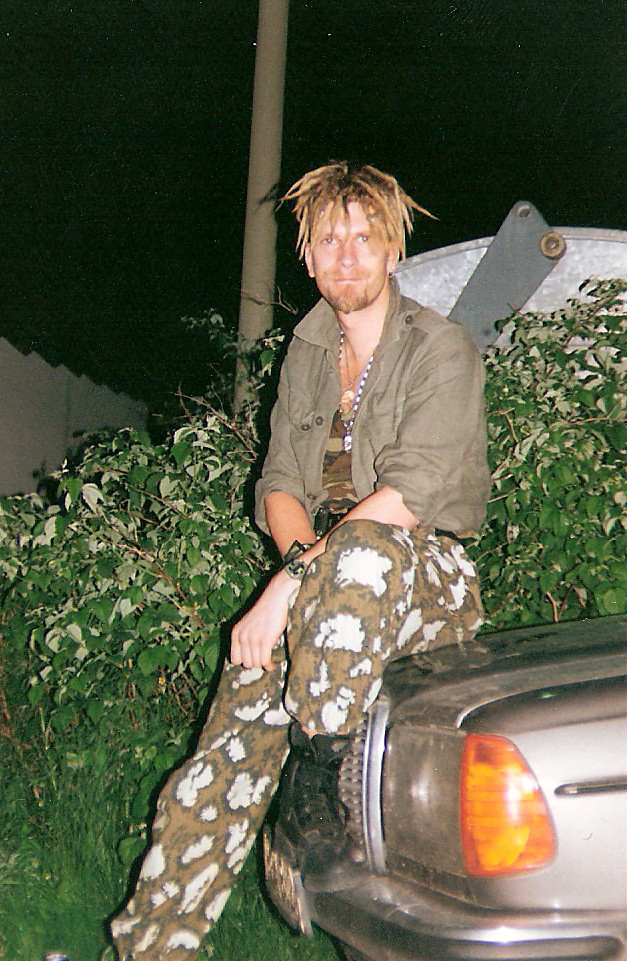
Tanith in 1994

The opening of East Berlin left large numbers of empty and disused buildings, including parts of the former border strip, with uncertain ownership, and in the early 1990s the authorities paid little attention to what happened in them. Artists, squatters and promoters turned them into temporary clubs, and techno brought young people from East and West Berlin together well before the rest of the country. The DJ and producer Ellen Allien, who had grown up in West Berlin, described the fall of the Wall as having "freed my mind and soul", bringing space and new people to the city; she said that West Berlin had felt like living in a cage, and that the clubs became a meeting point for a new generation to reconnect with their city. Allien had begun DJing at Fischlabor, a bar run by Dimitri Hegemann in the year before he opened Tresor; she went on to broadcast her Kiss FM radio show Braincandy live from Tresor, played its Sunday after-hours party Club the Rest, and in 1999 co-founded the label BPitch.

For young people from the East, the experience was more mixed. The producer René Pawlowitz (Shed), who was 14 and living in a small town outside Berlin when the Wall came down, recalled that there had been no club music in the GDR beyond occasional tapes of acid house, and that his formative experience was hearing British rave records on the radio without any context. Although he went to parties in Berlin almost every weekend in the 1990s, he found the mood among many East Germans after reunification so bleak that he moved west in 1997, returning to Berlin only in 2002.

=== Frankfurt, the Omen and trance ===
Changes were also taking place in Frankfurt during the same period but it did not share the egalitarian approach found in the Berlin party scene. It was instead very much centered around discothèques and existing arrangements with various club owners. In 1988, after the Omen opened, the Frankfurt dance music scene was allegedly dominated by the club's management and they made it difficult for other promoters to get a start. By the early 1990s Sven Väth had become perhaps the first DJ in Germany to be worshipped like a rock star. He performed center stage with his fans facing him, and as co-owner of Omen, he is believed to have been the first techno DJ to run his own club. One of the few real alternatives then was The Bruckenkopf in Mainz, underneath a Rhine bridge, a venue that offered a non-commercial alternative to Frankfurt's discothèque-based clubs. Other notable underground parties were those run by Force Inc. Music Works and Ata & Heiko from Playhouse records (Ongaku Musik). By 1992 DJ Dag & Torsten Fenslau were running a Sunday morning session at Dorian Gray, a plush discothèque near the Frankfurt airport. They initially played a mix of different styles including Belgian new beat, Deep House, Chicago House, and synth-pop such as Kraftwerk and Yello and it was out of this blend of styles that the Frankfurt trance scene is believed to have emerged.

In 1991 Väth founded the label Eye Q with his manager Heinz Roth and Matthias Hoffmann, followed by the harder, more minimal sub-label Harthouse. Their releases, by artists including Väth, Hoffmann (as A.C. Boutsen), Ralf Hildenbeutel and Hardfloor, defined what became known as the "Sound of Frankfurt", a key early form of trance. Väth and Hoffmann left the labels in 1997.

=== Munich ===
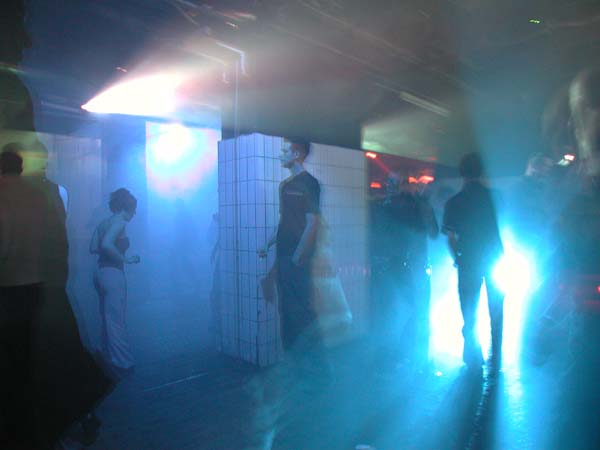
Ravers at the Ultraschall techno club

In 1976 Munich became the setting for a milestone in the development of electronic dance music and proto-techno. That year, at Musicland Studios, Giorgio Moroder produced the track I Feel Love, which has been described as a blueprint for techno and house. It was the first track to combine repetitive synthesizer loops with a continuous four-on-the-floor bass drum and an off-beat hi-hat, which would become a main feature of techno and house ten years later.

In 1990, the Babalu Club, the first afterhours techno club in Germany, opened in Munich and was a place for the formation of the southern German techno scene, where protagonists such as DJ Hell, Monika Kruse, Tom Novy or Woody came together. From 1993 to 1996, as part of Munich’s hall culture, the former departure halls of the city's Riem airport, the Zeppelinhalle (Hit FM Hall), Charterhalle, Terminal 1, and Wappensaal became the setting of major events of the scene such as Rave City or Universe Rave – Tribal Gathering.

In 1994, the Ultraschall techno club opened, followed by KW – Das Heizkraftwerk in 1996. In the same year, Natraj Temple, a psychedelically decorated club that became an international hub of the psytrance scene opened. During the 1990s, all three clubs were among the most widely known clubs in Germany.

In 1991, Peter Wacha founded the record label Disko B, which specialized in techno. In 1996, DJ Hell founded the record label International DeeJay Gigolo Records in Munich, which mixed techno with 80's pop and disco influences and became the germ cell of the electroclash music genre in the late 1990s. Further labels include Compost Records, founded by Michael Reinboth in 1994, Kurbel Records by Richard Bartz, as well as Kosmo Music featuring artists such as Tom Novy, Tomcraft, Da Hool or Niels van Gogh.

In 1995, the first Union Move took place in Munich, a technoparade that drew up to 100,000 participants.

=== Tekkno versus techno ===
In Germany, fans started to refer to the harder techno sound emerging in the early 1990s as Tekkno (or Brett). This alternative spelling, with varying numbers of ks, began as a tongue-in-cheek attempt to emphasize the music's hardness, but by the mid-1990s it came to be associated with a controversial point of view that the music was and perhaps always had been wholly separate from Detroit's techno, deriving instead from a 1980s EBM-oriented club scene cultivated in part by DJ/musician Talla 2XLC in Frankfurt.

=== Frankfurt and Berlin definitions ===
At some point tension over "who defines techno" arose between scenes in Frankfurt and Berlin. DJ Tanith has expressed that Techno as a term already existed in Germany but was to a large extent undefined "or rather there were two schools": techno meaning music from Front 242 and the like (as defined in Frankfurt) and the new techno (as defined in Berlin), see at around 34:20). Dimitri Hegemann has stated that the Frankfurt definition of techno associated with Talla's Technoclub differed from that used in Berlin. Frankfurt's Armin Johnert viewed techno as having its roots in acts such DAF, Cabaret Voltaire, and Suicide, but a younger generation of club goers had a perception of the older EBM and Industrial as handed down and outdated. The Berlin scene offered an alternative and many began embracing an imported sound that was being referred to as Techno-House. The move away from EBM had started in Berlin when acid house became popular, thanks to Monika Dietl's radio show on SFB 4. Tanith distinguished acid-based dance music from the earlier approaches, whether it be DAF or Nitzer Ebb, because the latter was aggressive, he felt that it epitomized "being against something," but of acid house he said, "it's electronic, it's fun, it's nice." By Spring 1990, Tanith, along with Wolle XDP, an East-Berlin party organizer responsible for the X-tasy Dance Project, were organizing the first large scale rave events in Germany. This development would lead to a permanent move away from the sound associated with Techno-House and toward a hard edged mix of music that came to define Tanith and Wolle's Tekknozid parties. According to Wolle it was an "out and out rejection of disco values," instead they created a "sound storm" and encouraged a form of "dance floor socialism," where the DJ was not placed in the middle and you "lose yourself in light and sound."

In June 1992 magazine Frontpage (techno magazine) that started out as a magazine for techno according to the Frankfurt definition and then gradually started to incorporate techno according to the Berlin definition splits into two separate magazines, one for techno according to the Frankfurt definition (under the name de:New Life Soundmagazine) and one for techno according to the Berlin definition (under the name of Frontpage, the next generation), since "House/Technohouse and EBM/Electro are two completely different worlds" (translated from German).

In the end the Frankfurt definition had to give way to the Berlin definition of "techno".

=== Berlin and Detroit: A Techno Alliance ===
Developments in American-produced techno between 1990 and 1992 fueled the expansion and eventual divergence of techno in Europe, particularly in Germany. In Berlin, the club Tresor which had opened in 1991 for a time was the standard bearer for techno and played host to many of the leading Detroit producers, some of whom had relocated to Berlin. The club brought new life to the careers of Detroit artists such as Santonio Echols, Eddie Fowlkes and Blake Baxter, who played there alongside established Berlin DJs such as Dr. Motte and Tanith. According to Dan Sicko, "Germany's growing scene in the early 1990s was the beginning of techno's decentralization", and "techno began to create its second logical center in Berlin". At this time, the now reunified Berlin also began to regain its position as the musical capital of Germany.

In 1993, the German techno label Tresor Records released the compilation album Tresor II: Berlin & Detroit – A Techno Alliance, a testament to the influence of the Detroit sound upon the German techno scene and a celebration of a "mutual admiration pact" between the two cities. As the mid-1990s approached, Berlin was becoming a haven for Detroit producers; Jeff Mills and Blake Baxter even resided there for a time. In the same period, with the assistance of Tresor, Underground Resistance released their X-101/X-102/X103 album series, Juan Atkins collaborated with 3MB's Thomas Fehlmann and Moritz Von Oswald and Tresor-affiliated label Basic Channel had its releases mastered by Detroit's National Sound Corporation, the main mastering house for the entire Detroit dance music scene. In a sense, popular electronic music had come full circle, returning to Germany, home of a primary influence on the EDM of the 1980s: Düsseldorf's Kraftwerk. The dance sounds of Chicago and Detroit also had another German connection, as it was in Munich that Giorgio Moroder and Pete Bellotte first produced the synthesizer-generated Eurodisco sound, including the seminal four-on-the-floor track I Feel Love.

=== Hard Wax, Basic Channel and dub techno ===
Mark Ernestus opened the Hard Wax record shop in Berlin's Kreuzberg in 1989, and it became a hub for the city's techno scene and for visiting artists, stocking techno alongside reggae and dub. In 1993 Ernestus and Moritz von Oswald, who was then working as an in-house producer for Tresor, founded Basic Channel, whose releases combined the reduced structures of techno with the echo and delay of dub. Basic Channel and its offshoots, including Chain Reaction, Main Street and Rhythm & Sound, are regarded as founding the style later known as dub techno, and as a major influence on minimal techno. Hard Wax and Basic Channel also strengthened the links between Berlin and Detroit, distributing Detroit records to shops across Europe.

=== Mainstream rave and the Love Parade ===
In 1993–94 rave became a mainstream music phenomenon in Germany, seeing with it a return to "melody, New Age elements, insistently kitsch harmonies and timbres". This undermining of the German underground sound lead to the consolidation of a German "rave establishment," spearheaded by the party organisation Mayday, with its record label Low Spirit, WestBam, Marusha, and a music channel called VIVA. At this time the German popular music charts were riddled with Low Spirit "pop-Tekno" German folk music reinterpretations of tunes such as "Somewhere Over The Rainbow" and "Tears Don't Lie", many of which became hits. At the same time, in Frankfurt, a supposed alternative was a music characterized by Simon Reynolds as "moribund, middlebrow Electro-Trance music, as represented by Frankfurt's own Sven Väth and his Harthouse label." Illegal raves, however, regained importance in the German techno scene as a countermovement to the commercial mass raves in the mid-1990s.

The Love Parade itself grew from around 150 people in 1989 to roughly half a million by 1996, when it outgrew the Kurfürstendamm and moved to the Straße des 17. Juni, and to a record 1.5 million in 1999. As it grew, it drew criticism for commercialisation, and disputes with the Berlin Senate over noise and litter. After moving to the Ruhr in 2007, the parade ended after 21 people were killed in a crush at the 2010 event in Duisburg. Its founder Dr. Motte later started a non-commercial successor, Rave The Planet, in 2022.

=== Schranz ===
In Frankfurt, the Omen resident Chris Liebing and his friend DJ Toe, who worked at the Boy Records shop, coined the term schranz in 1997 on Liebing's show on the Cologne radio station Evosonic. They were looking for a word for the distorted, metallic techno they were hearing from British producers such as Surgeon and Regis, associated with the Birmingham sound; the term moved from "Shreddert" through "Schranzig" to "Schranz", gained its own section in Boy Records, and stuck after a "Birthday Schranz" party Liebing threw at the Omen in December 1997. Liebing has often cited the Birmingham producers Female, Surgeon and Regis as major influences. The name spread to describe fast, loop-based hard techno across Europe; Liebing, who became known as the "godfather of schranz", has said he thinks the term was "highjacked by the Hardtechno scene". In the mid-2020s schranz underwent an international revival.

=== Cologne and Kompakt ===
In Cologne, Wolfgang Voigt, his brother Reinhard Voigt, Jörg Burger and Jürgen Paape opened the record shop Delirium in 1993, soon joined by Michael Mayer. Voigt's labels Profan and Studio 1 pioneered a reduced, loop-based style that made him one of the founders of minimal techno, and in 1998 the group launched the label and distributor Kompakt, whose sound became known as the "Sound of Cologne".

=== Berlin minimal in the 2000s ===
As the German rave boom lost momentum around 1998, a more restrained scene developed in Berlin that was dominated for roughly a decade by minimal techno and its house variants. Cheap rents and relatively easy visas drew international artists, among them Richie Hawtin, who set up a Berlin base for his M_nus label, and Ricardo Villalobos, whose move was seen as a turning point in the music. Clubs including Club der Visionäre, Watergate and Bar 25 became associated with the style, along with labels such as BPitch Control, Perlon and Mobilee, and low-cost airlines made the city a destination for visiting clubbers. By around 2008–2009 "minimal" had become, in the words of some participants, "a bad word". A new generation of producers from Detroit and North America, including Matthew Dear, Seth Troxler and Magda, also moved to Berlin in this period.

=== Berghain and Ostgut Ton ===
The club Ostgut, which grew out of the Snax fetish parties, opened in a former railway depot in the late 1990s and closed in 2003 to make way for an arena development; among the DJs who built careers there was Marcel Dettmann. Its owners reopened as Berghain, in a former power station, in 2004, and launched the label Ostgut Ton in 2005. Residents such as Dettmann and Ben Klock developed a sound that kept the volume and energy of hard techno but slowed it down; Klock said that 1990s techno records became "sexy" when played six or eight percent slower. Berghain became widely regarded as the world's most famous techno club, and its long sets, strict door and Ostgut Ton releases helped define the international image of "Berlin techno" in the 2000s and 2010s.

=== Dubstep crossover ===
From around 2007, artists from the British dubstep scene began to engage with Berlin techno. The Hotflush label head Paul Rose (Scuba) moved to Berlin in 2007, partly because of his interest in the city's techno and Berghain itself, and became friends with the dubstep fans working at Hard Wax. In July 2008 he and his agent Paul Fowler (previously founder of the Spymania label, launching the career of Squarepusher) launched Sub:Stance at Berghain, booking dubstep artists such as Martyn, Joker and The Bug alongside techno and house DJs. Resident Advisor later described the night as revolutionary for bringing dubstep into what was then "Berlin's temple of house and techno orthodoxy", and the programming of Sub:Stance and Berghain increasingly overlapped. Ostgut Ton released a Sub:Stance mix by Scuba in 2010, Berlin producers such as Marcel Dettmann remixed for Hotflush, and the residency ended in 2013.

Shed, whose first releases came out through Hard Wax from 2004 and whose first album on Ostgut Ton was the turning point in his career, was often grouped with Scuba, Martyn and other dubstep-influenced producers at the time. He recalled that "every techno DJ from Berlin" was then claiming an interest in dubstep, while describing his own love of early dubstep on Tempa and by Martyn, Appleblim and Shackleton, and said there were points where dubstep and techno were "really the same music".

=== Recognition ===
On 13 March 2024 "Techno Culture in Berlin" was added to Germany's national inventory of intangible cultural heritage, following a campaign by Rave The Planet, the organisation backed by Dr. Motte, that began in 2021.

== See also ==
- Techno
- Detroit techno
- German electronic music
- Music of Germany

== Bibliography ==
- Brewster, B.; Broughton, F. (2006). Last Night a DJ Saved My Life: The History of the Disc Jockey. Avalon Travel Publishing. ISBN 978-0802136886.
- Reynolds, S. (1999). Generation Ecstasy: Into the World of Techno and Rave Culture. New York: Routledge. ISBN 978-0415923736.
- Sicko, D. (1999). Techno Rebels: The Renegades of Electronic Funk. Billboard Books. ISBN 978-0823084289.
- Sicko, D. (2010). Techno Rebels: The Renegades of Electronic Funk (2nd ed.). Wayne State University Press. ISBN 978-0814334386.
