= Rouanet =

Rouanet is a French surname. Notable people with the surname include:

- Marie Rouanet (1936–2026), French singer and writer
- Pierre-Eugène Rouanet (1917–2012), French Roman Catholic bishop
- Sam Rouanet (born 1972), French musician and DJ
- Sérgio Paulo Rouanet (1934–2022), Brazilian diplomat, philosopher, essayist and scholar

== See also ==
- Rouanet Law, Brazilian law
