= Agent Cooper =

Agent Cooper may refer to:

- Dale Cooper, a character from American TV series, Twin Peaks
- Edward Cooper, a character from American TV series, Medium
- A recording alias of German electronic musician Lars Lewandowski
