= Tanith (DJ) =

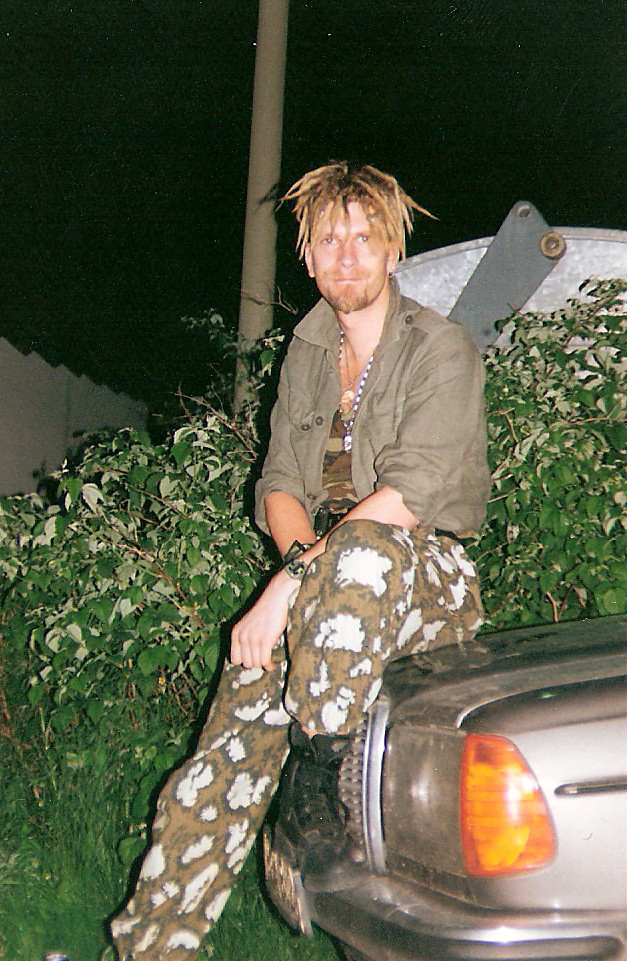
- Tanith after a show in the Inside-Club at Marktleugast

Background information
- Born: Thomas Andrezak; 4 August 1962 (age 63)
- Genres: Techno, acid house, electro house, breakbeat
- Occupations: DJ, producer, remixer
- Instruments: Turntables, sampler
- Years active: 1987-
- Labels: Low Spirit; Timing Recording
- Website: www.tanith.org

Thomas Andrezak (born 4 August 1962 in Bad Kreuznach), better known as Tanith, is a German DJ and producer of electronic dance music. From 1990 to 1996 he was one of the most popular German Tekkno DJs.

In 1987, Andrezak changed his name and moved from Wiesbaden to Berlin at the beginning of the Acid House scene. He was the resident DJ in Berlin's first Acid House club, the Ufo. In January 1990, he organized his own night session, the Cyberspace, at Ufo II. At that time, he also worked in the Mittwochsclub and was a resident DJ in many Tekknozid raves. Tanith was the first Tekkno DJ and is considered one of the founders of the techno culture in Germany.

In 1990, he wrote for the specialized magazine Front Page, and hosted regular after hour parties at the "Exit" club located in the old Ahornblatt building, after the Afterhour club "Walfisch" in Köpenicker Strasse closed.

When the Tresor club opened in March 1991, he became a resident DJ there. He was a main guest in almost all the major raves of his time (Mayday, Nature One, Tribal Gathering, etc.). In 1992, he devoted himself to the early breakbeat movement. His appearance at the 1994 Love Parade caused great sensation when he opened the parade on board of the "Love Truck", a parading car made with retired Russian tanks.

The following year, Tanith distanced himself from the Mayday raves and Low Spirit records, because he was unhappy with the way that he was treated as an artist at the Mayday parties. He closed this stage playing in his act with the prologue of the song "Haus der Lüge" (House of Lies) from Einstürzende Neubauten.

In 1997, Tanith and the breakbeat label Timing Recordings released two albums, T-A-N-I-T-H and Still. His camouflage look was a 1990s trademark in Germany.

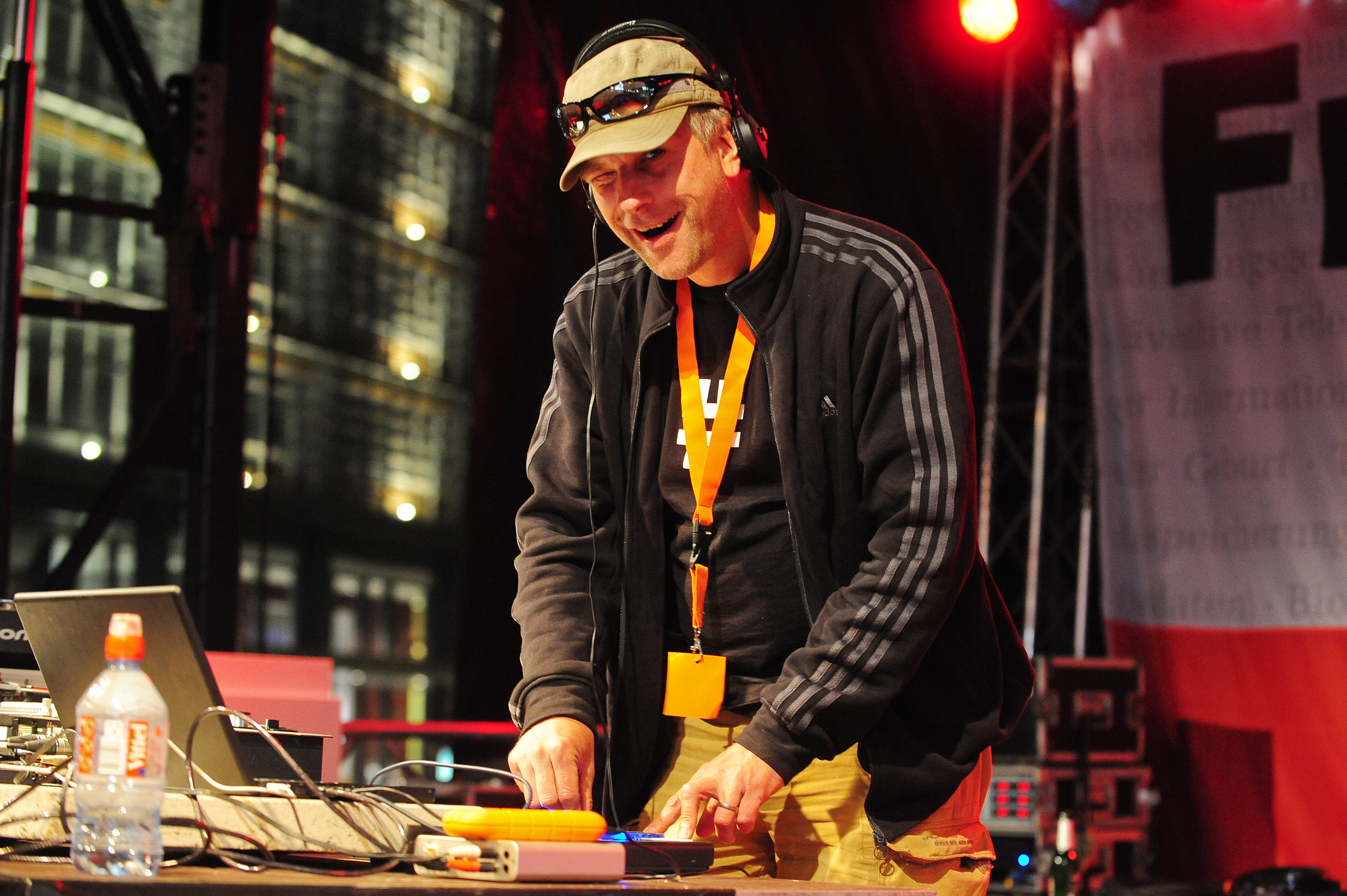
Tanith at the "Freiheit statt Angst" protest march

In September 2009, Tanith played at Freiheit statt Angst protest march on the car of the Pirate Party of Germany and then at the final rally.
