= Moopie =

Moopie is a DJ and record label owner, based in Melbourne, Australia.

He is the founder of 'a colourful storm', an Australian record-label.

== Early life ==
Moopie was born in Beijing, and grew up in Melbourne. His real name is Matthew Xue.

== Career ==
In 2016, Moopie began curating a record label named 'a colourful storm', the name of which originated from a mix series started earlier by two other local DJs. As a DJ, he has performed at Berlin Atonal. He was named as a 'breakthrough DJ' by Mixmag in 2023, and named on the 'Ones to Watch' list in 2024 by DJ Mag and BBC Radio 1.
