= False attribution =

Credit for a work given to the wrong person

False attribution may refer to:

- Misattribution in general, when a quotation or work is accidentally, traditionally, or based on bad information attributed to the wrong person or group.
- A specific fallacy where an advocate appeals to an irrelevant, unqualified, unidentified, biased, or fabricated source in support of an argument.

== Incorrect identification of source ==
One particular case of misattribution is the Matthew effect. A quotation is often attributed to someone more famous than the real author. This leads the quotation to be more famous, but the real author to be forgotten (see also: obliteration by incorporation and Churchillian Drift).

Such misattributions may originate as a sort of fallacious argument, if use of the quotation is meant to be persuasive, and attachment to a more famous person (whether intentionally or through misremembering) would lend it more authority.

In Jewish biblical studies, an entire group of falsely-attributed books is known as the pseudepigrapha.

== Fallacy ==
A fraudulent advocate may go so far as to fabricate a source in order to support a claim. For example, the "Levitt Institute" was a fake organisation created in 2009 solely for the purposes of (successfully) fooling the Australian media into reporting that Sydney was Australia’s most naive city.

Contextomy (quoting out of context) is a type of false attribution.

== See also ==
- Fake news
- Straw man
