= Champagne for my real friends, real pain for my sham friends =

Toast

"Champagne for my real friends, real pain for my sham friends" is a pun in the form of an antimetabole. It is recorded as a toast dating to at least the nineteenth century, though it is often mistakenly attributed to the Irish painter Francis Bacon (1909–1992) or the American musician Tom Waits (born 1949).

Other examples of its use include:

- "Mr. Jorrocks then called upon the company in succession for a toast, a song, or a sentiment. Nimrod gave, 'The Royal Staghounds'; Crane gave, 'Champagne to our real friends, and real pain to our sham friends.'" Jorrocks's Jaunts and Jollities (1838), ch. 12, by R. S. Surtees
- a line delivered as a toast by actor Russell Johnson from the 1961 TV series Thriller, season 1, episode 16, "The Hungry Glass", based on a story by Robert Bloch
- a line in Mike Cross's song "Dear Boss" on the 1985 album Solo at Midnight
- a repeated line in the song "This One's for You" by Therapy? on their 2001 album Shameless
- a line that Edward Norton's character says in the 2002 Spike Lee film 25th Hour.
- a line said by David Spade, in the 2003 film Dickie Roberts: Former Child Star
- the title of a song on the 2005 album From Under the Cork Tree by Fall Out Boy
- the title of a 2005 episode of One Tree Hill
- the title of a 2010 album by Alan Oldham
- a line said by the character Dave Rose in the show Happy Endings, 2011 episode "Dave of the Dead"
- a line said by the character Duke Crocker in the show Haven (TV series), 2011 episode "The Trial of Audrey Parker" s1e11.
- the chorus of Faderhead's 2014 song "Champagne and real pain"
- a bungled line in the song "Fake Champagne" by Seth Sentry on his 2015 album Strange New Past
- a line said by the character Marnie in the show Girls, season 5 episode 6 (2016)
- a line by JP and his brother Tomothy while drinking champagne in British TV show Fresh Meat series 4 episode 6 (2016)
- a line said by the character Connor Price in the prequel DLC to the videogame Lake (2023)
- a line said by the character Harley Quinn in the comic book Harley Quinn volume 3, issue #77

== See also ==
Quotations related to Love is the Devil: Study for a Portrait of Francis Bacon at Wikiquote
