= Churchillian Drift =

Misattribution of quotes to more famous speakers

Churchillian Drift is the term, coined by British writer Nigel Rees, which describes the widespread misattribution of quotes by obscure figures to more famous figures. The term connotes the particular egregiousness of misattributions to British prime minister Winston Churchill.

Rees identified George Bernard Shaw, Oscar Wilde and Mark Twain as other writers who often receive incorrect attributions.

== Selected examples ==
Quote	Origin	Misattribution	Ref
Don't talk to me about naval tradition. It's nothing but rum, sodomy, and the lash.	Resembles an ironic aphorism cited by Langworth from the Oxford Dictionary of Quotations as 19th-century English naval tradition, "Ashore it's wine, women and song; aboard it's rum, bum and concertina" or variously "... rum, bum and bacca [tobacco]".	Winston Churchill	
The heaviest cross I have to bear is the Cross of Lorraine.	This remark referring to Charles de Gaulle was actually made by General Edward Louis Spears, Churchill's personal representative to the Free French.	Winston Churchill	Quoted in Nigel Rees, Sayings of the Century p. 105.
Lady Nancy Astor: If I were your wife I'd put poison in your coffee. Churchill: If I were your husband I'd drink it.	Dates to 1899, American humor origin, originally featuring a woman upset by a man's cigar smoking. Cigar often removed in later versions, coffee added in 1900. Incorrectly attributed in Consuelo Vanderbilt Balsan, Glitter and Gold (1952).	Winston Churchill	"If you were my husband, I'd poison your coffee" (Nancy Astor to Churchill?), Barry Popik, The Big Apple, February 9, 2009; 19 November 1899, Gazette-Telegraph (CO), "Tales of the Town," p. 7; Churchill by Himself: The Definitive Collection of Quotations, by Richard Langworth, PublicAffairs, 2008, p. 578.; The Yale Book of Quotations, edited by Fred R. Shapiro, New Haven, Connecticut, Yale University Press, 2006, p. 155.; George Thayer, The Washington Post (April 27, 1971), p. B6.
If you're going through hell, keep going.	True origin unknown. Finest Hour described it as "not verifiable in any of the 50 million published words by and about him". A similar quotation: "If you're going through hell, don't stop!" is "plausibly attributed" to Oregon self-help author and counselor Douglas Bloch (1990), according to Quote Investigator.	Winston Churchill	
Success consists of going from failure to failure without loss of enthusiasm	Attribution debunked in Langworth's Churchill by Himself. The earliest close match located by the Quote Investigator is from the 1953 book How to Say a Few Words by David Guy Powers.	Winston Churchill	
Champagne for my real friends, real pain for my sham friends	Recorded as a toast dating to at least the nineteenth century.	Francis Bacon, Tom Waits	

== See also ==
- Stigler's law of eponymy
