= Dimitri Hegemann =

German nightclub owner and activist (born 1954)

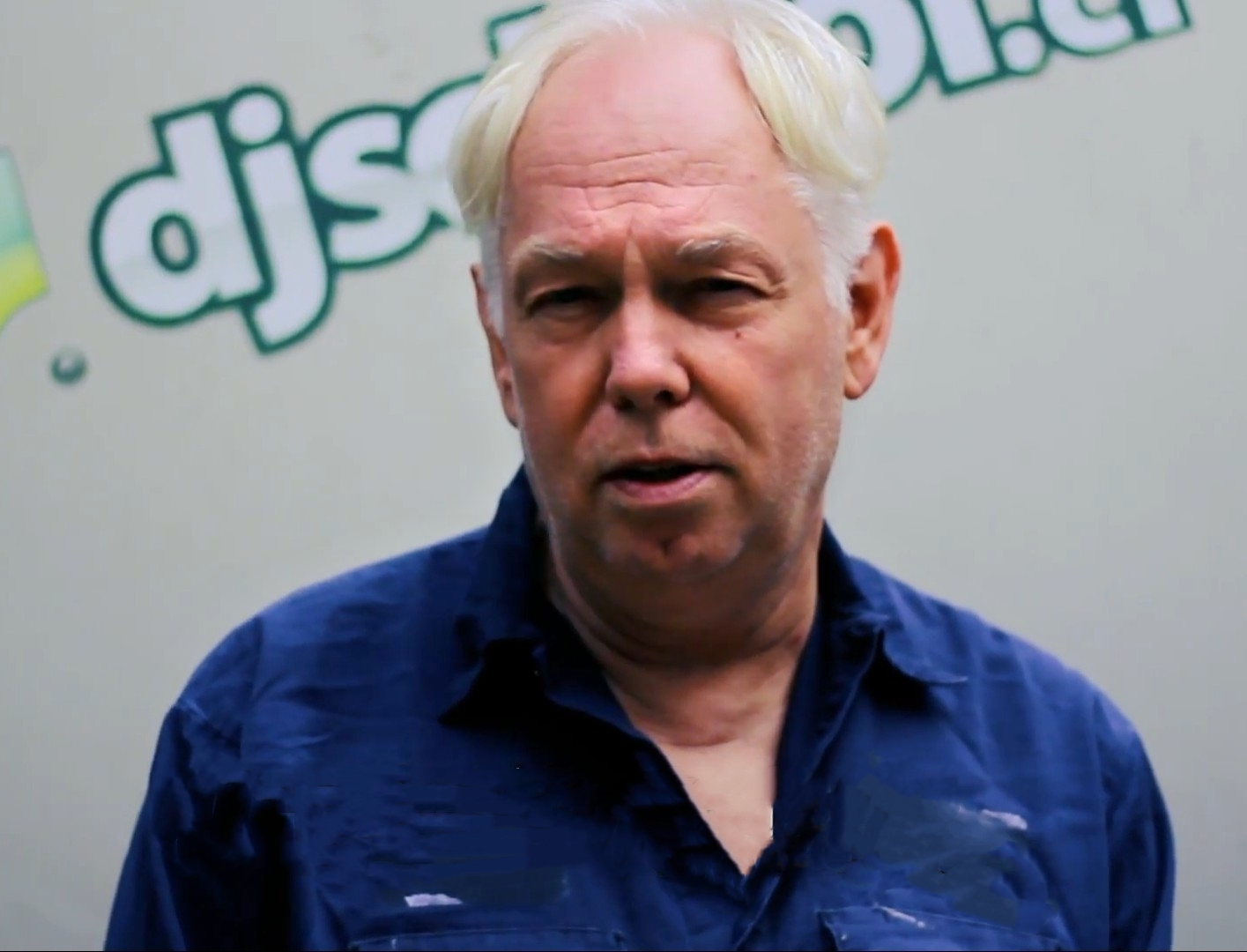
Dimitri Hegemann, 2016

Dietmar-Maria "Dimitri" Hegemann (born August 26, 1954) is a German nightclub owner, cultural activist and community organizer, currently living and working in Berlin, Germany.

== Early life and career ==
Dimitri Hegemann was born in Werl of Westfalia, West Germany on August 26, 1954. He moved to be part of the developing art, music and social scenes in West Berlin and began studying musicology in Münster, and after relocation, at the Free University Berlin in 1978. He played the bass in the locally known band "Leningrad Sandwich". Between 1982 and 1990, he organized five Berlin Atonal featuring groups like Malaria!, Einstürzende Neubauten, Test Dept, Laibach, Psychic TV and Die Haut.

In 1986, he opened a gallery in an old shoe store, which he called the Fischbüro, a name inspired by the Dadaist movement. In the gallery's basement in 1988 he opened the acid house club Ufo. Though the basement room had a ladder for access, and space for only 100 people, Ufo hosted the after-party celebration of the first Love Parade in 1989.

After the wall came down, Hegemann and his friends opened the techno club Tresor, which was located between the two infamous walls - in the heart of the reunited city. Tresor became the launchpad for a youth culture movement inspired by techno, the futuristic dance sound made in Detroit. A relationship between Hegemann and Detroit artists Mike Banks and Jeff Mills of Underground Resistance began and continues to this day.

In 2005, the council of Berlin sold the ground where Tresor was located to an insurance company and Tresor had to move out. In March 2007, Hegemann found a new home for the club in an abandoned power plant in the middle of Berlin. The new home is called Kraftwerk Berlin and features art, music, and cultural events across several genres.

== Current work ==
In 2015 Hegemann launched a community organization called Happy Locals, and another called the Academy for Subcultural Understanding. The Happy Locals is a group made up of Berlin-based organizations, which help make alternative projects happen. Since 2012, the Happy Locals have shared its experience and knowledge, finding collaborators and partners to plan creative projects for cities that need them.

The Happy Locals want to expand the project nationally and internationally. Hegemann considers himself a cultural activist and calls himself a "space" pioneer - aiming to turn industrial ruins into cultural spaces. Only restorative art, he says, can save old cities from vanishing into meaninglessness. His current project involves renovating industrial spaces in Detroit as part of a group called the Detroit-Berlin Connection. He wants to help the people of Detroit, with alternative, non-traditional projects using assets that already exist in the community: the people who live there and a multitude of still solid, but underused buildings.

Hegemann wants to encourage Detroiters by building a creative hub to help attract projects that combine art, music, technology with improving the quality of life in the city's neighborhoods.
