= Stewart Walker =

American musician

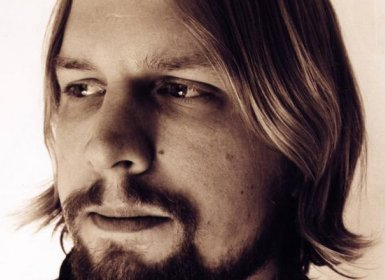

Stewart Walker (born 1974) is an American electronic music record producer, who lives and works in Berlin. Walker's forté is live performance, a rarity in the world of beat-driven electronic music, and he is known for contributing to the development of minimal techno with his 1999 album Stabiles.

After selling his guitar and abandoning "lead singer" ambitions in Athens, Georgia, in 1993, Walker started to assemble a studio. Starting with a synthesizer, a drum machine, and a guitar amplifier, he would work the filter knobs until the paint rubbed off, while dreaming of standing on stage in front of adoring fans and flashing lights. From such humble beginnings, Stewart stepped up his knowledge of synthesis, drum programming and mixing. His early techno enthusiasm expressed itself in a line of recordings which began with Detroit-based labels in 1997, leading eventually to larger projects with well-known European techno labels such as Minus, Tresor, and Mille Plateaux.

In 2001, he founded his first imprint Persona Records which released almost 50 EPs and albums by himself and other talents such as Touane, Reynold, and Andrea Sartori. Ten years later in 2011, Stewart founded Son of Cataclysm as an artistic reaction to the economic and human rights crises of our time.

Walker played at the re-opening of Berlin's Tresor club in 2007. His music occurs around 128 to 132 bpm, and is dense with many harmonic and percussive layers.

Walker's Concentricity was cited as "one of the standout long players of the year" on Resident Advisor in 2007.

Successes with Persona and other independent labels have brought Stewart's shows to worldwide audiences for 15 years. Stewart has been a fixture on the global club circuit. Always playing live original music, has endeared Stewart to fans who are looking for soul and wisdom in their entertainment. A step beyond the simplicity of hedonism and personal abandon, Stewart Walker has built a legacy as a techno musician who still believes in the sound of the future.

Stewart is currently working with fellow Berlin based musician Sam Rouanet on a new instrumental project called Sweetnighter.

== Selected discography ==
=== Albums ===
- Stabiles - Force Inc/Mille Plateaux (1999)
- Discord (2004)
- Live Extracts - Tresor (2002)
- Grounded in Existence - Persona (2004)
- Concentricity - Persona (2007)
- Artifacts of the pre-Apocalypse - Son of Cataclysm (2011)

=== EPs ===
2008 Powdered I Ching (EP) Persona Records
2007 Addict (12", EP) PulseWith Records
2007 Druid Hills (12", EP) Persona Records
2006 After This I'll Never Sleep (EP) Persona Records
2005 Spend the Day Frozen (12", EP) Persona Records
2005 Travel Plaza (12", EP) Persona Records
2002 Degenerate (EP) Persona Records
2002 M.O.R. Of The Same (EP) Persona Records
2001 Pleasure Island (EP) Persona Records
2001 Circular Valley Remixed (EP) Persona Records
2001 South Suburban (EP) (12", EP) Persona Records
2001 Jet Fuel And Longing (EP) Belief Systems
2000 Hurricane Weather (EP) Force Inc.
2000 Granular Synthesis (EP) Mille Plateaux
2000 Intervals (EP) M_nus
2000 Mobilization - Stabiles Remixes (EP) Tektite Recordings
2000 Reformation of Negative Space (EP) Tresor
2000 Recoil (EP) M_nus
1999 Descending To Zero (EP) HiPass
1999 Abstract Symbols Of Decadence (EP) Tektite Recordings
1999 Nevermore (12", EP) Force Inc.
1999 North (12", EP) Background
1999 Nothing Produces Stark Imagery (EP) Tresor
1998 Artificial Music For Artificial People (EP) Mosquito
1998 Stoic (EP) Matrix Records
1997 Amphetamine Sulphate (EP) Matrix Records
