= Berlin Atonal =

Annual music and art festival in Germany

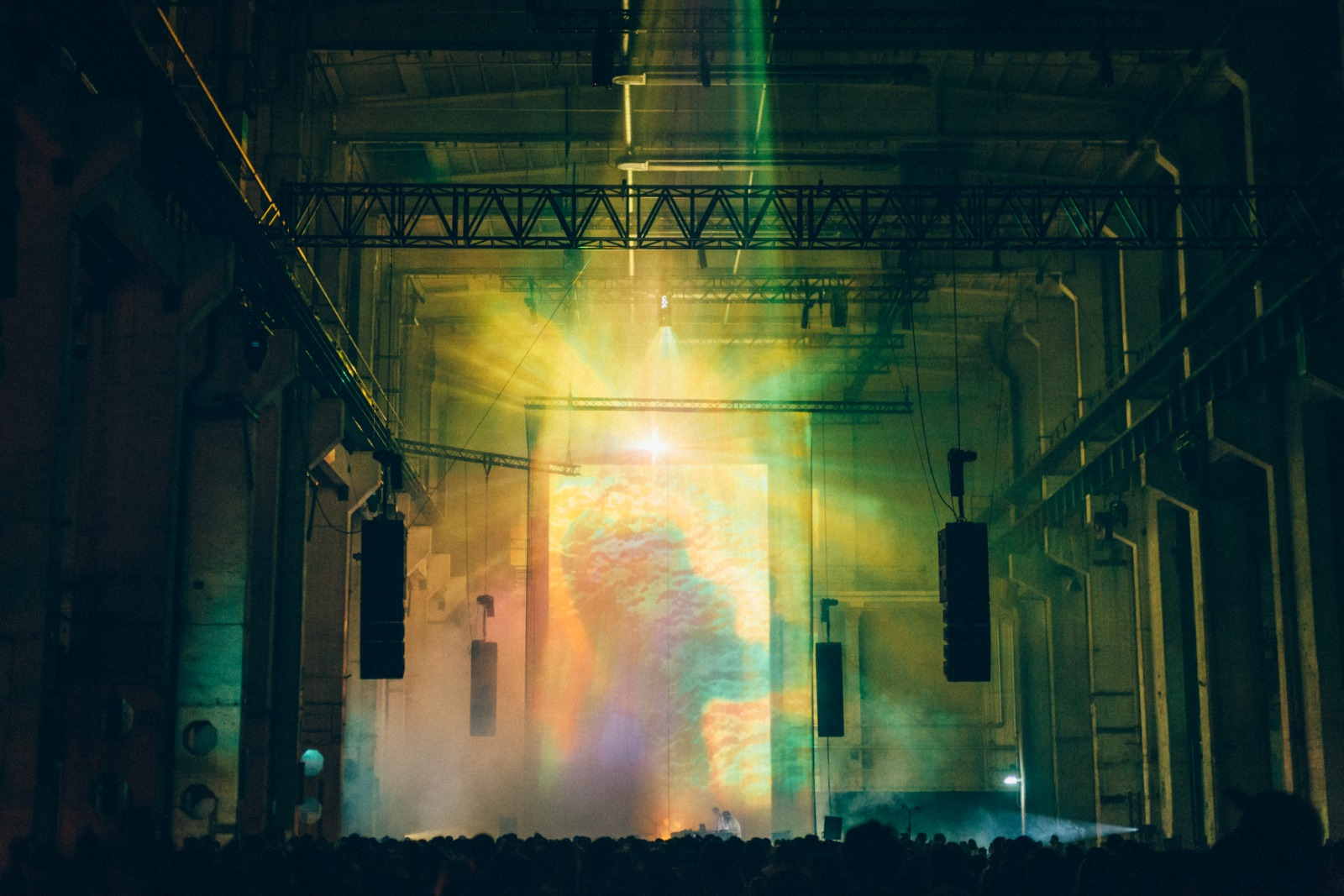
- Genre: Experimental music music festival arts festival art installation
- Locations: SO36 (1982–1990), Kraftwerk Berlin (2013–present)
- Years active: 1982–1990, 2013–present
- Website: www.berlin-atonal.com

Berlin Atonal is an annual festival for sonic and visual art. It first took place between 1982 and 1990, relaunching in 2013 under new direction and continuing to the present day. The festival presents contemporary, interdisciplinary projects at the intersection of sound art, visual and media art, installation and performance, with an emphasis on commissioned work and world premieres.

== Historical Period (1982 - 1990) ==
This phase of the festival began Kreuzberg in 1982 under the directorship of Dimitri Hegeman. Taking place primarily at SO36 in Kreuzberg, the early years of the festival fostered revolutionary and innovative musical acts such as Malaria!, Einstürzende Neubauten, Test Dept, Laibach, Psychic TV, 808 State, Die Haut among many others. Throughout the 1980s Berlin Atonal was at the vanguard of the progressive electronic and experimental music and art scenes, and worked to coalesce these emerging sounds in Berlin and worldwide into a more cohesive movement. The festival closed in 1990 as Dimitri Hegemann’s focus turned to founding the techno club Tresor.

== Modern Period ==
The modern era of Berlin Atonal began in 2013 under the leadership of Laurens von Oswald and Harry Glass. The main location for the festival is Kraftwerk Berlin, a massive former powerplant on the cusp of the Mitte and Kreuzberg areas of Berlin. Each edition of the festival sees hundreds of individual musicians, choreographers, sound and visual artists performing and presenting their work. The festival is now regarded as one of the most influential musical arts events in the world. Among the artists who have collaborated with the festival to make new work are: Actress, Caterina Barbieri, Glenn Branca, Wang Bing, Romeo Castellucci, Alessandro Cortini, Bruce Conner, Cabaret Voltaire, Clock DVA, Tony Conrad, Iancu Dumitrescu, VALIE EXPORT, Forensic Architecture, Marco Fusinato, Cyprien Gaillard, John Gerrard, Mick Harris, Jon Hassell, Florentina Holzinger, Ryoji Ikeda, Mark Lanegan, Alvin Lucier, Zhao Liang, Bridget Polk, Sandwell District, Lillian Schwartz, Shackleton, Deborah Stratman, Strawalde, Tino Sehgal, Wolfgang Tillmans, Mika Vainio, Chris Watson, Leslie Winer and Peter Zinovieff.

== Other Projects ==
The Long Now was a collaboration between Berlin Atonal and Berliner Festspiele, closing the ten-day MaerzMusik festival from 2015 until 2019. The project assembled concerts, performances, electronic live-acts, sound and video installations to form a composition in time and space over 30+ continuous hours. Laterne has a curated programme for Australian art museum MONA’s Dark Mofo festival since 2018. Parallax was a joint project between Berlin Atonal and Deutsches Symphonie-Orchester, with a programme of orchestral music from the baroque era to modern micropolyphony.

The exhibitions Metabolic Rift and Universal Metabolism, curated by Adriano Rosselli, were destined by Thomas Oberender to 'go down in history as events which changed Berlin'

== See also ==
- List of electronic music festivals
- List of industrial music festivals
- List of experimental music festivals
- Live electronic music
