= The Advent =

British electronic music act

- Origin: Portugal
- Genres: Electro, Acid techno, Detroit techno
- Years active: 1993–present
- Labels: Internal, FFRR, Tresor, International Deejay Gigolo, ELP Medien, Electrix, Golden Lake Productions
- Members: Cisco Ferreira
- Past members: Colin McBean

The Advent is a British electronic music act. It was founded in 1993 by Cisco Ferreira and Colin McBean. Soon after leaving school, Ferreira began working as an engineer at Jack Trax Records, a job which enabled him to glimpse first-hand the work of such artists as Derrick May and Marshall Jefferson. He began recording in 1988 with C.J. Bolland as Space Opera (eventually releasing four singles for R&S Records) and also recorded the first single for Fragile ("Why Don't You Answer" as himself) before meeting McBean, a top DJ who had worked with Keith Franklin of Bang the Party as the DJ team KCC.

== History ==
The pair began recording together in 1990; their first activity was an engineering job for Fade to Black (aka Jay Denham), but later they debuted on vinyl with their first single, recorded for inclusion on a sampler by Network Records. The official debut of The Advent came in 1994, just after Ferreira signed with Internal Records (also the home of Orbital). He convinced McBean to join him in the recording of a series of crucially limited singles, then the debut album Elements of Life in late 1995. Critics championed the duo's energetic update of original techno renegades like Derrick May and Kevin Saunderson, and The Advent followed with the remix album Shaded Elementz one year later. Their second full album New Beginning was released 28 April 1997, though Internal Records dropped the duo soon after its release. After transferring to the Metalbox division of Northwest/BMG, The Advent returned later that year with another remix album titled Kombination Phunk, which alternated remixes with several original productions.

In 1999, McBean left the group prior to the album Time Trap Technik, citing his reluctance to continue touring, though he continued to record under his solo alias Mr. G. Ferreira continued his busy release schedule, including a 12" series (Sound Sketchez) for Tresor during 1998–2000, and the 2002 double CD Sketched for Life. He also produced some more dancefloor oriented material under his alias G Flame, previously used together with Colin McBean under the alias G Flame & Mr. G on Phoenix G Records and Metalbox Records, while they were still together as The Advent.

== Discography ==
=== Studio albums ===
Year	Album	Label
October, 1995	Elements of Life	Internal
28 April 1997	New Beginning	FFRR
2000	Time Trap Technik	International Deejay Gigolo
1 October 2002	Sketched for Life	Tresor
17 March 2003	The Recreation	ELP Medien
17 February 2004	Light Years Away	Electrix
12 July 2005	T.R.I.N.I.T.Y.	Tresor
14 November 2019	Shadows	Mord
2 September 2020	Klockworks 30	Klockworks
