= Sam Rouanet =

French guitarist & DJ (born 1972)

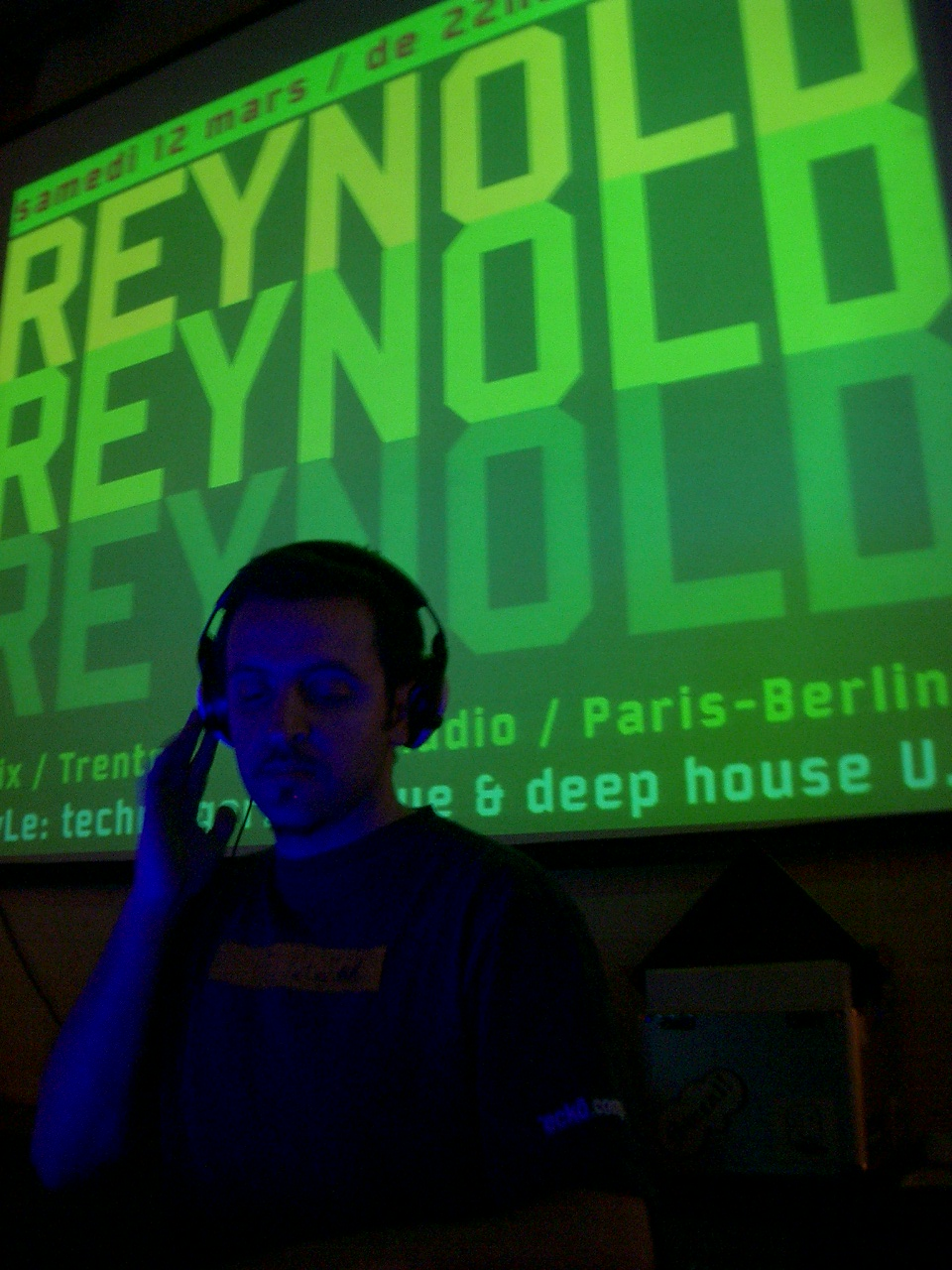
- Sam playing as Reynold at the Lieu Unique in Nantes, France

Background information
- Also known as: Reynold, Babyreynold, Johnny Wagner
- Born: Samuel Rouanet; 15 November 1972 (age 53); Toulouse, France
- Genre: Techno
- Occupations: Musician
- Instruments: Guitar, Keyboards, Turntables
- Years active: 1994-present
- Label: Trenton Records
- Website: Sam Rouanet

Sam Rouanet (born 15 November 1972 in Toulouse, France) is a French-born guitarist, DJ and producer of electronic music who lives and works in Berlin, Germany.

== Career ==
Sam Rouanet studied violin and classical music in Toulouse, France. He moved to Chicago in the late 1990s and began to play guitar in bands within the post-rock scene there. After returning to Europe, Sam started producing electronic music, mostly under the alias Reynold. First, he moved to London playing bass with the electronic duo Kinobe, before moving to Paris where he co-founded the Minimal Dancin' event where artists such as Swayzak, Metro Area, T. Raumschmiere, Roman Flügel of the duo Alter Ego, Feadz, Trentemøller, Aril Brikha, Booka Shade among many others. After success in Paris, Sam finally moved to Berlin to explore the electronic scene there.

He has released records for such labels as Persona, Plexi, KINA, Treibstoff and his own label, Trenton Records. Reynold's music has been well reviewed by international publications such as Resident Advisor and De:Bug.

In 2003 Sam co-created the electronic music label Trenton Records, which has since released over 50 records from artists such as John Tejada, Stewart Walker, Jeff Samuel, 3 Channels and Touane among others.

He has been the host of the monthly "Minimal Dancin" events at the Nouveau Casino in Paris, France, between 2001 and 2009 alongside Duplex 100 partner Phil Stumpf.

In 2010, Rouanet worked with Kazakh electronic musicians, in a project sponsored by the French Embassy in Kazakhstan and the Goethe-Institut, in creating a collaborative album entitled "Tronicstan". He later toured with some of the Kazakh participants around France and Germany.

In 2011 Sam Rouanet also released an album CD with his father Jacques Rouanet as a project called "Kigo". Sam is also collaborating on a number of live band projects with like-minded artists including “Spleen Underground Music”, “brome” or American electronic music producer Stewart Walker with whom he shares the “Ivory Tower Studio” in Berlin.

== Releases ==
2015 S.U.M. Salt & Pepper, Flumo Recordings
2014 S.U.M, Ye Ole EP, Trenton Records
2014 Reynold & Phil Stumpf, On The Move, Souvenir
2013 S.U.M. Love & Happiness, Dirt Crew Rec
2013 Spleen Live, Fusionary Part1, Back To The Balearics
2013 S.U.M, Spleen Underground Music, Trenton Records
2012 Reynold, The Rain, Trenton
2012 Reynold, Bring it on, Liquid Garden, part.2, Eintakt
2012 Giovanni Verga & Reynold, Into the Bone, Sirus Pandi2012 Le Projet Minsk, album/CD, Trenton
2011 Gelmatica, Craft, Subtraction
2011 KIGO “Princesse”, Subtraction
2010 Reynold, Tempura EP, High Jack
2010 Tronicstan album/CD, Trenton
2010 Reynold, Un Air de Gondole, KINA
2010 Reynold, To Know You EP, Trenton
2009 Reynold, Cococurry EP, Plexi records
2009 The Seasons, Undone, CD album, City Centre Office
2008 Reynold, Another Way EP, Persona Express 002
2008 Reynold, Faze part. 2, Trenton
2008 Reynold, Faze part.1, Trenton
2008 Reynold & 3 Channels, Macho Lato, Trenton
2007 Reynold / Aki Latvamaki: split EP, Curle 08
2007 Reynold Vs Aspro: god is given, Microfon 10
2007 Reynold: the leisure hive EP, Fragmented audio 01
2007 Reynold Vs Aspro: musique basique, Lebensfreude
2007 Reynold / Denis Karimani: split EP, Curle 05
2007 Reynold: La cité d’en haut EP, Persona
2006 Johnny Wagner: intercity EP, Trenton
2006 Reynold: my favorite movie CD/album, Persona
2006 Reynold Vs Aspro: U-turn, Microfon 06
2006 Rerynold: blue print EP, Body talk
2006 Reynold / Denis Karimani: split EP, Curle 02
2006 Reynold: montrose place EP, MA citysport
2006 Duplex 100: flashcam EP, Cray1Labworks
2006 Reynold: tropical storm EP, Baystreet rec
2006 Reynold: planet vinea EP, S'hort records
2006 Reynold: food for thought EP, Out of orbit
2006 Reynold Vs Phil Stumpf: for house, Sushitech
2006 Reynold Vs Aspro: angle & curve, trenton
2005 Duplex100: this is crime EP, MA
2005 Duplex100: Well hung EP, 3rd floor
2005 Reynold: playfool EP, MA citysport
2005 Duplex 100: Big shot EP, Treibstoff
2005 Reynold: mathmos, compil. Highgrade
2005 Duplex 100: 12", Initial Cuts
2005 Duplex 100: Duplexity EP, Morris/audio
2005 Reynold: 12", Morris/audio city sport
2004 Reynold: web EP, electro chelou
2004 Duplex 100: Extrapoliert EP, Initial cuts
2004 Duplex 100: Bipolar EP, Treibstoff
2004 Reynold: Winnemark EP, Morris | Audio
2004 Duplex 100: 1 track on Regular compil.
2004 Duplex 100: shooting star EP, Onitor
2004 Reynold: split EP 12", Trenton 002
2003 Reynold: a side split EP, 12" Trenton 001
2003 Reynold: Mystic, "Paris Lounge vol3
2003 Reynold: Tomy is Dancin' 12", Dumb-Unit
2003 Babyreynold: Compil "Artificiel", musiques modernes
2003 Canvas: Naked 12", Nacopa'jaz (rmx by Modernist)
2003 Canvas: Buona Modulazione LP/CD, Nacopa'jaz
2003 Duplex100: Rue Rouvet 12", Popular Tools
2003 Duplex100: popular internationalist #1
2003 Canvas: Origine J 12", Nacopa'jaz
2002 Crapule12" Indestructible/La Ink
2002 Canvas. Duplex 100: O'range, Serial
1999 12", Inkorporation 01
