= Pacou =

German techno music producer (born 1972)

Pacou

Pacou is a German techno music producer. He has released albums and EPs on his own label, LL Records, as well as on the Berlin-based Tresor label, Djax-Up-Beats, Konsequent, and Music Man Records. He records under the monikers Pacou and Agent Cooper.

Pacou was born in 1972 in Berlin, Germany. Starting out as a hobby, he became a record collector. In 1993 he bought the first music equipment. Three years on, he produced, and then released the first records under the name Agent Cooper (on the label Raw Music) and Pacou (on Tresor Records). 1997, Tresor released Pacou's first longplay album "Symbolic Language", and he became a resident DJ at the club. The year 1998 marked a substantial progress in both DJ and production aspects of his work. He started playing DJ sets around Europe, Japan and Australia, and changed over to full-time work on music and performing as DJ. The main release was the experimental techno style LP No Computer Involved on Tresor (a statement against simplified preset rhythm software such as Ejay Music Maker which were marketed as tools to create electronic music at home). In September 1998 Pacou founded his first own label LL Records. 1999 saw the continuation of work, a 12" single called A Universal Movement on Tresor, and continued travels and showcases around the globe. Remixes for Ben Sims and Access 58 from UK were also done at the time. Another LP State of Mind was released on Tresor in March 2000; furthermore 4 vinyl singles on the famous Dutch label Djax-Up-Beats. The website "www.pacou.com" was started in mid-2000. Musical projects for 2001 included releases on the German Konsequent imprint (album and singles), the "Music Man and Djax record labels. 2003 he continued work on Music Man label series Rio Sketches, and starting a new live music / performance project "Autofokus", which released three vinyl singles in 2004 and 2005. Tresor released another single Last Man Standing in February 2004 and a whole album The Berlin Sessions produced with Juan Atkins in 2005. His newest project Cache Records was started in May 2005.
