= Bam Bam (band) =

American house and acid house artist

Chris Westbrook a.k.a BamBam
- Origin: United States
- Genres: House Music
- Label: Westbrook Records (USA)
- Members: Chris Westbrook a.k.a "Bam Bam"

Chris Westbrook, better known by his stage name Bam Bam, is a Chicago house music and acid house artist, producer and multi-instrumentalist.

== Biography ==
BamBam's 1988 single "Give It to Me" reached No. 65 on the UK Singles Chart. It was released on Westbrook Records and licensed to Serious records in London (UK).

Bam Bam went on to release several more records and remixes, and samples of their work appeared on many other tracks.
