= Alan Oldham =

American techno musician and artist

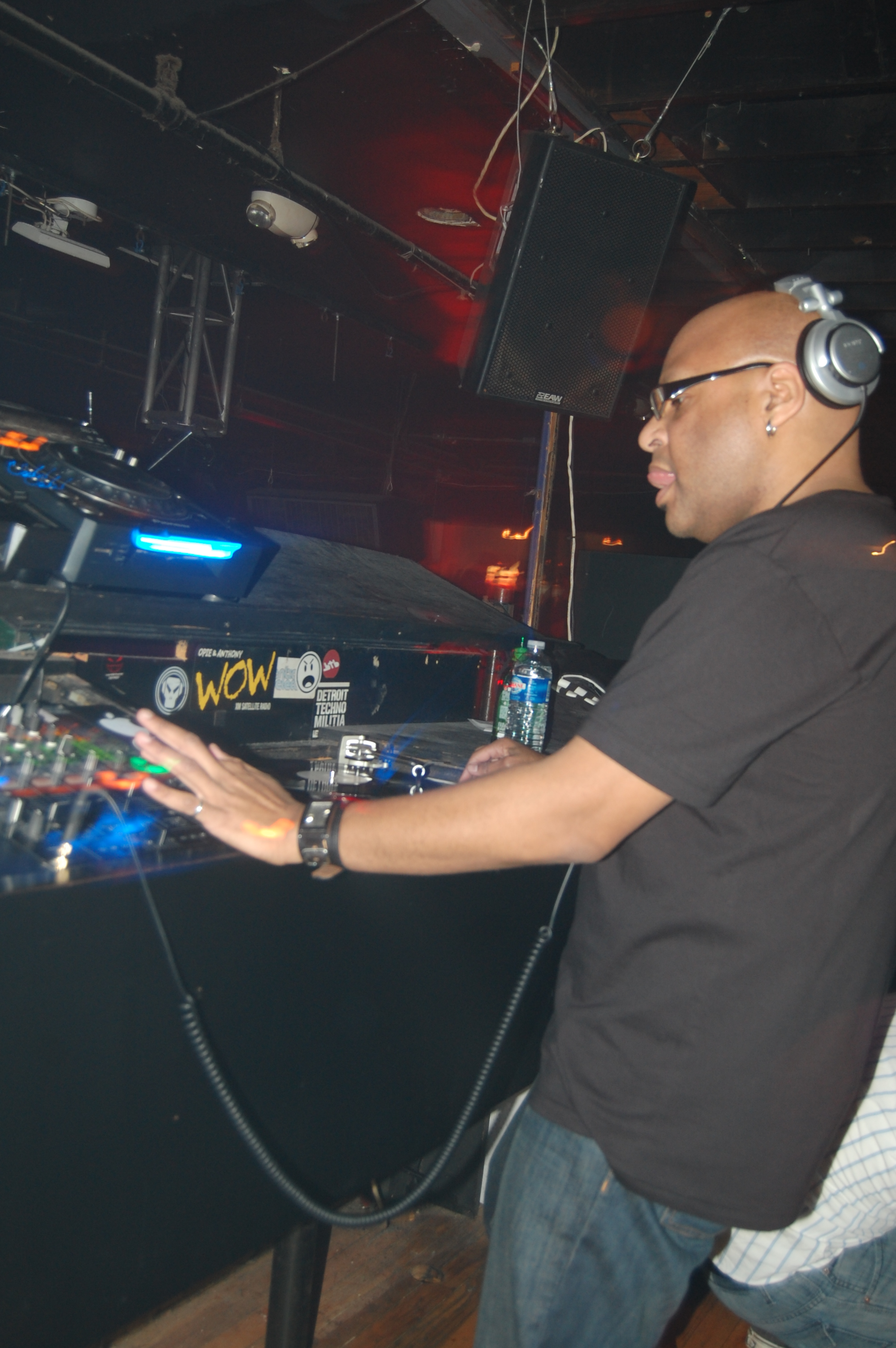
Alan Oldham in 2010

Alan D. Oldham (born c. 1963) sometimes performing as DJ T-1000, is an American techno DJ, producer, label owner, graphic artist, and painter.

== Career ==
Alan D. Oldham was born around 1963. From 1987 to 1992, he hosted Fast Forward on WDET-FM, Detroit's NPR affiliate. He played techno and industrial as well as hip hop and punk. He got the job as a college internship.

Derrick May asked Oldham to produce art for "Nude Photo", a single May released as "Rhythim Is Rhythim" in 1987. Oldham also drew the comic strip Danger Girl for Muzik.

In 1990, Oldham's creative association with Netherlands-based Djax Records began with his Signal-To-Noise Ratio music project being signed by the label, along with his first label art to appear on Djax. Oldham went on to produce hundreds of art pieces for Djax that appeared as label art, slipmats, calendars, posters, T-shirts, album covers, CD booklets, and four Miss Djax promotional comics released over the years. In 1992, after Jeff Mills' departure from the electronic group he co-created, Underground Resistance, Oldham, who had been serving in the office as UR's "Minister of Information," was tapped to join the group on its Australian Tour as the band's new DJ. All UR members had code-names, so DJ T-1000, named after the liquid-metal cyborg in the film T2 was born.

== Labels ==
After the success of UR's Australian Tour, Oldham was approached by leader Mike Banks to create a new label to run through a pressing and distribution business he was starting, called Submerge. The label Oldham would launch was called Generator. In 1996, Oldham began his own Pure Sonik imprint, a label solely for his output at DJ T-1000. And in 1997, Oldham signed with Tresor Records to release the "Jetset Lovelife" EP, followed by his debut album, Progress. Oldham's music has also appeared on React, Inzec, Astralwerks, xfive., Theory, Third Ear, Minimalsoul, and Nachstrom Schallplatten (a collaboration with Alexander Kowalski a.k.a. d_func).

== Art ==
Oldham created the comic characters "Johnny Gambit" and "Vectra: Black Girl from the Future". He has shown art in galleries and shops in Paris, Los Angeles, Berlin, Amsterdam, and Barcelona, and has participated in the Berlin art markets Comics Invasion and Signs of Dexterity. His full gallery debut in Vienna is planned for 2015.

== Selected discography ==
=== Albums ===
- Enginefloatreactor, Generator, 1995
- Progress, Tresor Berlin, 1999 (as DJ T-1000)
- Neutra, Pure Sonik Records, 2002 (as DJ T-1000)
- Johnny Gambit 01: The Prodigal Son Original Soundtrack/Graphic Novel, Pure Sonik Records, 2009 (as DJ T-1000)
- Champagne For My Real Friends, Real Pain For My Sham Friends, xfive., 2010 (as The Inside in collaboration with James Vanaria and Jane Zabeth)
- Famous For Fifteen Minutes, Pure Sonik Records, 2026 (as The Black Warhols)

=== Singles and EPs ===
- Liquid Metal Meltdown, Generator, 1993 (as DJ T-1000)
- Nikita, Generator, 1993 (as Level A & DJ T-1000)
- Liquid Metal Monster, Generator, 1995 (as DJ T-1000)
- Jetset Lovelife EP, Tresor Berlin, 1997 (as DJ T-1000)
- Minimal Science, Pure Sonik Records, 1997 (as DJ T-1000)
- Downshifter EP, Pure Sonik Records, 1997 (as DJ T-1000)
- Thesis EP, Pure Sonik Records, 1997 (as DJ T-1000)
- Thesis Part Two (w/ K-Hand Remix), Pure Sonik Records, 1997 (as DJ T-1000)
- Track Machine, Pure Sonik Records, 1998 (as DJ T-1000)
- Signals and Minimalism EP, Pure Sonik Records, 1998 (as DJ T-1000)
- Codes and Structures Vol. 1, Pure Sonik Records, 1999 (as DJ T-1000)
- Codes and Structures Vol. 2, Pure Sonik Records, 1999 (as DJ T-1000)
- Hyper-Stylized Life, Pure Sonik Records (PURE15), 2001(as DJ T-1000)
- Ladies and Gentlemen, We Are Now Invisible, Pure Sonik Records (PURE16), 2001 (as DJ T-1000)
- Neutra EP, Inzec, 2002 (as DJ T-1000)
- Neutra EP, Pure Sonik Records, 2002 (as DJ T-1000)
- Bout to Bang It Remixes, Inzec, (Inzec 014), 2003 (as DJ T-1000)
- Blaster EP, Pure Sonik Records (PURE19), 2009 (as DJ T-1000)
- Signal Boxx EP, Pure Sonik Records, 2014 (as DJ T-1000)
- Synapses b/w Microaggression, (Bandcamp Exclusive), Pure Sonik Records, 2014 (as DJ T-1000)
- d_func vs. DJ T-1000, Terminator EP, Nachstrom Schallplatten (NST093), 2014 (in collaboration with Alexander Kowalski)
- Drums and Weapons, Pure Sonik Records, 2012 (as DJ T-1000)

=== Compilations ===
- Detroit: Beyond the Third Wave, Astralwerks, 1995
- A Pure Sonik Evening, Pure Sonik Records, 1998
- Tresor: Annex 2, Tresor Berlin, 1999
- Tresor Compilation Vol. 13: It's Not Over, Tresor Berlin, 2005
- The Art of Transformation, xfive., 2006 (as Alan D. Oldham)
- Vintage Synth Technique, Minimalsoul Recordings, 2008
- Generator: Broadcast in Hi-Tech, Generator, 2010
- The Box Vol. 3, Theory Records, 2011
- Sub-Berlin: The Story of Tresor, Tresor Berlin, 2012
- Detroit Beatdown Vol. 2: The Final EP, 2014

=== Mixes ===
- Sabotage: Live in Belgium, X-Sight/Brooklyn Music, 1998
- This Is Pure Sonik Records: Mixed by DJ T-1000, Pure Sonik Records, 2013

=== Remixes ===
- Nigel Richards, Alaskan Bear Attack (DJ T-1000 Gets Funky Remix), 611 Records, 2013
- Little Nobody, Behind the Meme Claw (DJ T-1000's Drums and Weapons Remake), IF? Records, 2013

=== Awards ===
- Detroit Metro Times Music Award for Best Single, 1990
- Real Detroit 20/20 Award, 2003

== Works cited ==
- All Music Guide to Electronica: The Definitive Guide to Electronic Music. All Media Guide; Backbeat Books. 2001. ISBN 0-87930-628-9. OCLC 46456357.
- Sicko, Dan (1999). Techno Rebels: The Renegades of Electronic Funk. Billboard Books. ISBN 0-8230-8428-0. OCLC 40675151.
- Shapiro, Peter, ed. (2000). Modulations: A History of Electronic Music: Throbbing Words on Sound. New York: Caipirinha Productions. ISBN 1-891024-06-X. OCLC 45218394.
