= Tresor (club) =

Techno club in Berlin, Germany

Coordinates: 52°30′36″N 13°22′58″E

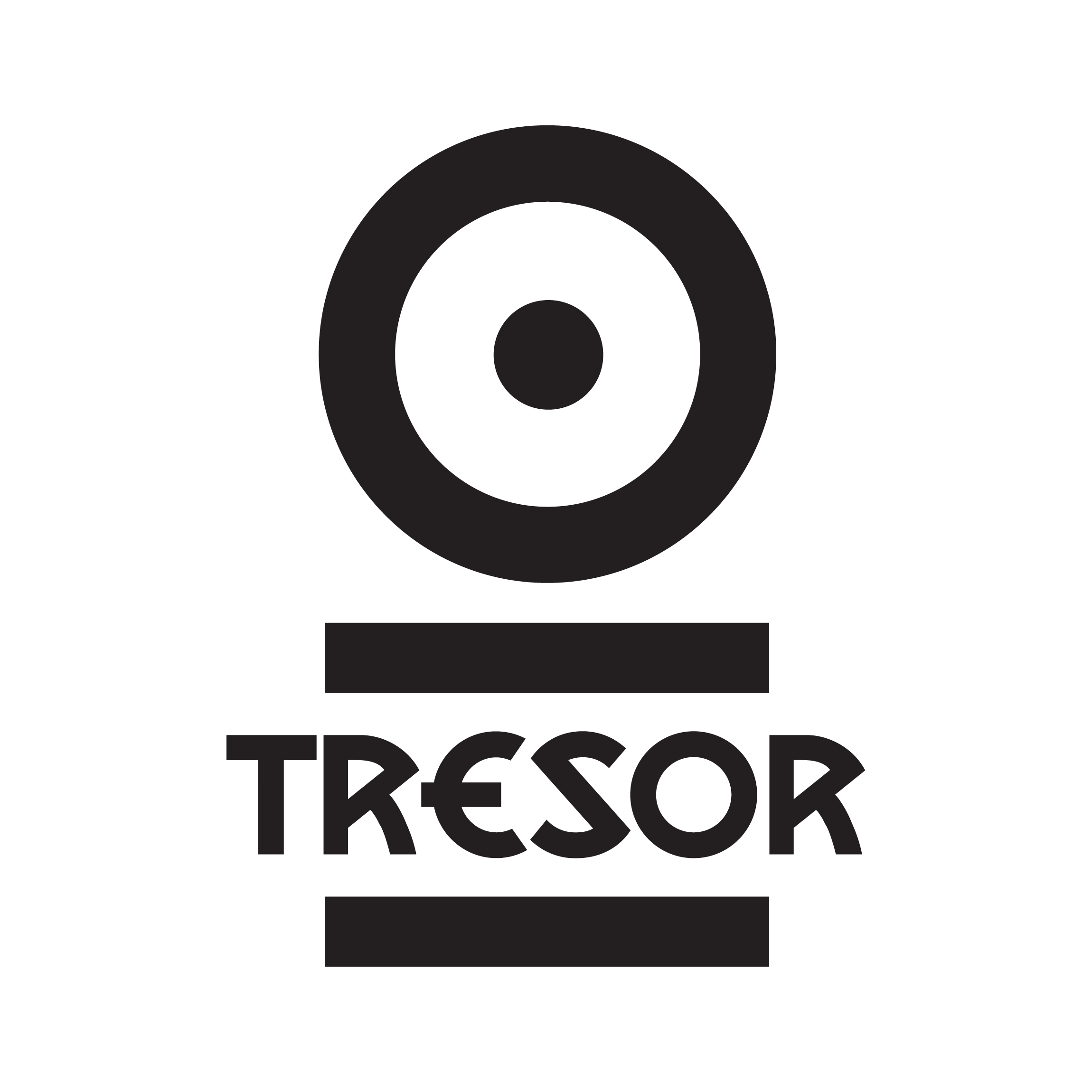
Tresor nightclub and record label logo (used 1991–1995 and again since 2015)

Tresor (German for safe or vault) is a techno nightclub in Berlin and a record label.

== History ==
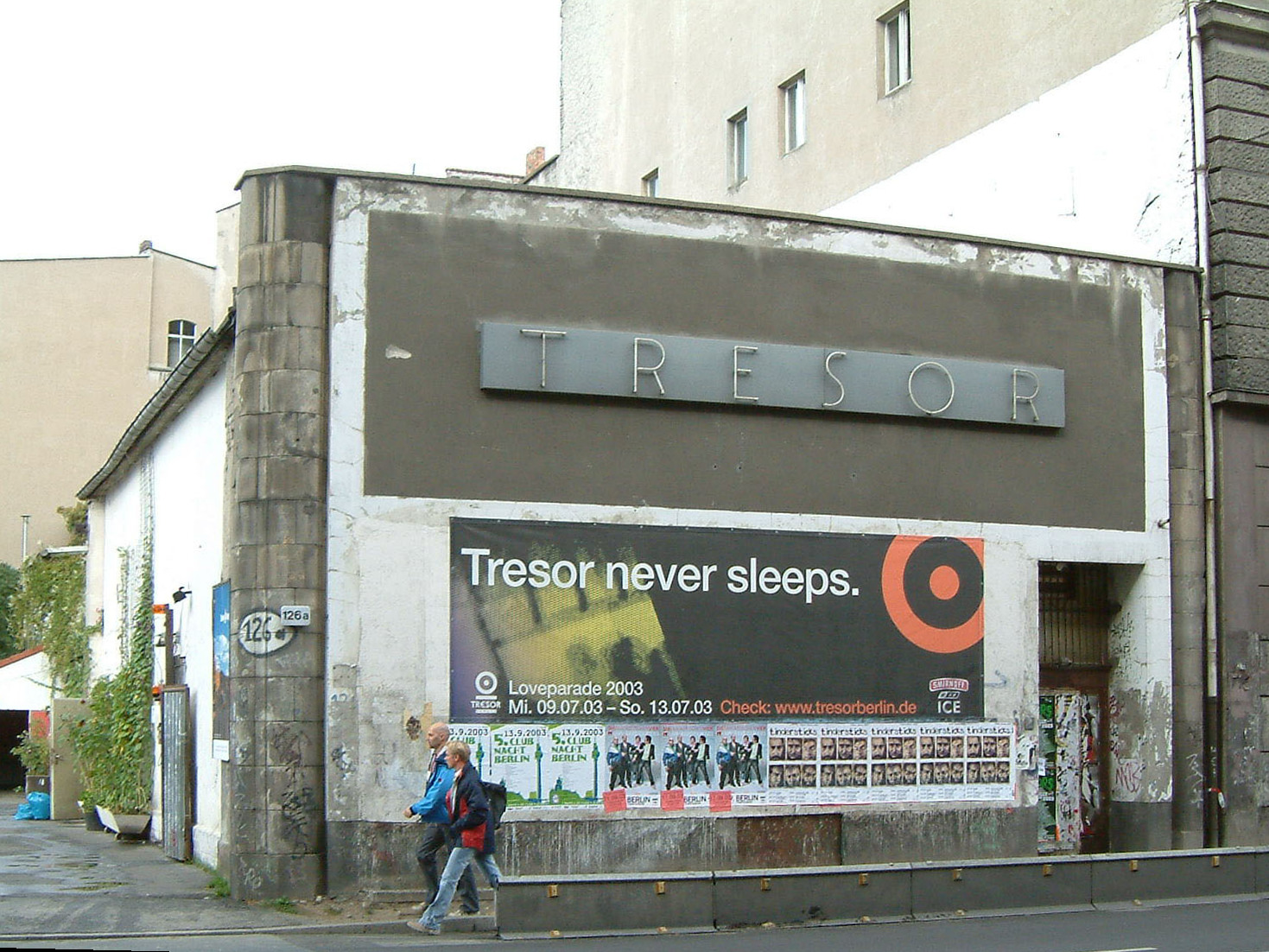
Original location in Leipziger Straße (2003)

The club was founded in March 1991 in the vaults of the former department store Wertheim at Leipziger Strasse 126-128 in Mitte, the central part of East Berlin, next to the Potsdamer Platz. The history of the club goes back to 1988 when the electronic music label Interfisch opened the Ufo Club in Berlin. Ufo was the original centre of Berlin house and techno, but due to financial problems that club closed in 1990.

After Ufo closed, Interfisch's head, Dimitri Hegemann, and some investors in the club found the new space in East Berlin. This was advantageous timing, as it was only a few months before Germany unified. The vaults under the Wertheim department store proved to be a suitable location. Tresor continued to be a popular club, having expanded and reconstructed continuously several times to include an outdoor garden area, and a second "Globus" floor. The Tresor floor in the basement was reserved specifically for hard techno, industrial and acid music, while Globus was featured mainly more mellow house sound. The record label Tresor Records was founded soon after the club first opened, in October 1991. Featured artists on the label include Jeff Mills, Blake Baxter, Juan Atkins, Robert Hood, Drexciya, Stewart Walker, Joey Beltram, Surgeon, Pacou, Cristian Vogel and many others.

In 2004 the documentary "Tresor Berlin: The Vault & the Electronic Frontier" was released. Directed by Mike Andrawis, it features interviews with Hegemann, Carola Stoiber, and DJs & artists associated with the club & label. The film covers the period from Hegemann's involvement with the Fishladen and UFO clubs in Berlin-Kreuzberg to the final months prior to Tresor's closure.

Tresor closed on 16 April 2005, after several years' prolonged short-term rent. The city sold the land to an investor group to build offices on the Leipziger Straße location. It was open for each night of April 2005, with the final event starting the Saturday night with queues stretching all the way down the road, and still going Monday morning.

Tresor reopened on 24 May 2007 in the decommissioned southern tract of the combined heat and power plant Heizkraftwerk Berlin-Mitte in Köpenicker Straße.

Since November 2019 the club has a subsidiary in the city of Dortmund called Tresor.West.

In September 2022, Tresor published a photobook, Tresor: True Stories, to document the past 30 years of its history.

== Label discography ==
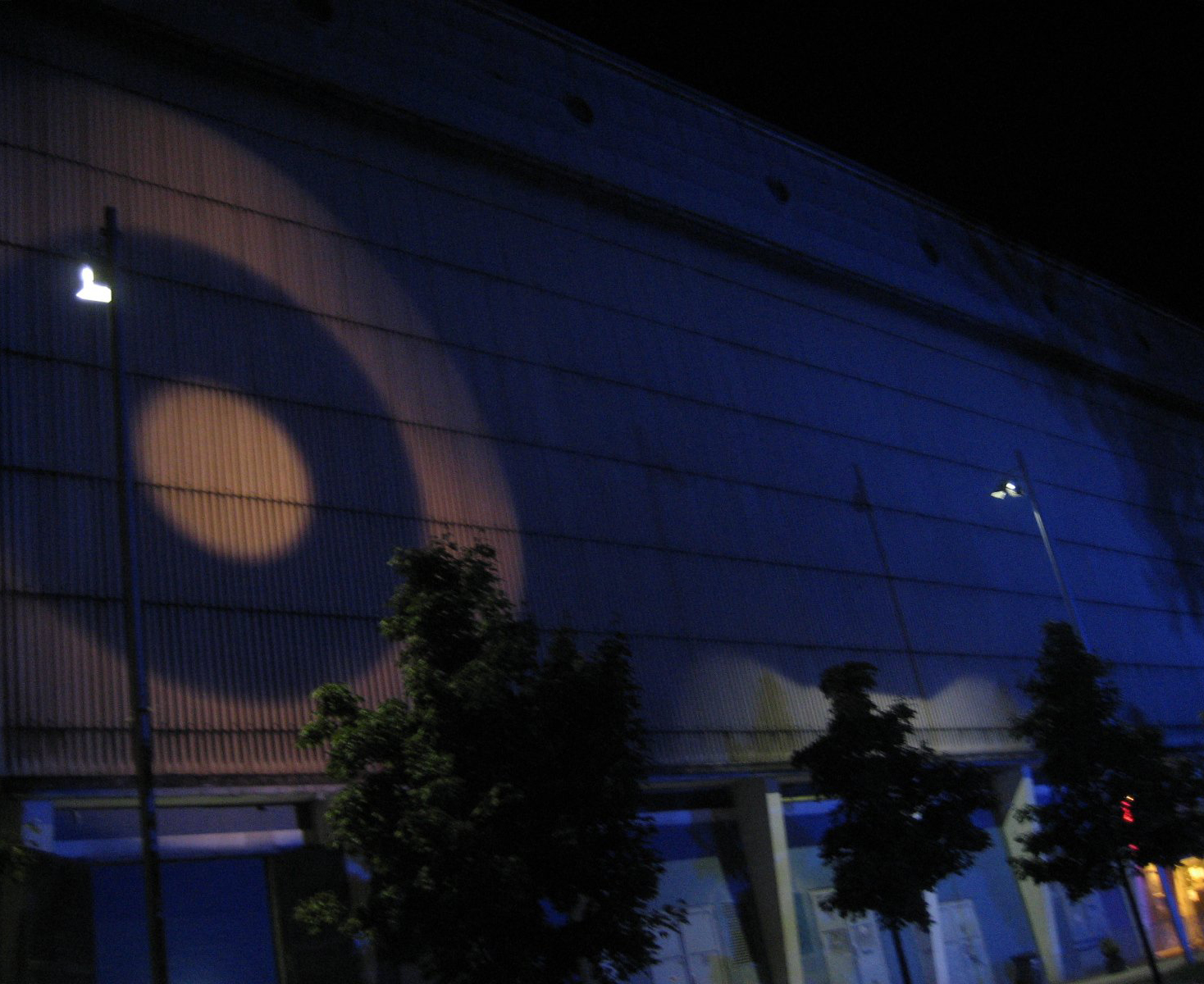
New location in Köpenicker Straße (2008)

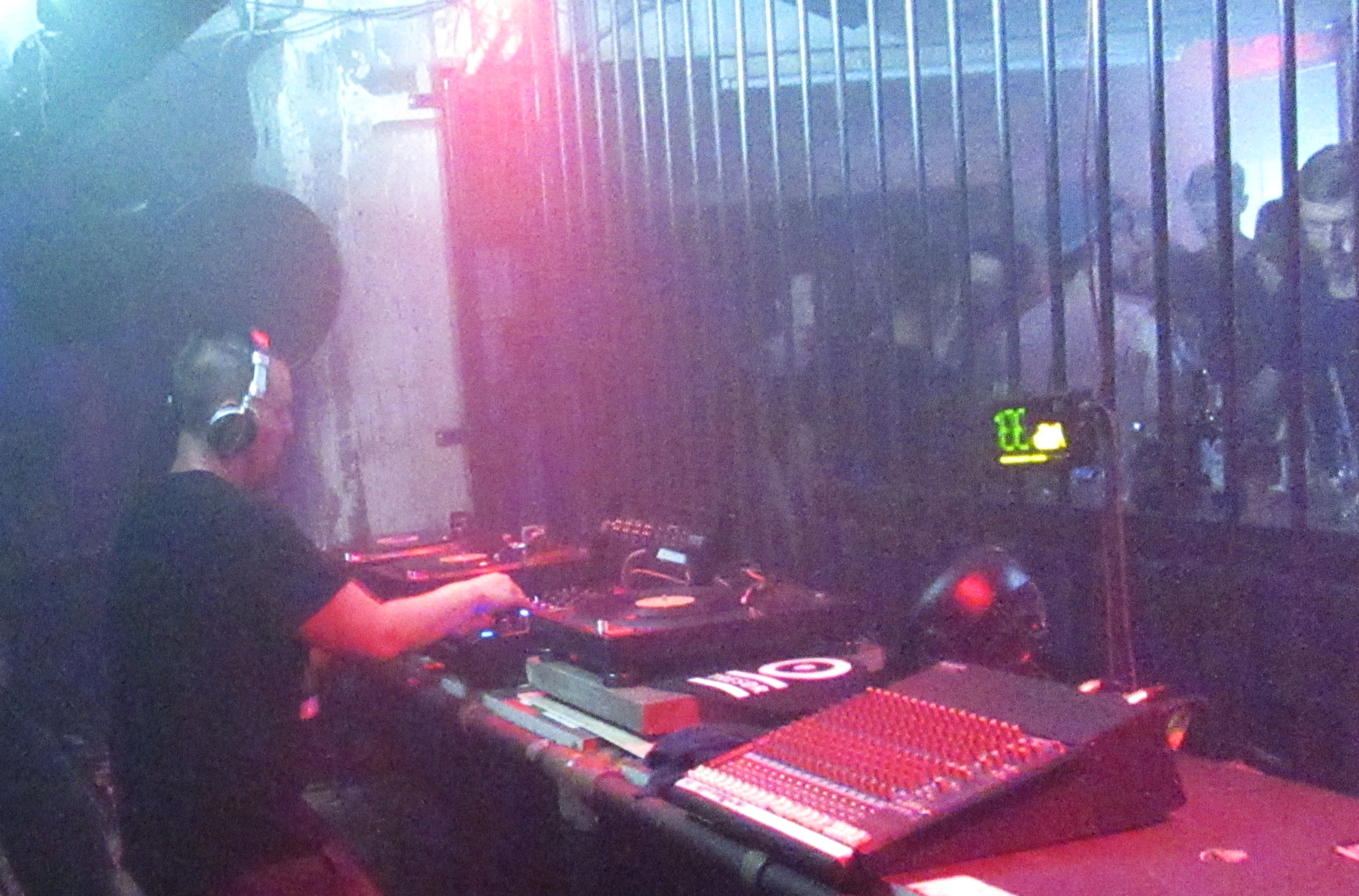
DJ booth of the club during a Detroit Techno party, August 2015

- Tresor 1: X-101: X-101 (12"/CD)
- Tresor 2: Dream Sequence feat. Blake Baxter – Dream Sequence (12"/ CD)
- Tresor 3: Eddie Flashin' Fowlkes & 3MB – 3MB featuring Eddie Flashin' Fowlkes (2x12"/CD)
- Tresor 4: X-102: Discovers The Rings of Saturn (2x12"/CD)
- Tresor 5: Ingator II – Skyscratch (Mano Mano) (12"/CD)
- Tresor 6: 3 Phase Feat. Dr. Motte – Der Klang Der Familie (12"/CD)
- Tresor 7: Blake Baxter & Eddie Flashin' Fowlkes – The Project (2x12"/CD)
- Tresor 8: Eddie Flashin' Fowlkes & 3MB – The Birth of Technosoul (2x12"/CD)
- Tresor 9: 3MB – 3MB Feat. Magic Juan Atkins (2x12"/CD)
- Tresor 10: X-103: Thera EP (12")
- Tresor 11: Jeff Mills – Waveform transmission Vol. 1 (2x12"/CD)
- Tresor 11: Jeff Mills – Waveform transmission Vol. 1 (Mispress) (2x12")
- Tresor 12: X-103: Atlantis (2x12"/CD)
- Tresor 13: Various – Detroit Techno Soul EP (12")
- Tresor 14: Various – Detroit Techno Soul Compilation (CD)
- Tresor 15: Tomi D. – You Are An Angel / B Basic (12")
- Tresor 16: System 01: Mind Sensations (12"/CD)
- Tresor 17: Vision, The – Waveform Transmission Vol. 2 (2x12"/CD)
- Tresor 18: TV Viktor – Trancegarden:Invitation Vol. 1 (CD)
- Tresor 19: 3 Phase – Straight Road (12"/CD)
- Tresor 20: 3 Phase – Schlangenfarm (2x12"/CD)
- Tresor 21: Piers Headley – Music For Toilets (CD)
- Tresor 22: Cristian Vogel – Absolute Time (2x12"/CD)
- Tresor 23: Jeff Mills – The Extremist (12")
- Tresor 25: Jeff Mills – Waveform Transmission Vol. 3 (2x12"/CD)
- Tresor 26: System 01: Take My Soul (12"/CD)
- Tresor 27: Robert Hood – Internal Empire (2x12"/CD)
- Tresor 28: System 01: Drugs Work (2x12"/CD)
- Tresor 29: Dream Sequence Feat. Blake Baxter – Endless Reflection (2x12"/CD)
- Tresor 30: Bam Bam – Best of Westbrook Classics (2x12"/CD)
- Tresor 31: Blake Baxter – Reach Out (12")
- Tresor 32: Robert Hood – Master Builder (12"/CD)
- Tresor 33: Joey Beltram – Game Form (12"/CD)
- Tresor 34: Joey Beltram – Places (2x12"/CD)
- Tresor 35: Various – Sirius (2x12"/CD)
- Tresor 36: Various – Magic Tracks Feat. Juan Atkins (12")
- Tresor 37: Gagarin Kongress – Astralleib (12")
- Tresor 38: Blake Baxter – Energizer (12")
- Tresor 39: Vigipirate – Boom EP (12")
- Tresor 40: Joey Beltram – Instant (12"/CD)
- Tresor 41: Bam Bam – The Strong Survive (12"/CD)
- Tresor 42: Bam Bam – The Strong Survive (2x12"/CD)
- Tresor 43: Various – 313 (12"/CD)
- Tresor 44: Cristian Vogel – Bite & Scratch (12")
- Tresor 45: Cristian Vogel – Body Mapping (2x12"/CD)
- Tresor 46: Renee Feat. Taj – When I Dream (12")
- Tresor 47: Eddie Flashin' Fowlkes Groovin / C.B.R (12")
- Tresor 48: Infiniti – The Infiniti Collection (12"/CD)
- Tresor 49: Eddie Flashin' Fowlkes – Black Technosoul (CD)
- Tresor 50: Joey Beltram – Metro (12")
- Tresor 51: Blake Baxter – La La Song (12")
- Tresor 52: Infiniti – Higher (12")
- Tresor 53: Neil Landstrumm – Understanding Disinformation (2x12"/CD)
- Tresor 54: Neil Landstrumm – Praline Horse (12")
- Tresor 55: Pacou – Reel Techno (12")
- Tresor 56: Holy Ghost – The Mind Control of Candy Jones (2x12"/CD)
- Tresor 57: Scan 7 – Dark Territory (2x12"/CD)
- Tresor 58: Si Begg – Opus EP (12")
- Tresor 59: Tobias Schmidt – Is It Peace To Point The Gun? (12")
- Tresor 60: Blue Arsed Fly – Knackered EP (12")
- Tresor 61: Holy Ghost – Manchurian Candidate (12")
- Tresor 63: Various – Tresor IV – Solid (2x12"/CD)
- Tresor 64: Various – Tresor V (2x12"/CD)
- Tresor 65: Cristian Vogel – (Don't) Take More (12")
- Tresor 66: Cristian Vogel – All Music Has Come to an End (2x12"/CD)
- Tresor 67: Holy Ghost – Electra Spectre (12")
- Tresor 68: Pacou – Cortex Delay (12")
- Tresor 69: Pacou – Symbolic Language (2x12"/CD)
- Tresor 72: Surgeon – First (12")
- Tresor 73: Surgeon – Basictonalvocabulary (2x12"/CD)
- Tresor 74: Blake Baxter Sex Tech (12")
- Tresor 75: Vice – The Pressure EP (12")
- Tresor 76: Jeff Mills – Waveform Transmission Vol. 3 (2x12"/CD)
- Tresor 77: Robert Hood – Internal Empire (2x12"/CD)
- Tresor 77: Robert Hood – Internal Empire (Mispress) (2x12")
- Tresor 78: Joey Beltram – Places (2x12"/CD)
- Tresor 81: Neil Landstrumm – Scandinavia Sessions (12")
- Tresor 82: Neil Landstrumm – Bedrooms And Cities (2x12"/CD)
- Tresor 82: Neil Landstrumm – Bedrooms And Cities (Mispress) (2x12")
- Tresor 83: Holy Ghost – Gone Fishin' (12")
- Tresor 84: Holy Ghost – The Art Lukm Suite (2x12"/CD)
- Tresor 85: Surgeon – Basictonal – Remake (12")
- Tresor 86: Tobias Schmidt – The Black Arts EP (12")
- Tresor 87: DJ T-1000 – Jetset Lovelife (12")
- Tresor 88: Scan 7 – Beyond Sound (12")
- Tresor 89: Pacou – Symbolic Language (Remixes) (12")
- Tresor 90: Joey Beltram – Ball Park (12")
- Tresor 91: Chrislo – Hangars D'Orion (12")
- Tresor 91: Chrislo – Hangars D'Orion (Mispress) (12")
- Tresor 92: Chrislo – Low (2x12"/CD)
- Tresor 93: Various – Globus Mix Vol. 1 (CD)
- Tresor 94: Various – Headquarters (2x12"/CD)
- Tresor 95: Surgeon – Balance Remakes (12")
- Tresor 96: Surgeon – Balance (2x12"/CD)
- Tresor 97: Various – Tresor III Compilation (2x12"/CD)
- Tresor 98: Various – Globus Mix Vol. 2: A Decade Underground (CD)
- Tresor 99: Pacou – No Computer Involved (2x12"/CD)
- Tresor 100: Various – Tresor 100 (Tresor Compilation Vol. 6) (2x12")
- Tresor 101: Leo Laker – 6 A.M. (12")
- Tresor 102: Blake Baxter – Disko Tech EP (12")
- Tresor 103: Neil Landstrumm – Pro Audio (2x12"/CD)
- Tresor 104: Tobias Schmidt & Dave Tarrida – The Test (12")
- Tresor 105: Infiniti – Skynet (2x12"/CD)
- Tresor 106: Advent, The – Sound Sketches (12")
- Tresor 107: Holy Ghost – Live in Amsterdam (12")
- Tresor 108: Joey Beltram – Game Form / Instant (12")
- Tresor 109: Various – Annex 2 (CD)
- Tresor 110: Cristian Vogel – Busca Invisibles (2x12"/CD)
- Tresor 111: Sender Berlin – Spektrum Weltweit (2x12"/CD)
- Tresor 112: Pacou – A Universal Movement (12")
- Tresor 113: DisX3 – Brothers in Mind (12")
- Tresor 114: Stewart S. Walker – Nothing Produces Stark Imagery (12")
- Tresor 115: Various – Globus Mix Vol. 3: Sturm Und Drang (CD)
- Tresor 116: Surgeon – Force + Form Remakes (12")
- Tresor 117: Surgeon – Force + Form (2x12"/CD)
- Tresor 118: Savvas Ysatis – Alright (12")
- Tresor 119: Leo Laker – Tontunmäki EP (12")
- Tresor 120: Cristian Vogel – General Arrepientase (12")
- Tresor 121: Scan 7 – Resurfaced (2x12"/CD)
- Tresor 122: Savvas Ysatis – Highrise (2xLP/CD)
- Tresor 123: Various – Tresor Compilation Vol. 7 (2x12"/CD)
- Tresor 124: The Advent – Sound Sketchez#2 (2x12")
- Tresor 125: Tobias Schmidt – Dark of Heartness (2x12"/CD)
- Tresor 126: Dave Tarrida Postmortem Pop (12")
- Tresor 127: Vice – Trojan Horse EP (12")
- Tresor 128: DJ T-1000 – Progress (2x12"/CD)
- Tresor 129: Drexciya – Neptune's Lair (2x12"/CD)
- Tresor 130: Drexciya – Fusion Flats (12")
- Tresor 131: Various – Tresor 7.5 (12")
- Tresor 132: Infiniti – Never Tempt Me (2x12"/CD)
- Tresor 133: DisX3 – Sequenzed Function (12")
- Tresor 134: Diskordia – Mala Mazza (12")
- Tresor 135: Various – Demo Tracks #01 (2x12"/CD)
- Tresor 136: Various – Annex 3 (CD)
- Tresor 137: Drexciya – Hydro Doorways (12")
- Tresor 138: Pacou – State of Mind (2x12"/CD)
- Tresor 139: Holy Ghost – The Jesus Nut (12")
- Tresor 140: Sender Berlin – Spektrum Weltweit (Remixes) (12")
- Tresor 141: Terrence Dixon – From The Far Future (2x12"/CD)
- Tresor 142: Various – Globus Mix Vol. 4: The Button Down Mind of Daniel Bell (CD)
- Tresor 143: Sterac – Untitled (12")
- Tresor 144: Subhead – Arucknophobia (12")
- Tresor 145: James Ruskin – Point 2 (2x12"/CD)
- Tresor 146: Stewart S. Walker – Reformation of Negative Space EP (12")
- Tresor 147: Karl O'Connor & Peter Sutton – Againstnature (2x12"/CD)
- Tresor 148: Pacou – Fireball (12")
- Tresor 149: Blake Baxter – EP Frequencies / Dream Sequence (12"/CD)
- Tresor 150: Various – Tresor 2000: Compilation Vol. 8 (2x12"/CD)
- Tresor 151: TV Victor – Timeless Deceleration (2xCD)
- Tresor 152: Subhead – Neon Rocka (2x12"/CD)
- Tresor 153: Diskordia – So Big & So Close (12")
- Tresor 154: Dave Tarrida – Scream Therapy (12")
- Tresor 155: Jeff Mills Metropolis 2 (12"/CD)
- Tresor 156: The Advent – 3rd Sketch (12")
- Tresor 157: Matthew Herbert – Mistakes (12")
- Tresor 157: Various – Globus Mix Vol. 5: Metthew Herbert – Letsallmakemistakes (CD)
- Tresor 158: Tobias Schmidt – Destroy (2x12"/CD)
- Tresor 159: Dream Sequence III Feat. Blake Baxter. FM Disko (12")
- Tresor 160: Dream Sequence Feat. Blake Baxter The Collective (2x12"/CD)
- Tresor 161: Dave Tarrida – Paranoid (2x12"/CD)
- Tresor 162: Dave Tarrida – Paranoid (Again) (12")
- Tresor 163: Various – Tresor Compilation Vol. 10: True Spirit (Special Edition) (CD)
- Tresor 164: Model 500 / Daniel Bell / Cristian Vogel – Sirius Is A Freund (Archiv #01) (12")
- Tresor 165: Bam Bam – Where Is Your Child (Archiv #02) (12")
- Tresor 166: Robert Hood – Master Builder (Archiv #03) (12")
- Tresor 167: DJ Shufflemaster – EXP (2x12"/CD)
- Tresor 168: Kelli Hand – Detroit History Part 1 (2x12"/CD)
- Tresor 169: Fumiya Tanaka – Drive EP (12")
- Tresor 170: Neil Landstrumm – Glamourama EP (12")
- Tresor 171: Savvas Ysatis – Select (2x12"/CD)
- Tresor 172: Ben Sims – Dubs 2 (12")
- Tresor 173: James Ruskin – Into Submission (2x12"/CD)
- Tresor 174: Various – Compilation Vol. 9 (2x12"/CD)
- Tresor 175: DJ Shufflemaster – Angel Gate (12")
- Tresor 176: Fumiya Tanaka – Unknown Possibility Vol. 2 (2x12"/CD)
- Tresor 177: Neil Landstrumm – She Took A Bullet Meant For Me (2x12"/CD)
- Tresor 178: Subhead – Baby Takes Three EP (12")
- Tresor 179: Tobias Schmidt – Real Life (12")
- Tresor 180: Various – Annex 4 (CD)
- Tresor 181: Drexciya – Harnessed The Storm (2x12"/CD)
- Tresor 182: Drexciya – Digital Tsunami (12")
- Tresor 183: Jeff Mills – Late Night (Archive #04) (12")
- Tresor 184: Dream Sequence Feat. Blake Baxter – Deep N Da Groove (Remix) (12")
- Tresor 185: Various – True Spirit (Part I) (2x12"/3xCD)
- Tresor 186: Various – True Spirit (Part II) (2x12")
- Tresor 188: Angel Alanis & Rees Urban – Bastard Traxx Vol. 1 (12")
- Tresor 189: Sender Berlin – Gestern Heute Morgen (2x12"/CD)
- Tresor 190: Eddie Flashin' Fowlkes – My Soul (Archiv #05) (12")
- Tresor 191: Dave Tarrida – Plays Records (12")
- Tresor 191: Various – Globus Mix Vol. 6: Dave Tarrida Plays Records (CD)
- Tresor 192: Cristian Vogel – Dungeon Master (2x12"/2xCD)
- Tresor 193: Chester Beatty – A Taste of Honey (12")
- Tresor 194: Blake Baxter – One More Time (Archiv #06) (12")
- Tresor 195: The Advent – Sketched For Life (2x12"/2xCD)
- Tresor 196: Shifted Phases – The Cosmic Memoirs of the Late Great Rupert J. Rosinthrope (2x12")
- Tresor 197: Various – Headquarters Berlin (2x12"/2xCD)
- Tresor 198: Mover, The – Frontal Frustration (2x12"/CD)
- Tresor 199: Angel Alanis & Rees Urban – Present Pair of Jacks "Full House" (2x12")
- Tresor 200: Scion – arrange & process Basic Channel tracks (CD)
- Tresor 201: House of Fix, The – 21st Century (12"/2xCD)
- Tresor 202: Chester Beatty – Shot of Love (12"/CD)
- Tresor 203: Din-St – Club Goods Vol 1 (12")
- Tresor 204: Rumenige – Petrzalka EP (12")
- Tresor 205: Various – Tresor Never Sleeps (CD)
- Tresor 205.5: Various – Tresor Never Sleeps (12")
- Tresor 206: Stewart Walker – Live Extracts (2x12"/CD)
- Tresor 207: Leo Laker – Somos Pocos, Pero Estamos Locos EP (12")
- Tresor 208: Organ Grinder – Life in the Shade (12")
- Tresor 209: Pacou – Last Man Standing EP (12")
- Tresor 211: Cybotron / Model 500 – Alleys of Your Mind / Off To Battle (12")
- Tresor 212: Various – Tresor Compilation Vol. 12: Illumination (2x12"/CD)
- Tresor 213: Joey Beltram – Beyonder (12")
- Tresor 214: Joey Beltram – The Rising Sun (3x12"/CD)
- Tresor 215: Juan Atkins – The Berlin Sessions (2x12"/CD)
- Tresor 216: Juan Atkins – 20 Years Metroplex: 1985-2005 (2xCD)
- Tresor 217: Todd Bodine – Particles EP (12")
- Tresor 218: Joey Beltram – Live@Womb (CD)
- Tresor 219: Cisco Ferreira – T.R.I.N.I.T.Y. (3x12"/CD)
- Tresor 220: Various – Tresor Compilation Vol. 13: It's Not Over (2x12"/2xCD)
- Tresor 221: Todd Bodine – Surfaces (CD)
- Tresor 222: Bill Youngman – Born EP (12")
- Tresor 223: Jeff Mills – Blue Potential (Live With Montpellier Philharmonic Orchestra) (DVD)
- Tresor 224: Cisco Ferreira – T.R.I.N.I.T.Y. Remixed (12")
- Tresor 225: Dave Tarrida – Gauteng Fever EP (12")
- Tresor 226: Joey Beltram – Code 6 (12")
- Tresor 227: Octave One – Off The Grid (12"/CD/DVD)
- Tresor 228: Tim Wright – Definitely Wrong (12")
- Tresor 229: Octave One – Off The Grid (2x12")
- Tresor 230: Oscar Mulero – Only Dead Fish Go with the Flow (12")
- Tresor 231: Cristian Vogel – The Never Engine (2x12"/CD)
- Tresor 232: James Ruskin – Lahaine (12")
- Tresor 233: James Ruskin – The Dash (2x12"/CD)
- Tresor 234: X-102 – Titan EP (12")
- Tresor 235: Oscar Mulero – Tresor Mix: Under Review (CD)
- Tresor 236: Remute – Crackin' Skulls EP (12")
- Tresor 237: Future Beat Alliance – Machines Can Help EP (12")
- Tresor 238: Future Beat Alliance – Mourning (12")
- Tresor 239: Vince Watson – Atom EP (12")
- Tresor 240: TV Victor – The Ways of the Bodies (CD)
- Tresor 241: Psycatron – People in Glass Houses (12")
- Tresor 242: Future Beat Alliance – Grey Summer (12")
- Tresor 243: Sleeparchive – Ronan Point (12")
- Tresor 244: Vince Watson – Interference EP (12")
- Tresor 245: Mike Huckaby – Tresor Records 20th Anniversary Mix (CD)
- Tresor 246: Pacou – Sense EP (12")
- Tresor 247: Various – SubBerlin: The Story of Tresor (CD/DVD)
- Tresor 248: Puresque – Vor Leitmotiv EP (12")
- Tresor 249: Puresque – Leitmotiv (2x12"/CD)
- Tresor 250A: Infiniti – The Remixes Pt.1 (12")
- Tresor 250B: Infiniti – The Remixes Pt.2 (12")
- Tresor 250C: Infiniti – The Remixes Pt.3 (12")
- Tresor 251: Marcelus – Super Strength EP (12")
- Tresor 252: Mike Huckaby – The Tresor EP (12")
- Tresor 253: s_w_z_k – s_w_z_k (2x12"/CD)
- Tresor 254: Puresque – Leitmotiv (The Remixes) (12")
- Tresor 255: Scan 7 – The Resistance EP (12")
- Tresor 256: Terrence Dixon – From The Far Future Pt. 2 (2x12"/CD)
- Tresor 257: s_w_z_k – Variant & Empires EP (12")
- Tresor 258: Juan Atkins/Audiotech – I Love You/Techno City '95 (Archiv #07) (12")
- Tresor 259: Zenker Brothers – Lion in Mars (12")
- Tresor 260: Sleeparchive – A Man Dies in the Street Pt.1 (12")
- Tresor 261: Marcelus – Emerald EP (12")
- Tresor 262: Juan Atkins & Moritz Von Oswald – Borderland (3x12"/CD)
- Tresor 263: Savvas Ysatis - Archiv #08 (2 x 12")
- Tresor 264: Sleeparchive - A Man Dies in the Street Pt.2 (12")
- Tresor 265: Peter Van Hoesen - Life Performance (CD)
- Tresor 266: Peter Van Hoesen - Life Performance EP
- Tresor 267: Zenker Brothers - Stratusphunk EP
- Tresor 268: Various Artists - Demo Tracks #01 (12")
- Tresor 269: Marcelus - Shine EP (12")
- Tresor 270: Transllusion - The Opening of the Cerebral Gate (CD / 3LP)
- Tresor 271: Transllusion - Mind Over Positive And Negative Dimensional Matter (CD / 3LP)
- Tresor 272: Jonas Kopp - Red Plented EP (12")
- Tresor 273: Jonas Kopp - Beyond The Hypnosis (2LP)
- Tresor 274: DJ Deep & Roman Poncet - Extraction (12")
- Tresor 275: DJ Deep & Roman Poncet - Hydraulic Pressure (12")
- Tresor 276: Confucio - Golden Rule EP (12")
- Tresor 277: Mønic - Parsons Hill EP (12")
- Tresor 278: Surgeon - Tresor '97 – '99 (3CD)
- Tresor 279: Jonas Kopp - HHH EP (12")
- Tresor 280: Shao - Doppler Shift EP (12")
- Tresor 281: Adventice - Exsurgence (12")
- Tresor 282: Psyk - Works (12")
- Tresor 283: Zadig - The Stellar Hunter EP (12")
- Tresor 284: Juan Atkins & Moritz Von Oswald present Borderland - Riod (12")
- Tresor 285: Juan Atkins & Moritz Von Oswald present Borderland - Transport (12")
- Tresor 286: Mønic - Four Sides of Truth EP (12")
- Tresor 287: Marcelus - Vibrations (3x12" LP)
- Tresor 288: Porter Ricks - Shadow Boat EP (12")
- Tresor 289: Mike Parker - Disintegrating Sand EP (12")
- Tresor 290: BNJMN - The Body Between Us Pt.1 (12")
- Tresor 291: Various Artists - Dreamy Harbor (3 x 12"/ CD)
- Tresor 292: Pacou - A Shot in the Dark EP (12")

== See also ==
- List of electronic dance music venues
- Lists of record labels
