= Bar 25 =

Nightclub in Berlin, Germany

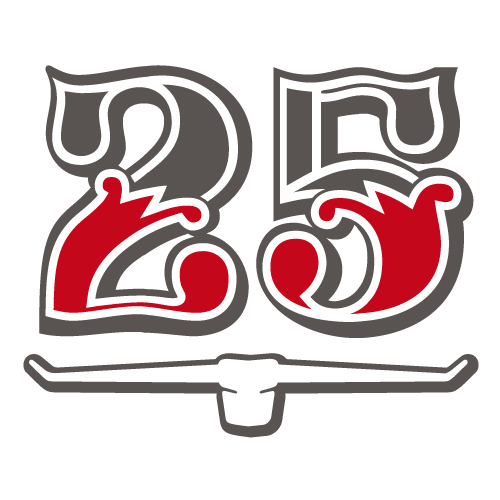
- Bar 25 logo
- Location: Friedrichshain, Berlin, Germany
- Type: Bar, open-air club

Construction
- Opened: 2003
- Closed: 2010

Website
- www.bar25.de

Bar 25 (also as: Bar25, short: Bar) was a bar, open-air club and cultural venue on the banks of the Spree river in Berlin's Friedrichshain district.

== History ==
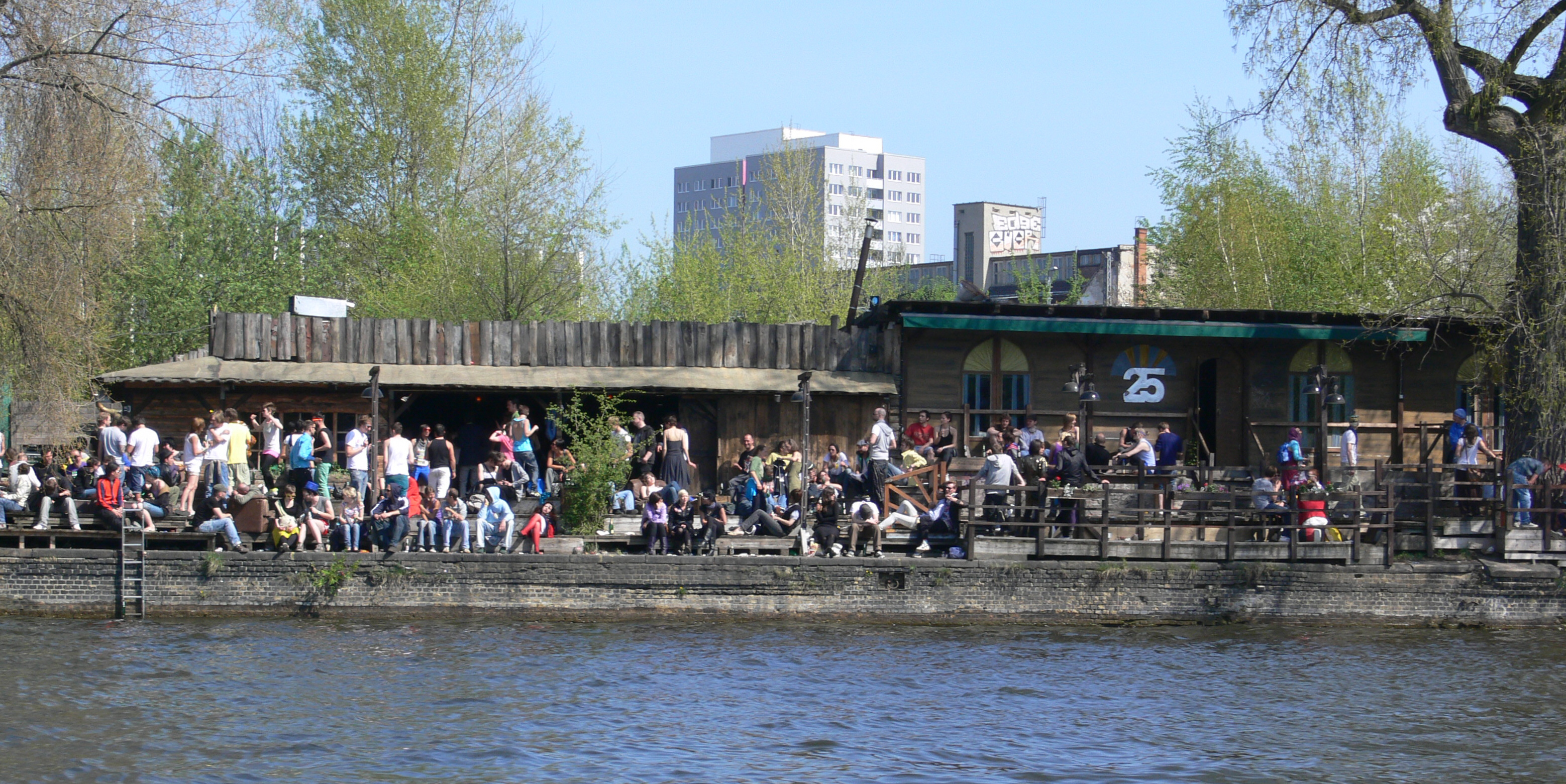
Bar 25 in April 2009

During its operation from 2003 to 2010, Bar 25 became known for its costume and confetti parties, as well as parties that lasted up to 48 hours. The venue played music genres such as techno or rock music. It closed its doors in September 2010 after a five-day non-stop party.

On May 3, 2012, the documentary Bar25 – Tage außerhalb der Zeit premiered in German cinemas, documenting the history of Bar 25 and its founders from the very beginning.

After the closure of Bar 25, the founders opened the club Kater Holzig on the other side of the Spree river in an old soap factory and afterwards the Kater Blau at the same location as Bar 25.

== Venue ==
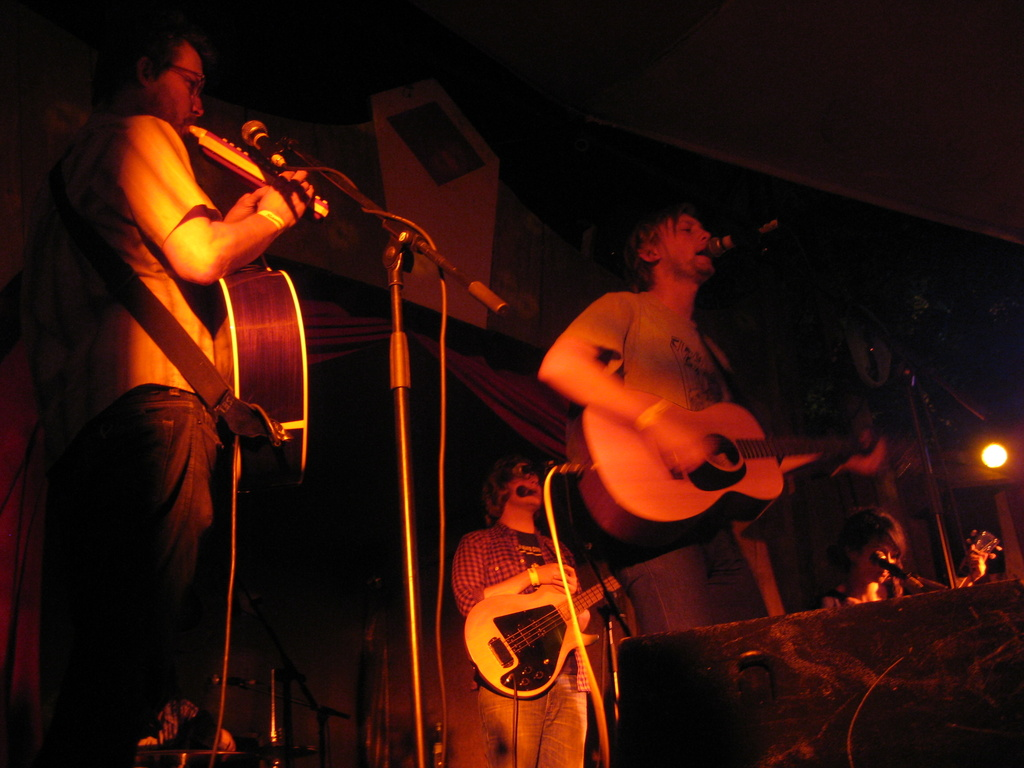
Port O'Brien at Bar 25 (2009)

The area of the open-air club was separated from the street by a wooden fence. The club itself consisted of a wooden shed in the style of a western saloon, which could be used only in the summer. In winter, the place remained closed. The building was extended and rebuilt many times over the years. From the second year on, an upscale restaurant operated in the rear area of the club. The place included a music stage, a fireplace, a hostel, a circus tent for theater and cinema performances, a pizza hut, a sauna area with a pool, and private accommodation on the premises, as many employees also stayed there long-term. Playground equipment such as swings, a discarded bumper car or a vodka slide gave the bar the appearance of a playground for adults. Over the years, many international DJs and bands performed at the club. The club also had a record label.

In the course of the development, a closing party was celebrated in the autumn of each year for several years in a row, but it was possible to extend the lease agreement several times and obtain the corresponding permits from the city administration.

== Location and further development ==
The site on which Bar25 was located was situated between Holzmarkt street and the north bank of the Spree river, not far from the Ostbahnhof. The location in the former border area meant that the property was undeveloped for decades. As with many of these urban empty spaces along the former Berlin wall strip, it was subcultural users who appropriated the place. The founders of Bar25 leased the land from the state-owned waste disposal company until the latter sold the land in 2012 as part of the Berlin investment project Mediaspree.
