= Alexander Kowalski (musician) =

German musician (born 1978)

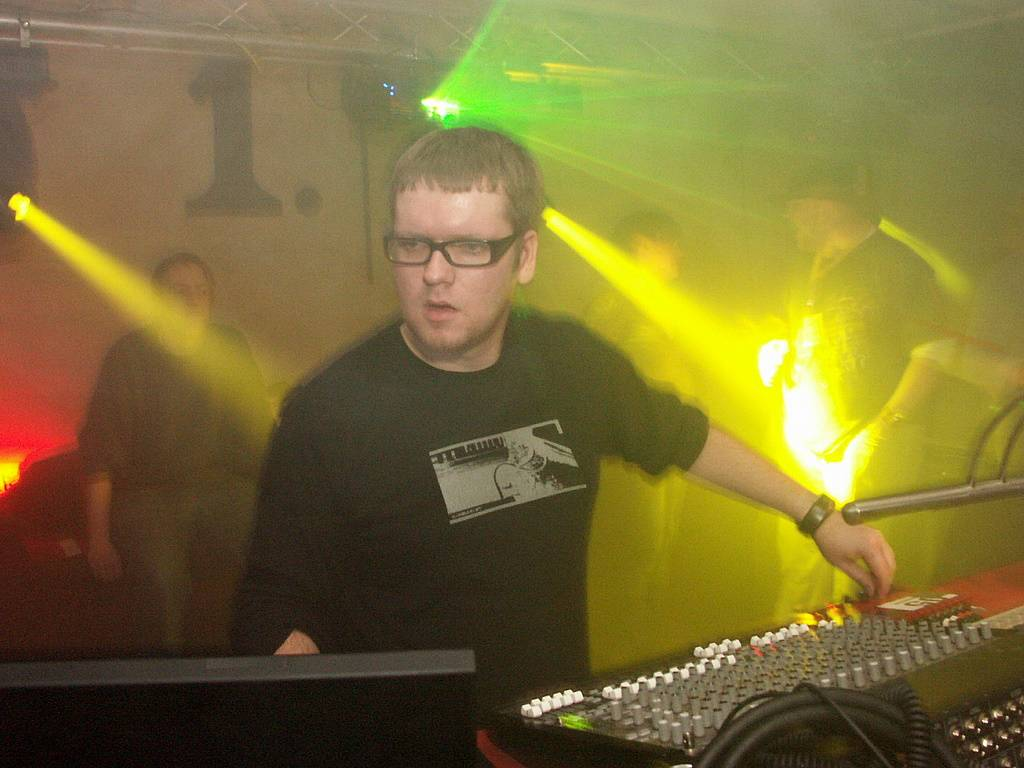
Alexander Kowalski performing in 2006

Alexander Kowalski (born 1978 in Greifswald) is a German techno music artist.

== Career ==
Kowalski moved to Berlin in the early 1990s, and became exposed to techno music there. Early influences on his work were Joey Beltram and Synewave, though he was limited to using cheap instruments to emulate them. He performed his first live gig at the Tresor Club in Berlin, and soon thereafter got in contact with Pacou and Sender Berlin, eventually releasing his first track on Proton Records in 1999. That same year, Kowalski and collaborator Stassy from Sender Berlin debuted as the techno team Double.

Kowalski released his debut record Echoes in 2001, on the Kanzleramt label. He quickly produced a follow-up, Progress (early 2002).

A year and a half after his second album, he released Response, including the single "Belo Horizonte". He was nominated twice for the German dance award in 2003. After a break of three years, he switched record labels from Kanzleramt to Different.

== Discography ==
- Can't Hold Me Back (Album Mix) Alexander Kowalski & Funk D'Void
- Changes (Original Mix) Alexander Kowalski
- Delicious (Original Mix) Alexander Kowalski
- House of Hell (Original Mix) Alexander Kowalski
- My Truth (Original Mix) Alexander Kowalski
- She's Worth It (Album Mix) Alexander Kowalski
- So Pure (Original Mix) Alexander Kowalski
- Start Chasing me (Original Mix) Alexander Kowalski
- The Path To Zero (Original Mix) Alexander Kowalski
- What U Gonna Do (Original Mix) Alexander Kowalski
- Your Affection (Original Mix) Alexander Kowalski

Aliases: DisX3, D Func, Double X (with Torsten Litschko).

=== Singles (Solo) ===
- 1999 Auto Cycles EP (as DisX3)
- 2000 Functones (as D Func)
- 2000 Dark Soul
- 2000 Live
- 2001 Echoes / Phasis
- 2001 Progress
- 2001 Art of Function (as DisX3)
- 2002 Waves Vol. 1 (as DisX3)
- 2002 All I Got To Know
- 2002 Hot Spot/Delicious
- 2003 Waves Vol. 2 (as DisX3)
- 2003 Belo Horizonte
- 2004 Lock Me Up
- 2004 You Think You Know

=== Albums (Solo) ===
- 1999 Brothers in Mind (as DisX3)
- 1999 Sequenzed Function (as DisX3)
- 1999 Untitled (as DisX3)
- 2001 Chaos Space Marines (as DisX3) (with Bandulu)
- 2001 Echoes
- 2002 Progress
- 2003 Response
- 2006 Changes
- 2018 Cycles

=== Co-Production ===
- Double X (with Torsten Litschko)
  - 1999 Strain One's Ears (album)
  - 1999 unGleich 1
  - 2000 UnGleich in Exile (album)
  - 2003 Charis
  - 2004 A:LIVE (album)
  - 2004 Flashbacks
