= Ufo (club, Berlin) =

Coordinates: 52°30′08″N 13°26′24″E

The Ufo (lit. UFO) was the first acid house club in Berlin. It is considered a pioneering place for the techno scene during the reunification of Germany. Residents and guest DJs at the club included, among others, Tanith, Jonzon, Rok, Dr. Motte, Mike van Dijk and the then 13-year-old Kid Paul.

== History ==
=== Ufo ===
The techno activists Achim Kohlenberger, Dimitri Hegemann and the former history student Carola Stoiber, founded the Ufo club in 1988 in West Berlin, in its first year it was located at the No. 6 Köpenicker Straße, in Kreuzberg, near Schlesisches Tor in the basement of an old residential building, that their electronic music label Interfisch had rented as headquarters. Originally they opened the club with the name Fischbüro'.

The basement room had a ladder for access and an improvised kitchen on the side of the building, it had a ceiling height of only about 6 ft 2.8in (1.90 meters) of space for up 100 people. In 1989, it hosted the after party celebration of the first Love Parade.

=== Ufo 2 ===
As the authorities discovered the club's illegal operation of acid house parties, the club moved and finally worked inside a former store building at the Großgörschenstraße in Schöneberg, just before the fall of the Wall in 1989. In the meantime, Ufo parties were set up in different places and the locations were usually given in hidden clues in the Saturday show The Big Beat hosted by Monika Dietl, from the SFB- teen radio station Radio 4U. In January 1990 the DJ Tanith established, his Wednesday regular show Cyberspace.

After the club closed in 1990, the owners opened in the following year the Tresor club which became one of the world's most famous techno clubs.

== See also ==
- List of electronic dance music venues
