= Frontpage (techno magazine) =

German magazine

Frontpage was a German magazine for electronic music and techno culture. The first release was in May 1989 with a run of 5000 copies and 8 pages. From this, Frontpage developed into one of the most important German techno magazines, with a run of 70,000 copies and 140 pages in 1996. Stefan Weil is one of the founders. It was established as an in-house fanzine for Technoclub, Dorian Gray, located in Frankfurt Airport. In 1992 the headquarters was moved to Berlin. Running out of money, the last release of Frontpage was in April 1997.
