= Acid Maria =

German record producer and disc jockey

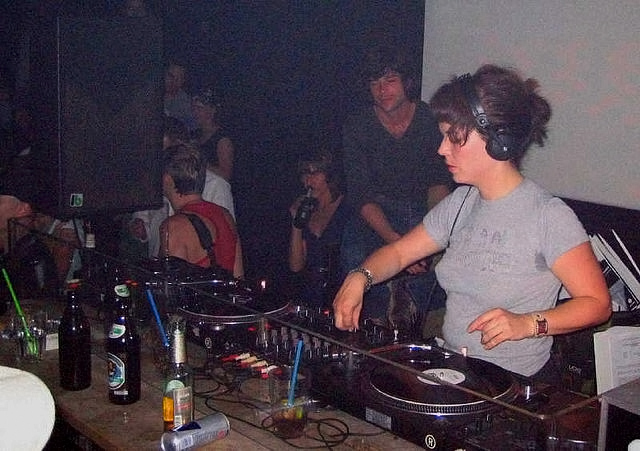
Acid Maria at Munich Club Die Registratur in 2005.

DJ Acid Maria, born Angelika Lepper, is a German DJ and music producer of electronic music. Her musical style is between techno and Chicago house. She became famous as the house DJ of the Munich clubs Ultraschall and Harry Klein.

== Career ==
Her career began on December 6, 1992, when she performed for twenty people for "Jockey Slut Night" at Club Alcatraz in Munich.

In the Munich scene she was next known as a co-owner of a store that sold clubwear clothing.

Acid Maria was the first house DJ of Munich's first techno club Ultraschall since its establishment. She performed and produced projects for DJ Hell's International DeeJay Gigolo Records label, founded in 1996. She was later house DJ for the Munich club Harry Klein, the Berlin club WMF and the club event Killekill, as well as the Cologne club Subway.

In between these roles, she toured worldwide, playing at "Festival Tecnogeist 2000" in Mexico City, the Womb Club in Tokyo and Mayday in Dortmund.

She has worked with and produced albums with Steve Bug, Markus Güntner, the Teichman Brothers, and Abe Duque.

She studied Media Arts and Philosophy and Aesthetics at the Karlsruhe University of Arts and Design. Between 2004 and 2014, she taught at various universities in Berlin, including at Konrad Wolf Film University of Babelsberg in Potsdam and Bauhaus-Universität Weimar in Weimar.

She is a founding member of the international network female:pressure, an organization for female, transgender and non-binary artists in electronic music. With Electric Indigo she mixed Female Pressure Presents: Welttour [World Tour] in 2003.

DJ Acid Maria lives in Utting am Ammersee.

== Discography ==
- 1995: Steve Bug & Acid Maria – Toby Nation (Raw Elements)
- 1996: Steve Bug & Acid Maria – Indescreet (Raw Elements)
- 1998: Steve Bug & Acid Maria – You Might Be Surprised (Raw Elements)
- 2003: Acid Maria & Electric Indigo – Female Pressure Presents: Welttour (Welttour, True People)
- 2005: Acid Maria & Abe Duque – Turn down the lights (Abe Duque Records)
