= Monique Fessl =

Austrian music producer and DJ

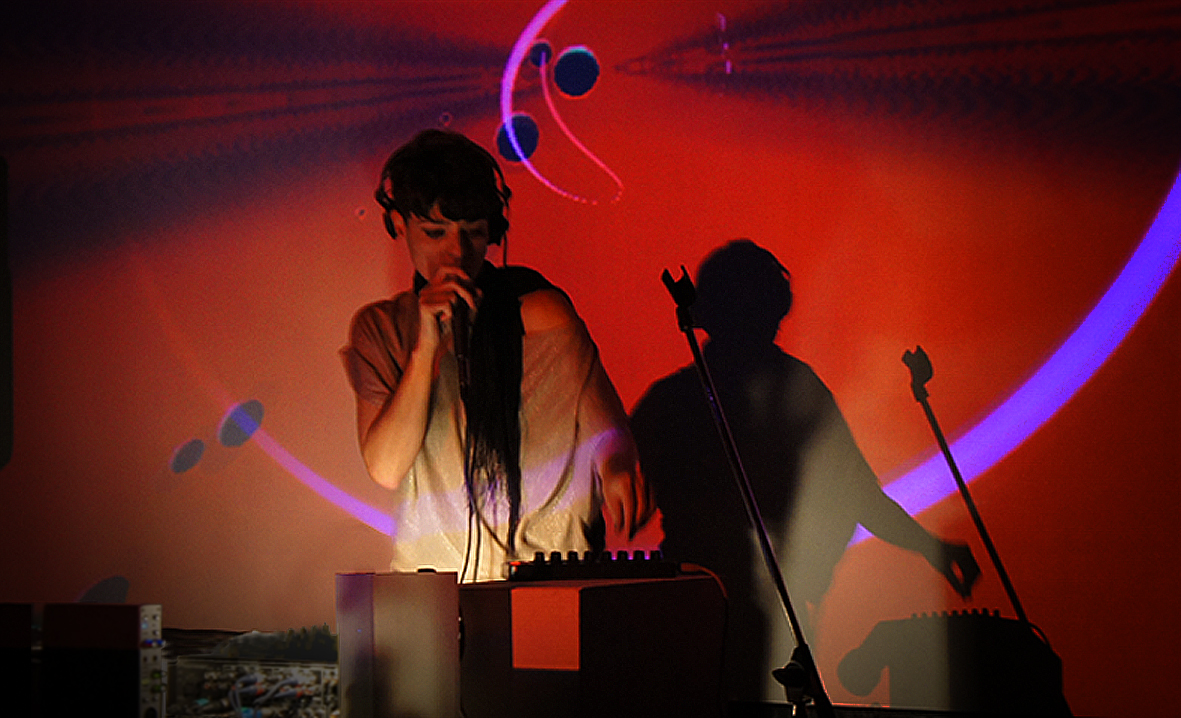
- Monique Fessl, Photo by Elmar Gubisch
- Born: May 2, 1974 (age 52); Sankt Lorenzen im Mürztal
- Citizenship: Austrian
- Education: University of Applied Sciences, Joanneum Graz (degree), University of Graz (master's degree)
- Occupations: Music producer, Composer, Techno – DJ, Singer, Media artist.
- Organization: Female:pressure
- Known for: Working solo

Monique Fessl (born May 2, 1974 in St.Lorenzen/Mürztal) is an Austrian music producer, composer, Techno – DJ, singer and media artist.

== Life and work ==
The acute examination for own compositions begins 1995. The first release with her band "Back to Godhead", a classical guitar band formation, wins at the Austrian SKYPE CONTEST and made the second place Europe-wide. This is followed by further releases in different formations and genres between Indie Rock and Elektro-Pop. In 2003 Monique Fessl is nominated for the Austrian "Amadeus Award" with the band-project Nimai (with Gregor Henning and Volker Pflüger).

Since 2006 Monique Fessl is working solo. The style focuses on electronic music and Techno, combined with her melodic vocals. Releases are published on labels like TONGUT(Switzerland), Monomental digital (Hannover), Futureaudio (Hamburg) or Zeiger records (Graz), featuring the 2008 FM4 hit "Schnee mit Matsch".

In 2014 she released a remix of the single "The Violets" from the Austrian electronic musician "Favela Gold".

In 2015 Monique Fessl is working on a new production in cooperation with the Swiss artist Apoll (TONGUT), which will be released in August 2015.

Monique Fessl has a master's degree in Astrophysics at the University of Graz, Austria, and a degree for media- and interaction design at the University of Applied Sciences Joanneum Graz. She is a member of Female:pressure, an international data-base for female Djs, music producers and artists, having been founded by Susanne Kirchmayr (DJ Electric Indigo).

== Discografie ==
LPs

- 1998: Icecream for Love (with Back to Godhead)
- 1999: Play me (with Shuka)
- 2002: Fallen from a Star (with Nimai)

EPs

- 2008: Who knows, Tongut

Singles

- 2014: The Violets (Monique Fessl Remix), Favela Gold

Compilations

- 1996: Springtime, Shelter, Jaya Radha-Madhava, Desaster Area, Promotion-Sampler
- 1999: Sugar Candy Mountain, Dream, pop 37,38, pop!platte
- 1999: Sugar Candy Mountain, Austrian Sound Odyssey, projekt pop!, AKM, IFPI Austria, SR – Archiv Österreichischer Popularmusik
- 2001: The Lovesong, Soundtrack Ikarus, monkey music
- 2002: One Love, FM4 Soundpark, VWSF-03/02
- 2003: What, When, If, Is?, Nibblingontheloops, Sevenahalf
- 2008: Let loose (mit Willi Gangster), Soundtrack Schlimmer geht's nimmer
- 2008: The Love Track (Apoll Re-Loved), Konform, Tongut
- 2008: Schnee mit Match, Styrian Stylez, Zeiger Records
- 2009: About it we are silent (Remix), Sozonov, Compilation Elevate, Zero inch, Kangaroo
- 2009: The Love Track (Apoll Re-Loved), Minimal Techno Vol. 7, futuraudio Records
- 2009: Im Augenblick (mit Martin Mathy), Styrian Stylez, Zeiger Records
- 2011: Crater (Sozonov ft. Monique Fessl), Felerica
- 2012: Komm Gib Mir Deine Hand (guestmusician), Jugend, Binder & Krieglstein), earcandy recordings

Live sets

- 2015-04-08 Eröffnungskonzert Ausstellung "Desiring the real.Austria contemporary", Club OnStage, Shanghai/China mit Dorit Chrysler
- 2015-03-19 sound:frame – "Departures: Austrian Days“, Pilsen – Europäische Kulturhauptstadt
- 2015, Tschechien mit Bernhard Fleischmann und Sixtus Preiss
