= Ultraschall =

Nightclub in Munich, Germany

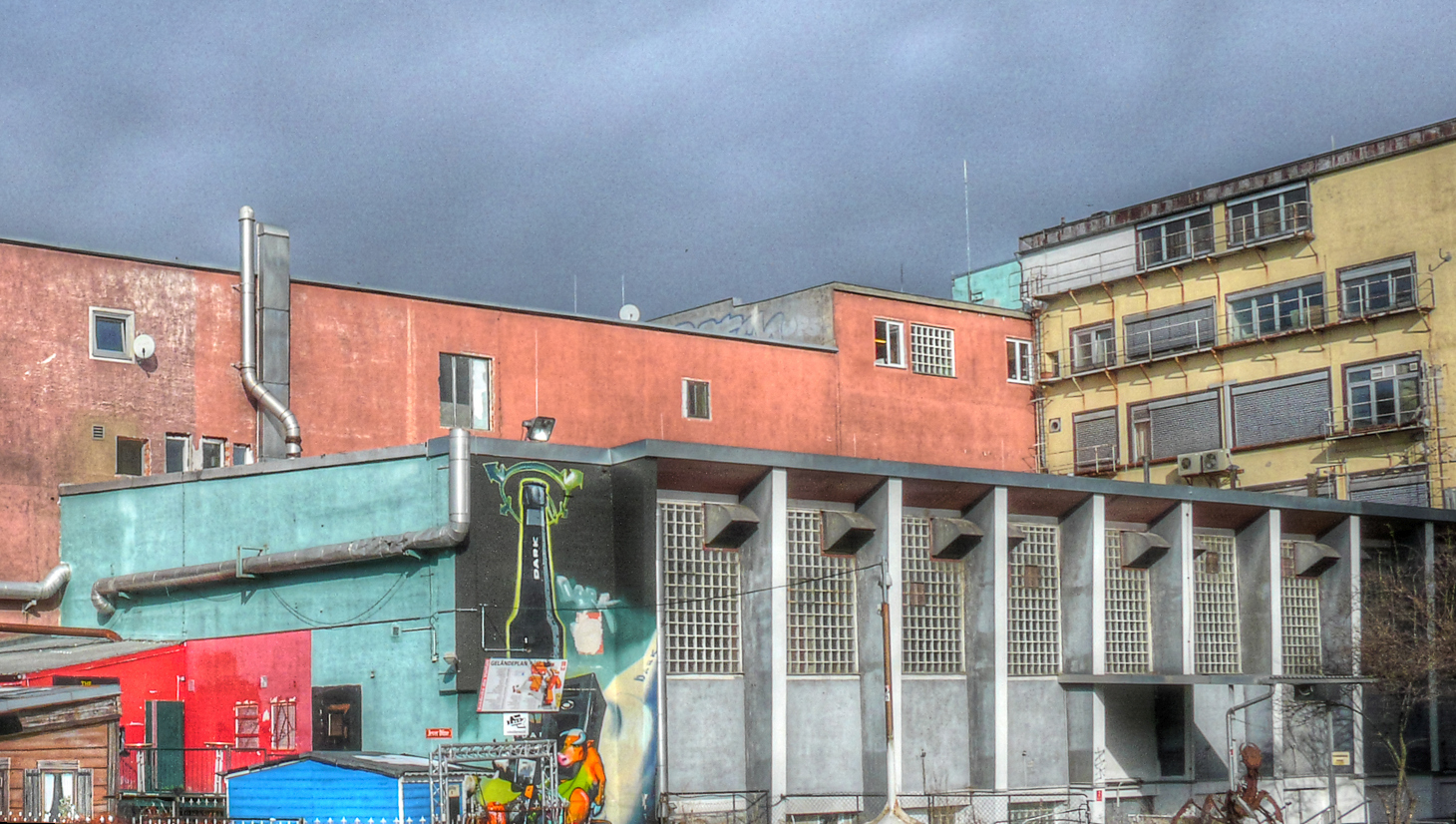
- Ultraschall II in the former potato washing facility of the Pfanni factory
- Interactive map of Ultraschall
- Address: Grafinger Str. 6, Kunstpark Ost
- Location: Berg am Laim, Munich, Germany
- Coordinates: 48°7′24″N 11°36′30″E
- Operator: Ultraschall GmbH
- Type: Nightclub
- Event: Techno

Construction
- Built: 1950s
- Opened: June 1994
- Closed: January 2003

Website
- Ultraschall

Ultraschall (German: Ultrasound, German: [ˈʊltʁaʃal]) was a nightclub in Munich, Germany from 1994 to 2003. The techno club belonged, besides the Tresor and E-Werk in Berlin, the Dorian Gray and Omen in Frankfurt, and the Munich-based clubs KW – Das Heizkraftwerk, Natraj Temple and Millennium, to the most renowned clubs of Germany's 1990s techno culture. According to FazeMag, Ultraschall was "for many techno fans the most authentic techno club alongside the Tresor".

== History and description ==
=== Origins ===
The origins of the club lie in the monthly Ultraworld parties on the grounds of an alternative cultural center in Munich's Oberföhring borough, which was called Kulturstation and often also hosted punk concerts. The techno club nights were inspired by the nascent techno scene in Berlin and especially the clubs Tresor and Planet at that time. Because of the popularity of the parties and the lack of ventilation, the music had to be interrupted every two hours and to open the windows in order to supply sufficient oxygen.

=== Ultraschall I ===
On 17 June 1994 the first Ultraschall club was opened by Peter Wacha, David Süss and Dorothea Zenker in the former canteen kitchen of the recently decommissioned Munich-Riem Airport. The club is considered to be the first pure techno club in Munich, after earlier clubs in the city also had other music genres in their program besides techno (such as Parkcafé, Nachtwerk, Pulverturm, Tanzlokal Größenwahn or Babalu Club). At the opening gig, Jeff Mills still played in front of only 120 paying guests and decided not to charge anything, but a few months later the club took off and became a grand success. A special feature of the club was that it was completely coated with white ceramic tiles. Moreover, large parts of the club were fitted out with spaceship decorations taken from the science fiction movie The High Crusade. With such avant-garde decorations, and the overall concept of an "world of experience", where beyond the music also light installations and video art played an important role, Ultraschall achieved international fame. The crew members and resident DJs of the club included DJ Hell, Monika Kruse, Richard Bartz and Acid Maria. There was no headliner at Ultraschall; no one told the DJs who had to play when and for how long, they had to decide among themselves. The parties at Ultraschall were notorious for being experimental and wild. According to Monika Kruse "one day the whole dancefloor was arranged as a giant bed. People came around to consume mushrooms, or just brought along their bongs with them. They all lied on the floor and chatted". As the area of the former Munich Airport was needed for the planned new borough Messestadt Riem, the Ultraschall I and all other clubs and halls on the compound had to close in summer 1996.

=== Ultraschall II ===
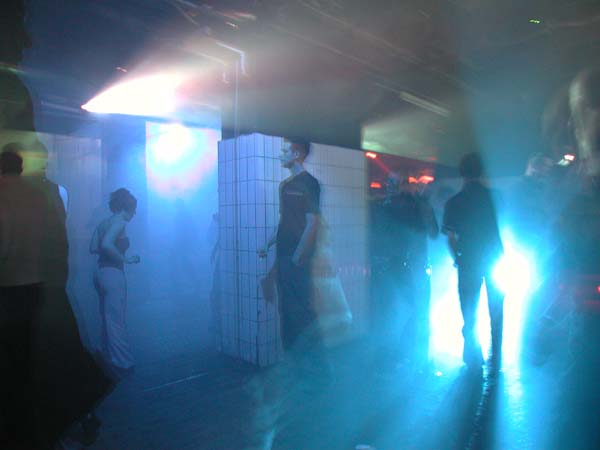
Main floor of the Ultraschall II

The complete party area of the Riem airport now moved to the Kunstpark Ost, a former factory site of 90.000 m^{2} close to the Ostbahnhof train station in Munich's Berg am Laim district. Ultraschall was re-opened there by Michi Kern and colleagues in the former potato washing facility of the Pfanni factory on 13 September 1996. The new premises were much larger than the first Ultraschall and allowed to establish two dance floors. The main floor was located in the factory's former swimming pool for washing potatoes and, as with the first Ultraschall club, was completely lined with white ceramic tiles and divided by columns. The floor tiles were later covered by a wooden floor. The space, characterized by simple geometric shapes, had the ambience of an industrial production site, but due to its strong angularity it did not have the atmosphere of a warehouse club. The main floor was known for the cold clanking sound, as well as for the wooden floor which was vibrating strongly due to the basses. Due to its decoration with green flokati, the second floor became known as the Green Room. Since 1998 this room served as a home base for the popular Flokati House Club, which was initiated by Tobi Neumann and in the 2000s moved on to the Harry Klein Club when Ultraschall closed. On Saturdays, the green room served as the chill out for the Main Floor, which provided space for 1,500 people and where international acts such as Jeff Mills, Carl Craig, Jay Denham or Green Velvet played. Just as the Ultraschall I, its successor put a lot emphasis on decoration, light installations and video art by the Highflyer crew, and both incarnations of the club are considered as being some of the best decorated venues of all time. When the Kunstpark Ost party areal had to close on 31 January 2003, Ultraschall had to close as well.

=== DJs and legacy ===
DJs and live acts who played at Ultraschall include international acts such Jeff Mills, Underground Resistance, Carl Craig, Miss Kittin, The Hacker, Blake Baxter, Robert Hood, Anthony Rother, Joey Beltram, Umek, Chris Korda, Chicks on Speed, I-F, Adam Beyer, Cari Lekebusch, Marco Carola, Ian Pooley, Cristian Vogel, John Tejada, The Advent, Jay Denham, Green Velvet, Anthony Shakir, DJ Tanith, Robert Görl, Johannes Heil, Electric Indigo, among many others. The club also launched the careers of many of its residents, some of which became important representatives of the German techno scene themselves. Famous resident DJs of Ultraschall include DJ Hell, Monika Kruse, Richard Bartz, Acid Maria and Tobi Neumann. Ultraschall and Munich-based techno labels such as International DeeJay Gigolo Records, Disko B and Kurbel Records formed a close network, and the club was used as a test platform for all new records of these labels. Further the club was used by the labels to get to know and enlist guest DJs, such as for example Blake Baxter, I-F or Abe Duque.

=== Successors ===
In the converted halls of the Ultraschall II main floor, on 12 March 2005 the Octagon club opened, after a club called Phosphor had tried a fresh start there in 2004. One part of the Ultraschall crew opened the much smaller Harry Klein Club, which can be seen as a successor of the Green Room, and became one of the world's most popular clubs as well. The other part of the Ultraschall crew opened the club Rote Sonne, which reminds of the Ultraworld and also became one of Europe's most popular techno clubs. In the 2010s, the Nox Club was the last venue that resided in the former bar area of the Ultraschall, before the factory building was demolished in January 2016, in order to create space for the planned Werksviertel working and residential district.

== Gallery ==
Ultraschall II in 2001

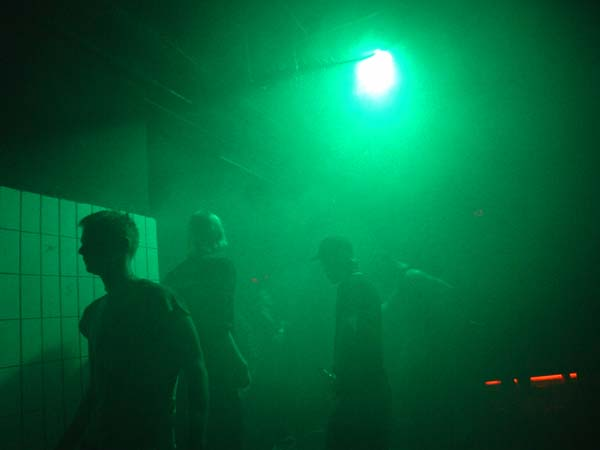

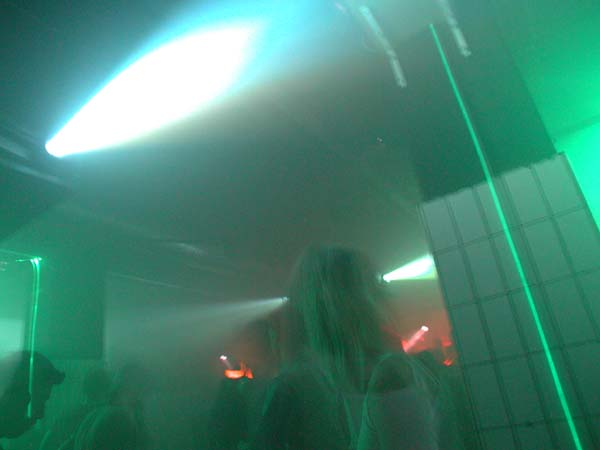

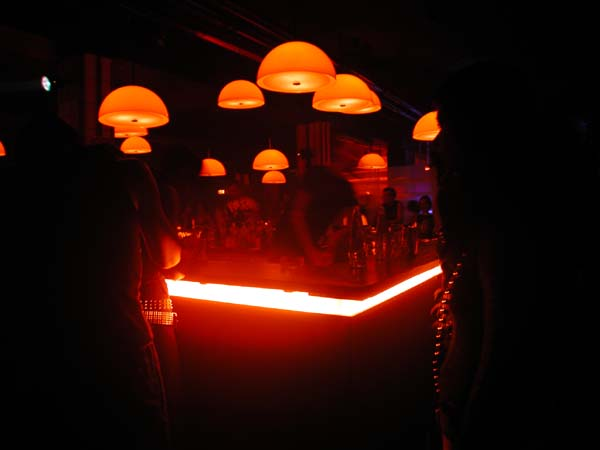

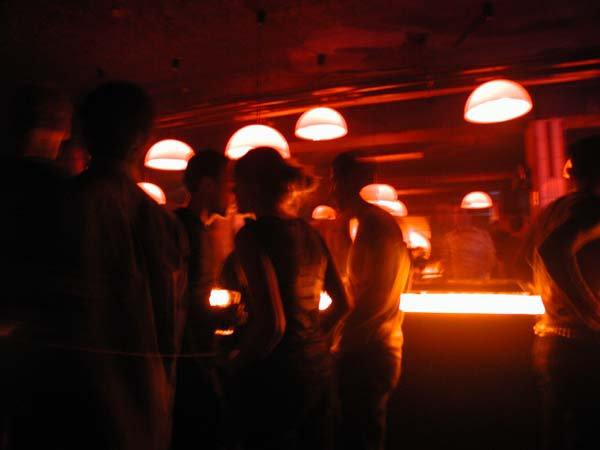

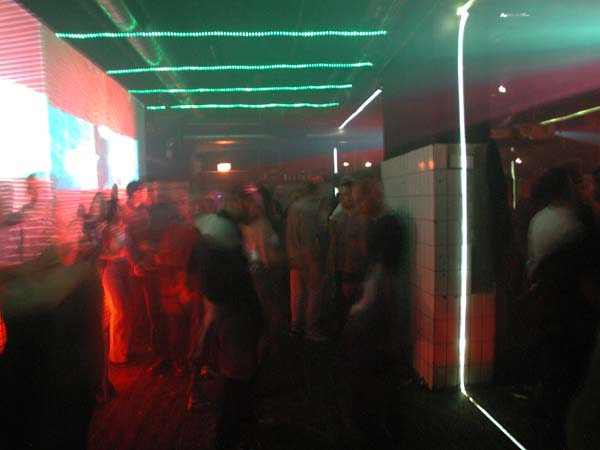

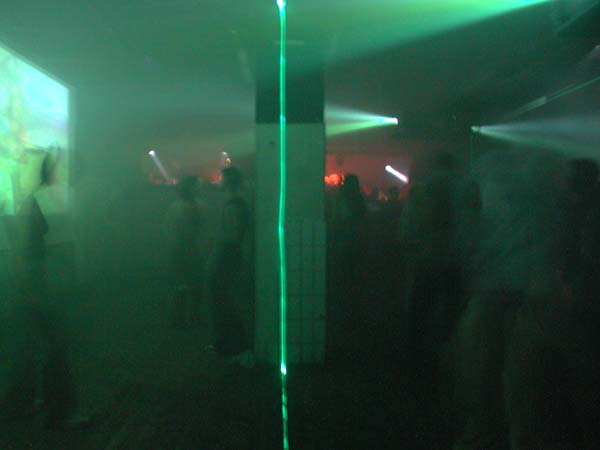

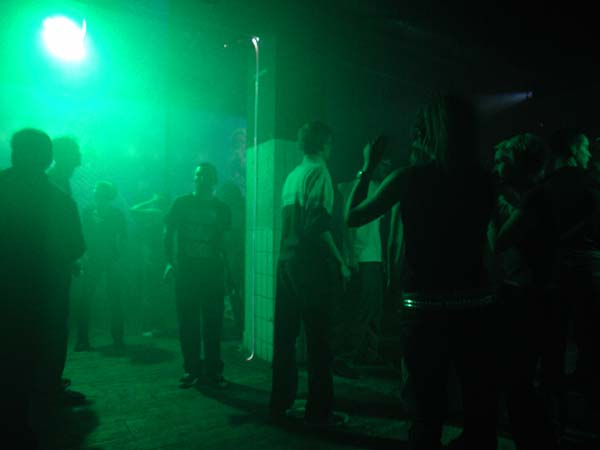

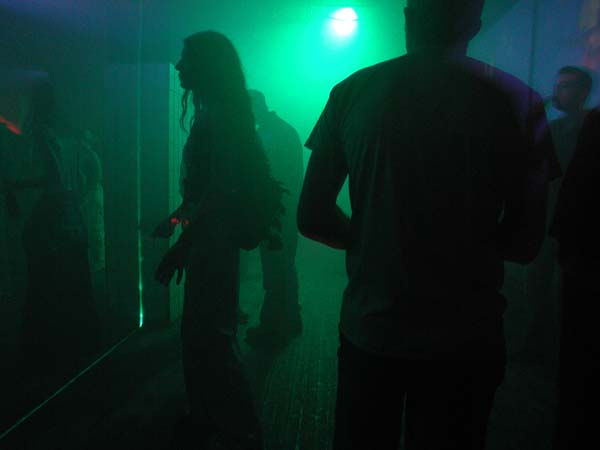
1997

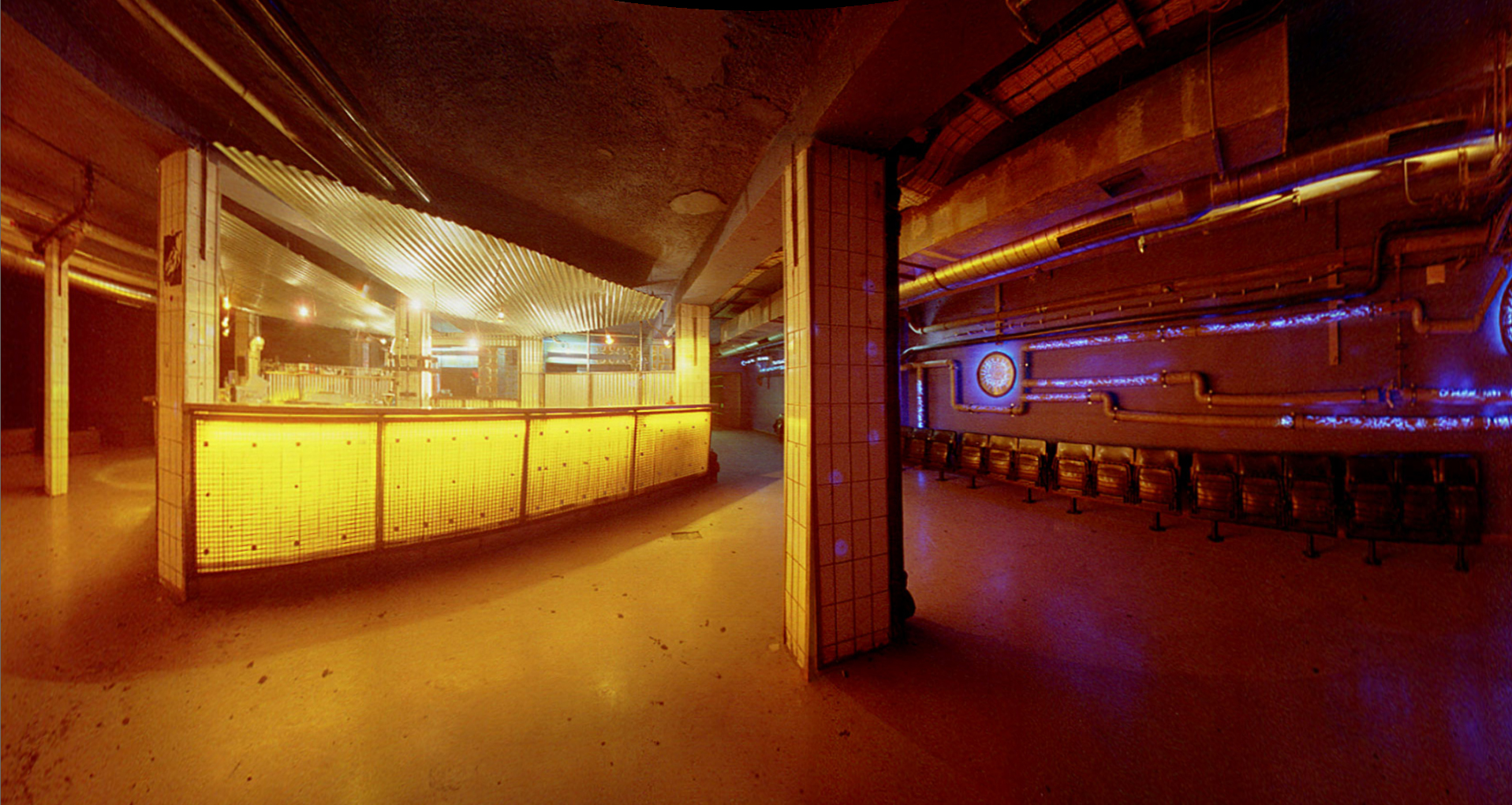
Bar

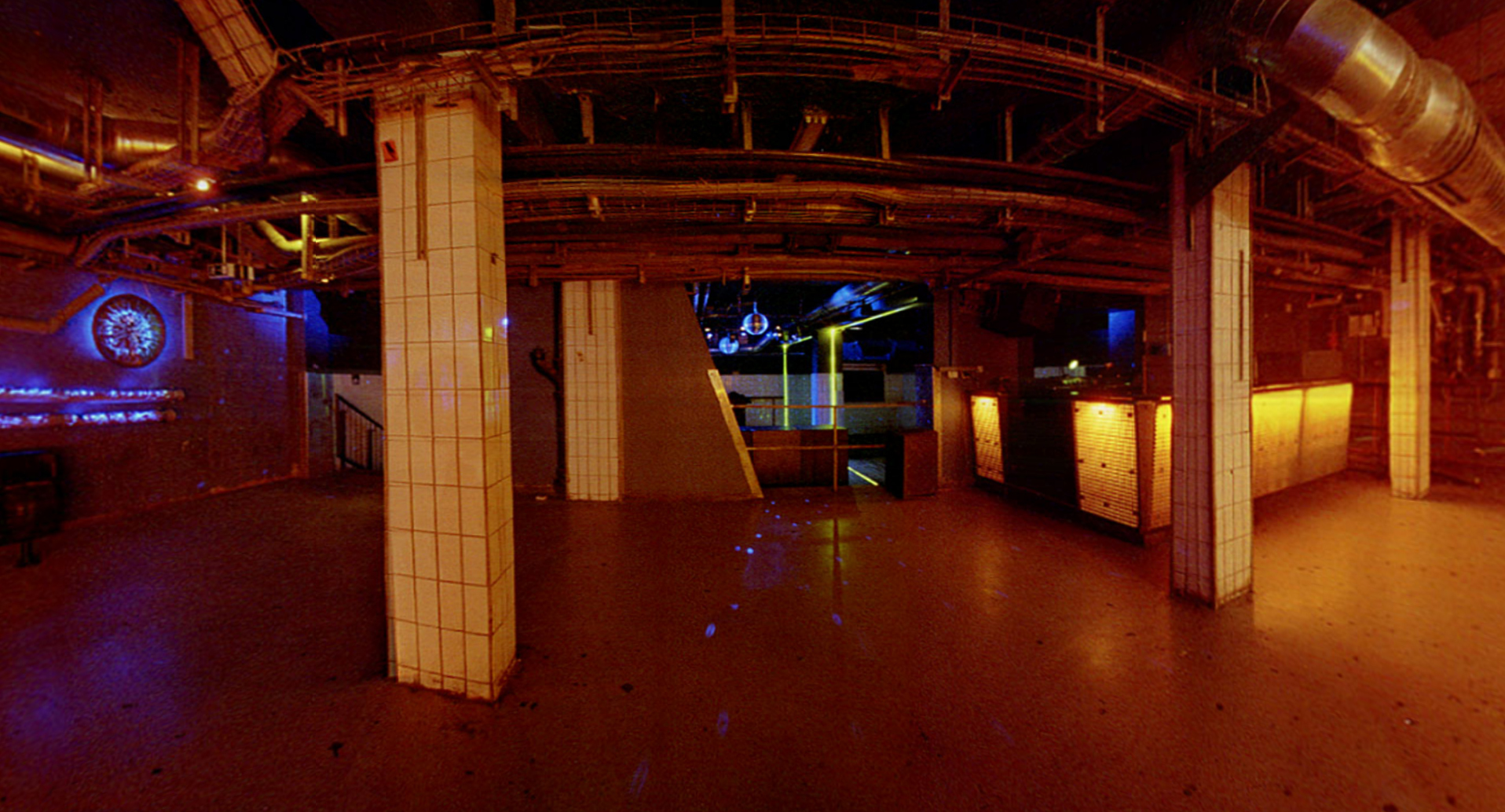
DJ Booth

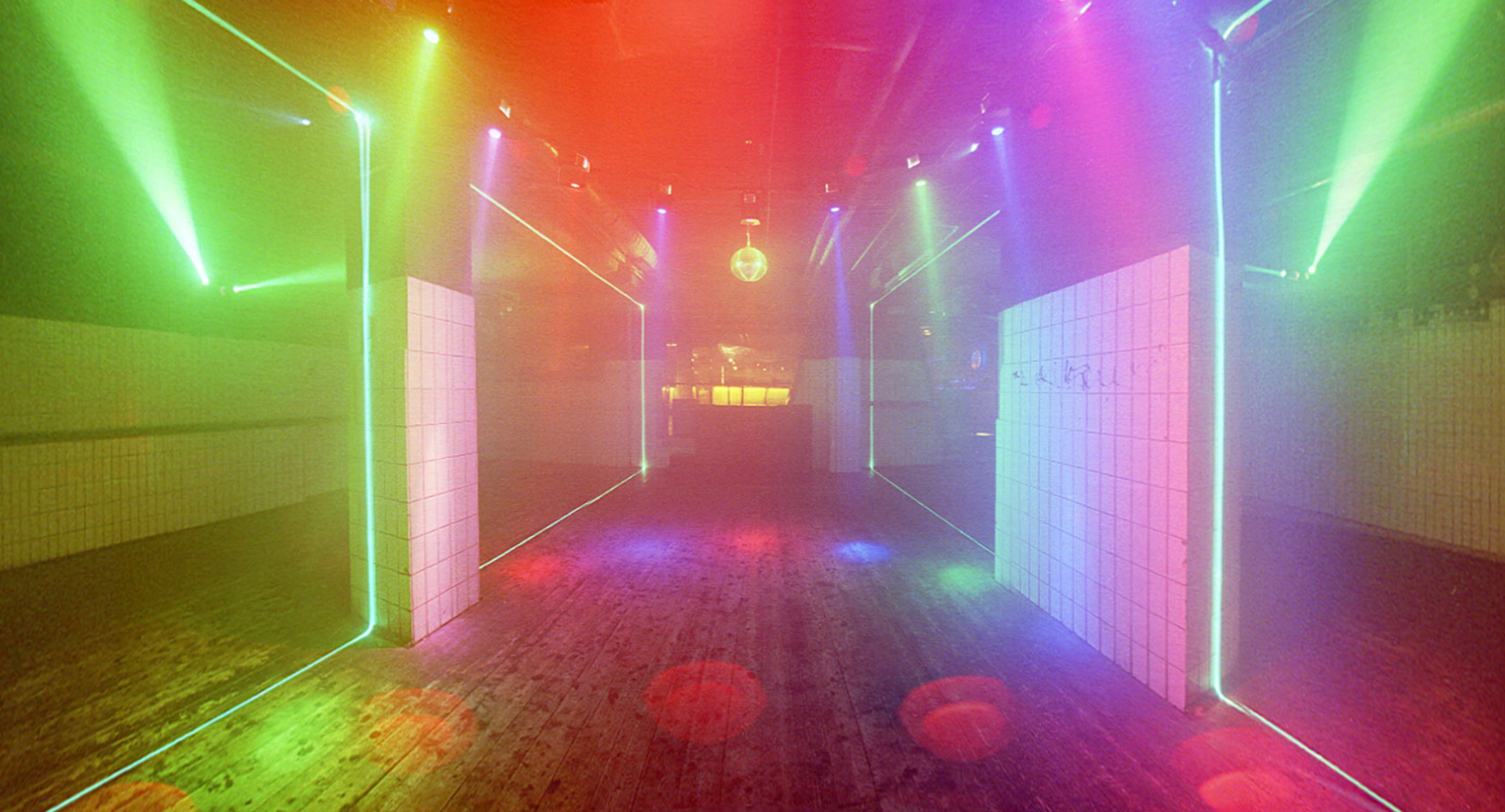
Mainfloor

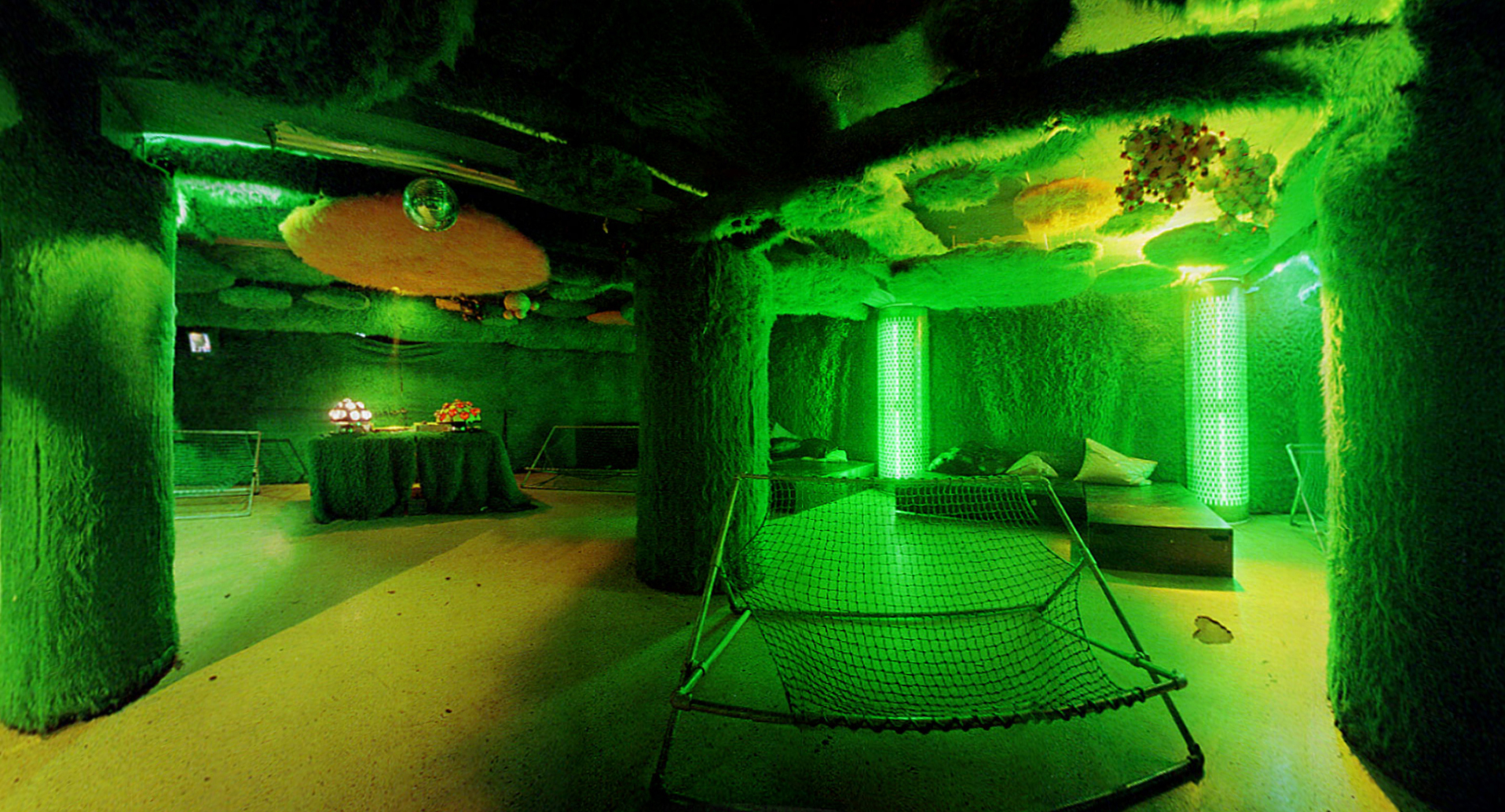
Green Room

== Literature ==
- Mirko Hecktor, Moritz von Uslar, Patti Smith, Andreas Neumeister: Mjunik Disco – from 1949 to now (in German). Blumenbar Verlag, München 2008, ISBN 978-3-936738-47-6.

== See also ==
- List of electronic dance music venues
