= DJ Hell =

German DJ (born 1962)

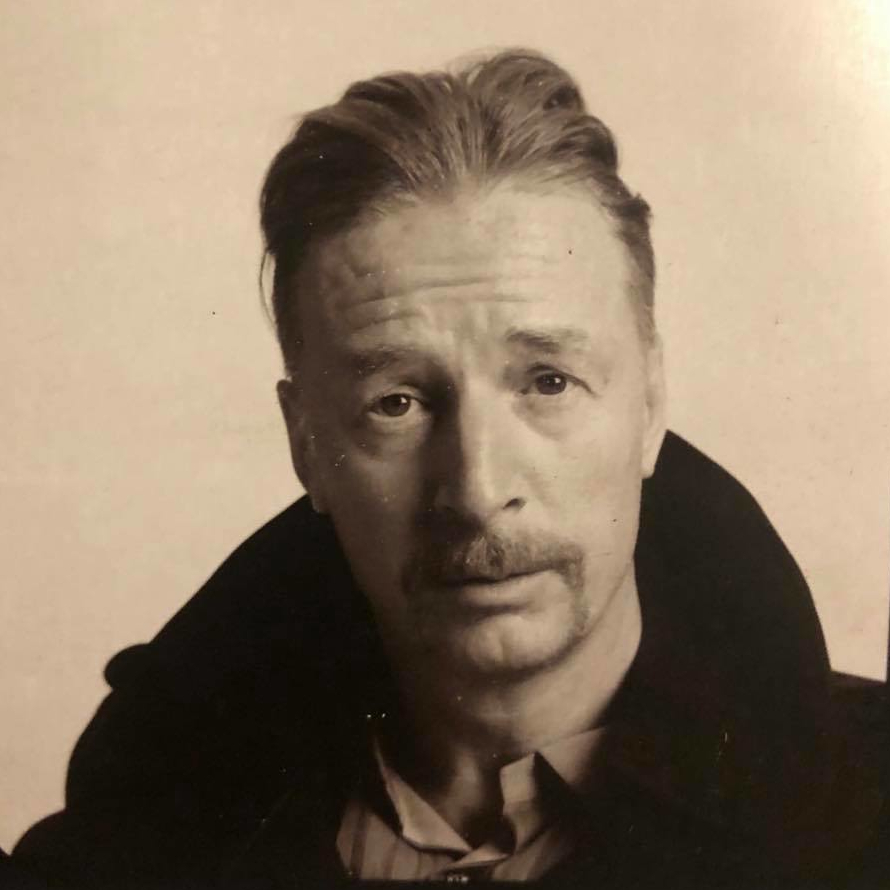
- Geier in 2002
- Born: Helmut Josef Geier; 6 September 1962 (age 64); Altenmarkt an der Alz, Bavaria, West Germany (now Germany)
- Occupation: DJ
- Years active: 1978–present

Helmut Josef Geier (born 6 September 1962), known professionally as DJ Hell, is a German DJ.

== Biography ==
=== 1970s and 1980s ===
DJ Hell described his musical beginnings in an interview with The European, telling them “I was socialized with German electronic music of the 1960s and 1970s. There were no commercial aspirations; it was all about experimentation.”

Hell has worked as a DJ since 1978. Starting in 1983, he began working as a DJ at Club Libella in Kirchweidach, Germany, near his hometown of Altenmarkt an der Alz. This would be his first residency, where he cultivated his eclectic style of mixing New Wave, Ska, Punk, Rockabilly, Hip hop, and Disco in the same set. Further residencies followed, at Park Café and Tanzlokal Grössenwahn in Munich, where, as one of the first house DJs in Germany he regularly performed at house music parties. In 1987 he organized the first acid house party there, and in the same year at Grössenwahn deejayed at Run–D.M.C.’s aftershow party. At the end of the 1980s, he developed his style at various Munich clubs and dance halls from New Wave, EBM, Electro, and Hip hop to include House and Techno.

=== 1990s ===
In the early 1990s, DJ Hell was resident DJ at Germany's first afterhours club Babalu Club in Munich. In 1991, Hell was instrumental in establishing Peter Wacha's label Disko B, and until 1996 was closely involved as A&R. The label's first release in 1991, Silicon Soul’s track Who Needs Sleep Tonight was licensed by Hell, who produced a remix for the b-side: The DJ G. Hell Remix. To sign the contract with the New York band, he flew to New York City. Disko B Records was launched for the release.

Hell's first self-produced single, My Definition of House Music (on R&S) became a club hit in 1992 with over 100,000 records sold, drawing recognition to DJ Hell among the first generation of Techno DJs who also released records.

During his time with Disko B and until 1997, DJ Hell was also a resident DJ at Ultraschall, Munich's first pure techno club, located on the site of the former Munich-Riem Airport and later at the former Pfanni factory compound Kunstpark Ost. During the 1990s DJ Hell had further residencies in Berlin, at E-Werk and WMF, from 1992 at Tresor, and in the 2000s at Watergate.

Parallel to his A&R work in Munich, in 1992 DJ Hell became A&R manager for the label Logic Records in Frankfurt, and in the same year compiled the world's first trance compilation, Logic Trance.

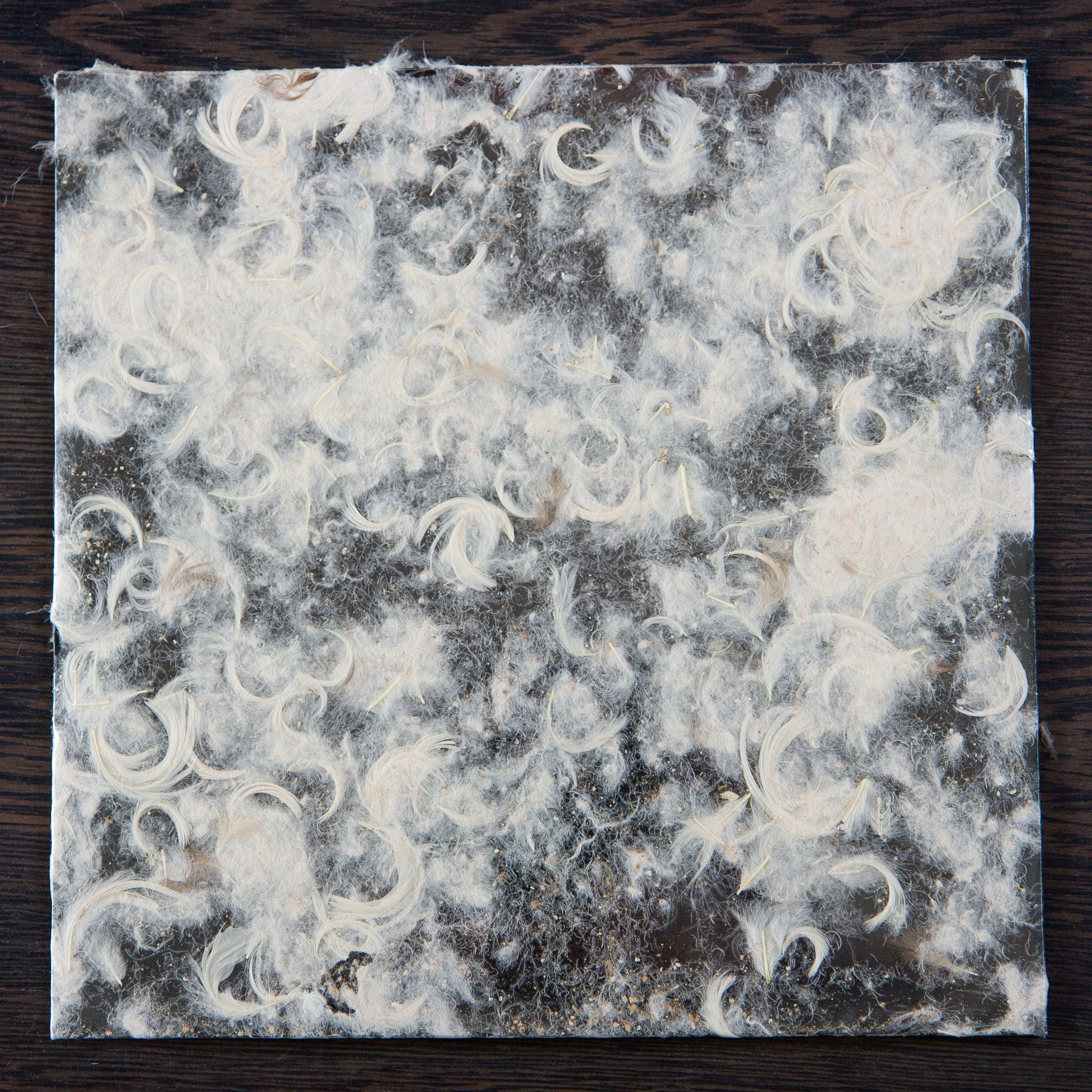
Album cover, Geteert & Gefedert

In 1993 he lived for a year in New York City, where was booked as a resident DJ at Limelight, together with Jeff Mills. In 1994 DJ Hell moved to Berlin and worked for the record store Hard Wax. Hell's debut album Geteert & Gefedert (Tarred & Feathered) was released on Disko B in 1994. In 1995, he moved back to Bavaria.

That same year, Hell was the only German DJ to be invited to be on a John Peel Session, including a radio interview, in London. The session was released that year on Disko B.

In addition to his work as a DJ and producer, in 1996 he founded the label International Deejay Gigolos in Munich, for which he served from the first day onward as the label mastermind, A&R, and art director. Parallel to managing the label, as a DJ and event organizer, Hell also curated over 40 Bavarian Gigolo Nights featuring international DJs and live bands in various clubs in Munich.

During this period in the late 1990s, numerous releases on International Deejay Gigolos notably fuelled the 1980s revival in the German and international club scene, establishing DJ Hell as one of the founders of the Electroclash subgenre. International Deejay Gigolos has released works by big names on the international Techno, House, and Electro scenes, including Jeff Mills, Miss Kittin & The Hacker, Dave Clarke, Tiga, Fischerspooner, Dopplereffekt, Vitalic, Bobby Konders, The KLF, Tuxedomoon, and Laurent Garnier. Fischerspooner was discovered by DJ Hell and debuted on International Deejay Gigolos. Stylistically, International Deejay Gigolos focused, beyond the Electroclash genre, also on Electro, EBM, electronic avant-garde House, Tech-House, and Techno, with influences from 1980s Pop and Disco. In the 20 years spanning 1996 to 2016 that he has handled A&R for the label, Hell has released over 300 singles and albums on International Deejay Gigolos.

In 1998, Hell's second album Munich Machine was released on Disko B and V2 Records. According to The Guardian Munich Machine was an important record that helped to catalyse electroclash. According to the music magazine De:Bug: “Munich Machine feels like the result of a dynamic collaboration by Munich residents engaged in the club scene and who know how to work with it. Every aspect of it has been carefully crafted and sometimes it seems as if DJ Hell is using this kind of mega-mix to grow beyond himself. This is particularly evident when he mixes together very different sources.”

In 1999, Arnold Schwarzenegger sued International Deejay Gigolos for using his picture in the logo. Hell had to stop selling all records that bore the logo and pay a fine of 150,000 euros.

=== 2000s ===
From 2000 to 2003, he ran the disco and nightclub Villa Traunstein, located in the Bavarian town of Traunstein, where he was responsible for the club's high-profile, international DJ bookings, including the likes of WestBam, Sven Väth, and Jeff Mills.

In 2003, DJ Hell lived for a second time in New York City, where he produced his third studio album NY Muscle, for which he collaborated with several artists, including Alan Vega, Erlend Øye, James Murphy, and singer Billie Ray Martin. The website allmusic.com wrote about NY Muscle: “This is the sound of nighttime New York City from the outsider perspective of an infamous German named Hell, and it’s dark, dark, debauched fun.”

Since 2005, DJ Hell has been based in both Munich and Berlin, and moved the label office to Berlin. Since the early 2010s Hell lives again mainly in Munich and in his hometown Altenmarkt at the Chiemsee.

From 2007 to 2010, he served as musical coordinator for Berlin fashion designer Michael Michalsky, for whose fashion shows he regularly produced the music. Hell has also performed at the after-show parties of Michael Michalsky's StyleNite, held during the Berlin Fashion Week. DJ Hell has been producing music for fashion shows since the mid-1990s, for the likes of Hugo Boss, Raf Simons, Patrick Mohr, Dirk Schönberger, and Donatella Versace – ever since he was first asked by fashion designer Kostas Murkudis to accompany one of his fashion shows in Berlin with music.

DJ Hell occasionally works with renowned fashion labels, either lending his name or collaborating as a designer. This work has given rise to an underwear collection for Wendy & Jim, women's underpants for Agent Provocateur, CD cases for Magma, and a pair of glasses for Freudenhaus. In 2004, Karl Lagerfeld photographed DJ Hell for V Magazine. These photographs were then exhibited at a gallery in Berlin. DJ Hell on his affinity for fashion (in SPEX #316/2008, p. 95f): “In England, fashion and music have gone together for decades. In Germany, however, one tends to deny a musician’s competence if he defines himself superficially, that is, according to things that are visible. Just think of David Bowie on the male side, and Grace Jones on the female side, and it becomes clear that a union between fashion and music can be incredibly prolific.”

As a DJ, Hell has toured worldwide, and repeatedly headlined international festivals such as the Loveparade and Mayday in Berlin, Fuji Rock and Wire in Tokyo, the Montreux Jazz Festival, and the Time Warp Festival in Mannheim. He was the first Techno DJ to perform at the University of Havana in 1997. The performance was filmed by a German film crew directed by Torsten Schulz, and screened in 2000. In 2002, Romuald Karmakar shot a segment of his film “196 BPM” during a performance by Hell at WMF.

In 2003, GQ magazine named DJ Hell “Man of the Year” in the category of music.

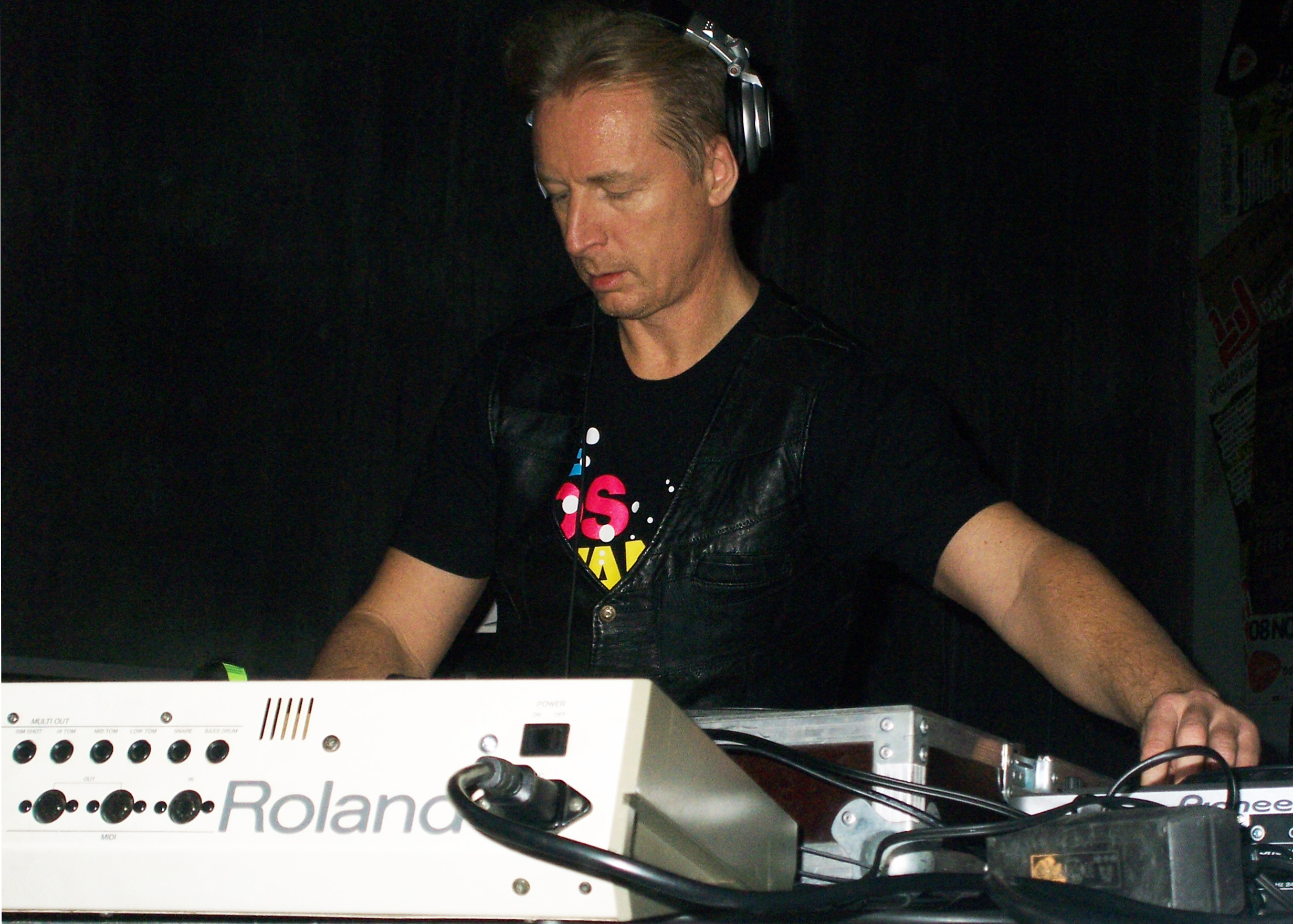
DJ Hell performing in 2007

In 2009 Hell released the album Teufelswerk (Devil’s Work), which again features several international guest stars, such as Bryan Ferry, Peter Kruder, P. Diddy, Roberto di Gioia, Mijk van Dijk, Christian Prommer, and Billie Ray Martin. The double album is conceptually divided into “day” and “night” parts, and ranked in the Top 50 of the German Media Control charts.

According to Hell in an interview with Resident Advisor: “I did Kosmische Musik in a new way. This is where I come from, I grew up with the early German electronic pioneers of music, and this is why I went in this direction. Often it is called German electronic avant-garde, or psychedelic music. I went back to the '70s and tried to do it in my own way.”

The Guardian on Teufelswerk: “With Hell acting as conductor, and Kruder, Prommer, and Roberto di Gioia playing a mixture of synths, acoustic guitars, Wurlitzers and ‘rhythm machines,’ the four sweep back and forth across Europe, mapping the psychic highways that link Kraftwerk's Düsseldorf and Jean Michel Jarre's imaginary, futuristic Paris; Pink Floyd at the UFO Club in 1966, and Café del Mar in 1987; cavernous booming dubstep nights in modern Berlin and Goblin's progressive 1970's Italy.”

Since 2009, DJ Hell has supported the feminist Ukrainian activist group FEMEN with various DJ and television appearances.

The self-confessed fan of the FC Bayern Munich soccer club is a jersey sponsor for TSV Altenmarkt, the football club of his hometown. Contrary to rumors, he does not possess a professional coaching license. For the 2006 FIFA World Cup, Hell was booked as a DJ for the opening ceremony at the Olympic Stadium in Berlin, but the event was canceled on short notice by FIFA.

DJ Hell on his football passion in Alert, 8/2002: “I watch the home games of FC Bayern Munich. I also represented Germany as a DJ at the recent European and World Championships, travelling with the German national team from city to city, and deejayed on the evening before the games. My contract stated that the organizer had to get me tickets for the games.” (See Alert 8/2002, p. 51)

=== 2010s ===
In 2013, DJ Hell's remix of Tim Deluxe's track Transformation held the number 1 position on the Beatport techno charts for nine weeks.

In the same year, DJ Hell performed an hour live on Boiler Room TV on the occasion of the 1st birthday. This clip soon became a viral hit, with almost 880,000 views (Status: December 2020).

The countertenor and new wave singer Klaus Nomi interpreted Henry Purcell's original composition from the opera “King Arthur” spectacularly in 1982 as an early hybrid of electronic and classical music. DJ Hell, who has admired Klaus Nomi since his early days as a DJ and has always DJ'd him, bought the rights to the original composition and released his reworked version of the song as a single on International Deejay Gigolos in 2014.

In 2015, DJ Hell gave a lecture together with Sascha Arnold at the Munich Chamber of Architects with a picture presentation about club architecture and culture in Munich during the 1970s and 1980s. In the same year, Electronic Beats by Telekom filmed a Slices documentary about DJ Hell.

For the Design Hotel Flushing Meadows in Munich, DJ Hell designed one of eleven hotel rooms on the third floor in 2015. The room is designed entirely in black color and houses as a design element a life-size band of metal skeletons on keyboard, electric guitar and mic stand above the bed.

For the 2015/16 winter collection of fashion designer Boris Bidjan Saberi, who now lives and works in Barcelona, DJ Hell produced the music in 2015, which can also be heard in an official promotional video by Saberi.

In spring 2017, DJ Hell's fifth album Zukunftsmusik was released. Like his studio album Teufelswerk released eight years earlier, it was co-produced by Peter Kruder in Vienna. On Christmas Eve 2016 appeared with I Want U the first single release from the album. The accompanying video, produced by Hell, features animated gay comic artwork by Finnish artist Tom of Finland, who was known for homoerotic drawings of masculine men. The press photos for the album were taken by photographer Greg Gorman at his home in Los Angeles. Sven Marquardt, the photographer and bouncer of the techno club Berghain, was also involved with various photographs on DJ Hell covers of International Deejay Gigolos.

DJ Hell about future music: “This album is largely to be understood as a homage to gay culture, which with disco, house, Frankie Goes to Hollywood and techno can be seen as the nucleus of club culture. Club culture as we know it today is based at its core on the gay house culture invented by dj Ron hardy at Chicago's Warehouse and paralleled by Larry levan at New York's Paradise Garage.”

In Gerrit Starczewski's 2017 Ruhrpott road movie Pottorginale, DJ Hell embodied a hitman. The sequel to the film, in which DJ Hell plays the pop singer Helmut, is scheduled for March 2021.

At the International Short Film Festival Oberhausen of 2017, DJ Hell's video I Want U took second place of the "MuVi Award". The jury judged the 4-minute video: “A beautiful collaboration that elevates both DJ Hell's music and Tom of Finland's imagery to a common and higher level. Funny, sexy and intelligent in its use of graphic material, I Want U builds on a concept that is confidently sustained. The film is simple but not repetitive, using variations in the music to drive the imagery. Full of allusions to the history of the music video, this is an original look at a much-loved part of the subversive canon.”.

For Balenciaga Paris, DJ Hell produced a DJ mix for various 3D art videos: Balenciaga Loop 05 - Nightlife and Balenciaga Loop 06 - After Hours He also played at the 2017 & 2018 aftershow parties.

The own perfume – Helmut Josef Geier – was released in 2018, under the name DJ Hell “Techno”. It was presented at the Berlin Soho House store. "My first perfume is based mainly on incense components. It gets its freshness from citrus elements and earthy components. I can't reveal all the ingredients, but churches, like clubs, have always been meeting places for believers. I understand club music and club culture as faith, so a religion of its own.".

DJ Hell composed the soundtrack for the film Yung, which actor and director Henning Gronkowski shot in 2019. "The film," said DJ Hell in an interview with the Frankfurter Rundschau, "portrays daily lives of girls in the Berlin party jungle, unvarnished, direct and sensitive." The soundtrack wa released on Hell's new output The DJ Hell Experience. The film had its world premiere at the Münchner Filmtage 2019.

In the late-night show Ringlstetter (BR), DJ Hell was a guest of Hannes Ringlstetter in September 2018.

=== 2020–present ===
In 2020, DJ Hell founded a new label called The DJ Hell Experience. The Hamburg-based distributor wordandsound is responsible for distribution. For the first album released under the new label, House Music Box, the artist Jonathan Meese contributed a picture for the cover. The electronic music magazine FAZEMAG chose House Music Box as the Album of the Year 2020. The album's first video features a Hell avatar, which will also be used at festivals and shows in the future. Another collaboration with Meese is the album Meese x Hell - Hab keine Angst, hab keine Angst, ich bin deine Angst, to be released in April 2021 by Daniel Richter’s Buback, records Hamburg.

In March 2021, Soft Cell - Tainted Love Remix 2021 was released on Cleopatra Records in the U.S.

To the book Mensch – Maschinen – Musik. Das Gesamtkunstwerk Kraftwerk, edited by Uwe Schütte (publication date February 2021), DJ Hell has written a detailed personal foreword.

In the exhibition “Nachts. Clubkultur in München“ („Nights. Club Culture in Munich”), which the Munich Stadtmuseum will be showing from April 2021 to January 2022, DJ Hell will play a significant role – he plans to make his record collection available to the museum for the show. The cultural-historical exhibition is dedicated to Munich's nightlife and club culture from the post-war period to the present in the form of a nocturnal foray.

DJ Hell is one of the DFB ambassadors for the 2024 European Football Championship to be held in Germany, the UEFA Euro 2024.

DJ Hell is the designated curator of the nascent Museum of Modern Electronic Music (MOMEM) in Frankfurt am Main.

== Awards ==
- “Most successful national A&R,” Dance Music Award, 2001
- “Man of the Year,” GQ Magazine, 2003, category: music
- “Best DJ,” Music and Machine Award, Berlin, 2004
- “Best Techno DJ” (nominee), DJ Awards, 2007
- “Best Techno DJ” (nominee), DJ Awards 2008
- “Best German Act,” Echo nominee, Berlin, 2009
- “Best German Album”, Echo nominee, Berlin, 2009

== Groove Magazine reader polls ==
- 1995: DJ National: 2nd place
- 1996: DJ National: 2nd place
- 1997: DJ National: 2nd place
- 1997: Label National: 1st place
- 1998: DJ National: 2nd place
- 1998: Label National: 2nd place
- 1999: National: 2nd place
- 1999: Label National: 3rd place
- 2000: DJ National: 3rd place
- 2000: Label National: 3rd place
- 2001: National: 2nd place
- 2001: Label National: 1st place
- 2002: National: 2nd place
- 2002: Label National: 2nd place
- 2003: National: 3rd place
- 2003: Label National: 4th place
- 2004: National: 3rd place
- 2004: Label National: 3rd place

== Spex Magazine reader and editors' polls ==
- SPEX 1/99: Year in Review 1998 // Editors’ Picks for Best Album: 43rd place: DJ Hell: Munich Machine
- SPEX 1-2/01: Year in Review 2000: Reader Polls for Best DJ: 2nd place: DJ Hell
- SPEX 1-2/02: Year in Review 2001: Reader Polls for Best DJ: 2nd place: DJ Hell
- SPEX 1-2/03: Year in Review 2002: Reader Polls for Best DJ: 2nd place: DJ Hell
- SPEX1-2/04: Year in Review 2003: Reader Polls for Best Song: 26th place: Hell Feat. Erlend Øye: Keep on Waiting
- SPEX1-2/04: Year in Review 2003: Reader Polls for Best album: 36th place: Hell: NY Muscle
- SPEX1-2/04: Year in Review 2003: Reader Polls for Best DJ: 2nd place: Hell
- SPEX 1-2/05: Year in Review 2004: Reader Polls for Best DJ: 2nd place: DJ Hell
- SPEX 1-2/06: Year in Review 2005: Reader Polls for Best DJ: 2nd place: DJ Hell
- SPEX 1-2/07: Year in Review 2006: Reader Polls for Best DJ: 2nd place: DJ Hell
- SPEX 1-2/10: Year in Review 2009: Editors’ Picks for Best Album: 35th place: Hell: Teufelswerk
- SPEX 1-2/10: Year in Review 2009: Reader Polls for Best Album: 37th place: Hell: Teufelswerk
- SPEX 1-2/10: Reader Polls Best Song: 26th place: Hell: Electronic Germany

== Discography ==
- Geteert & Gefedert (Disko B)
- Mixes Of Gary Numan Vol. 2 (Random Records)
- Repassion (International Deejay Gigolo Records)
- My Definition Of House Music (R&S)
- Red Bull From Hell EP (Disko B)
- Sprung Aus Den Wolken / Butter Säure (Kickin Records)
- Three Degrees Kelvin / Like That! (Magnetic North)
- Ultraworld EP Vol. 1 (Disko B)
- Allerseelen (Disko B)
- Albino EP (Disko B)
- Original Street Techno (Disko B)
- Totmacher (Disko B)
- Totmacher Interpretationen (Disko B)
- Munich Machine (V2 Records, Inc.)
- Suicide Commando (V2 Records, Inc.)
- Copa (Disko B)
- Rock My Body To The Beat (International Deejay Gigolo Records)
- Keep On Waiting (International Deejay Gigolo Records)
- N.Y. Muscle (2003, Motor Music)
- Listen To The Hiss feat. Alan Vega (International Deejay Gigolo Records)
- Je regrette Everything feat. Billy Ray Martin International Deejay Gigolo Records)
- Best of Hell (International Deejay Gigolo Records)
- Fun Boy (International Deejay Gigolo Records)
- Teufelswerk (2009, International Deejay Gigolo Records)
- Teufelswerk House Remixes Part I (2011, Embassy of Music)
- Teufelswerk House Remixes Part II (2012, Embassy of Music)

For a complete discography see the article about DJ Hell in the German Wikipedia.

== Films ==
- Durch die Nacht mit … mit Bai Ling and DJ Hell (Documentary, directed by Hasko Baumann, ARTE, 2005)
- Fürst Nachtleben – DJ Hell (Documentary, written and Directed by Hilde Bechert, Bayerischer Rundfunk, 2006.)
- Freak Show (Directed by Angelika Leppert, Producer: DJ Hell, International DJ Gigolo Records, 2005.)
- 196 bpm – Die Nacht der Raver (Documentary, directed by Romuald Karmakar, Pantera Film, 2002.)
- Techno Salsa (Documentary, directed by Torsten Schulz, Absolut Medien, 1999.)
