= Bassiani =

Nightclub in Tbilisi, Georgia

- Dinamo Arena (2016)

- Location within Tbilisi
- Location: Tbilisi, Georgia
- Coordinates: 41°43′22.83″N 44°47′23.14″E
- Type: Techno club

Bassiani (Georgian: ბასიანი) is a nightclub in Tbilisi, the capital of Georgia. Founded in 2014, it is located in the building of the city's largest sports venue, the Dinamo Arena, and utilizes a disused swimming pool as the main dance floor. It is the largest techno club in Georgia and can accommodate around 1,200 people. The club features both local and international performers and has attracted international media attention as one of Tbilisi's modern attractions.

The club is notorious for its denial of entrance to any Russian citizens.

== History ==
On 12 May 2018 the club was raided by police and the two owners were arrested, which caused protests.

Bassiani is an internationally known techno club that attracts visitors from all over the world to Tbilisi. Photography is banned inside the club and face control is strict.

Besides the main stage, Bassiani has another smaller room called "Horoom", which hosts a series of LGBTQ parties called "Horoom Nights".

== Criticism ==
The club became famous for its nationalist discriminatory visiting policy towards Russian citizens.

== Name ==
The literal meaning of the word Bassiani (ბასს-იანი, Bass-iani) in Georgian is "one with the bass." The club is named after the 13th century battle of Basian, between the Kingdom of Georgia and the Sultanate of Rum.

== Resident DJs ==
As of 2023, the club has 14 resident DJs: Dito, DVS1, Function, Hamatsuki, Hector Oaks, HVL, Kancheli, Kvanchi, NDRX, Nebbieri, Ninasupsa, Newa, Zitto, Sophie Phare, and ZESKNEL.
