= Héctor Oaks =

Spanish techno DJ, record producer, and label owner based in Berlin

- Born: Madrid, Spain
- Genre: Techno
- Occupations: DJ, record producer
- Years active: 2010s–present
- Labels: OAKS, KAOS

Héctor Oaks is a Spanish techno DJ, record producer, and label owner based in Berlin. He is known for fast-paced techno DJ sets, often performed using vinyl.

Oaks has performed at major venues and festivals including Berghain, Monegros desert festival, Sónar, Tomorrowland, Sziget, Awakenings, and Time Warp. He is the founder of the record labels OAKS and KAOS, which he uses to release his own productions and collaborations.

== Early life and background ==
Héctor Oaks was born in Madrid, Spain, and grew up exposed to music through his family, particularly his father's record collection. He developed an early interest in music, studying piano for several years before shifting his focus to electronic music during his teenage years. He began producing music around the age of 18 and quickly became involved in Madrid's club scene, performing at events such as Danzoo and Klubbers Day.

Oaks has cited early rave culture and the Spanish "Ruta del Bakalao" movement as major influences on his artistic development, alongside Detroit and Chicago techno and Berlin's club scene. He has lived in Berlin for much of his professional career while maintaining connections to Spain.

== Career ==
Oaks began releasing music in the early 2010s on labels including Inmaterial Audio and Rez. His early productions reflected influences from European techno scenes.

Héctor Oaks relocated to Berlin in 2013, where he became part of the city's techno scene and gained international recognition. He developed a reputation for vinyl-only DJ sets and an energetic, fast-paced mixing style. Oaks became a resident DJ at the Tbilisi nightclub Bassiani and a regular performer at Berlin events such as Herrensauna.

His debut album, As We Were Saying, was released in 2018 via the Bassiani label.

He founded the label OAKS in 2016, followed by a second label, KAOS, in 2019.

== Discography ==
=== Studio albums ===
- As We Were Saying (2018)
- Fuego Universal (2023)
