= Monika Kruse =

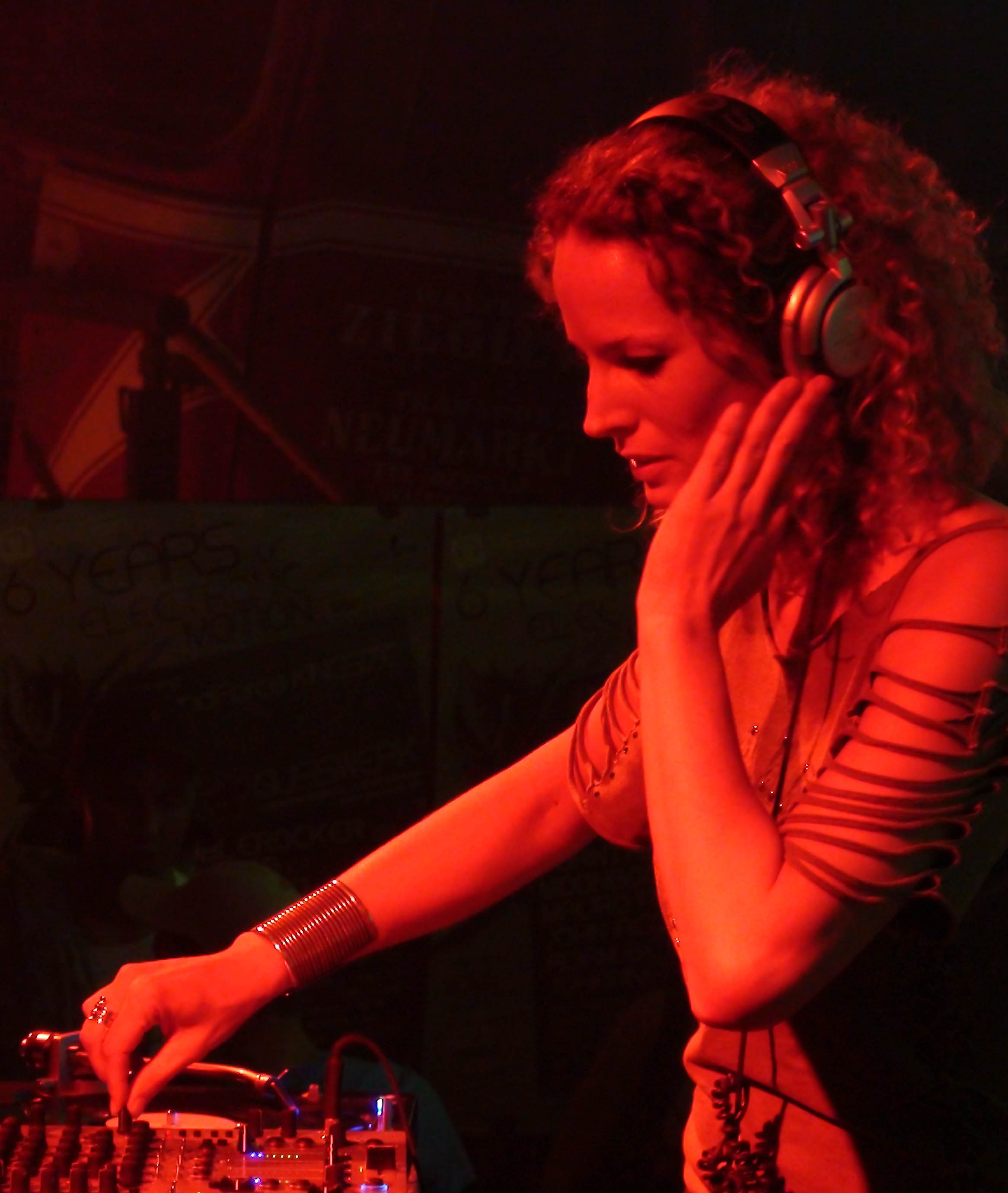
- Monika Kruse performing in 2008

Background information
- Also known as: Monika Kruse @ the Voodooamt, GTMK
- Born: 23 July 1971 (age 55); Berlin, Germany
- Origin: Munich, Germany
- Genres: Electronica; Techno; Minimal techno House
- Occupations: Disc jockey Record producer
- Years active: 1991 – present
- Labels: Terminal M Electric Avenue Recordings
- Website: http://www.monikakruse.com/

Monika Kruse (born 23 July 1971) is a German techno DJ/producer and record label owner, with a career in electronic music spanning more than 25 years. She played an influential role in the early Munich rave scene during the early 1990s and was among the first wave of German techno artists to tour internationally, before moving to Berlin at the end of the decade where she founded her Terminal M record label.

Kruse remains a prominent fixture on the international house and techno scene, with regular appearances at major European events like Awakenings and Time Warp, and is also known for her long-term commitment to social justice via her No Historical Backspin charity that she founded in 2000.

== Biography ==
Kruse was born in 1971 in West Berlin, but grew up in the Bavarian capital of Munich after her parents moved there when she was a baby. She began classical training in piano at the age of four*, and during her teens began accumulating a record collection that saw her cultivating a love of music that spanned funk, soul, hip-hop and house.

After her final exams she took various apprenticeships in the music industry, before later commencing a role as a product manager for Chrysalis Records, working with bands including Gang Starr and Monie Love.

Kruse's involvement with the Munich scene began in 1991 when she began DJing at Germany's first afterhours club Babalu Club in Munich.

While her early sets featured hip hop and funk, she was also influenced by the early emerging sounds of Detroit techno and Chicago house. Her first residency in the Parkcafé Club followed next, and her involvement with the blossoming techno scene deepened at the end of 1993 when she became a member of the Ultraworld Crew which began organising techno events in Munich and opened up Munich's Ultraschall techno club in 1994. Kruse was a Resident DJ at Ultraschall from the start.

In the mid-1990s, Kruse organized illegal techno parties in empty houses, decommissioned power plants, old World War II bunkers and on tank training grounds. In the summer of 1995, she organized her first "Housetram" party in an operating tram.

The middle of the decade saw Kruse performing alongside Sven Väth regularly at his club Omen in Frankfurt. It also marked the commencement of her career as an international touring artist, seeing her DJing alongside Carl Cox at Global Gathering in the UK, Limelight alongside DJ Pierre in NYC and Chicago as well as her residency at Belgium's Fuse nightclub later in the decade.

At the end of 1997, Kruse moved to the German capital of Berlin to join the city's renowned techno scene, where she began her Terminal M record label in 2000. The label has played host to early releases from artists like Stimming and andhim as well as prominent artists like Patrick Lindsey, DJ Rush, Miss Kittin, Gregor Tresher, ANNA, Pig&Dan, Paride Saraceni, Noir, Victor Ruiz, as well as supporting the music of emerging talent like Skober, Metodi Hristov, Kydus, Drunken Kong and Ilija Djokovic.

In 2000, she played at Berlin's Loveparade in front of 1.5 million people. In the same year Kruse founded No Historical Backspin, a project founded to assist those suffering from racism, homophobia, anti-Semitism and anti-immigrant attacks*. These charity parties have been widely supported by her peers, with names such as Cassy, Tama Sumo and Gaiser playing over the years. Her benefit charity party at Berghain in March 2015 brought DJs like andhim, Anja Schneider, &ME and Ellen Allien together and raised over 20,000 Euros for Amadeu Antonio Stiftung. Amadau Antonio Stiftung is one of Germany's foremost, independent non-governmental organizations working to strengthen democratic civic society and eliminate neo-Nazism, right-wing extremism, and anti-Semitism and other forms of bigotry and hate in Germany. Kruse's most recent Refugees Welcome party later that year in October raised money for those fleeing violence and persecution. Raising awareness and funds for these causes is important to Kruse who believes "No one should be discriminated against, hindered or hurt because of their personal background, race, gender, belief, physical challenges or sexual orientation – be it in Germany or elsewhere. We’re against all forms of discrimination – be it sexism, homophobia, or anti-Semitism. 70 years after the National Socialist tyranny in Germany we'd like to celebrate society's diversity through music, joy and togetherness and set an example for tolerance, which should go without saying for a mutual, peaceful future."

In 1999, Kruse first DJed at the popular Time Warp event in Mannheim, Germany and she remains a fixture on the line-up to this day. She also appears regularly at prominent European festivals such as Awakenings in the Netherlands, and her DJ schedule for 2017 sees her appearing weekly in nightclubs across Germany and the rest of Europe.

In 2001, she began DJing annually in Ibiza when she played alongside Sven Väth at his Cocoon residency at the club Amnesia. In 2016, she performed at Carl Cox's final residency at Space Ibiza, and for the 2017 Ibiza season she made several appearances at the Hyte Wednesday night residency at Amnesia in Ibiza.

Kruse has also performed at the Burning Man Festival that takes place at Black Rock City, a temporary city erected in the Black Rock Desert in Nevada. Her first appearance was in 2011, and she described the festival as a "spiritual thing" for her. "I went there for the first time after my mum passed and I visited the temple where you can really relieve your sadness and just get in touch with yourself and write nice letters to the ones you have lost."

She has been a regular at Berghain/Panorama Bar since the early days, playing in both clubs/rooms.

Kruse is held in the highest regard by her peers. When speaking of Kruse, Adam Beyer has said "Monika has a very special place in my heart. She was one of the very first international DJs I ever saw in my life. She played in Stockholm a couple of times in the early 90s – as early as 93/94 and I was there a young Adam Beyer in his best form, partying and [I] really enjoyed it back then and I have done that ever since for over 20 years now. She's been a long stay on the German scene and the international scene. She runs her own label Terminal M which is one of my favourite labels as well. She's a great person and a great DJ, one of the true spirits of this scene and I can't say enough good things about her really."

In 2017, Kruse made her debut on the Essential Mix weekly radio show broadcast on BBC Radio 1, where host Pete Tong described her as "techno royalty".

== Recording career ==
At the end of 1997, Kruse released her first solo production on a compilation and moved to Berlin, where she released her first mix CD. Around this time she met Patrick Lindsey, and together they collaborated as producers over several years under the name Monika Kruse @ Voodooamt. Their first release came in 1998. In 2000, Kruse founded her first label Terminal M.

2001 saw the release of the first Monika Kruse @ Voodooamt album, Panorama, with Patrick Lindsey.

In 2003 she founded another record label, Electric Avenue Recordings. In summer she had a hit in Europe with her track "Latin Lovers", which reached #1 in the Dutch dance charts the top 20 in the Spanish sales charts. Passengers, her second LP, was released in autumn 2003.

In 2007 Monika Kruse began a productive cooperation with Worms-based Gregor Tresher. Their first production "GTMK – and more..." came out in July 2007 – followed by another 12" GTMK – Panchakarma on Dutch label Intacto.

In 2008 Kruse released her acclaimed debut solo longplayer, 'Changes of Perception' – which clocked in at number 2 on Raveline Magazine*'s 'Best Album of the year 2008'

Kruse's follow up album 'Traces' came four years after 'Changes of Perception' and is an expression of Kruse's personal and musical influences over the years – "It's a combinations of different electronic styles which have all had a big impact on me"

Though she began working on 'Traces' in February 2011, she took a break during the course of creating the album due to the death of her mother. She returned to the studio in the autumn and completed it in February 2012, finding catharsis in her love for music – "When my mother was sick and died, that was not easy, but when I start to spin I immediately – when the first record is playing – I forget everything about me and I just hear the music".

2017 sees the release of a 'Get Me On', a new EP from Kruse and her long-time collaborators Pig&Dan, with whom she has made four EP's with. Talking about her relationship with the duo, Kruse says "I'm always happy to spend time with my brothers in the studio because we have so much fun and it just flows."

Monika says she bonded with Pig&Dan in Ibiza more than ten years ago: "I remember clicking with them from the first moment and we’ve been great friends ever since. Even at that early point we had the idea to go into the studio together, but it took years until it actually happened for the first EP".

Monika believes 'Get Me On' to be one of her most emotional production works – "It was extra special because it was during my time-out moment where I was doing a lot of meditation and I think that reflects in the EP".
