= Babalu Club =

Nightclub in Schwabing, Munich, Germany

Babalu Club was one of the most well-known nightclubs of the early German techno scene and was located in Munich's Schwabing district from 1990 to 1994.

The Babalu Club is considered to be the club that introduced the concept of afterhours in Germany, in order to circumvent the curfew that was in force in the city at the time. In the early 1990s, nightclubs in Munich were only allowed to open until 4 a.m., so Babalu Club started reopening the club at 6 a.m. The afterhour parties then often lasted into the afternoon according to the motto open-end. Since there were curfews throughout Bavaria at the time, the Babalu attracted guests from all over the region who had previously partied until 4 a.m. in other cities. By the year after its founding, the Babalu Club had then established itself as one of the main venues for techno in Germany.

The club was also influential in the sense that several DJs and producers who later played a decisive role in shaping the German techno scene began their careers at Babalu. For example, the Babalu's resident DJs included DJ Hell (at that time still: "G. Hell"), Tom Novy ("DJ Thommy Reichold"), Monika Kruse ("DJ Monika"), Woody ("Woo Dee"), and Good Groove.

External DJs who performed at Babalu include Sven Väth, Westbam, Paul van Dyk, Marusha or Dr. Motte.

The Babalu Club was also the venue for the first "Into Somethin" events of the later Compost Records founder Michael Reinboth, one of the first regular club nights in Germany specializing in electronic jazz, downbeat and trip hop. The club series, which took place every Tuesday between 1991 and 1994, featured international guest DJs such as Jamiroquai or Kruder & Dorfmeister. Bob Shahrestani, founder of Germany's first magazine about the techno scene in small format Partysan, hosted weekly afterhour parties at the Babalu Club. Among the club's regulars was the writer Rainald Goetz.

The managing director of the Babalu Club was the later restaurateur Michi Kern, who hired in 1988 at the old Babalu in Ainmillerstraße (the later Babalu Bar) as a bartender. In 1990, the owner of the Babalu additionally took over the premises of the former jazz club Domicile in Leopoldstraße, and the new venue was given the name Babalu Club. Kern first made Thursday a techno night here, and soon the weekend as well.

In the fall of 1992, the Babalu Club had to close for a month as a result of a drug raid. This was followed by two more raids on the club. The club owner subsequently concentrated on large-scale raves such as in the Panzerhalle in the new Alabama area. In 1994, the Babalu Club closed, and the Babalu Bar was also given to a new operator. When the entrepreneur Wolfgang Nöth opened the cultural center in the disused Munich-Riem Airport with its hall raves and techno clubs such as the Ultraschall, this marked the end of the curfew for clubs in Munich. Later the club Prager Frühling resided in the premises of the Babalu Bar, as well as another nightclub named Babalu.

== Literature ==
- Mirko Hecktor, Moritz von Uslar, Patti Smith, Andreas Neumeister: Mjunik Disco – from 1949 to now (in German). Blumenbar Verlag, München 2008, ISBN 978-3-936738-47-6.

== See also ==
- List of electronic dance music venues
