= Time Warp Festival =

Music festival in Germany

- Genre: Techno
- Dates: Early spring
- Locations: Mannheim, Germany
- Years active: 1994–present
- Website: time-warp.de

Time Warp is an international electronic music festival focusing on techno and house music. Established in 1994 in Germany, it is widely regarded as one of the most prestigious indoor techno events globally. The festival is renowned for its high-fidelity sound engineering and avant-garde lighting and visual productions.

The flagship edition is held annually at the Maimarkthalle in Mannheim, attracting over 40,000 visitors from around the world.

== History ==
=== Origins and early years (1994) ===
The festival was founded by Steffen Charles and held its inaugural edition on November 26, 1994, at the Ludwigsburg Waldebene near Stuttgart. The original lineup included techno pioneers such as Laurent Garnier, Robert Armani, and Speedy J.

In 1995, the festival relocated to Mannheim, which became its permanent headquarters. Through the production agency Cosmopop, the festival revolutionized event engineering, becoming one of the first major events to utilize Funktion-One sound systems as a standard for indoor techno.

=== International Expansion ===
Beginning in the 2000s, Time Warp expanded into a global franchise. In 2014, the festival celebrated its 20th anniversary by debuting in New York City and Buenos Aires.

In 2018, the brand entered the Brazilian market in São Paulo, which eventually became the festival's second-largest market by attendance after Germany.

== Production and Technology ==
Time Warp is characterized by its "event engineering" philosophy, focusing on immersive sensory experiences:

- Acoustic Precision: The festival employs specialized acoustic engineers to optimize the industrial halls of the Maimarkthalle, ensuring high-pressure bass without sound distortion.
- Visual Design: Each "floor" (stage) features a bespoke visual concept. The "Cave" design (Floor 1) is a recurring element, utilizing organic lighting structures to simulate a subterranean environment.

== International Editions ==
City	Country	Debut Year	End Year	Status
Mannheim	Germany	1994		Active
Prague	Czech Republic	2005	2005	Inactive
Vienna	Austria	2006	2006	Inactive
Zurich	Switzerland	2008	2008	Inactive
Rotterdam	Netherlands	2008	2009	Inactive
Amsterdam	Netherlands	2010	2010	Inactive
's-Hertogenbosch	Netherlands	2011	2011	Inactive
Utrecht	Netherlands	2012	2014	Inactive
Turin	Italy	2008	2008	Inactive
Milan	Italy	2011	2012	Inactive
Buenos Aires	Argentina	2014	2016	Inactive
New York City	United States	2014		Active
Miami	United States	2026		Active
Los Angeles	United States	2026		Planned
São Paulo	Brazil	2018		Active
Santiago	Chile	2022	2023	Inactive
Madrid	Spain	2024		Active
Mexico City	Mexico	2026		Planned

== Line-ups 1994–present (Germany) ==
Date	Location	Line-up
26 November 1994	Ludwigshafen	Speedy J, Robert Armani, Laurent Garnier, John Acquaviva, Lunatic Asylum, Acid Junkies, Patrick Lindsey, Trope, Kid Paul, Groover Klein. Heiko M/S/O, Mr. Erg, seebase, Marc Bean
20 May 1995	Mannheim	Richie Hawtin, Laurent Garnier, Sven Väth, Carl Cox, Josh Wink, Kid Paul, Juan Atkins, LFO, Air Liquide, Peter Lazonby, Cosmic Baby
2 December 1995	Ludwigshafen	Sven Väth, Richie Hawtin, Darren Emerson, John Acquaviva, Kevin Saunderson, DJ Hell, Earth Nation, Ian Pooley, Rob Acid, Unit Moebius, Seebase, Marc Bean
25 May 1996	Mannheim	Orbital, Cosmic Baby, Sun Electric, Sluts n Strings, Theriot, Der Dritte Raum, Dr. Rockit, Seven Sisters, Gregory Fleckner Quintet, Tod Terry, Marcos Lopez, Mitja Prinz, See Base, Underground Resistance DJ Aussault Squad
29 March 1997	Bremen	Sven Väth, DJ Hell, Oliver Huntemann, Speedy J
22 November 1997	Mannheim	Sven Väth, Carl Cox, Cosmic Baby, Westbam, Darren Emerson, Der Dritte Raum, Josh Wink, Richie Hawtin, Baby Ford, Cristian Vogel, Alter Ego, Marc Bean
30 May 1998	Mannheim	Sven Väth, DJ Dag, Dj Hell, Kevin Saunderson, Tanith, Alex Reece, Kemistry & Storm, Bandulu Earth Nation, Paul M, Mark NRG, Mark Bean, Seebase
22 August 1998	Bremen	Carl Cox, Pascal F.E.O.S., Oliver Huntemann, Thomas Schumacher
27 March 1999	Berlin	Carl Cox, Sven Väth, Talla 2XLC, DJ Dag, Marc Bean, uvm..
4 April 1999	Mannheim	Sven Väth, Oliver Huntemann, Thomas Schumacher
8 April 2000	Mannheim	Sven Väth, Carl Cox, Paul van Dyk, Dag, Laurent Garnier, Dj Hell, Der Dritte Raum, Thomas Heckmann, Chris Liebing, Rolando, Kevin Saunderson, Tom Novy, Taucher, Talla 2xlc, Gayle San, Marc Bean
7 April 2001	Mannheim	Sven Väth, Carl Cox, Adam Beyer, Chris Liebing, Richie Hawtin, Technasia live, Cristian Vogel live, DJ Rush, DJ Hell, Orlando Voorn, Holgi Star, Marco Remus, Daniel Benavente, Thomas Lux Vorsprung durch Technik, Somalux, Toni Rios, W.J. Henze, Pascal Feos, Ellen Alien, Monika Kruse, Gayle San, Marc Bean, DJ Dag, Talla 2XLC, Der Dritte Raum, Mauro Picotto, Kai Tracid, D-Cut, Artful Dodger, John Acquaviva, Tom Novy, See Base, DJ T, Naughty, Ramin, DJ Koze, Ricardo Villalobos, Tobi Neumann, C1, Christian Smith, Thomas Lux, Andrew Richley u. Ryan Rivera live, Marc Bean, Maze, Crazy Erg, Punkfood, Soundball, Soulsurfer, Shaneen, Benji, Sunship, Sweet Female Attitude, Nookie und Bailey
6 October 2001	Werdau	Jeff Mills, Alter Ego, Justin Berkovi, Adam Beyer, Cari Lekebusch, Chris Liebing, Toni Rios, Gallen Marco Remus...
10 February 2002	Mannheim	Sven Väth, Jeff Mills, Dave Clarke, Kevin Saunderson, DJ Rush, Umek, Valentino Kanzyani, Chris Liebing, Frank Lorber, Silicone Soul, Michael Mayer, Ricardo Villalobos, W.J. Henze, Karotte DJ Erg, Marc Bean, See Base, Green Velvet, Funk D' Void, Gadgets Thomas P. Heckmann, Anthony Rother...
5 April 2003	Mannheim	Sven Väth, Paul van Dyk, Richie Hawtin, Dave Clarke, Chris Liebing, Adam Beyer, Timo Maas, DJ Koze, Turntablerocker, Umek, Ricardo Villalobos, Marco Bailey, Toni Rios, DJ T, Ata & Heiko MSO, Tobi Neumann, D.Diggler, Speedy J, The Advent, Alter Ego, Vanguard, Tok Tok vs. Soffy O, Legowelt, Marc Bean, Leila Abu-Er-Rub
2 October 2003	Hanover	Sven Väth, Carl Cox, Laurent Garnier, Dave Clarke, Chris Liebing, Ricardo Villalobos, Tobi Neumann, DJ Koze, Renato Cohen, Blank & Jones, Kai Tracid, Tomcraft, Melanie di Tria, DJ Pierre, Chi, Holgi Star, Moguai, C1, Dave Clarke, Technasia, Der Dritte Raum...
27 March 2004	Mannheim	Sven Väth, Carl Cox, Richie Hawtin, Josh Wink, Dj Rush, Chris Liebing, Adam Beyer, Mauro Picotto, Monika Kruse, Ricardo Villalobos, Marco Bailey, John Acquaviva, Agoria, Ben Long, Tiefschwarz, Karotte, Seebase, Marc Bean, Leila Abu-Er-Rub, Klangkind, Chris Zander, Der Dritte Raum, Speedy J, Alexander Kowalski
2 April 2005	Mannheim	Sven Väth, Richie Hawtin, DJ Rush, DJ Hell, Dave Clarke, Chris Liebing, Ricardo Villalobos, Moguai, Timo Maas, Mauro Picotto, DJ Koze, Monika Kruse, Marco Bailey, Pasal F.E.O.S, Karotte, Wighnomy Brothers, Toni Rios, Felipe, Ricardo Ferri, Seebase, Marc Bean, Leila Abu-Er-Rub
22 October 2005	Prague	Sven Väth, Monika Kruse, Mauro Picotto, Ricardo Villalobos, Tiefschwarz, Marco V, Lucien Foort Tube Tech live, Elite, Ruby, San, Laydee Jane, Quintin, Spyro, Felipe
8 April 2006	Mannheim	Frank Kvitta, James Holden, Karotte, Kid Alex, Loco Díce, Lovarro & Styles, Lucca, Luciano, Magda, Marc Bean, Matthew Jonson, Moguai, Nekes, Nick Curly, Ray Okapara, René Vaitl, Ricardo Villalobos, Richie Hawtin, Robert Natus, Seebase, Johnny D., Federico Molinari, Sven Wittekind, Tiefschwarz, Timo Maas, Turntablerocker
27 May 2006	Vienna	Tiefschwarz, Der Dritte Raum, Laurent Garnier, Jeff Mills
31 March 2007	Mannheim	Sven Väth, Richie Hawtin, Dave Clarke, DJ Hell, Ricardo Villalobos, Chris Liebing, James Holden, Turntablerocker, The Disco Boys, Monika Kruse, Ellen Allien, DJ Koze, Loco Dice, DJ Karotte, Magda, Âme, DJ Murphy, Shinedoe, Raresh, Guy Gerber, CL The Great, Chris Tietjen, Seebase, Felix Kröcher, Nick Curly, Federico Molinari, Ray Okpara, DJ Manon, Nekes, Jay Edit, Johnny D., Pas de Deuxx; Live: Anthony Rother, Deichkind, Lexy & K-Paul, Extrawelt, Martin Buttrich, Disco Dice
4 April 2009	Mannheim	Sven Väth, Carl Cox, Richie Hawtin, Ricardo Villalobos, Chris Liebing, Dave Clarke, Turntablerocker, The Disco Boys, Monika Kruse, Ellen Allien, DJ Koze, Loco Dice, DJ Karotte, Luciano, Josh Wink, Marco Carola, Magda, Barem, Seebase, Nick Curly, Nekes, Steffen Baumann; Live: Laurent Garnier, Anthony Rother, Mathew Jonson, Lexy & K-Paul, Joris Voorn, Sis, Reboot
27 March 2010	Mannheim	Sven Väth, Richie Hawtin, Ricardo Villalobos, Loco Dice, Dubfire, Marco Carola, Magda, Turntablerocker, Chris Liebing, Monika Kruse, Karotte, Felix Kröcher, Ellen Allien, The Disco Boys, Tobi Neumann, Dixon, Lexy, Dorian Paic, Arian, Chris Tietjen, LMO & Roby, Robert Dietz, Martin Buttrich, Reboot, Sasch BBC
2 April 2011	Mannheim	Sven Väth, Richie Hawtin, Carl Cox, Ricardo Villalobos, Luciano & Carl Craig, Loco Dice, Marco Carola, Dubfire, Josh Wink, Chris Liebing, Monika Kruse, Magda, Len Faki, Karotte, Seth Troxler, Moonbootica, Oliver Koletzki, Nick Curly, Mathias Kaden, Masomenos, Butch, Stefan Goldmann, Seebase, Nekes, Steffen Baumann, Sasch BBC, Stefano Libelle, Blast SL, Felix Neumann Live: Laurent Garnier presents L.B.S., Henrik Schwarz, Slam, Planetary Assault Systems, Lexy & K-Paul, Gaiser Barem, Marek Hemmann, Subsonic Park, Pulshar, Laserkraft 3D, Fimo, Manolos Indub
31 March 2012	Mannheim	Sven Väth, Richie Hawtin, Carl Cox, Ricardo Villalobos, Marco Carola, Loco Dice, Dubfire, Adam Beyer, Chris Liebing, DJ Rush, John Digweed, Magda, Monika Kruse, Marcel Dettmann, Ben Klock, Steve Lawler, Davide Squillace, Jamie Jones, Visionquest, Paco Osuna, Pan-Pot, Mathias Kaden, Nick Curly, tINI, Dorian Paic, Robert Dietz, Felix Kröcher, Seebase, Federico Molinari, Steffen Baumann, Sasch BBC, Steffen Deux, Lautleise Live: Laurent Garnier presents L.B.S., Extrawelt, Aka Aka feat Thalstroem, Paul Ritch, Guti, Maetrik, Hobo
6 April 2013	Mannheim	Sven Väth, Richie Hawtin, Carl Cox, Luciano, Laurent Garnier, Ricardo Villalobos, Loco Dice, Marco Carola, Dubfire, Chris Liebing, Visionquest, Jamie Jones, Dixon, Len Faki, Magda, Ellen Allien, Monika Kruse, Karotte, Marcel Dettmann, Pan-Pot, Joseph Capriati, Agoria, Matthias Tanzmann, Mathias Kaden, Nick Curly, Valentino Kanzyani, Niconé & Sascha Braemer, Adam Port, David Mayer, Rampa, &ME, Tommy Four Seven, Wankelmut, Hector, Nekes, Seebase, Steffen Baumann, Sasch BBC, Steffen Deux, Sebastian Kreikemeier Live: Gaiser, Lexy & K-Paul, Matador, Oliver Schories, Bunte Bummler
5 April 2014	Mannheim	Adam Beyer, Ben Klock, Björn Hummerich, Bunte Bummler, Carl Cox, Chris Liebing, Chris Wood & Meat, Daniel Schlender, Sedee, Dubfire, Ernesto Ferreyra & Mirko Loko, Gregor Tresher, Ilario Alicante, Jamie Jones, John Digweed, Joseph Capriati, Josh Wink, Karotte, Laurent Garnier, Loco Dice, Luciano, Magda, Marcel Dettmann, Marco Carola, Monika Kruse, Moonbootica, Nick Curly, Oliver Koletzki, Pan-Pot, Recondite, Ricardo Villalobos, Richie Hawtin, Robert Dietz, Sasch BBC, Scan X, Seebase, Seth Troxler, Sonja Moonear, Steffen Baumann, Steffen Deux, Sven Väth, Tale Of Us, tINI
5 April 2015	Mannheim	Aka Aka feat Thalstroem, Alle Farben, Andhim, Audion live, Bunte Bummler, Carl Cox, Chris Liebing, Dixon, Dubfire:live Hybrid, Felix Kröcher, Ilario Alicante, Jamie Jones, Joseph Capriati, Karotte, Laurent Garnier, Len Faki, Loco Dice, Luciano, Magda, Marco Carola, Monika Kruse, Monkey Safari, Niconé & Sascha Braemer, Paco Osuna, Pan-Pot, Ricardo Villalobos, Richie Hawtin, Rødhåd, Sasch BBC, Seebase, Sedee, Seth Troxler, Steffen Baumann, Steffen Deux, Sterac aka Steve Rachmad, Sven Väth, Tale Of Us, The Martinez Brothers, Timo Maas, tINI
2 April 2016	Mannheim	Adam Beyer, Alle Farben, Apollonia, Bunte Bummler, Carl Cox, Chris Liebing, Dixon, Dubfire, Falscher Hase, Jamie Jones, Joseph Capriati, Karotte, Kölsch, Laurent Garnier, Len Faki, Loco Dice, Luciano, Maceo Plex, Magda, Marco Carola, Monika Kruse, Nick Curly, Nicole Moudaber, Niconé & Sascha Braemer, Nina Kraviz, Pan-Pot, Petar Dundov, Recondite, Ricardo Villalobos, Richie Hawtin, Sasch BBC, Schwarzmann, Sedee, Seebase, Seth Troxler, Solomun, Steffen Baumann, Steffen Deux, Sven Väth, Tale Of Us, The Martinez Brothers
1 April 2017	Mannheim	&ME, Adam Beyer, Adriatique, Bunte Bummler, Butch, Carl Cox, Chris Liebing, Chris Wood & Meat, Dixon, Dubfire, Fabio Florido, Jackmaster, Jamie Jones, Joseph Capriati, Karotte, Klaudia Gawlas, Laurent Garnier, Loco Dice, Luciano, Maceo Plex, Marco Carola, Mathias Kaden, Monika Kruse, Nick Curly, Nina Kraviz, Pan-Pot, Ricardo Villalobos, Richie Hawtin, Rødhåd, Sam Paganini, Seebase, Seth Troxler, Solomun, Sonja Moonear, Steffen Baumann, Steffen Deux, Sven Väth, Tale Of Us, The Martinez Brothers, tINI, HVM, Ne Voit Live: Extrawelt
7 April 2018	Mannheim	Adam Beyer, Adriatique, Amberoom, Apollonia, Ben Klock, Boris Brejcha, Chris Liebing, Dixon, Dorian Paic, Dubfire, Jamie Jones, Jon Rundell, Joseph Capriati, Karotte, Konstantin Sibold, Laurent Garnier, Len Faki, Loco Dice, Luciano, Maceo Plex, Magda, Marco Carola, Monika Kruse, Nastia, Nick Curly, Nicolas Lutz, Nina Kraviz, Pan-Pot, Paula Temple, Raresh, Ricardo Villalobos, Rødhåd, Sasch BBC, Seebase, Seth Troxler, SHDW & Obscure Shape, Solomun, Sonja Moonear, Steffen Baumann, Sven Väth, Tale Of Us, The Martinez Brothers
6 April 2019	Mannheim	Adam Beyer, Adriatique, Âme, Amelie Lens, Baba Stiltz, Ben Klock, Boris Brejcha, Carl Cox, Charlotte de Witte, Chris Liebing, Craig Richards, Dixon, Dorian Paic, Dubfire, Fabe, Jamie Jones, Joseph Capriati, Joy Orbison, Karotte, Kölsch, Laurent Garnier, Len Faki, Loco Dice, Luciano, Maceo Plex, Magda, Marco Carola, Margaret Dygas, Monika Kruse, Nick Curly, Nina Kraviz b2b Helena Hauff, Pan-Pot, Peggy Gou, Recondite, Ricardo Villalobos b2b Craig Richards, Ricardo Villalobos, Richie Hawtin, Seebase, Seth Troxler, Solomun b2b Tale Of Us b2b Dixon, Solomun, Steffen Baumann, Sven Väth, Tale Of Us, The Martinez Brothers, tINI
28-29 October 2022	Mannheim	Adam Beyer, Amelie Lens, Dax J, Denis Sulta, Enrico Sangiuliano, Héctor Oaks, Joseph Capriati, KAS:ST, Kobosil, Kölsch, Loco Dice, Maceo Plex, MARRØN, PAN-POT, Paula Temple, Peggy Gou, Perel, Reinier Zonneveld Live, Richie Hawtin, Sama' Abdulhadi, Solomun, Sven Väth, VTSS
1 April 2023	Mannheim	Adam Beyer, Adriatique, Amelie Lens, Andrea Oliva, Ann Clue, Boris Brejcha, Charlotte de Witte, Dax J, Dixon, DJ Koze, Gerd Janson, I Hate Models, Jamie Jones, Joseph Capriati, Karotte, Karotte b2b Kölsch, KiNK Live, Klangkuenstler, Kobosil, Kölsch, Loco Dice, Luigi Madonna, Maceo Plex, Marco Carola, Mathew Jonson Live, Nina Kraviz, PAN-POT, Paula Temple, Reinier Zonneveld Live, Reznik, Ricardo Villalobos, Richie Hawtin, Rødhåd, Seebase, Seth Troxler, Sonja Moonear, Steffen Baumann, Sven Väth, The Blessed Madonna, The Martinez Brothers
5-6 April 2024	Mannheim	8Kays, 999999999, Âme live, Anetha, Anfisa Letyago b2b Héctor Oaks, ARTBAT, Ben Klock b2b Adiel, Chris Liebing b2b Speedy J, David Löhlein, Dax J b2b SPFDJ, Fadi Mohem, I Hate Models, KAS:ST, Kevin de Vries, Kobosil, Lee Ann Roberts, NTO Live, Paula Temple, Rødhåd, Adam Beyer, Adriatique, ANNA b2b Sama' Abdulhadi, Boston 168 Live, Chloé Caillet, Chloé Caillet b2b Desiree, Clara Cuvé, DJ Gigola, DJ Holographic, Enrico Sangiuliano, FJAAK, Gerd Janson, Honey Dijon, Indira Paganotto, Jamie Jones b2b Stevie Martinez, Jayda G, Jimi Jules, Joseph Capriati, Juliet Fox, Karotte, Kevin Saunderson presents E-Dancer, Laurent Garnier, Loco Dice, Marco Carola, Marco Carola b2b Jamie Jones b2b Seth Troxler b2b Stevie Martinez, Mochakk, Nina Kraviz, Octave One Live, Ogazón, PAN-POT, Patrick Mason, Reinier Zonneveld Live, Ricardo Villalobos, Richie Hawtin, Sam Paganini, Sara Landry, Seebase, Seth Troxler, Seth Troxler b2b GOLFOS (Dennis Cruz b2b Pawsa), Silvie Loto, Solomun b2b Marcel Dettmann, Sven Väth, Überkikz
5 April 2025	Mannheim	Acid Pauli, Adam Beyer, Adam Ten, Adiel b2b Quest, Airrica, Amelie Lens, Anfisa Letyago, Ben Klock, Black Coffee, CamelPhat, Carlita, Charlotte de Witte, Clara Cuvé, Daria Kolosova b2b Héctor Oaks, David Löhlein, Dixon b2b Chloé Caillet, DJ Heartstring, Enrico Sangiuliano, Franky Rizardo, HAAi, Indira Paganotto, Jamie Jones, Joseph Capriati, KI/KI, Loco Dice, MALUGI, Marco Carola, Mischluft b2b Pegassi, Nina Kraviz, PAN-POT, Patrick Mason, Richie Hawtin, Sedef Adasï, Seebase, Seth Troxler b2b Mau P, Sven Väth, SYREETA

== See also ==
- List of electronic music festivals
