= Pfanni =

German food company

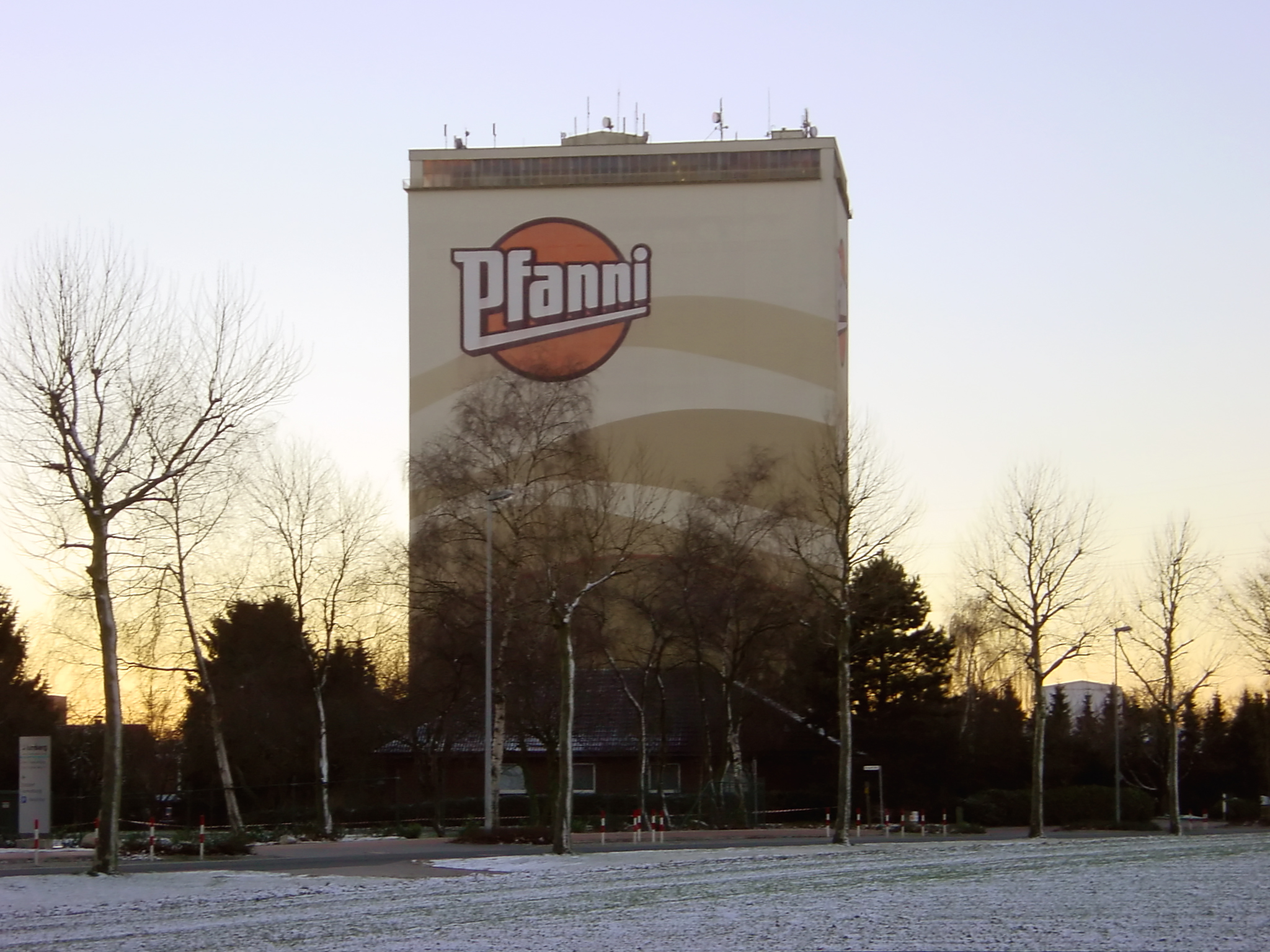
Pfanni Tower in Cloppenburg (2002)

The Pfanni GmbH & Co. OHG is a German food manufacturer based in Stavenhagen. It specializes in the manufacturing of kitchen ready potato products. It is a subsidiary of Unilever since 2000.

== History ==
The company was founded on September 2, 1949 by Werner Eckart in Munich. Whose father, John Eckart, had been producing preserves since 1868.

In the year 1964, Pfanni had a turnover of more that DM50 million, which by 1965 increased to DM80 million. Pfanni employed by that time 1,300 workers and processed 150,000 tonnes of potatoes each year.

Pfanni was sold in 1993 to CPC Germany, later renamed Bestfoods Corporation. Knorr also belongs to Bestfoods Corporation. In 2000, this group of companies was taken over by Unilever, which offers Pfanni branded potato products such as raspeball, dumpling dough, mashed potato, TV dinner and gnocchi. The dumpling varieties also includes bread dumplings.

After the company had moved to Mecklenburg-Vorpommern, in 1996 the huge former factory site of the Pfanni company that was located in Munich’s Berg am Laim district became a nightlife and party district called Kunstpark Ost, hosting more than 30 discotheques and spawning several internationally renowned nightclubs such as Ultraschall, KW – Das Heizkraftwerk and Natraj Temple. From 2003 to 2016, the party area was managed by new operators under the name Kultfabrik. In the same year the Potato Museum opened up on the former factory grounds. The museum is financed by the Otto Eckart Foundation. Honorary Consul Otto Eckart, the son of the founder, was CEO and owner until the sale of CPC. He is now the executive director of the foundation that bears his name.

The current corporate headquarters from Pfanni is Stravenhagen. An additional factory is located in Cloppenburg (Lower Saxony). The plant in Cloppenburg was acquired from the Wersing food company and its production moved to Addrup.

In the Cloppenburg district of Emstekerfeld, a 76-meter tower stands in memory of Pfanni. The tower was built in 1963 and is a part of the then newly built factory of Spreda Nahrungsmittelwerke AG. Spreda AG stopped production in 1965. Later Pfanni took over the premises; the "Spreda Spray Tower" built for the drying process, was renamed the "Pfanni Tower" and was made a symbol of the city.

== Literature ==
Eckart, Otto (2012). Pfanni – Mein Leben (in German). Munich: August Dreesbach Verlag. ISBN 978-3-940061-82-9.
