= Female:pressure =

Network of musicians

female:pressure is an international network of female, transgender and non-binary artists in the fields of electronic music and digital arts founded by Electric Indigo.

It was founded as an information resource and network for improving communication and representation of its members. It is notable for raising the profile of women and their work, including through festivals and media campaigns.

Since 2013, the Facts Survey has been published every two years; it is a data collection effort that tracks the gender breakdown of performers at major electronic music festivals and within the electronic music scene. This network has given rise to joint initiatives, such as the Perspectives Festival, aimed at “drawing attention to the ongoing underrepresentation of female musicians in club culture.

== Link ==
Website
