= Susanne Kirchmayr =

Austrian music producer, DJ and feminist (born 1965)

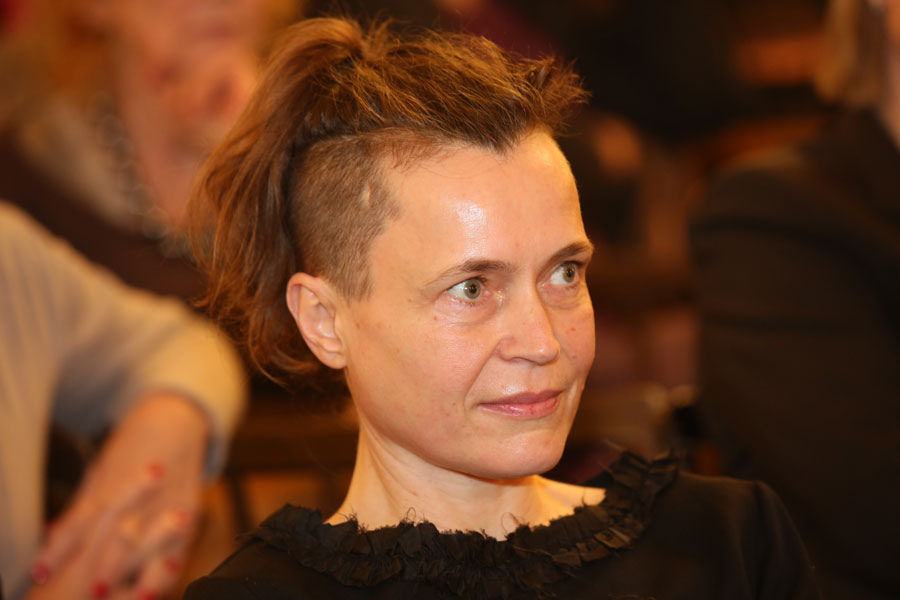
Kirchmayr in 2015

Susanne Kirchmayr a.k.a. Electric Indigo (born 15 December 1965) is an Austrian music producer, Techno DJ and feminist who performs under the name Electric Indigo. Her stage name is a combined reference to her favorite color indigo and her affinity for electronic music.

She began her music career in 1989 in Vienna as a Jazz - and radio -DJ. Shortly thereafter, she shifted her style to focus on Detroit Techno and Chicago House. From 1993 to 1996, she lived in Berlin and was signed to the legendary record label Hard Wax. In 1998, Kirchmayr launched female:pressure an international platform for female DJs, producers and artists involved in electronic music. female:pressure is a web-based database for female talent and was created to promote mutual support and communication, and to provide a source of information about artists.

In 2002 she was invited to play the main stage at the Detroit Electronic Music Festival. In 2003, Kirchmayr founded her own label, Electric Indigo, indigo: inc recordings. In 2004 she started a collaboration with Mia Zabelka and Dorit Chrysler entitled colophony circuit .

In 2012, Kirchmayr was awarded the Outstanding Artist Award for Music of the Federal Ministry for Education and Women, Arts and Culture Award (Austria).

== Discography ==
- Electric Indigo: 5 1 1 5 9 3 (imbalance computer music) Mar. 2018
- Electric Indigo & Dorit Chrysler: Sheets (Chicks On Speed Records / Girl Monster compilation) Aug. 2006
- Exile remixed system - Electro Indigo: The Sons And The Beast (Pripuzzi 001) Nov. 2005
- Toktok - Dende ligand / Electro Indigo & Skin Man Remix (v-records) in September 2005
- Markus Güntner feat. Rich - Everybody / Electro Indigo Remix (Spring) May 2005
- Electro Indigo - Six-Trak Reworks 2 (indigo: inc) Dec. 2004
- T21 - Personal Feelings / Electro Indigo Remix (Le Maquis) Nov. 2004
- Electro Indigo - Six-Trak Reworks 1 (indigo: inc) Nov. 2004
- SPG - Yes We Are / Electro Indigo Remix Soundlab Entertainment Oct. 2004
- Gwenn Labarta - Vortexx voice track / Electro Indigo Remix (UMR 025) in September 2004
- Microthol - Sexy Lady / Electro Indigo Remix (indigo: inc) 2004
- Reinhard Voigt - How We Rock / Electro Indigo Remix ( Kompakt 91) 2003
- Electro Indigo - Six-Trak EP 2 (indigo: inc) 2003
- Electro Indigo - Six-Trak EP 1 (indigo: inc) 2003
- Electro Indigo / Acid Maria - World Tour Mix CD (True People) in 2003, feat. her tracks Beautiful Angelica, The Puzzle
- Electro Indigo - theme mix CD (theme) in 2002, feat. Indigo's Dirty Floor
- Electro Indigo - Tribute to Gazometer Mix CD (XXX Records) 2001
- Electro Indigo & David Carretta - I Want You (folk dance) 2000
- USA - Electro Indigo Mix CD (Petra) 2000
- Electro Indigo & David Carretta - Comin 'at You (Pornflake) 2000
- Electro Indigo & David Carretta - Machine ( International Deejay Gigolos ) 2000
- Electro Indigo - Hitchhiker (Mueller) 1999
- DJ Rush - Oh La La / Electro Indigo Mix (Mental Groove) 1996
- Electro Indigo Mix Tape (International Deejay Gigolos) 1996
- Loisaida Sisters - Home Cooking ep (Pharma) 1996
- Electro Indigo & Walker - Golden Gate Bridge (Temple) 1995
- Electro Indigo & Walker - SP 12 Trax (Djungle Fever) 1994
- Northstar - Figure Skating ep ( Disk B ) 1994
- DJ Hell - My Definition of House / North Star RMX, released on the album Tarred & feathered (Disk B) 1994
- North Star - Electro Silence / Energy 93 Compilation (Disk B) 1993
- Electro Indigo & Richard Bartz - Skyscraper (Disk B) 1993
- Electro Indigo - Skyway (Experimental, NY) 1993

== See also ==
- List of female electronic musicians
