= Berghain =

Nightclub in Berlin

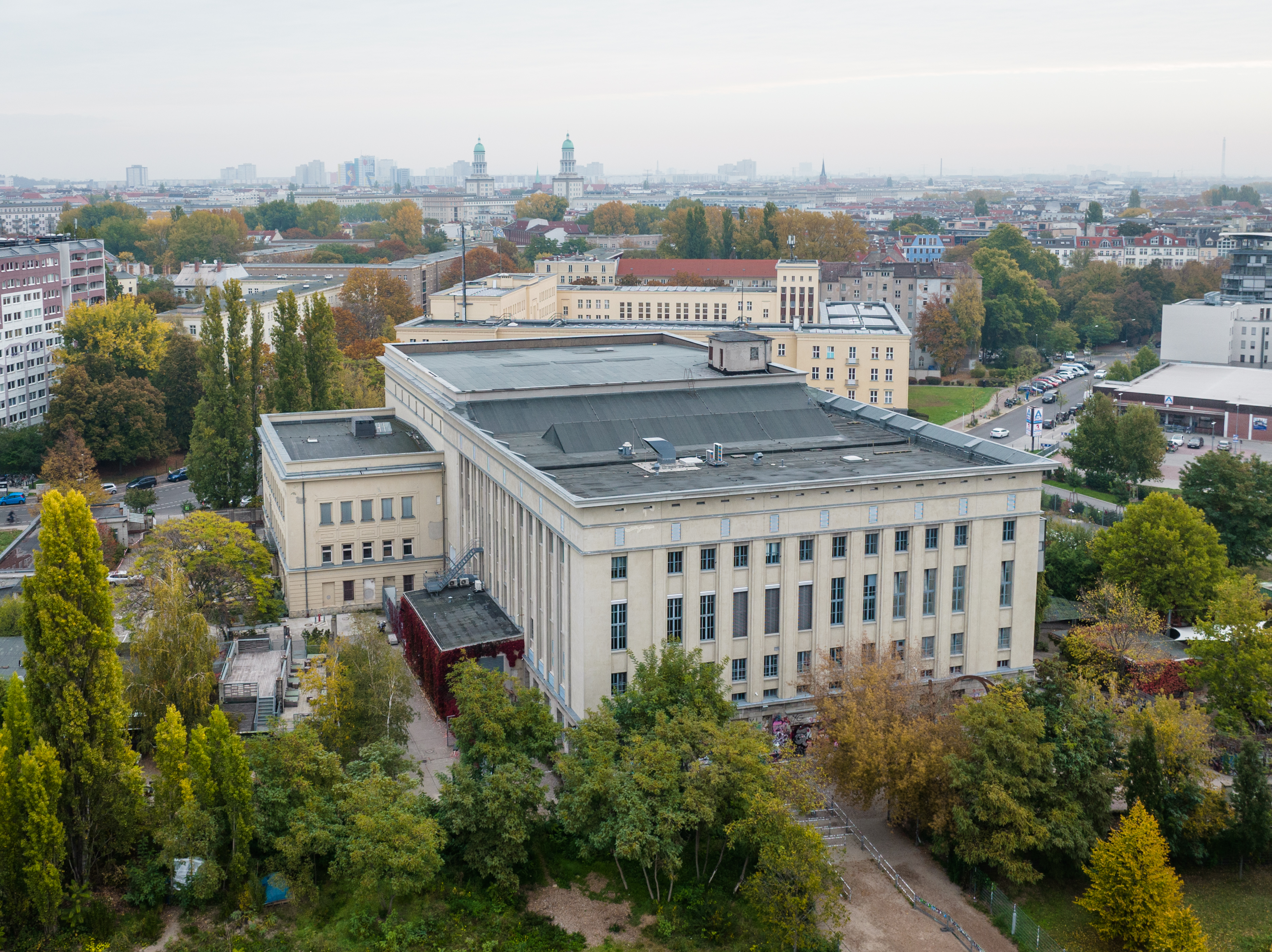
- The Berghain nightclub building (2022)

- Location within Berlin
- Address: Am Wriezener Bahnhof
- Location: Friedrichshain, Berlin, Germany
- Coordinates: 52°30′40″N 13°26′35″E
- Capacity: 1,500
- Type: Nightclub
- Designation: Cultural institution

Construction
- Opened: 2004; 22 years ago

Berghain (German: [ˈbɛʁkhaɪn]) is a nightclub in Berlin, Germany. It is named after its location near the border between Kreuzberg and Friedrichshain and is a short walk from Berlin Ostbahnhof main line railway station. Founded in 2004 by friends Norbert Thormann and Michael Teufele, it has since become one of the world's most famous clubs and has been called the world capital of techno.

Berghain traces its roots to 1990s Berlin, beginning with hardcore techno and fetish parties in the Reichsbahnbunker, evolving into the influential gay club Ostgut in 1998. After Ostgut’s closure in 2003, its founders opened Berghain in 2004 in a former power plant, merging techno music with sexual freedom. It features a techno-focused main room, the house music-oriented Panorama Bar, and a seasonal outdoor garden. Its sound systems are considered state-of-the-art. It was temporarily transformed into an art space during the COVID-19 pandemic before resuming club events in 2021. Lab.oratory is a male-only sex club located behind Berghain, described by Rolling Stone as Berlin’s most extreme.

Berghain is known for its extended weekend hours, strict and selective door policy, diverse queer culture, dedicated spaces for sexual activity, and an environment that has been described as influencing fluidity in sexual orientation and behavior. It has been embroiled in controversy over drug-related incidents, including overdoses and safety concerns, as well as political criticism linked to its drug culture and atmosphere.

Berghain’s owners launched the Ostgut Ton record label in 2005, focusing on techno genres and releases from resident DJs, followed by the Ostgut Booking agency around 2007, both of which became influential in the dance music scene before closing in 2021 and 2022 respectively. Berghain has consistently ranked among the world’s top clubs in DJ Magazine’s Top 100 since 2008—reaching #1 in 2009—and has been repeatedly nominated as Best Global Club by the International Dance Music Awards. It is frequently referenced in music, television, film, and popular media.

== History ==
Berghain's origins go back to the mid-1990s. Beginning in 1992, Reichsbahnbunker Friedrichstraße was used for hardcore techno parties. Thormann and Teufele hosted a male-only fetish club night called Snax. Snax Club launched in 1994 with men-only events called Pervy Party. One of the locations of Snax Club was Reichsbahnbunker in Mitte. In 1995, Snax Club also came to Vrieshuis Amerika in Amsterdam.

After parties in Bunker ended in December 1996, Snax Club found a steady location of its own, which opened in 1998 and was called Lab.oratory. Thormann and Teufele were offered a depot building to rent next to the Lab.oratory. This venue occupying a former railway repair depot in Friedrichshain became Ostgut. Lab.oratory hosted regular gay events, but "on certain nights of the month" Ostgut and Lab.oratory were combined into one space for Snax. Unless a Snax event took place, Ostgut was open to the general public.

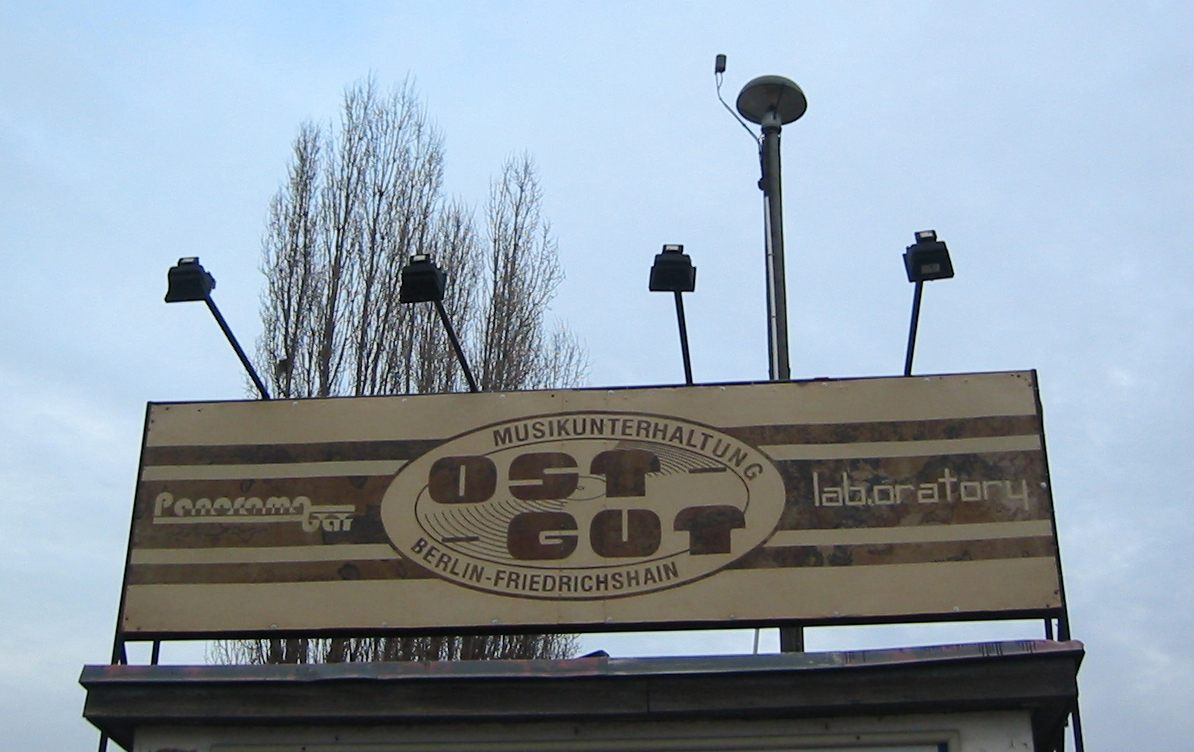
The sign for Ostgut (2006)

Despite being inclusive to all genders, Ostgut remained predominantly gay. It was a unique intersection between techno music and gay sex: "The main bar was located behind the dance floor – as well as the darkrooms, more or less to the irritation of the party people from Mitte. In Mitte’s techno clubs, gay lifestyle played only a marginal role. And vice versa: Most gay clubs didn’t care much about modern club music." Two years after the Ostgut launch, the same team opened another space in the same building, this was named Panorama Bar. All three spaces together had the address Mühlenstraße 26–30.

According to Deutsche Welle, Ostgut, "known for unique parties and boundless freedoms, sexual and otherwise, is considered to have paved the way for Berghain". "It remains Teufele’s and Thormann’s ultimate secret how they persuaded (or seduced) the gay crowd to dance to modern club music." Ostgut closed in January 2003, with the building slated for demolition and later replaced by a large indoor arena, the O_{2} World Berlin.

Berghain opened in 2004 as a reincarnation of Ostgut. Panorama Bar opened in October 2004, the main space Berghain in December of the same year. A new Lab.oratory opened in 2005. The name "Berghain" is a portmanteau of the two city quarters that flank the south and north sides of the building, Kreuzberg (formerly in West Berlin) and Friedrichshain (formerly in East Berlin), and has been described as evocative of the club's "post-1989 identity". The literal meaning of the German word Berghain is "mountain grove".

The club is located in the former Friedrichshain Combined Heat and Power Plant built in 1953 as part of the flagship post-war Stalinallee development and abandoned in the 1980s. The space was originally rented from the energy company Vattenfall but has been owned outright by the club since 2011. The building has a cavernous main room with 18-meter ceilings and is dominated by steel and concrete. The design of the club's interior, as well as later interior and exterior expansions of the venue, were carried out by the Berlin design firm Studio Karhard.

In 2016, a German court officially designated Berghain a cultural institution, which allows the club to pay a reduced tax rate.

== Nightclub ==
The club's main room is focused on techno, with a smaller upstairs space, Panorama Bar, featuring house music. In a different area on an upper floor, there is an ice cream parlour which also sells smoothies. An outdoor garden opens between late spring and early autumn to host daytime DJ sets.

Berghain has a Funktion-One sound system on its main dance floor. Its first iteration, called the Dance Stack, was installed in 2005 and was one of the company's largest club installs. The Dance Stack was replaced with a new, updated Funktion-One system in 2023. The Panorama Bar system was upgraded in 2017 with a four-point line-array system with an additional six subwoofers from Studt Akustik.

At the onset of the COVID-19 pandemic in Germany, in March 2020, Berghain closed, along with all other nightclubs in Berlin. Over the summer, it hosted several sound art installations inside the building and garden. In September 2020, the indoors club reopened as an art space, hosting an exhibition titled "Studio Berlin" featuring 115 Berlin-based artists including Tacita Dean, Olafur Eliasson and Wolfgang Tillmans. In October 2021, 19 months after shuttering, Berghain resumed indoor dance club events. Patrons are required either to be vaccinated against or to have recovered from COVID-19.

== Lab.oratory ==
The basement holds a male-only establishment called "Lab.oratory", which Rolling Stone described in 2014 as being "known as Berlin’s most extreme sex club." For Snax parties, Lab.oratory and Berghain are combined into a single venue. This is in tradition with the old Snax at Ostgut in Mühlenstraße, but takes place less frequently.

== Culture ==
Berghain has become associated with decadence and hedonism. It is open continuously most weekends from Saturday night through late Monday morning. The club offers dark rooms dedicated to sexual activity, and media have frequently reported on guests openly indulging in sexual acts. In 2019 Frieze magazine observed that in Berghain's early years, "the main room was mostly a space for gay men, [...] and now its queer palette is more mixed [however] the club’s values remain the same: concealment, queerness and excess". The twice-yearly Snax Party is reserved for gay men only.

No photos are allowed to be taken inside the club, and patrons are required to cover their smartphone cameras with a sticker. This policy was also maintained in 2020 when the club temporarily converted into an art space for the "Studio Berlin" exhibition during the COVID-19 pandemic. Additionally, the toilets of the club have no mirrors, purportedly so the club's guests are spared the "buzzkilling indignity of seeing their own faces after an epic partying session".

A 2022 academic study described Berghain as a unique "pharmacolibidinal constellation", where existing sexual orientations may become porous, as well as preexisting behaviors altered, due to the environment.

The club's door policy is notorious for being both strict and opaque, generating frequent debate and speculation. The club's bouncers have also been accused of racism. The head bouncer Sven Marquardt, who is a photographer, is also a minor celebrity in the techno scene.

== Controversies and criticism ==
Berghain has, at times, been the focal point of controversy surrounding drug use in the club and consequential health emergencies.

A 30-year-old American woman died in June 2017, shortly after she left Berghain, having taken ecstasy that she had supposedly purchased inside the club. While visiting Berlin, she, her husband, and their Dutch friend decided to visit the club late one night. She had her own MDMA pill taken by security, according to Der Spiegel, and therefore bought two additional pills in the restroom of the club. After the effects of the pills started, where the woman showed signs of medical distress—by foaming from the mouth and losing consciousness—another person in the club, along with the club staff, allegedly delayed calling medical services, under the impression that the effects would wear off. After another fifteen minutes or so, an ambulance was called, and she was rushed to the hospital; however, she died shortly after arrival.

A toxicology report revealed that the MDMA dosage she consumed was substantially greater than what is considered a standard recreational amount. This incident prompted extensive discussions within German media regarding the safety protocols associated with drug use in Berlin's nightlife, encompassing appeals for the implementation of on-site drug-checking services and enhanced emergency procedures.

In 2019, there were unconfirmed reports of three individuals dying in a single night at Berghain after consuming pills that were marketed as ecstasy. Moreover, in 2022, incidents of needle spiking were encountered by clubbers at Berghain, where individuals were injected with unidentified drugs without their consent. Although these incidents have not been formally verified, they have helped fuel ongoing discussions regarding drug safety in nightclub settings. In spite of pressure from publicly documented cases of overdose, clubs such as Berghain have resisted introducing harm-reduction policies, including drug-checking, on the grounds of legal ambiguity and in order to maintain their low-interventionist policy. This has generated controversy among public health proponents, some of whom maintain that preventive measures could be taken to minimize health risks without undermining the cultural identity of the club. The German courts' official acknowledgment of the club as a cultural institution has raised additional concerns about state accountability and responsibility for public health and safety.

Alongside drug scandals, Berghain has also had political scandals. In 2018, AfD politician Sibylle Schmidt called for the closure of the club in a motion. Her justification followed the AfD's overall far-right-leaning rhetoric, citing the drug use and oversexualized atmosphere.

== Record label and booking agency ==
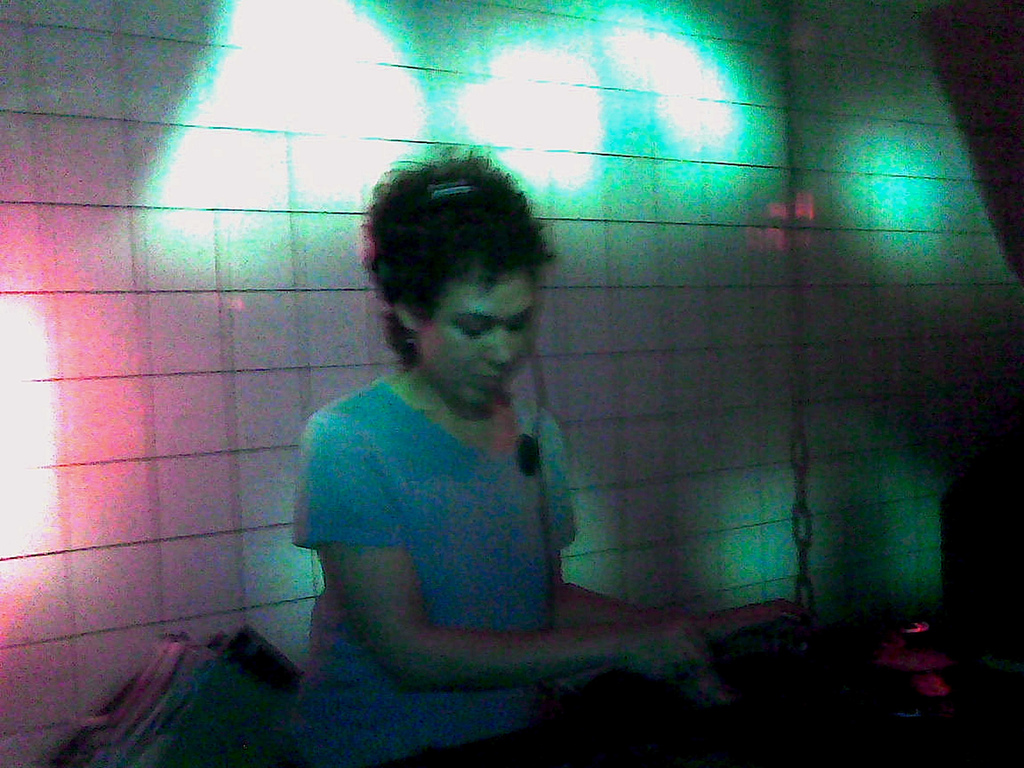
Panorama Bar resident Cassy

In 2005, Berghain's owners started a record label, Ostgut Ton, conceived by former Ostgut resident DJ Nick Höppner after Ostgut's closure in 2003. Its first releases were by Berghain/Panorama Bar DJ residents such as Marcel Dettmann, Cassy and Ben Klock. The label's music is mostly techno, tech house, Detroit techno and minimal techno.

In 2007, Berghain collaborated with the Berlin State Ballet to create Shut Up and Dance! Updated, a ballet for five dancers that was performed at the club in late June and early July that year. The ballet's soundtrack, released on Ostgut Ton on May 29, 2007, is made up of five specially composed tracks by prominent minimal techno artists, such as Luciano, Âme, Sleeparchive and Luke Slater (The 7th Plain). The soundtrack received some positive reviews, while the ballet was less well received.

In October 2010, the label released a five-year anniversary compilation, Fünf, for which field recordings from within the club were used. Nick Höppner explained that the idea had come from his collaborator Emika on "a regular Sunday morning [at Berghain, where] she noticed how everything in the building was resonating and vibrating and swinging and humming–she realized that there were a lot of sounds coming from the building itself. That led to the idea of doing field recordings within the building while it's not open to the public."

In the same 2010 interview, Höppner stated that Ostgut Ton was turning down many recordings because there are "so many in-house artists", while the label at that time was selling more product than other labels, but not generating much profit.

Ostgut Ton closed in December 2021, having been (according to Resident Advisor) "a dominant force in dance music, beloved for its mix series and dozens of EPs, albums and compilations" for 16 years.

In 2021, ARTE Concerts produced a series of three videos at the Berghain and released it on YouTube.

Around 2007, Berghain also launched its own booking agency, Ostgut Booking, which among other artists represented Ben Klock, Steffi, and Marcel Dettmann. In October 2022, it was announced that Ostgut Booking (which at the time represented 28 acts and had eight employees) would be closing down at the end of the year.

== Recognition ==
=== DJ Magazine's top 100 Clubs ===
Berghain first entered DJ Magazine's Top 100 Clubs list in 2008, ranking 20th, and reached the top position the next year.

==== Position by year ====
Year	Position	Notes	Ref.
2008	20	New Entry	
2009	1	—N/a	
2010	8	—N/a	
2011	6	—N/a	
2012	13	—N/a	
2013	18	—N/a	
2014	14	—N/a	
2015	13	—N/a	
2016	16	—N/a	
2017	12	—N/a	
2018	10	—N/a	
2019	10	—N/a	
2020	8	—N/a	
2021	6	—N/a	
2022	12	—N/a	
2023	16	—N/a	
2024	13	—N/a	
2025	16		

=== International Dance Music Awards ===
Year	Category	Work	Result	Ref.
2010	Best Global Club	Berghain - Berlin, Germany	Nominated	
2012	Best Global Club	Berghain - Berlin, Germany	Nominated	
2013	Best Global Club	Berghain - Berlin, Germany	Nominated	
2014	Best Global Club	Berghain - Berlin, Germany	Nominated	
2015	Best Global Club	Berghain - Berlin, Germany	Nominated	
2016	Best Global Club	Berghain - Berlin, Germany	Nominated	
2020	Best Global Club	Berghain - Berlin, Germany	Nominated	

== In popular culture ==
- In 2013, American pop star Lady Gaga hosted an event at Berghain promoting her techno-inspired album, Artpop
- In 2016, American comedian Conan O'Brien attempted to gain admission to Berghain while filming a travel episode of his television show Conan, but was denied and asked to leave, even after he asked if he could enter without his camera crew.
- In 2017, the card game Bergnein was released, a satirical card game where the goal is to "Let the right people in, outshine your colleagues and win the game!"
- In 2021, DJ Mag suspected that "a number of Berlin clubs have inspired Hitman III's new night time venue: Club Hölle", a virtual in-game nightclub, including "Berghain, Kraftwerk and Griessmüehle".
- The electro song "Ostbahnhof" by the French producers Miss Kittin and The Hacker, released in 2022, describes a night spent at Berghain without naming the club.
- In 2023, the film John Wick: Chapter 4 features John Wick visiting a fictional club in Berlin named "Himmel und Hölle", which also features a cameo appearance by Berghain bouncer Sven Marquardt.
- The song "Berliner Luft" by German band Scooter, released in 2023, mentions Berghain along with other Berlin clubs.

== See also ==
- List of electronic dance music venues
- Superclub
- JakoJako, Berghain resident
- Paramida, resident DJ at Panoramabar
