= Dixon (DJ) =

German musician (born 1975)

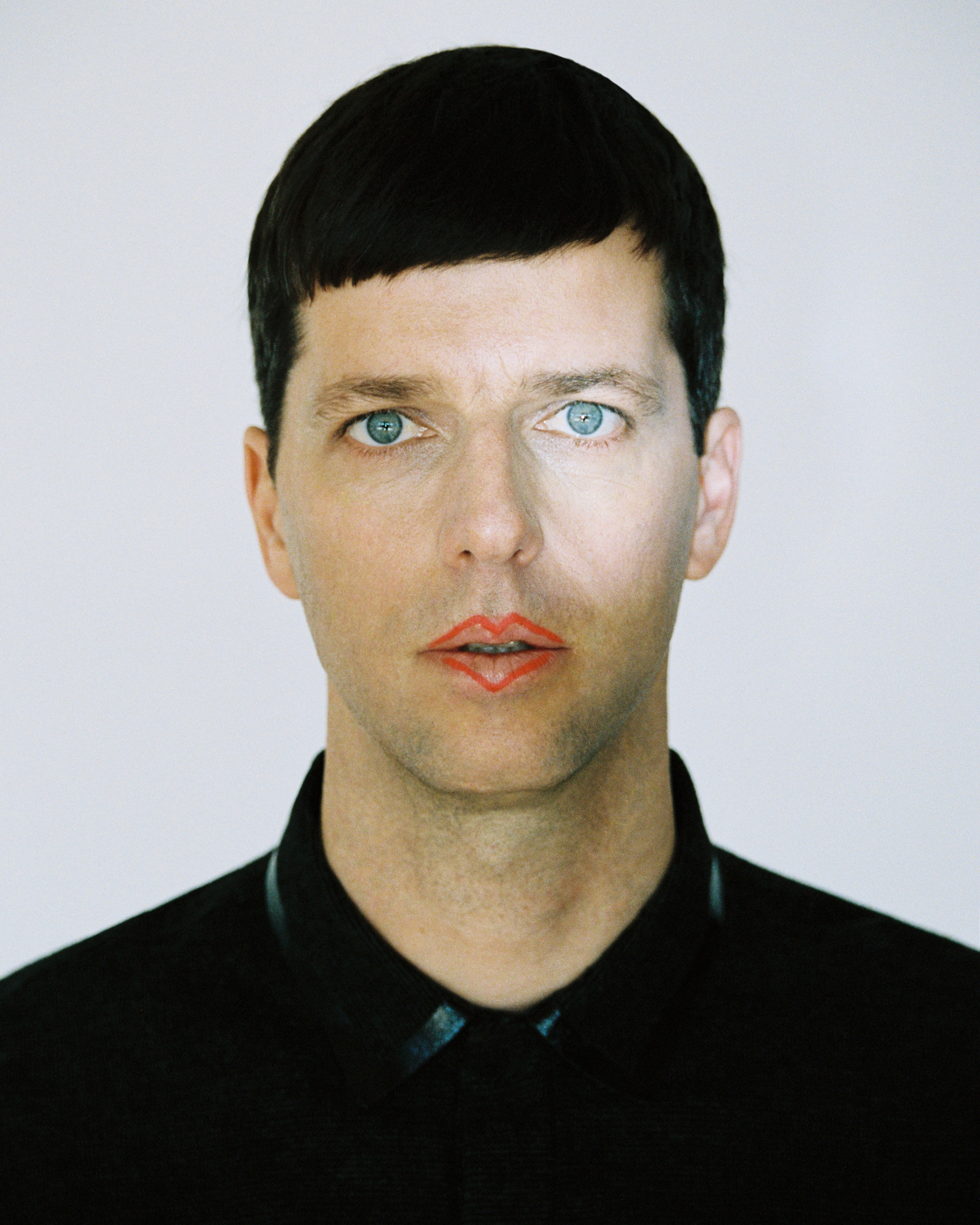

Background information
- Also known as: Dixon
- Born: Steffen Berkhahn; 21 December 1975 (age 50); Anklam, East Germany
- Genres: House, techno
- Occupations: DJ, Producer, Record Label Founder, Fashion Label Founder
- Years active: 1991–present
- Labels: Innervisions, Sonar Kollektiv, Get Physical Music, WMF Records

Dixon (born Steffen Berkhahn; 21 December 1975) is a German musician, best known as a house and techno DJ and producer, as well founder of record label Innervisions, based in Berlin. In recent years, he has also made endeavours into fashion and technology, and is the joint owner of club-wear clothing brand Together We Dance Alone. In 2019 he launched an Ibiza residency and digital platform of the same name, Transmoderna. Dixon was voted as the number one DJ on Resident Advisor's Top 100 DJ Poll every year from 2013 to the last annual poll in 2016.

== Life and work ==
Berkhahn was born in Anklam. He grew up in East Berlin and was aiming for a career as a professional footballer or a long-distance runner, an ambition that was thwarted due to injury.

In the early 1990s he began DJing under the name Dixon in Berlin clubs such as Turbine, Tresor, E-Werk and WMF. For several years he held a weekly residency at WMF with Mitja Prinz, which he describes a key experience in his formative years as a DJ. His residencies at Tresor, WMF and later Weekend Club all involved playing long sets. In a city known in particular for techno music, Dixon established a reputation as a deep house DJ.

Dixon's global prominence as a DJ has grown over the years through appearances at clubs and festivals worldwide. He was voted No. 1 in Resident Advisor's Top 100 DJ Poll in the years 2013, 2014, 2015 and 2016. In terms of style, German newspaper Die Welt credits Dixon with "bringing back vocals, drama and grand emotions to the dancefloor" after the electronic dance music scene was dominated by minimal techno for several years. Die Tageszeitung agrees that Dixon and Innervisions "changed the sound of Berlin."

Dixon first began record label and A&R work at the Sonar-Kollektiv sublabel Recreation Recordings. In 2005 he founded the label Innervisions with Kristian Beyer and Frank Wiedemann from Âme. Initially a sub-label of Sonar Kollektiv, it became independent in 2006. British magazine Mixmag says the label has had "an astounding influence on the global house scene."

As a producer, Dixon has released several EPs in collaboration with artists such as Georg Levin, Derrick Carter, Henrik Schwarz and Âme. Dixon often creates his own edits of other artists' tracks for use in his DJ sets. Some of the most notable of these include his 2017 edit of Depeche Mode's "Cover Me" and 2018 edit of "i used to" by LCD Soundsystem, both released on [Columbia Records].

Berkhahn lives with his wife and son in Berlin.

In 2018, Dixon was added into Grand Theft Auto Online as a nightclub DJ as part of the After Hours DLC.

== Together We Dance Alone ==
In 2017, Dixon branched out from music and started his own fashion label "Together We Dance Alone", along with its current creative director, Ana Ofak. The label released its first limited-edition long sleeve in conjunction with designer Kristina Nagel, before aligning with Japanese fashion brand Sacai to release another long-sleeved style, which was available in Sacai's Tokyo showroom and Together We Dance Alone's webshop.

Since then the brand has teamed up with a number of other designers, and continued to collaborate with Sacai, releasing an additional limited edition printed short sleeve design in December 2019.

Alongside Together We Dance Alone's online store, there are select stores in Los Angeles, Berlin and Paris.

== Transmoderna ==
In the Summer of 2019, Dixon launched the first season of his Ibiza residency, Transmoderna. The initial season was hosted at Pacha and ran every Friday night for 20 weeks, from May to October. Transmoderna evolved into more than just a club night, in parallel acting as a digital platform to explore boundaries between different spheres of music, art, fashion, technology and club culture. With particular focus on crossovers between the real and virtual, Transmoderna reached into elements of AR, launching two of their own Instagram face filters, created by Johanna Jaskowska.

Towards the end of the first season, an official Transmoderna music video was released, representing a culmination of the overlapping elements that came together initially to form the overall Transmoderna concept. Soundtracked by Âme and Mathew Jonson, it brought together visual artists, fashion designers, choreographers, dance performers and programmers, which was then given to an AI to tweak and alter the final product.

Transmoderna has since been confirmed for a second season, with its venue announced to be moving to DC10 in 2020.

== Discography ==
=== Singles and EPs ===
- 2005: Wahoo presented By Dixon and Georg Levin – Holding You (Sonar Kollektiv)
- 2006: Henrik Schwarz / Âme / Dixon feat. Derrick L. Carter – Where We At EP (Sonar Kollektiv, Innervisions)
- 2008: Henrik Schwarz / Âme / Dixon – D.P.O.M.B. EP (Innervisions)
- 2009: Dixon – Temporary Secretary – Dixon Edits (Innervisions)
- 2010: Henrik Schwarz / Âme / Dixon – A Critical Mass Live EP (Innervisions)
- 2014: Guy Gerber & Dixon – No Distance EP (Rumors)

=== Mixes and compilations ===
- 1999: V.A. – Off Limits (Recreation Recordings)
- 2000: V.A. – Off Limits 2 (Recreation Recordings)
- 2001: Dixon and Mitja Prinz – Audio Video Disco (WMF Records)
- 2002: V.A. – Off Limits 3 (Recreation Recordings)
- 2007: DJ Dixon – Body Language Vol. 4 (Get Physical Music)
- 2009: Dixon – Temporary Secretary (Innervisions)
- 2009: Henrik Schwarz / Âme / Dixon – The Grandfather Paradox (BBE)
- 2010: Dixon – Five Years Of Innervisions Compiled & Mixed By Dixon × Air (Lastrum)
- 2011: Dixon – Live At Robert Johnson Volume 8 (Live At Robert Johnson)

=== Remixes (selected) ===
- 2007: Tokyo Black Star - Still Sequence - Innervisions Version - Âme & Dixon (Innervisions (Label))
- 2007: Will Saul - Mbira Wahoo - Dixon Remix
- 2009: Atjazz - Harmony - Dixon's Late Night Mix (Atjazz Record Company)
- 2009: The Machine - Fuse - Dixon Remix (Innervisions (Label))
- 2009: Romanthony - The Wanderer - Dixon Edit (Glasgow Underground)
- 2012: Matthew Dekay, Lee Burridge - Lost In A Moment - Dixon Rework (Innervisions (Label))
- 2013: The XX - Tides - Dixon Remix (Young Turks)
- 2013: Mano Le Tough - Everything You've Done Before - Dixon Remix (Permanent Vacation)
- 2013: Mathew Jonson - Level 7 - Dixon Remix (Crosstown Rebels)
- 2014: Claude VonStroke - Urban Animal - Dixon Dub Mix (Dirtybird)
- 2014: Joy Wellboy - Before The Sunrise - Dixon Remix (Bpitch Control)
- 2015: Plastikman - EXhale - Dixon's Just A Different Mixdown Version (Mute Records)
- 2016: Todd Terje - Snooze 4 Love - Dixon Remix (Olsen Records)
- 2017: Depeche Mode - Cover Me - Dixon Remix (Columbia Records)
- 2017: Chloé - The Dawn - Dixon Remix (Lumière Noire Records)
- 2018: LCD Soundsystem - I Used To - Dixon Retouch (Columbia Records)
- 2018: Radio Slave - Trans - Dixon Retouch (Rekids)
- 2019: Kelsey Lu - Why Knock For You - Dixon Retouch (Columbia Records)
