= Paramida =

German DJ and record label owner

PARAMIDA (stylized in all caps) is a German DJ, music producer, and record label owner with Persian background. Based in Berlin, she is a resident DJ at Berghain's Panoramabar and is a travelling DJ. In 2014, she founded electronic music label, Love on the Rocks. PARAMIDA has released three solo EPs. In 2023, she was named one of BBC's 100 Women.

== Biography ==
PARAMIDA was born and grew up in Germany, where her early love for music was sparked by eclectic mixtapes and a taste for punk and Motown. In her youth, she preferred punk, Motown and alternative music, only appreciating electronic and dance music later. On a trip to Toronto at age 12, she picked up CDs by Laurent Garnier and the First Album, which spurred her interest in the musical genre.

From age 13 to 17, PARAMIDA lived in Tehran, where she attended a German school. There, she would attend illegal underground parties and soon became known for her dancing. After returning permanently to Germany, she lived in Wiesbaden, where she discovered the club scene in Frankfurt. She would travel to visit clubs in both Frankfurt and Berlin where she would spend her days and nights dancing and becoming fascinated by house music.

PARAMIDA moved to Berlin in 2010. In 2023, she was named one of the BBC's 100 Women.

=== DJ career ===
When she first expressed interest in becoming a DJ, she recalls the difficulty in breaking into the scene. "I remember that everyone was laughing at me when I wanted to start DJing… and of course all of them were men." Later she shared,

“You have to work hard as a woman...You have to prove yourself. I’ve been DJing for 15 years. It’s not a short time but sometimes I have male colleagues, who, bless them, they’re talented, but they get opportunities in that first year of touring that I only got after years and years.”

In 2015, PARAMIDA played her first set at Berghain's Panoramabar. In 2020 she became a resident DJ at the club, and also works as a touring DJ.

She has had residencies at various radio stations, including Rinse FM in London and Berlin radio station Refuge Worldwide.

In 2023, PARAMIDA held a residency on BBC Radio 1, and in 2024, she delivered a BBC Essential Mix broadcast for the station.

=== Love on the Rocks ===
In 2014 while working in Berlin's OYE Records, PARAMIDA decided to start her own record label, Love on the Rocks as an experiment to explore different types of musical tastes. The imprint incorporates varied musical styles and tastes, including Italo, disco to neo Goa trance, with each release presenting something different for listeners.

In 2024, the label celebrated its 10th anniversary by releasing the compilation album, "Sky is the Limit". As of 2025, the label has released 30 records.

=== Music producer ===
In 2020, she began to experiment with developing her own music as a producer. In 2021, PARAMIDA released her first solo EP, "Dream Ritual". In 2022, she released her second EP on her Love on the Rocks label, ‘Moonrise VII’.

Her third EP, "Devil’s Destination", was released in 2025 on her Love on the Rocks imprint.
