= Sailor & I =

Swedish singer, producer

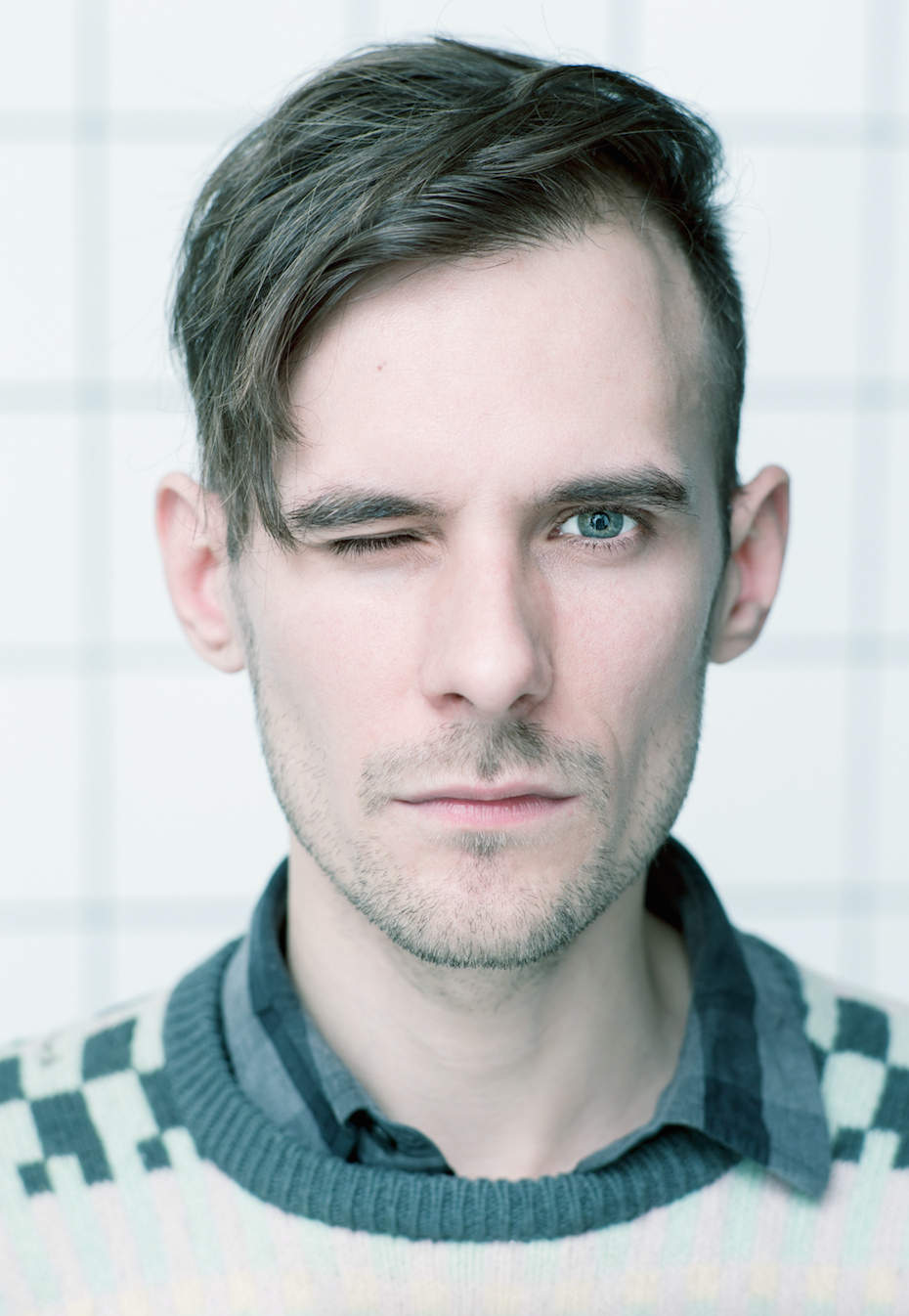
- Sailor & I in 2016

Background information
- Also known as: Sailor & I
- Born: Alexander Sjödin
- Origin: Stockholm, Sweden
- Genres: Indie pop, electronic
- Occupations: Producer, singer, multi-instrumentalist
- Years active: 2012–present
- Labels: BMG UK; Deutsche Grammophon; Life And Death; Atlantic Records/Big Beat; Black Butter Records

Alexander Sjödin, better known under his stage name Sailor & I, is Swedish a singer, producer and multi-instrumentalist.

Sailor & I's work has received critical acclaim from the likes of BBC Radio 1, Resident Advisor, Magnetic Magazine, and KEXP-FM.

His 2012 single Tough Love, released on Black Butter Records has been compared to artists such as Bon Iver, The xx and Active Child. Having played instruments since he was a child, Sailor & I's music has been described as deep and dream-like by MixMag where his debut EP release Tough Love received praise in 2012.

Alongside previous releases on The Invention of Loneliness, Life and Death and Black Butter Records, Sailor & I's songs have also been remixed by Âme, Eric Prydz, Kidnap Kid and Joris Voorn. As well as his work as a vocalist, Sjödin has also collaborated in the studio with electronic artists such as Adriatique and Nic Fanciulli, and is known for his unique voice and emotive style.

Sailor & I's Turn Around remix by AME struck a chord with a large audience, with blogs such as Resident Advisor, The Line of Best Fit and Mixmag rating it as one of their Top 10 tracks of the Summer, alongside the song spending several weeks in the Beatport chart.

In 2015, Sailor & I took his live show on tour, playing festivals such as Open Space Festival in Paris, Electrowerkz in London, Pacha in Dubai, Poplands Festival in Sweden and many more across Europe. As well as drawing influence from elements of Jazz, Rock, Classical and Punk in his music, Sjödin describes his work as a form of escapism from reality, and strives to "fill the void with sounds and have the sounds create emotion in return".

In early 2024, Sailor & I released The Finals, the accompanying soundtrack for the first-person shooter game The Finals. It was composed alongside Embark Studios' audio team and mixed by Tobias Kampe Flygare, to "evoke the big, inviting feeling of classic television game shows".

== Discography ==
Title	Details
Tough Love	Released: 2012; Label: Black Butter Records; Format: Digital
Turn Around	Released: 2014; Label: Life and Death; Format: Digital, vinyl
Leave the Light On	Released: 2015; Label: The Invention of Loneliness; Format: Digital
Sweat EP	Released: 5 May 2015; Label: The Invention of Loneliness, Album; Format: Digital
The Invention of Loneliness	Released: 21 February 2017; Label: BMG UK; Format: Physical, digital
Coming Down	Released: 25 January 2019; Label: SvT; Format: Digital
Rainmaking	Released: 4 February 2019; Label: Beating Heart Records; Format: Digital
Komorebi	Released: 22 March 2019; Label: Deutsche Grammophon; Format: Digital
The Longest Goodbye	Released: 27 September 2019; Label: Metaphysical; Format: Digital
Best of Me (w Artbat)	Released: 11 September 2020; Label: Metaphysical; Format: Digital
Thinking About You	Released: 23 October 2020; Label: Metaphysical; Format: Digital
Clues	Released: 20 November 2020; Label: Metaphysical; Format: Digital
Sleep feat Luca Vasta	Released: 15 January 2021; Label: Metaphysical; Format: Digital
Call To Arms	Released: 12 February 2021; Label: Metaphysical; Format: Digital
The Life That Kills You feat Rude Hagelstein	Released: 28 May 2021; Label: Metaphysical; Format: Digital
Diving For Lost Treasure	Released: July 2021; Label: Metaphysical; Format: Digital
Tough Love (Wize Remix)	Released: 3 December 2021; Label: Arvet; Format: Digital
