= Friedrichshain Combined Heat and Power Plant =

Former heat and power generating plant

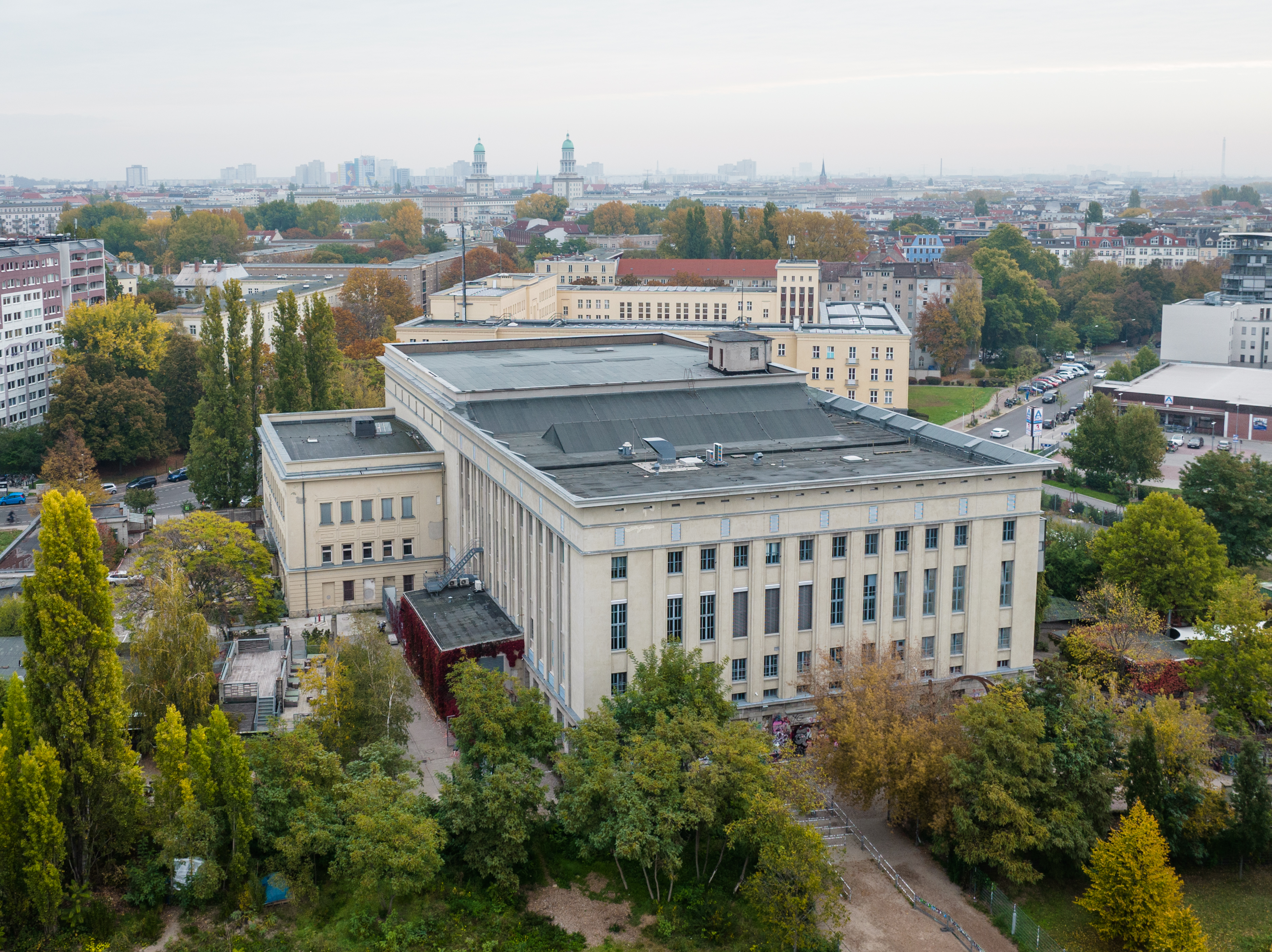
- Former cogeneration plant today without chimneys and cooling tower, in the foreground the turbine and generator house, now Berghain
- Country: Germany
- Location: Berlin
- Coordinates: 52°30′40″N 13°26′35″E
- Status: Adaptive reuse as nightclub
- Commission date: 1953 (heat), 1955 (electricity)
- Decommission date: 1988
- Owners: 1952–1978: Bewag (East); 1978–1990: VEB Energieversorgung Berlin; 1990–1994: Energieversorgung Berlin AG (EBAG); 1994–2001: Bewag; 2001–2002: HEW; 2002–2011: Vattenfall since 2011: Berghain OstGut GmbH

Thermal power station
- Primary fuel: Coal

Power generation
- Nameplate capacity: 11.2 MW

External links
- Commons: Related media on Commons

The Friedrichshain combined heat and power plant is located at Rüdersdorfer Straße in the district Berlin-Friedrichshain. Today the building is widely known as the location of the techno club Berghain. The conversion from cogeneration plant to nightclub took place in 2003/04 and was supervised by the design firm Studio Karhard – led by architects Alexandra Erhard and Thomas Karsten.

== Urban context ==
The planning and construction of the thermal power station are part of Berlin's reconstruction after World War II. One of the major GDR prestige projects in the 1950s was the construction of an exemplary public housing estate in Berlin-Friedrichshain. This project included buildings on Stalinallee (now Karl-Marx-Allee), the Weberwiese high-rise building, the Deutsche Sporthalle arena, a school on Rüdersdorfer Straße (now Ellen-Key-School), a police and fire station, and a combined heat and power station. Architect Thomas Karsten: "It was the heating plant that initially supplied the buildings with heat and later with electricity."

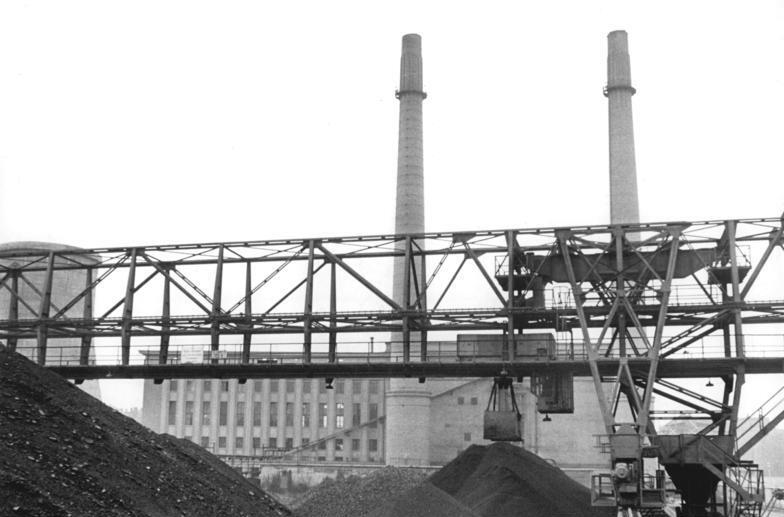
Coal loading bridge and chimneys at the time of the power generation; on the left of the picture the cooling tower can be seen through the steel lattice of the coal loading bridge

The district heating network in East Berlin was not sufficiently developed to supply the large residential area. For this reason, a new district heating plant was specially built in Friedrichshain. From the outset, it was planned to first implement the heating function in 1952, and then to add electricity generation in a second step in 1954. "The heating plant was built with the apartment block development in the style of Socialist Classicism along Karl-Marx-Allee, which was still called Stalinallee at the time of construction. Not only electricity, but above all heat was needed for the modern heating of the new residential and representative buildings."

The original site of the plant stretched from the power plant building eastwards towards Helsingforser Straße and Marchlewskistraße. This was where the coal loading bridge and coal stockpiles were located, among other things. A remaining structure on the former power station's plot is the former locomotive shed, which is now used by the neighbourhood organisation Nirgendwo. Other buildings on the site include the low-rise buildings on the western edge of the property. At the northern corner of the property there is a row with no public use. At the western corner of the property is the so-called canteen (Kantine am Berghain), which is used for live concerts and parties. The area between the canteen and the main building is now used as beer gaden under the name Bierhof Rüdersdorf. The concrete structure, which is now used for the bar and terrace of the beer garden, originally housed a district heating transfer station.

== Construction phases ==
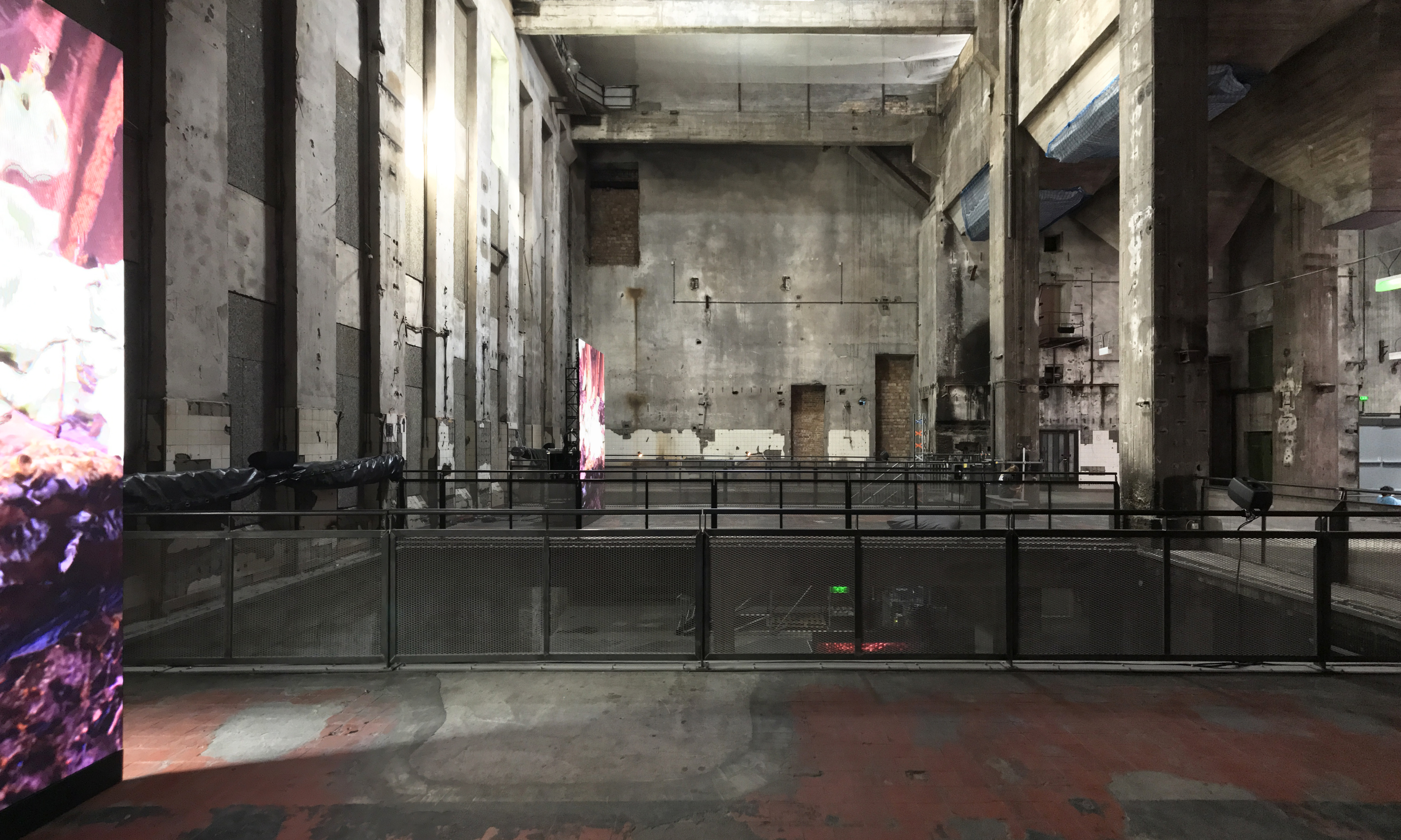
Structural concrete inside the former boiler house, now Halle am Berghain

The official construction period is 1952–1955. "Built in two phases, the building was made out of two ‘cubes’ of 40 x 40 metres." First, a boiler house was completed, which served as a district heating plant. Then, directly after that, the turbine and generator house was built, which then served as the electricity supply. The first construction phase also included two – now demolished – chimneys that connected to the east side of the boiler house. Immediately after the completion of the boiler house, construction began on the turbine and generator house. In 1955, this addition was complete and a cooling tower in the shape of a circular hyperboloid was erected.

The first construction phase was the boiler house. The boiler house is now used for art exhibitions as a Halle am Berghain. The southern half of the boiler house ground floor is occupied by the queer sex club Lab.oratory. The second building phase included the turbine and generator house. The turbine and generator house is now occupied by Berghain and Panorama Bar as well as the club Säule. The Berghain dance floor is the former turbine hall. Panorama Bar is located in the former control room. Thomas Karsten: "It was clear from the start where the 'Panorama Bar' should be: the power plant's former control room with its large windows." The club Säule is located in the northern part of the turbine and generator house ground floor, between the Berghain cloakroom area and Lab.oratory.

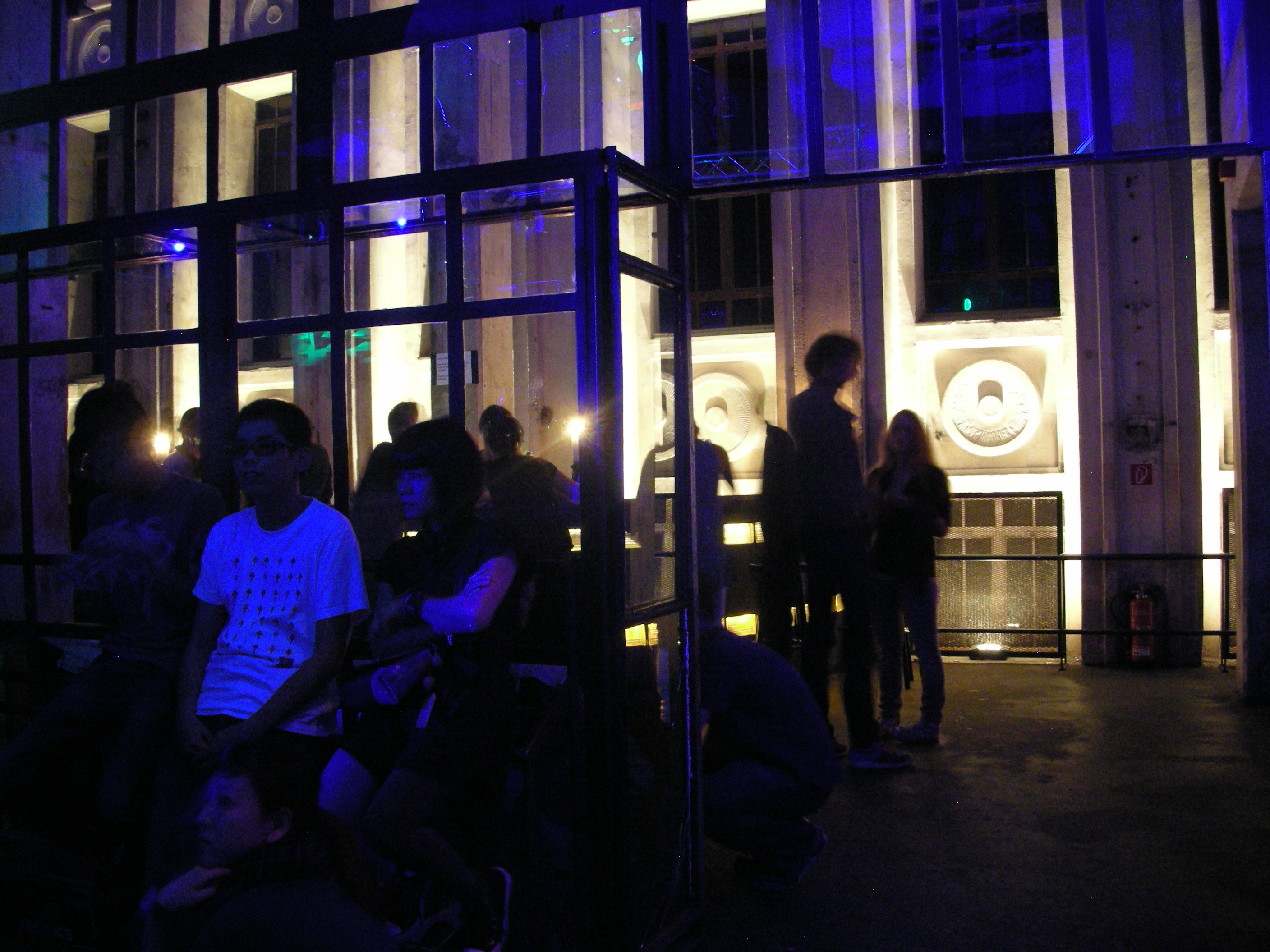
Exterior façade of the boiler house as interior wall in the turbine and generator house, Berghain bar area

Although it was already clear during the planning of the first construction phase in 1952 that the south façade of the boiler house would soon be an interior wall – surrounded by the turbine and generator house – the boiler house south façade was built with the same elaborate architectural design as its north side on Rüdersdorfer Straße. The former outer wall of the first construction phase's boiler house now faces the Berghain bar area. Thomas Karsten: "The plant was gradually expanded. So today we have a former external façade in the interior." Since the Lab.oratory also takes up a small part of the turbine and generator house ground floor, the boiler house outer façade also forms an inner wall here.

The coal bunkers of the power plant are still visible in the first construction phase's boiler house. These large concrete funnels are suspended from the main load-bearing structure. Although the plant became a cogeneration plant when the second building phase's electrical equipment was put into operation – and was no longer a pure heating plant – electricity generation always remained secondary. The main purpose of the plant was to generate heat.

== Architectural style ==
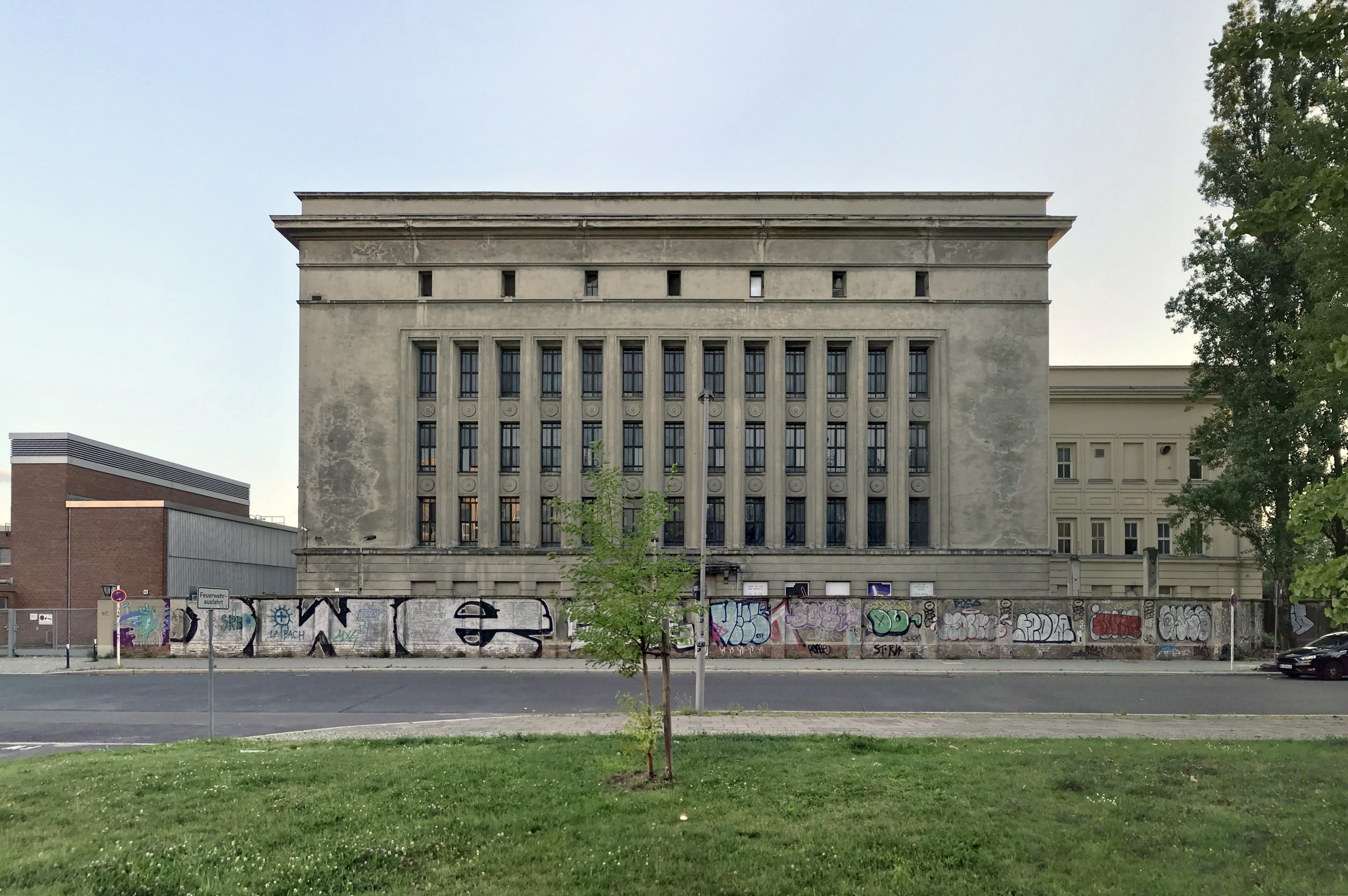
North side of the former boiler house

The most striking design feature of the boiler house and turbine and generator house is the elaborate historicizing architecture in the style of Socialist Classicism. "The combined heat and power plant in Berlin-Friedrichshain, built in a style unusual for power plant buildings, is a classic example of the technical buildings designed in the Stalin era at the beginning of the 1950s." Although the boiler house is a single large hall, from the outside it appears to be four or five storeys high. The large vertical windows seem to be interrupted by parapets. Behind the supposed parapets there are no floor ceilings, but an uninterrupted high space. Both building sections are bracketed by a single very large articulated cornice. The facades are structured with pilasters. "Small mezzanine windows, kept in a strongly horizontal articulated cornice, gave the building the appearance of a Renaissance monument. The bunker-proportioned facades reflected the ‘new’ aesthetics of socialist realism."

A special feature of the façade design is the machine house's plinth. The height of the plinth conceals the true height of the space behind it. The ground floor ceiling itself is higher than the band rustication indicated by ashlar plaster, which ends with a cornice at the top of the plinth. The first row of small horizontal windows above the plinth's cornice also belongs to the ground floor.

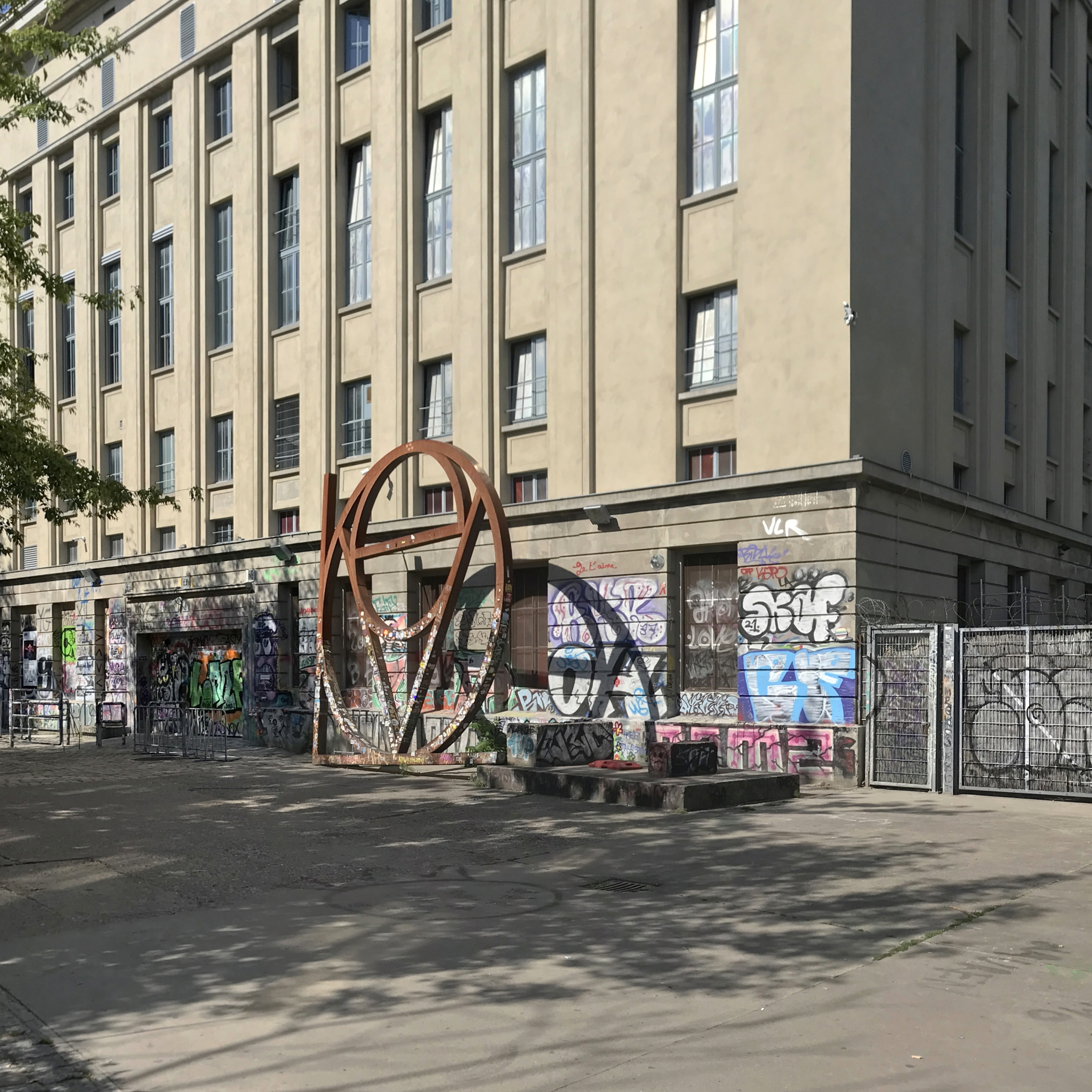
South side of the former turbine and generator house with clearly visible ground level plinth. The Berghain dance floor level is located behind the parapets above the small horizontal windows above the plinth's cornice

Even if no information is known about the architects of the power plant, great design similarities to the other buildings in the monument ensemble can be seen. Thomas Karsten: "The ensemble was protected because the complex was part of the GDR's national reconstruction program. This design language can be found all along the former Stalinallee." A particular similarity exists between the north façade of the boiler house and the façade of the Deutsche Sporthalle arena. Its architect was Richard Paulick. An important planner for the architecture of Socialist Classicism was Hermann Henselmann. The design of the Friedrichshain heating plant is clearly based on the type of architecture for which Henselmann was known. Henselmann's influence affected several planners and institutions in East Berlin. Together with Hanns Hopp, Henselmann and Paulick are considered the key figures in GDR architecture in the 1950s: "The question of what a 'new German architecture' should look like, which was supposed to be 'national in form' and 'socialist in content', became a complicated challenge for architects, who were required to produce 'exemplary designs'. Without the architects Richard Paulick and Hanns Hopp, the construction of the early 1950s would not have been possible either. Like Henselmann, they had been involved in the construction of the ‘Stalinallee’ as head of a ‘master workshop’ at the German Building Academy [...]. On behalf of the academy, these three leading architects are said to have supervised almost all design work in the entire country." Even though these planners were not directly involved in the design of the Friedrichshain thermal power station, their architectural concept is closely linked to the design of the project described here.

== Image Gallery ==
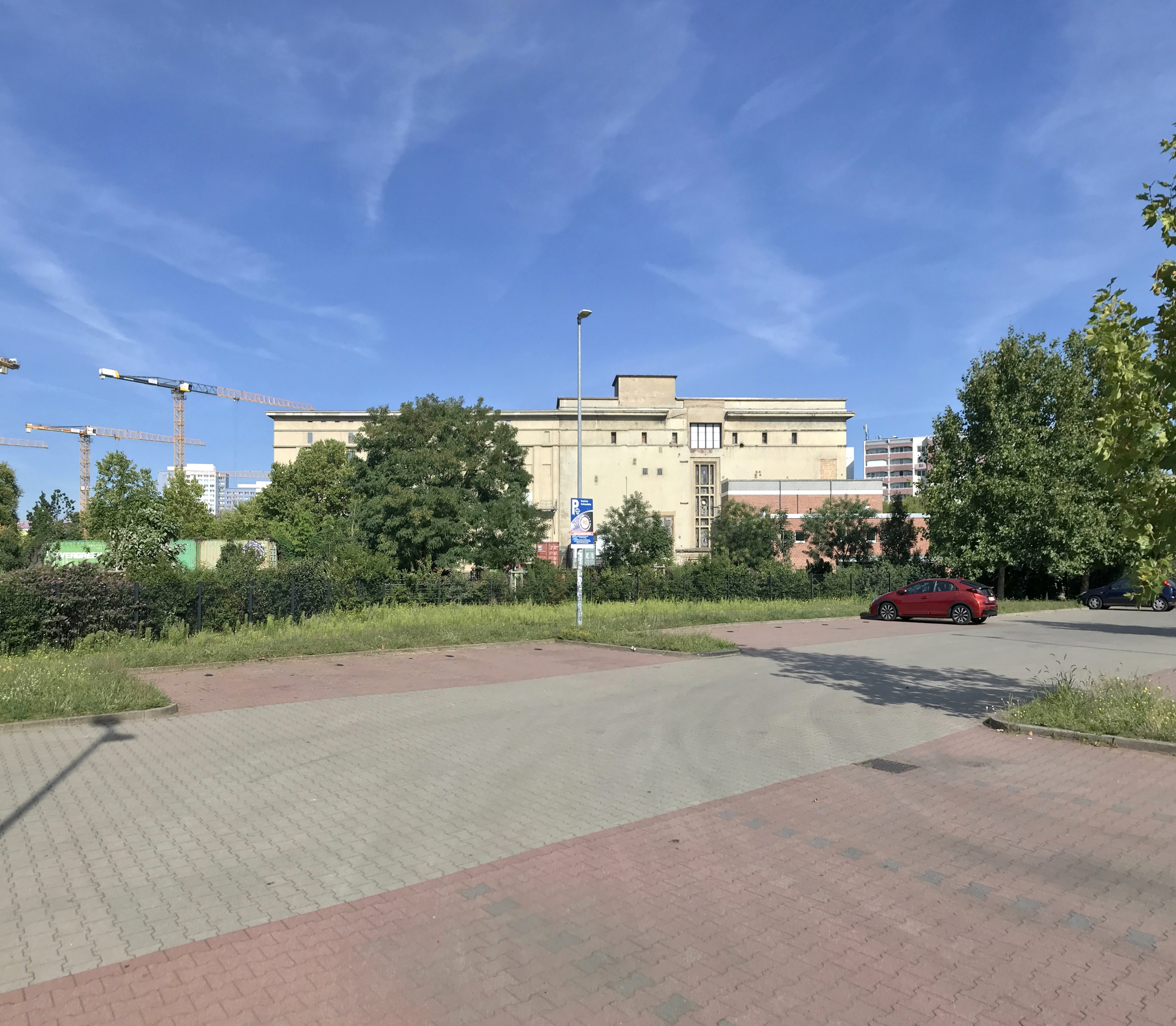
Both building sections viewed from east

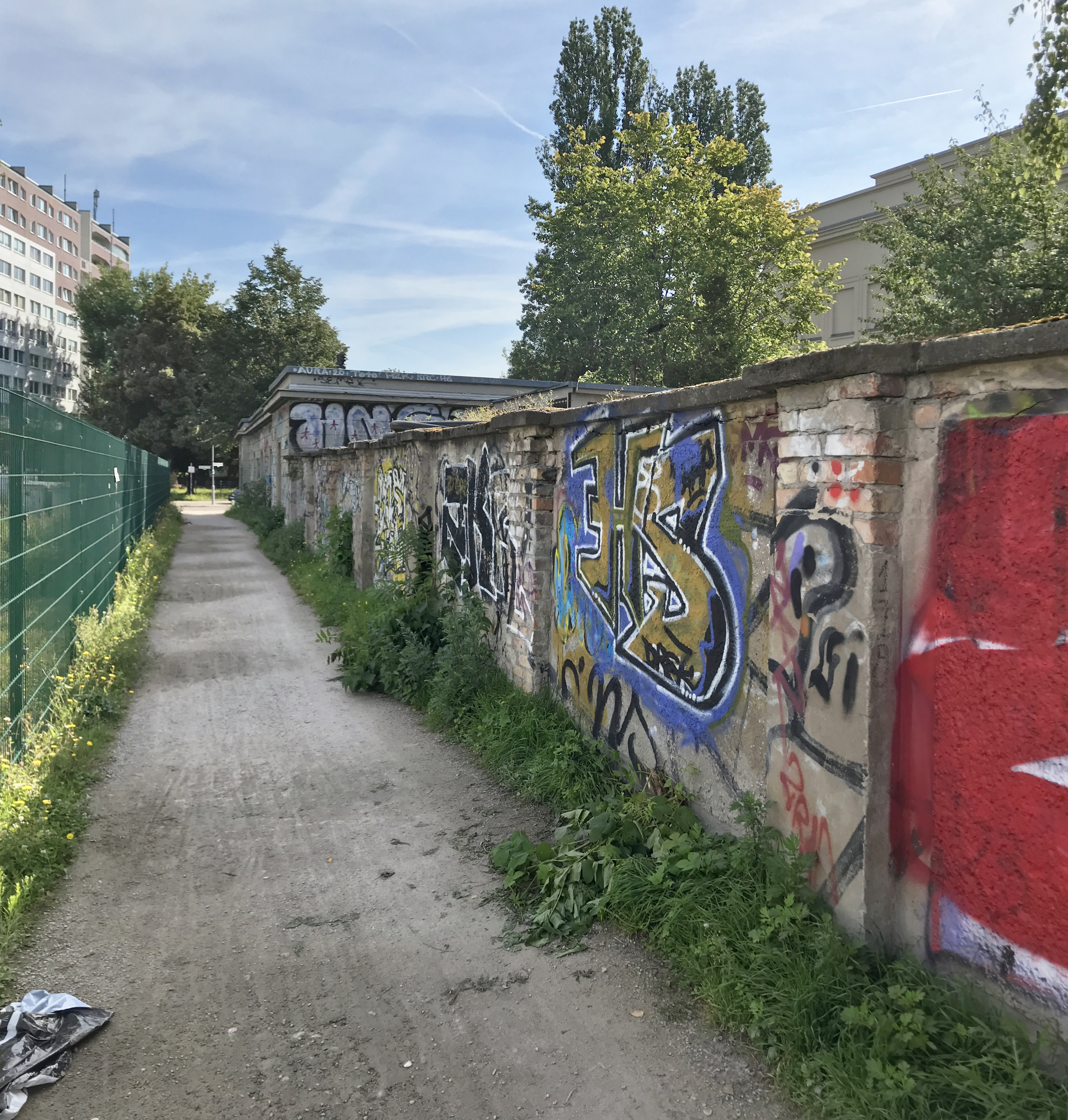
Western perimeter of the property, footpath to Rüdersdorfer Straße

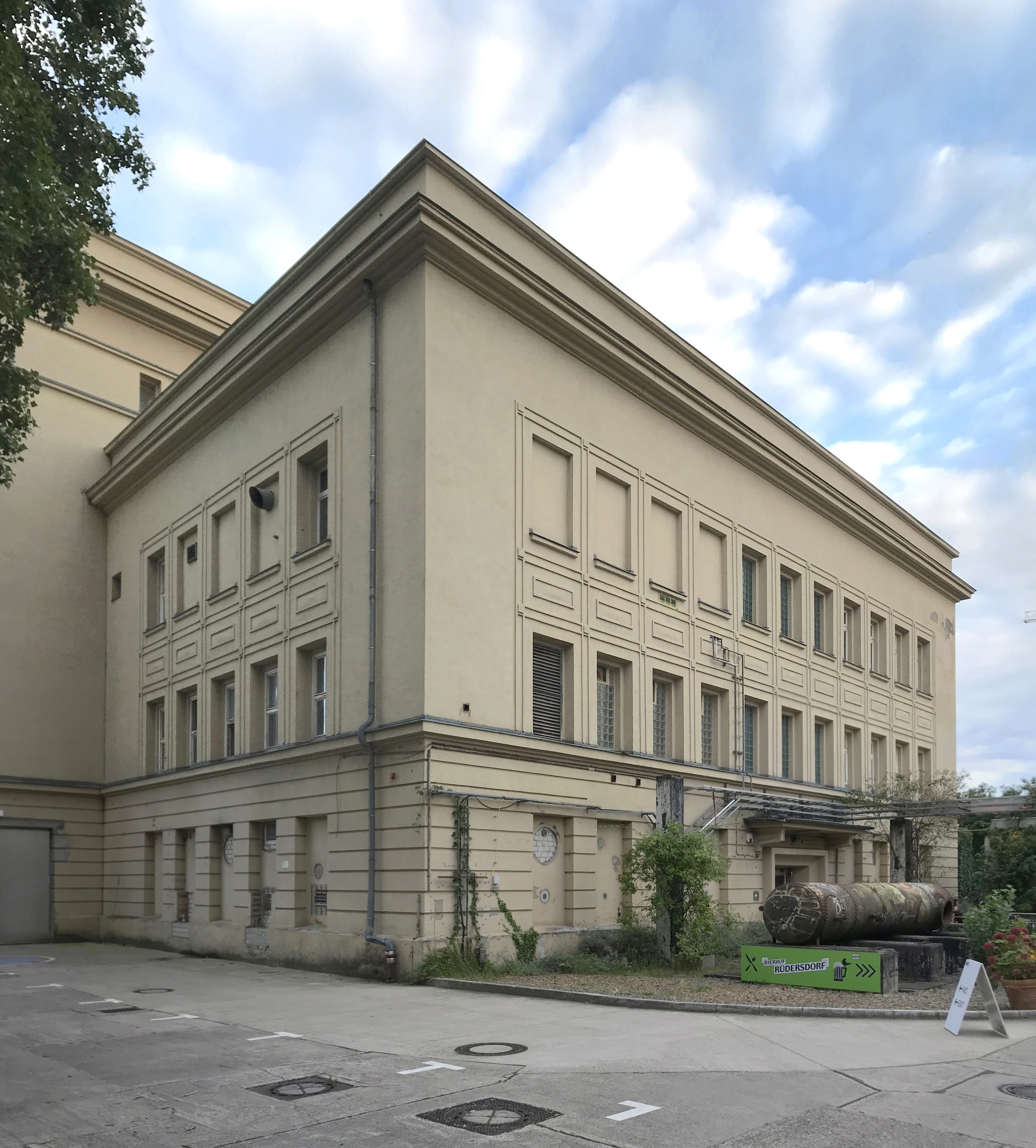
Boiler house annex, heating center

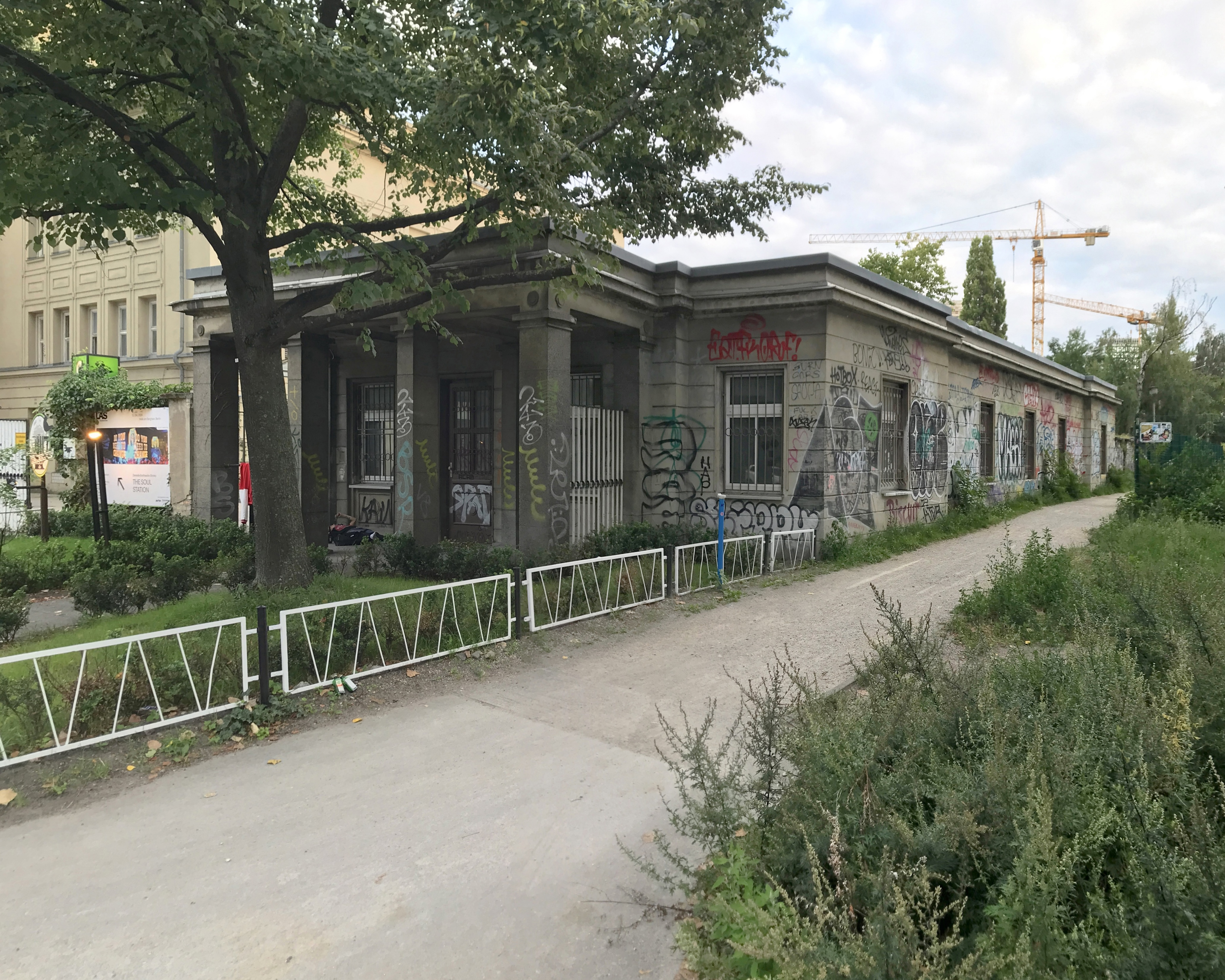
Low-rise building on property, north corner

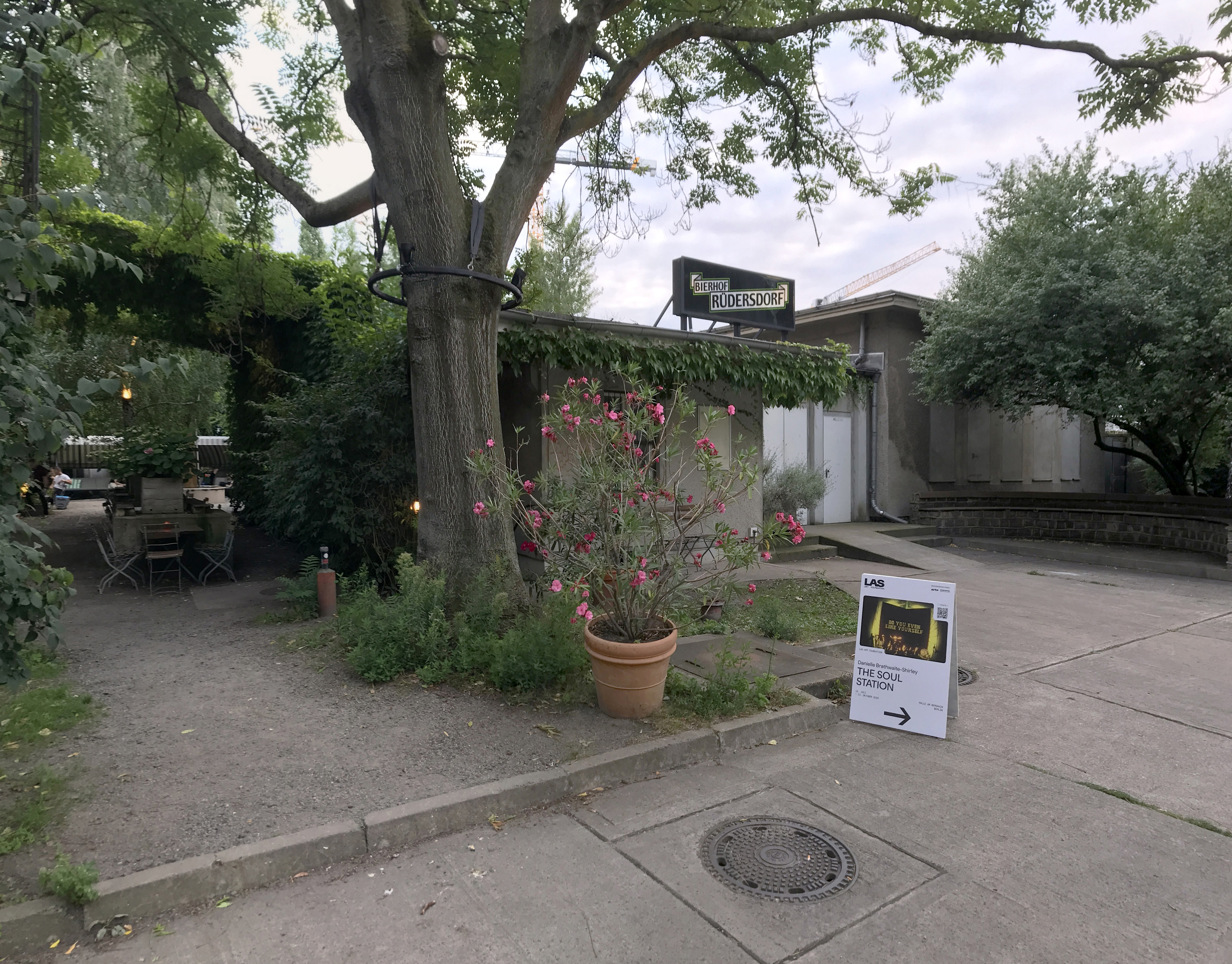
Low-rise building on property, canteen

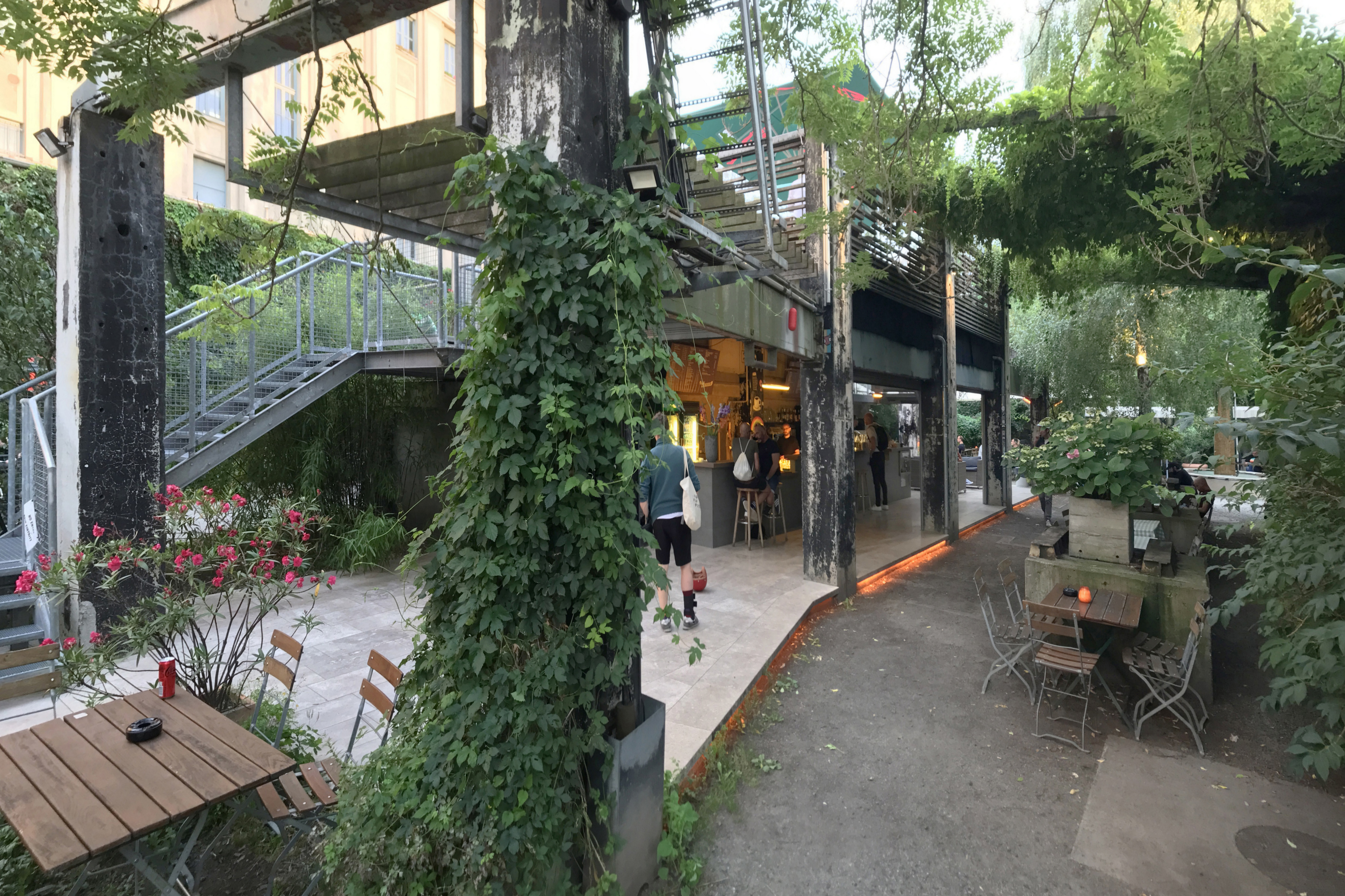
Low-rise building on property, beer garden

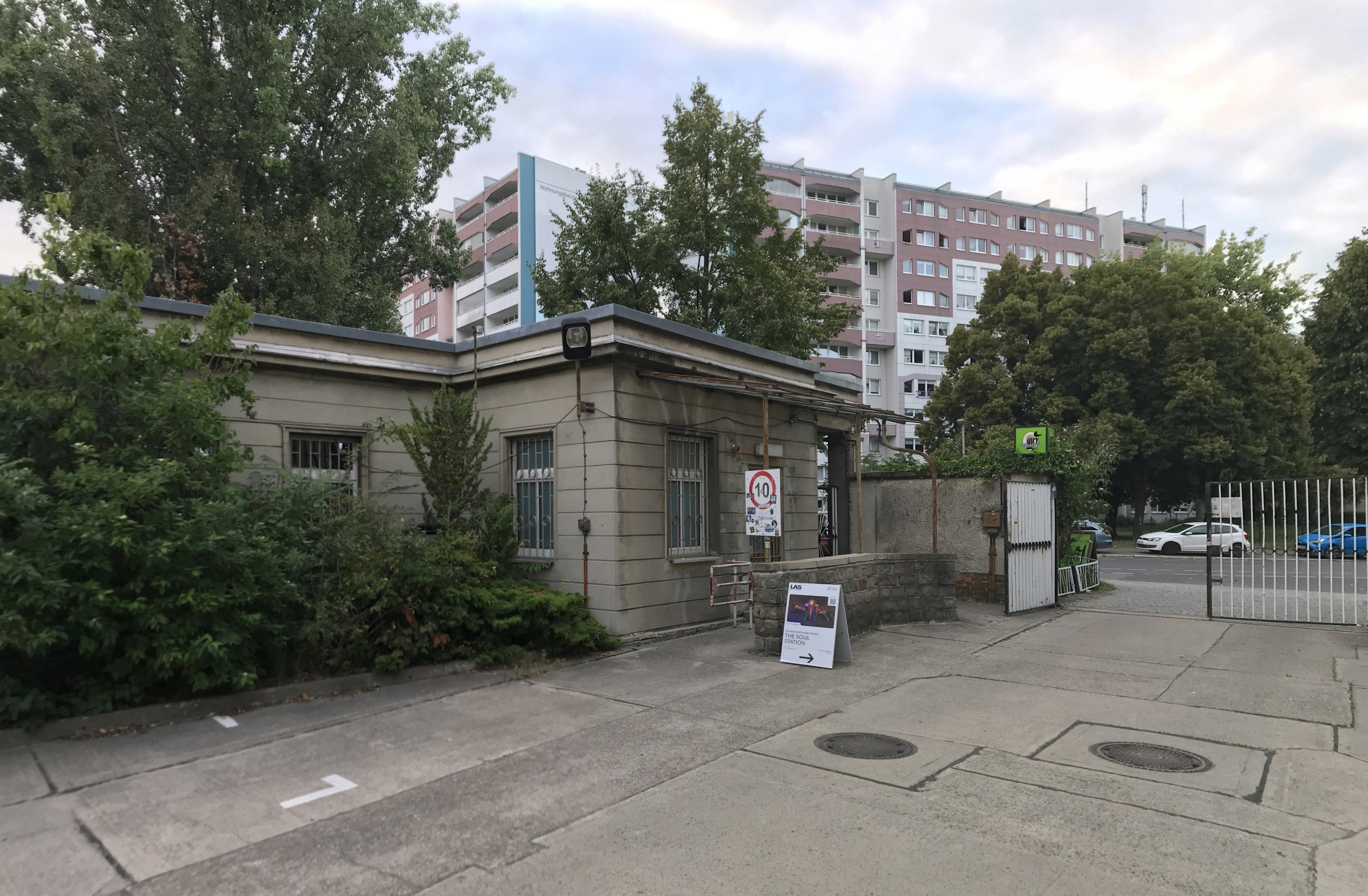
Low-rise building on property, north corner

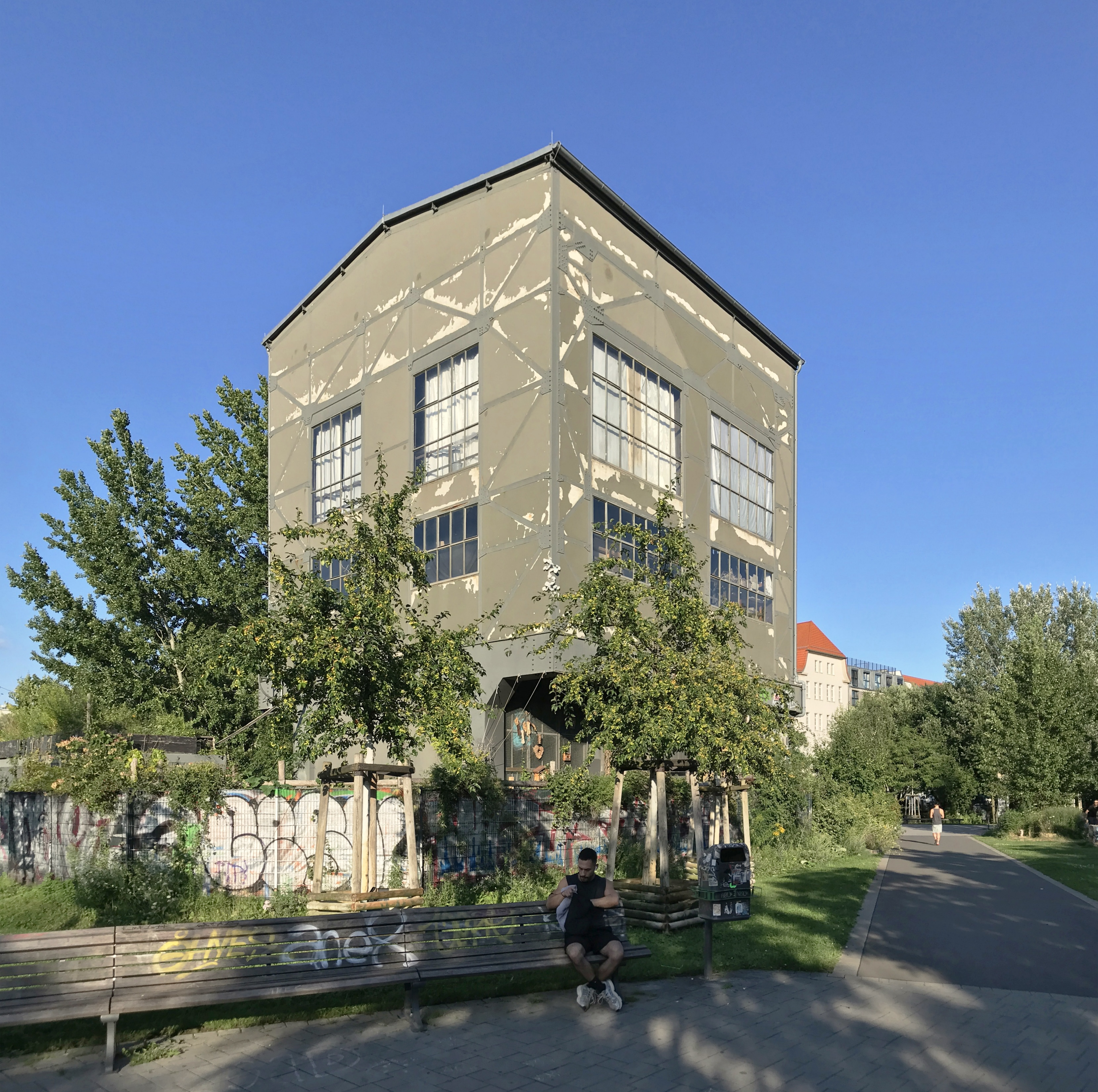
Locomotive shed, today neighbourhood organisation Nirgendwo
