= Micatone =

German nu jazz band

- Origin: Berlin, Germany
- Genres: Nu jazz
- Years active: 2001-present
- Labels: Sonar Kollektiv
- Website: Official website

Micatone is a German nu jazz band, consisting of the members Boris Meinhold on the guitar and synth, Tim Kroker on the drums, Sebastian "Hagen" Demmin on the keyboards (who previously worked as a live keyboard player with the electronic music band Daft Punk), Lisa Bassenge on the vocals, Rogall on the sequence programming, and Paul Kleber on the double bass.

== Discography ==
=== Studio albums ===
- Nine Songs (2001, Sonar Kollektiv)
- Is You Is (2003, Sonar Kollektiv)
- Nomad Songs (2005, Sonar Kollektiv)
- Wish I Was Here (2012, Sonar Kollektiv)
- The Crack (2017, Sonar Kollektiv)

=== EPs/Singles ===
- Micatone EP, 12" EP (2000)
- Remixes, 12" EP (2001)
- Step into the Gallery, 12" (2001)
- Plastic Bags & Magazines, 12" EP (2003)
- Yeah Yeah Yeah (That's the Way It Goes), Single (2005)
- Nomad Remixes, 12" (2005)
- Gun Dog, 12" (2012)
