= Bergnein =

Card game

Bergnein is a card game for 2–6 players in English, based on the door system and entry requirements for the Berghain nightclub in Berlin, and released in late 2017. The game was published under the Ninja Print imprint by Beware of Ninja AB, based in Gothenburg, Sweden. It was created by Alexander Kandiloros, with game mechanics by Alexander Kandiloros and André Forsblom, and designed by Joakim Bergkvist.

Bergnein achieved a degree of attention and notoriety both before and after its launch, thanks to a cancelled Kickstarter campaign which was covered extensively in the international press, and a series of threats and legal action on behalf of Berghain and its head doorman, Sven Marquardt. The game was printed and sold to people who pre-ordered it, but as a result of the legal action, it was subsequently withdrawn from sale and is no longer in print.

== Background ==
The game was originally conceived under the title “Berghain ze Game” and was inspired by Kandiloros’s and Bergkvist’s shared love for techno music. Its name was changed to Bergnein following the initial salvo of legal threats from Berghain nightclub. Ninja Print then funded production with income generated from pre-orders outside of Kickstarter, and began shipping the game in November 2017.

== Gameplay ==
Players assume the role of the doorman; a random selection of cards become the guests standing in line to get in, and your job is to ensure that the right ones are allowed entry to the club. You collect the cards representing the guests you let in, and score or lose points for each. The game reimplements mechanics from the card game Guillotine (1997).

== Controversy ==
The international press became aware of and began to cover the production of Berghain ze Game during its Kickstarter campaign, which aimed to raise 80,000 Swedish kronor. Shortly after this, lawyers representing Berghain nightclub requested that the campaign be stopped, on the grounds that the club’s name is copyrighted in Germany.

Ninja Print willingly changed the game’s name to Bergnein. This was followed by representatives of Berghain successfully having the game’s Kickstarter campaign cancelled anyway, losing Ninja Print the funding required for the game’s production. Ninja Print then switched to a pre-sales funding method – where copies of the game were pre-ordered to be shipped at a later date – at which point Berghain’s doorman, Sven Marquardt, then contacted Beware of Ninja through Swedish lawyers, alleging that he had been included in the game as a way to increase sales. Direct legal proceedings brought against Beware of Ninja in Germany, and a German court issued a cease and desist of any and all sales and/or marketing activities in Germany.

Kandiloros ultimately sought, and achieved, funding for production via pre-sales outside of Kickstarter, shipping games to end consumers in 40 countries.

Marquardt subsequently sued in the Swedish civil court, and ultimately won the case: Beware of Ninja AB was forced to pay around 500,000 Swedish kronor in costs and damages, as well as destroying all of the copies of the game in their possession.

== Reviews ==
- "The techno scenester's must-have card game" - Deep House Amsterdam
- "swap roles with the venue's infamously stern doormen" - Dazed
- "Equally surreal and fucked up" - Konbini
- "Puts the power in your hands" - EDM.com
- "Incredibly hilarious" - I heart Berlin

== Response and cultural impact ==
Bergnein’s story was covered extensively by the international press, both during the initial legal threats and action and following the court case. As a result, during the run-up to production, the game benefitted in terms of sales, reach and awareness from “the Streisand effect” generated by the international coverage and the newsworthiness of Berghain’s efforts to stop it from being made.

Examples of the Streisand effect in effect include the song entitled “Dörrpolitiken (Bergnein version)” (2019) by Swedish music producer Motormännen, which sampled Marquardt’s testimony from the Swedish Bergnein court case. and the cult status arguably achieved by the game, with used copies as of 2021 being sold for around 500 euro, 20 times the original price of 25 euro.
