= Sonar Kollektiv =

German record label

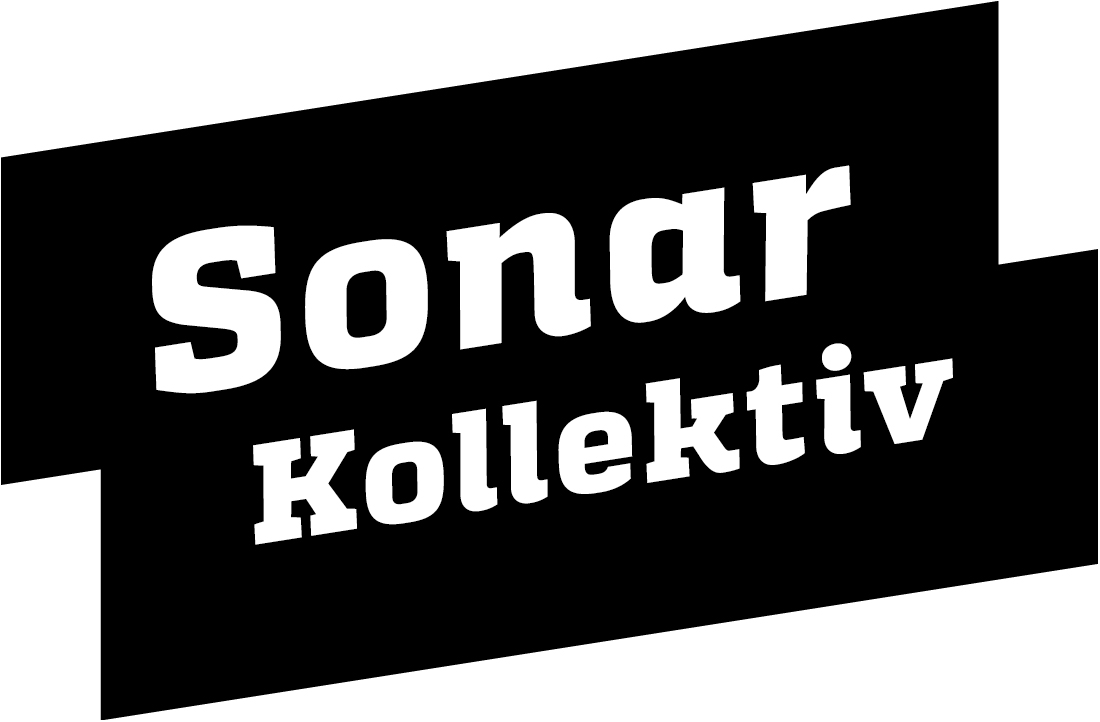
- Founded: 1997
- Founder: Jazzanova
- Genre: Downtempo
- Country of origin: Germany
- Location: Berlin
- Official website: sonarkollektiv.com

Sonar Kollektiv is a German record label founded in the late 1990s by the DJ and producer team Jazzanova(Claas Brieler, Roskow Kretschmann, Stefan Leisering, Axel Reinemer). The label specializes in downtempo music. The intention was to create an independent record label and publisher connected to a worldwide independent distribution network. They have more than 200 catalogue releases over the years. The label is promoted in the United States by Prommer, Inc.

== Artists ==
- Extended Spirit
- Forss
- Clara Hill
- Jazzanova
- Daniel Paul
- Micatone
- Sequel
- Benny Sings
- Lucifour M
- Âme
- Siriusmo
