= Âme =

German techno duo

- Origin: Germany
- Genres: House; techno
- Years active: 2001–present
- Labels: Innervisions; Ostgut Ton; Rush Hour; Sonar Kollektiv
- Members: Kristian Beyer; Frank Wiedemann

Âme is a German house/techno duo consisting of Kristian Beyer and Frank Wiedemann. The duo started making tracks in 2001. Beyer and Wiedemann first met in 2000 in Beyer's record shop in their hometown of Karlsruhe. As they both liked Chicago house and Detroit techno, they started to produce music together. Âme has released music for record labels such as Ostgut Ton and Sonar Kollektiv.

Together with Dixon, they own and manage the record label Innervisions in Berlin, Germany.

Âme were Mixmag magazine's "Duo of the Year" in 2006.

== Selected discography ==
=== Innervisions ===
- The Witness EP
- Dream House LP
- Tatischeff EP
- Âme Live EP
- Âme & Amampondo – Ku Kanjani EP
- Rrose Sélavy / Junggesellenmaschine
- A Critical Mass Live EP (with Henrik Schwarz, Dixon)
- Setsa / Ensor EP
- D.P.O.M.B. EP (with Henrik Schwarz, Dixon)
- Balandine EP
- Where We At EP (with Derrick Carter, Henrik Schwarz, Dixon)
- Rej EP

=== Ostgut Ton ===
- Fiori

=== Rush Hour ===
- Erkki

=== Sonar Kollektiv ===
- Kuma / Engoli
- ÂmeCD
- Mifune / Shiro
- Ojomo / Nia
- Sarari / Hydrolic Dog

=== Exclusive tracks ===
- Âme – "Life Changes"
- Âme – "Tonite"

=== Remixes (incomplete) ===
- Franz Ferdinand – "Feel the Love Go" (Âme Remix)
- Akabu – "Phuture Bound" (Âme Remix)
- Moderat – "Running" (Âme Remix)
- Howling – "Howling" (Âme Remix)
- Osunlade – "Envision" (Âme Remix)
- The xx – "Reunion" (Âme Remix)
- Sailor & I – "Turn Around" (Âme Remix)
- Wahoo – "Holding You" (Âme Remix)
- Jazzanova – "Glow and Glare" (Âme Remix)
